= List of political parties in Kenya =

This article lists political parties in Kenya.

== Political culture ==
Kenya's system has been a multi-party system since 1992. Since 2013, the National Assembly and Senate have been dominated by 2 coalitions of parties, in a manner similar to dominant parties in a two party system. Kenya had over 160 registered political parties as of November 2007.

Following the implementation of several Political Parties Acts starting with the 31 December 2008 act, the number of political parties, as at March 2025 now stands at 103 With the lapse of the registration period set out in the political parties act on 30 April 2012, twenty-four political parties had gained registration certificates while 22 others had applied for registration.

== The parties ==
=== Parliamentary parties ===
Coalition	Party	Abbr.	Leader	Ideology	Senate	Assembly
Kenya Kwanza	United Democratic Alliance	UDA	William Ruto	Conservatism; Economic liberalism	30 / 67	145 / 349
Kenya Kwanza	Amani National Congress	ANC	Musalia Mudavadi	Social liberalism	2 / 67	7 / 349
Kenya Kwanza	Forum for the Restoration of Democracy – Kenya	FORD–K	Moses Wetangula	Social democracy	1 / 67	6 / 349
Kenya Kwanza	United Democratic Movement	UDM	Ali Roba		1 / 67	7 / 349
Kenya Kwanza	Maendeleo Chap Chap Party	MCC	Alfred Mutua		0 / 67	2 / 349
Kenya Kwanza	Democratic Party	DP	Joseph K. Munyao	Conservatism	0 / 67	1 / 349
Kenya Kwanza	Total (Kenya Kwanza)				34 / 67	179 / 349
Azimio la Umoja	Orange Democratic Movement	ODM	Raila Odinga	Social democracy; Civic nationalism; Social liberalism	20 / 67	87 / 349
Azimio la Umoja	Jubilee Party	JP	Uhuru Kenyatta	National conservatism; Economic liberalism	5 / 67	29 / 349
Azimio la Umoja	Wiper Patriotic Front	WDM–K	Kalonzo Musyoka	Social democracy	4 / 67	26 / 349
Azimio la Umoja	Kenya African National Union	KANU	Gideon Moi	Kenyan nationalism; Conservatism	2 / 67	5 / 349
Azimio la Umoja	Democratic Action Party	DAP-K	Eugene Wamalwa		0 / 67	5 / 349
Azimio la Umoja	Kenya Union Party	KUP			0 / 67	3 / 349
Azimio la Umoja	Total (Azimio la Umoja)				31 / 67	158 / 349
Other parties & independents	Pamoja African Alliance	PAA	Amason Kingi		0 / 67	3 / 349
Other parties & independents	Chama Cha Mashinani	CCM	Isaac Ruto		0 / 67	2 / 349
Other parties & independents	The Service Party	TSP	Mwangi Kiunjuri		0 / 67	2 / 349
Other parties & independents	Kenya National Congress	KNC	Manson Nyamweya		0 / 67	2 / 349
Other parties & independents	United Party of Independent Alliance	UPIA			0 / 67	2 / 349
Other parties & independents	Economic Freedom Party	EFP	Billow Kerrow		0 / 67	1 / 349
Other parties & independents	Peoples Democratic Party	PDP			0 / 67	1 / 349
Other parties & independents	Frontier Alliance Party	FAP			0 / 67	1 / 349
Other parties & independents	National Agenda Party	NAP			0 / 67	1 / 349
Other parties & independents	Kenya People's Party	KPP			0 / 67	1 / 349
Other parties & independents	New Democrats	ND			0 / 67	1 / 349
Other parties & independents	Other minor parties	—	—		0 / 67	2 / 349
Other parties & independents	Independents				2 / 67	12 / 349

=== Composition following the 2022 general election ===
Coalition	Party	Abbr.	Leader	Ideology	Senate	Assembly
Jubilee	Jubilee Party; Chama cha Jubilee (Swahili)	JP	Uhuru Kenyatta	Kenyan nationalism National conservatism Economic liberalism	5 / 67	172 / 349
Jubilee	Kenya African National Union	KANU	Gideon Moi	Kenyan nationalism Conservatism	0 / 67	10 / 349
Jubilee	United Democratic Alliance	UDA	William Ruto	Conservatism	32 / 67	1 / 349
Jubilee	Total				37 / 67	186 / 349
NASA	Orange Democratic Movement	ODM	Raila Odinga	Social democracy Civic nationalism Social liberalism	20 / 67	76 / 349
NASA	Wiper Democratic Movement – Kenya	WDM-K	Kalonzo Musyoka	Social democracy	4 / 67	25 / 349
NASA	Amani National Congress	ANC	Musalia Mudavadi	Social liberalism	0 / 67	14 / 349
NASA	Forum for the Restoration of Democracy – Kenya	FORD-K	Moses Wetangula	Social democracy	0 / 67	12 / 349
NASA	The Patriotic Party; Chama cha Uzalendo (Swahili)	CCU	Maur Bwanamaka	Liberal democracy	0 / 67	1 / 349
NASA	Muungano Party	MP	Fabian Muli		0 / 67	1 / 349
NASA	Total				24 / 67	125 / 349
None	Economic Freedom Party	EFP	Billow Kerrow		0 / 67	5 / 349
None	Maendeleo Chap Chap Party	MCC	Alfred Mutua		0 / 67	4 / 349
None	Local Party; Chama Cha Mashinani (Swahili)	CCM	Isaac Ruto		0 / 67	2 / 349
None	Kenya National Congress	KNC	Manson Nyamweya	Human rights Social justice Democracy	0 / 67	2 / 349
None	Kenya People's Party	KPP			0 / 67	2 / 349
None	Peoples Democratic Party	PDP			0 / 67	2 / 349
None	New Democrats	ND			0 / 67	1 / 349
None	Party of National Unity; Chama cha Umoja wa Kitaifa (Swahili)	PNU	Mwai Kibaki	Conservatism; Liberal democracy	0 / 67	1 / 349
None	Democratic Party; Chama cha Demokrasia (Swahili)	DP	Joseph K. Munyao	Conservatism	1 / 67	1 / 349
None	Frontier Alliance Party	FAP			0 / 67	1 / 349
None	National Agenda Party	NAP			0 / 67	1 / 349

=== Composition following the 2017 general election (2017–2022) ===
Coalition	Party	Abbr.	Leader	Ideology	Senate	Assembly
Jubilee Party	Jubilee Party	JP	Uhuru Kenyatta	National conservatism Economic liberalism Kenyan nationalism	34 / 67	173 / 349
Jubilee Party	Total (Jubilee)				34 / 67	173 / 349
NASA	Orange Democratic Movement	ODM	Raila Odinga	Social democracy Civic nationalism Social liberalism	20 / 67	76 / 349
NASA	Wiper Democratic Movement – Kenya	WDM–K	Kalonzo Musyoka	Social democracy	4 / 67	23 / 349
NASA	Amani National Congress	ANC	Musalia Mudavadi	Social liberalism	3 / 67	14 / 349
NASA	Forum for the Restoration of Democracy – Kenya	FORD–K	Moses Wetangula	Social democracy	2 / 67	12 / 349
NASA	Total (NASA)				29 / 67	125 / 349
Other parties & Independents	Kenya African National Union	KANU	Gideon Moi	Conservatism; Kenyan nationalism	3 / 67	10 / 349
Other parties & Independents	Economic Freedom Party	EFP	Billow Kerrow		0 / 67	5 / 349
Other parties & Independents	Maendeleo Chap Chap Party	MCC	Alfred Mutua		0 / 67	4 / 349
Other parties & Independents	Chama Cha Mashinani	CCM	Isaac Ruto		0 / 67	2 / 349
Other parties & Independents	Chama Cha Uzalendo	CCU			0 / 67	1 / 349
Other parties & Independents	Kenya National Congress	KNC			0 / 67	2 / 349
Other parties & Independents	Other minor parties	—	—		0 / 67	3 / 349
Other parties & Independents	Independents				1 / 67	14 / 349

=== Composition following the 2013 general election (2013–2017) ===
Coalition	Party	Abbr.	Leader	Ideology	Senate	Assembly
Jubilee Alliance	The National Alliance	TNA	Uhuru Kenyatta	Kenyan nationalism Conservatism; Economic liberalism	17 / 67	89 / 349
Jubilee Alliance	United Republican Party (Kenya)	URP	William Ruto	Conservatism; National conservatism	12 / 67	75 / 349
Jubilee Alliance	Total (Jubilee Alliance)				30 / 67	167 / 349
CORD	Orange Democratic Movement	ODM	Raila Odinga	Social democracy Civic nationalism Social liberalism	17 / 67	96 / 349
CORD	Wiper Democratic Movement – Kenya	WDM–K	Kalonzo Musyoka	Social democracy	5 / 67	26 / 349
CORD	Forum for the Restoration of Democracy – Kenya	FORD–K	Moses Wetangula	Social democracy	4 / 67	10 / 349
CORD	Total (CORD)				28 / 67	141 / 349
Amani Coalition	United Democratic Forum	UDF	Musalia Mudavadi	Social liberalism	3 / 67	12 / 349
Amani Coalition	Kenya African National Union	KANU	Gideon Moi	Kenyan nationalism Conservatism	3 / 67	6 / 349
Amani Coalition	New Ford Kenya	NFK			1 / 67	6 / 349
Total (Amani Coalition)			6 / 67	24 / 349		
Other parties & Independents	Alliance Party of Kenya	APK			3 / 67	5 / 349
Other parties & Independents	Forum for the Restoration of Democracy – People	FORD–P			0 / 67	4 / 349
Other parties & Independents	Federal Party of Kenya	FPK			1 / 67	3 / 349
Other parties & Independents	Kenya National Congress	KNC			0 / 67	2 / 349
Other parties & Independents	Chama Cha Uzalendo	CCU			0 / 67	2 / 349
Other parties & Independents	Independents & minor parties	—	—		0 / 67	4 / 349
Other parties & Independents	Unaffiliated / Others				3 / 67	17 / 349

=== Other parties ===
Name	Ideology	Created	Notes/ Sources
Agano Party	N/A	2006	N/A
Alliance for Real Change	N/A	2010	N/A
Communist Party of Kenya	Communism; Marxism-Leninism	1992	Formerly known as the Social Democratic Party.
Communist Party Marxist – Kenya	Communism; Marxism-Leninism	2024	Split from the Communist Party of Kenya
Conservative Party	Conservatism	N/A	N/A
Democratic Action Party	N/A	N/A	Part of Azimio La Umoja
Democracy for the Citizens Party	Social democracy	February 2025	Formed by former Deputy President Gachagua after his impeachment.
Federal Party of Kenya	Federalism	2007?	N/A
Kenya African Democratic Union – Asili	N/A	2006	N/A
Kenya Social Congress	N/A	1992	N/A
Maendeleo Democratic Party	N/A	2007	N/A
Mazingira Green Party of Kenya	Green politics	1997	Formerly known as the Liberal Party of Kenya.
People's Liberation Party	N/A	2005	Created after the 2005 Kenyan constitutional referendum, known as the National Rainbow Coalition–Kenya (Narc-Kenya) until 2025.
National Labour Party	N/A	2004?	N/A
National Party of Kenya	N/A	2002?	N/A
National Rainbow Coalition	Social democracy	2002	N/A
National Vision Party	N/A	2008	N/A
National Economic Development Party (NEDP)		December 2025	Created by former Nairobi Governor Mike Sonko.
Party of Development and Reforms	N/A	2012	N/A
Party of Independent Candidates of Kenya	N/A	1992	N/A
Peoples Party of Kenya	N/A	1996	N/A
Restore and Build Kenya	N/A	2012	N/A
Safina	Liberalism	1995	N/A
Shirikisho Party of Kenya	N/A	1997	N/A
Sisi Kwa Sisi	N/A	2002?	N/A
United Democratic Movement	N/A	1999	N/A
Unity Party of Kenya	N/A	2011	N/A
Kenya National Democratic Alliance	N/A	1992	N/A
Madaraka People's Movement	Socialism; Progressivism	2005	Identifies as a youth-focused party.
Forum for the Restoration of Democracy – Asili	N/A	1991	N/A
Independent Economic Party	N/A	N/A	N/A
Kenya African Democratic Development Union	N/A	2006	N/A
National Alliance of Kenya	N/A	N/A	N/A
United Democratic Alliance	N/A	2020	N/A
Eagle Alliance	N/A	2013	Minor opposition coalition.
Kenya Union Party	N/A	N/A	Part of Azimio La Umoja
Pamoja African Alliance	N/A	N/A	Part of Azimio La Umoja
United Party of Independent Alliance	N/A	N/A	Part of Azimio La Umoja

=== Former parties ===
Name	Ideology	Created	Dissolved	Notes
Alliance Party of Kenya	N/A	2012	2016	Created in support of Uhuru Kenyatta.
Forum for the Restoration of Democracy – People	Social democracy	1997	2016	Merged with the Jubilee Party.
Grand National Union of Kenya	N/A	2012	2016	Merged with the Jubilee Party.
New Forum for the Restoration of Democracy–Kenya	Third way Social democracy	2006	2016	Merged with the Jubilee Party.
The Independent Party	N/A	2007?	2016	N/A
United Democratic Forum Party	Liberalism; Economic liberalism Humanism	2012	2016	Merged with the Jubilee Party.
United Republican Party	Liberalism	2012	2016	Merged with the Jubilee Party.
Kenya African Democratic Union	Majimboism	1960	1964	Merged with the Kenya African National Union.
Kenya People's Union	Socialism	1966	1969	Were banned after 3 years of existence.
Liberal Democratic Party	Liberalism	2002	2005	N/A
Kenya Independence Movement	Kenyan nationalism	1959	1959	Early pro-independence party.
Nairobi People's Convention Party	African nationalism	1957	1961	Early pro-independence party.
African People's Party	N/A	1962	1963	N/A
Amani Coalition	Centrism	2013	2013?	Former coalition.
Baluhya Political Union	N/A	1960	1965	N/A
Capricorn Africa Society	N/A	1949	1961	N/A
Independent Group	Right-wing politics	1956?	1959	European minority party.
Kenya Coalition	N/A	1960	1963	N/A
Kenya Freedom Party	N/A	1960	1962	Indian minority party.
Kenya Indian Congress	N/A	1914	1962	Indian minority party.
New Kenya Party	N/A	1959	1963	N/A
Nyanza Province African Union	N/A	1963?	N/A	N/A
Reform Party	N/A	1921	N/A	N/A
Shungwaya Freedom Party	N/A	1961?	1967	N/A
The National Alliance	Kenyan nationalism Conservatism	2000	2016	N/A
Jubilee Alliance	Centre-right politics	2013	2016	Former ruling coalition.
Forum for the Restoration of Democracy	Democracy	1991	1992	Split into 3 parties ahead of its first election.
Kenya National Party	N/A	1959	1960	N/A
National Development Party	N/A	1991	2002	N/A
United Country Party	N/A	1954	1957	N/A
United Party	N/A	1959	1960	N/A
Young Kikuyu Association	N/A	1921	N/A	N/A
Coalition for Reforms and Democracy	Social democracy	2012	2017	Former opposition coalition.

== See also ==
- Politics of Kenya
- List of political parties by country
