= 2013 Kenyan general election =

- 4 March 2013
- Presidential election
- Turnout: 85.91%
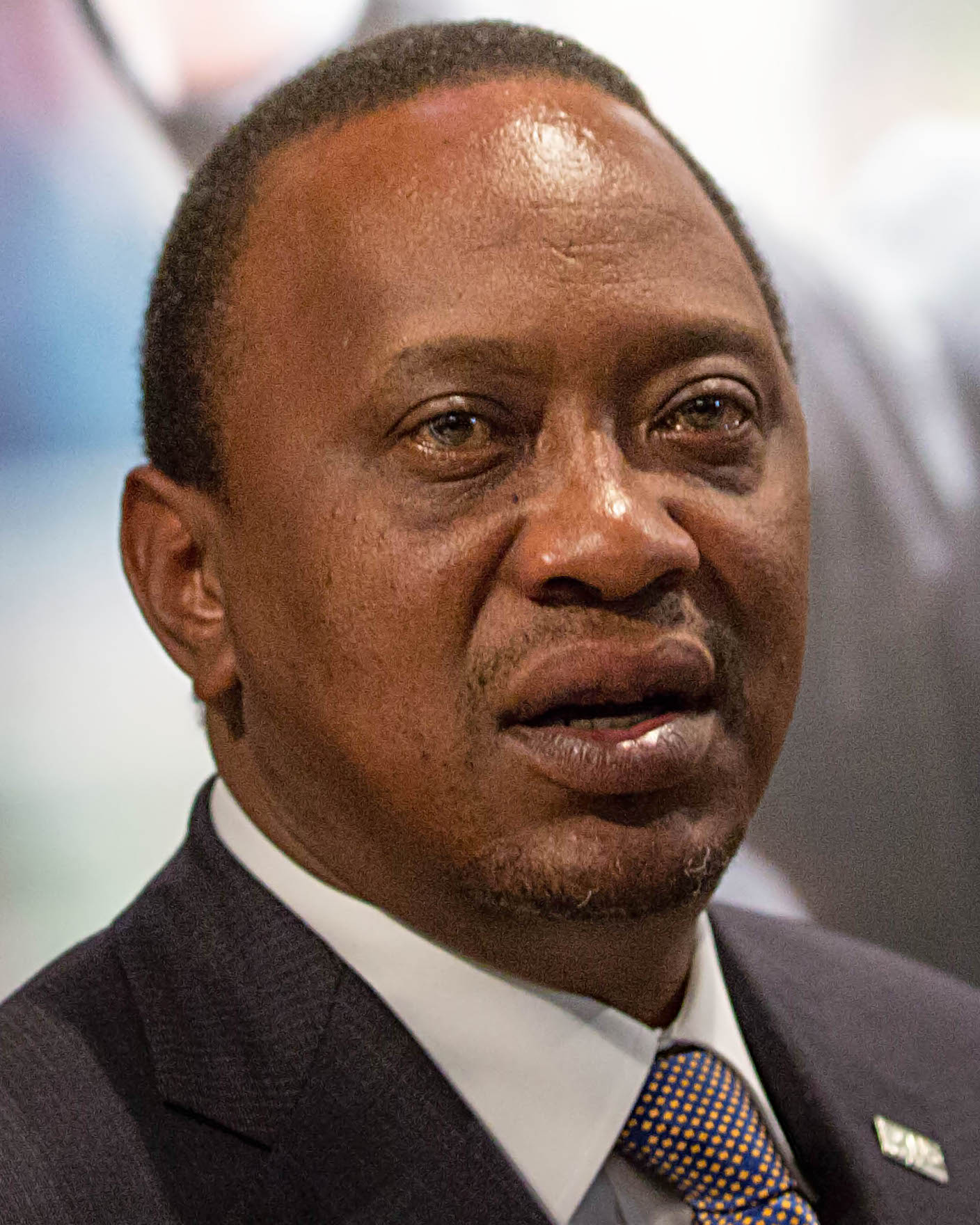

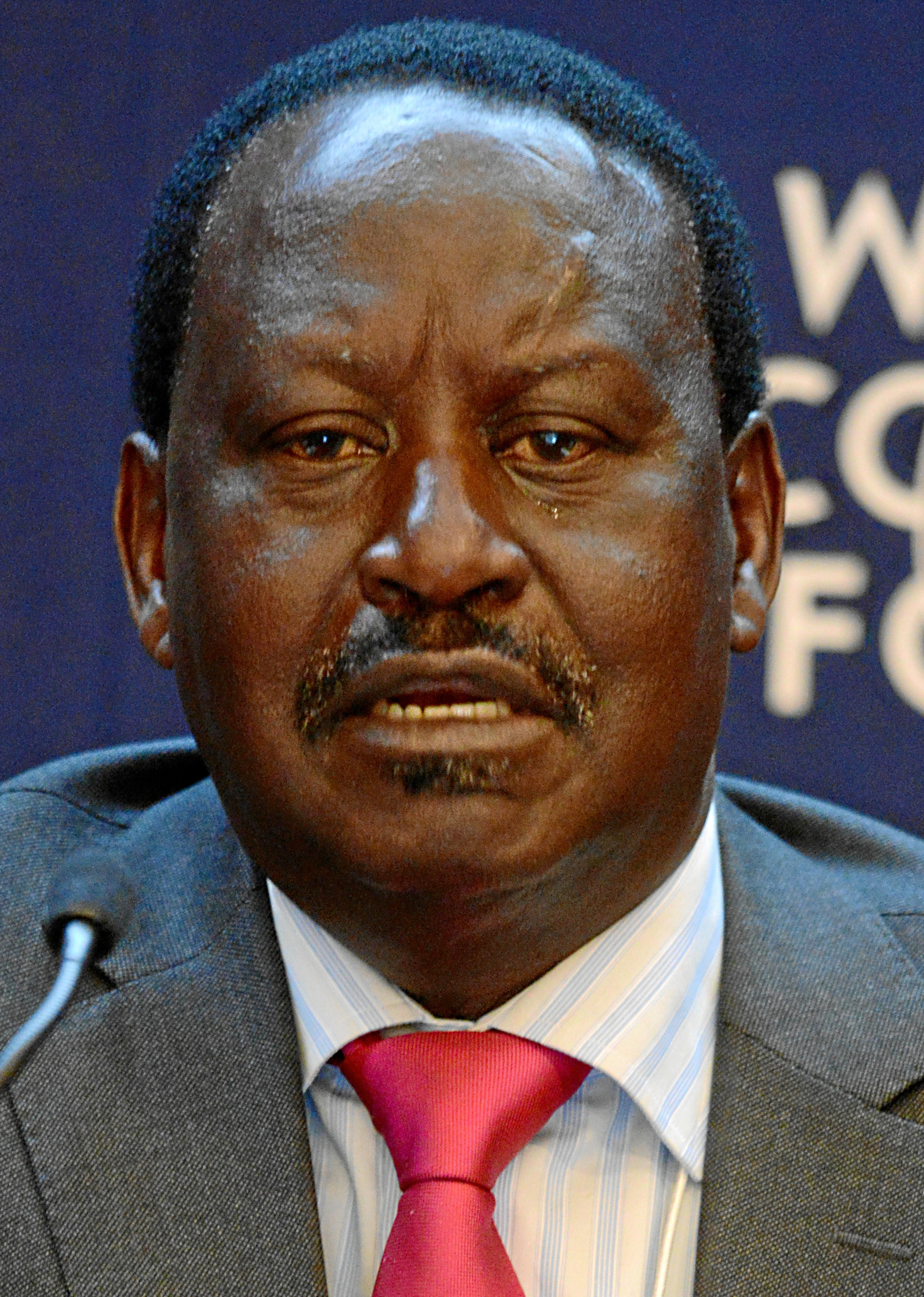
Nominee	Uhuru Kenyatta	Raila Odinga
Party	National Alliance	ODM
Alliance	Jubilee	CORD
Running mate	William Ruto	Kalonzo Musyoka
Popular vote	6,173,433	5,340,546
Percentage	50.51%	43.7%
Counties won	20	26 + Diaspora
Counties with 25% vote	33	30
- Results by province
President before election
Mwai Kibaki
PNU
Elected President
Uhuru Kenyatta
National Alliance

General elections were held in Kenya on 4 March 2013. Voters elected the President, members of the National Assembly and newly formed Senate. Also elected include governors, county women representatives and members of county assembly, (MCAs). They were the first elections held under the new constitution, which was approved in a 2010 referendum, and were also the first run by the new Independent Electoral and Boundaries Commission (IEBC). They coincided with the 2013 Kenyan local elections.

The presidential election saw Uhuru Kenyatta of the National Alliance (TNA) defeat Raila Odinga of the Orange Democratic Movement (ODM). Incumbent President Mwai Kibaki was ineligible to pursue a third term due to the two-term limit established in Clause 142 of the Constitution of Kenya. This was the first Kenyan presidential election to include a joint-ticket system for deputy president, which was introduced in the 2010 Constitution. Kenyatta was joined on his ticket by William Ruto, while Odinga's running mate was Kalonzo Musyoka. Kenyatta was backed by the Jubilee Alliance, while Odinga was supported by the Coalition for Reforms and Democracy (CORD). Kenyatta was declared the winner with 50.5% of the vote, meaning a second round of voting was not needed. Odinga unsuccessfully contested the results in the Supreme Court.

== Background ==
=== Election date ===
The elections were originally scheduled for 14 August 2012 or December 2012 were planned for the election, depending on a court ruling to be issued. The court ruled that presidential and parliamentary elections should be held in March 2013. This resulted in the resignation of several civil servants who wished to enter politics, as required by the Elections Act. On 28 December 2012, the Independent Electoral and Boundaries Commission announced the Notice of General Elections which confirmed polling day as 4 March. The nomination deadlines were set over a period between 29 January and 1 February, with presidential candidates submitting their nomination papers on 29 and 30 January.

=== Supreme Court ===
On 13 January, the Judiciary indicated it would hear and determine within two weeks disputes on presidential election results. The Judiciary Working Committee on Election Preparations (JWCEP) announced that election petitions would be certified urgent. These rules were developed in pursuance of Article 163(8) of the constitution which mandates the Supreme Court to make rules for the exercise of its exclusive jurisdiction of hearing presidential election petition.

=== Voter registration ===
Voter registration ran from 19 November 2012 for 30 days. Problems were reported during the first few days of the registration exercise included availability of electricity, military operations in some areas and logistical challenges caused by rains. Another subsequent challenge was the inability to register prospective voters who were still awaiting issuance of their formal identity documents by the government. On 27 November, the government announced that, due to time and logistics constraints, there would be no attempts to register Kenyan voters in the diaspora. The IEBC later announced a decision to register Kenyan diaspora voters living within the East African Community Countries. The ten-day exercise concluded on 25 December 2012 with low turnout attributed to "logistical challenges". The IEBC estimate was that about 1,700 people registered.

Voter registration was carried out using Biometric Voter Registration (BVR) Kits which would reduce certain incidents of fraud. The purchase of the BVR Kits was financed through a loan from Standard Chartered Kenya in a government-to-government deal involving Kenya and Canada made cheaper by a guarantee from the Canadian government. The Canadian government arranged to have its fully owned parastatal, Canadian Commercial Corporation (CCC), sign a contract with the Independent Electoral and Boundaries Commission (IEBC).

A case was filed in court seeking to extend the voter registration period arguing that Section 5(1) of the Elections Act was in conflict with the Constitution to the extent that it limited continuous registration of voters. The courts however declined request to extend the deadline.

After the 18 December deadline, the IEBC released the provisional voter numbers showing a registered base of 14.3 million voters. The IEBC indicated that they had missed their target of 18 million voters, citing voter apathy as one of reasons for this. The IEBC begun an exercise to clean up the voters' roll with a target of opening it for verification early January 2013. On 13 January 2013 the IEBC opened its voter register for inspection; voters were to verify their details before 26 January to enable the commission clean the register ahead of the poll. The options include visiting respective registration centers, the IEBC website or the use of mobile phone numbers via an SMS service (using National Identity Card or Passport numbers used during registration).

The IEBC announced on 23 February 2013 that it had removed 20,000 voters who had registered more than once from the voter roll. The names were identified during continuing activities to clean up the register.

== Electoral system ==
The 2010 constitution provided for a two-round system for presidential elections, the president having previously been elected on a first-past-the-post basis. In order to win in the first round, a candidate was required to receive over 50% of the vote, as well as 25% of the vote in at least 24 counties.

== Campaign ==
=== Coalitions and alliances ===
The law required all Kenyan political parties to register any coalition agreements with the Registrar of Political Parties by 4 December 2012. This resulted in several publicised discussions among key political players and their respective parties who aimed to form pre-election coalitions prior to the deadline. Another effect considered likely was a reduction in the number of prospective candidates. Four coalitions formed by the deadline include:

- The Coalition for Reforms and Democracy: ODM, Wiper Party, Ford-Kenya and the Federal Party of Kenya.
- The Jubilee Alliance: TNA, URP and UDF Parties. UDF later left the coalition. Machel Waikenda was the director of communications and secretary of arts and entertainment of the National Alliance, from April 2012 to August 2013 and he led the media and communications department of the party during the 2013 elections.
- Eagle Alliance: KNC and POA Parties
- Pambazuka Coalition: New FORD Kenya, National Vision Party, Federal Party of Kenya and KADDU Parties. The coalition collapsed on 29 December 2012.
- Amani Coalition: UDF, New Ford Kenya and KANU Parties (formed after the UDF exit from the Jubilee Coalition.

The release of the calendar resulted in several parties opting to hold their nominations on 17 January 2013. The IEBC proposed public school shut down on 17 January 2013, as the schools would be the venue for a significant number of nomination activities across the country. The Government confirmed that public schools would not open on 17 January 2013. The government later announced that Public primary schools would for the second day (18 January 2013) remain closed to allow party primaries to continue. On 19 January the IEBC indicated that political aspirants who lost during respective party primaries are not allowed to defect and seek tickets on other parties after Midnight on 18 January 2013. By law, political parties were expected to nominate their candidates for an election at least 45 days before.

While other parties and coalitions held their nominations early, the Jubilee, Amani and CORD coalitions chose to hold country wide their nominations two days before the deadline. These were marked with disorganization and chaos with protests arising in Nairobi, Nyanza and Central provinces.

Further acrimony arose over issuance of certificates by political parties, with over 200 complaints filed with the IEBC disputes and Resolution panel The committee consisted of 4 IEBC Commissioners and one official from the Director of Public Prosecutions office. The committee held its sittings at the Milimani Law Courts in Nairobi. Complaints raised included issuing of certificates not losers, nepotism and discrimination. The committee had seven days to complete the arbitration process with those dissatisfied with the tribunal's decision asked to lodge their cases with the High Court. The panel eventually announced 3 days of hearings. The Panel completed its work on 28 January 2013 dismissing 64 out of 207 petitions following failure by complainants to attend. 29 applications did not need determination as Political parties conceded to the complaints.

=== Presidential candidates ===
Minister of Internal Security George Saitoti, second hand man to both Daniel Arap Moi and incumbent President Mwai Kibaki, was expected to be a candidate but died in June 2012 in a helicopter crash. His mixed Masai and Kikuyu heritage was seen as important in light of the violence that followed the 2007 presidential election and the tendency in Kenyan politics for ethnic-based alliances.

Several politicians made public their intentions to run or were speculated to run by media analysts and polling organizations:

- Sylvester Wakoli Bifwoli – MP for Bumula Constituency.
- Mohammed Abduba Dida – Former High School Teacher
- Joseph Hellon – Jazz Maestro, Chair of the Placenta Party.
- Cyrus Jirongo – MP for Lugari Constituency.
- Kingwa Kamencu – Oxford Rhodes Scholar
- Martha Karua – MP for Gichugu Constituency.
- Peter Kenneth – MP for Gatanga Constituency.
- Uhuru Kenyatta – Deputy Prime Minister.
- Dishon Kirima – Leader of the New Democrats.
- James ole Kiyiapi – Former Permanent Secretary in the Education Ministry.
- Musalia Mudavadi – Deputy Prime Minister.
- Paul Muite – Lawyer and former MP for Kikuyu Constituency
- Mutava Musyimi – MP for Gachoka Constituency.
- Kalonzo Musyoka – Vice President.
- Ceaser Muthike – Leader of Restoration of Unity.
- George Kenyatta Muumbo – Battalion S5 (U.S. ARMY), Political Scientist and Paralegal
- Joseph Nyagah – Cooperative Development and Marketing.
- Raila Odinga – Prime Minister
- William Ruto – MP for Eldoret North Constituency
- Raphael Tuju – Former MP for Rarieda Constituency
- George Luchiri Wajackoyah – Diaspora candidate
- Eugene Wamalwa – Justice Minister and MP for Saboti Constituency
- Moses Wetangula – Minister for Trade

Ultimately Joseph Hellon, George Luchiri Wajackoyah, Dishon Kirima and Kingwa Kamencu did not submit papers to the IEBC. William Ruto, Mutava Musyimi and Joseph Nyagah opted to support Uhuru Kenyatta with Ruto being selected as his running mate. Those who stepped down in favour of Raila Odinga included Cyrus Jirongo, Moses Wetangula, Sylvester Wakoli Bifwoli and Kalonzo Musyoka, who became his running mate. Eugene Wamalwa opted to support Mudavadi while Raphael Tuju supported Peter Kenneth who both chose other running mates.

On 24 January 2013 the IEBC begun collecting the initial batch of documents to be used for processing the names of presidential candidates who would contest the elections. Candidate were required to present a letter expressing intention to contest the presidency and lists of 2,000 signatures from supporters in more than half of the 47 counties.

==== ICC and Integrity court cases ====
A court case was filed seeking to restrain the Independent Electoral and Boundaries Commission from accepting the nomination of any candidate who has been committed to trial for serious criminal charges under the Kenyan and International law. At the time of the elections, Kenyatta and Ruto were facing charges of crimes against humanity at the International Criminal Court (ICC) following the International Criminal Court investigation in Kenya as a result of the 2007–2008 post-election violence. Although the petitioners withdrew the case on 29 November 2012, a new petition was filed the following day by an NGO that was an interested party in the initial case. On 22 January 2013 High Court Judge David Majanja ruled that three integrity cases filed against presidential candidates and their deputies would be heard jointly. The cases sought to bar Prime Minister Raila Odinga, Vice-President Kalonzo Musyoka, Deputy Prime Ministers Uhuru Kenyatta and Musalia Mudavadi and William Ruto from contesting in the presidential elections. On 25 January 2013 Chief Justice Willy Mutunga appointed five judges to hear the three cases jointly; Mbogholi Msagha, Luka Kimaru, Hellen Omondi, George Kimondo and Pauline Nyamweya. Hearings began on 7 February 2013. On 15 February the High Court unanimously rejected the petition.

=== Debates ===
The Kenyan media announced their sponsorship of presidential debates set to be broadcast between 26 November 2012 and 11 February 2013 with coverage from eight television stations and 32 radio stations. The debates were postponed to January 2013 to allow completion of the nomination process. On 25 January, the media confirmed the debates would be held on 11 February 2013 and 25 February 2013. Other organisation later sponsored similar though less publicised presidential and vice presidential debates.

The first debate was held on 11 February 2013 at the Brookhouse International School and moderated by Julie Gichuru and Linus Kaikai. Initially, only the six leading candidates were slated to participate. However, a legal challenge by Paul Muite, ensured that himself and Mohammed Dida were added to the participant list. Their addition was so last-minute, that they had to use makeshift podiums that were noticeably different from those of the other candidates. The debate was split into two with a break in-between.

The second media sponsored debate was held on 25 February 2013 at the Brookhouse International School and was moderated by Joe Ageyo and Uduak Amimo. Initially, Kenyatta had threatened to boycott the second debate alleging bias on the part of moderator Linus Kaikai. According to a Jubilee campaign press release, the first debate was 'skewed, shambolic and farcical', while the CORD campaign retorted by accusing Kenyatta of dodging tough questions. Eventually, Kenyatta agreed to participate, and once again, all presidential candidates were involved.

Several churches and Christian organisations supported by Daystar University held presidential and vice-presidential debates, which were both broadcast on the Kenya Broadcasting Corporation TV station and intermittently on several other TV stations. The debates were held at the Anglican Church of Kenya's All Saints Cathedral. The focus of these debates were issues and question that the Christians bodies identified as important to them. Aside from the lower publicity, the debates were also characterized by poor turnout by the candidates.

The Central Organization of Trade Unions (COTU) also held a debate which received low publicity and participation of some of the candidates.

=== Issues ===
During the campaign Odinga caused as stir when he implied that Kenyatta was among those in possession of huge tracts of land across the country and could therefore not reform the sector. Kenyatta responded by claiming he was clean and that Odinga should respond over his involvement with the Kisumu Molasses Plant. The National Cohesion and Integration Commission (NCIC) however through its chairman Mzalendo Kibunja stated that such statements were a form of incitement.

Kibunja was contradicted by Constitution Implementation Commission (CIC) chairman Charles Nyachae who said candidates should not be prevented from discussing land issues during their campaigns. The recently appointed police Inspector General David Kimaiyo whose name appears in the Ndungu Land Commission's report on illegal/irregular allocation of public land also added his voice asking for politicians not to debate land matters. Rejection of debate on land matters also came from the Anglican Church of Kenya.

== Conduct ==
In mid-August 2012, tribal conflict led to the highest death toll through deliberate killings since the last election. Though the specific instance had no clear motive, past clashes have occurred due to the alleged misuse of land and water resources, however this instance was reportedly larger in scale and intensity. Speculation was made of links to the election amid an increase in political tensions. During and in the aftermath of the political party nominations held between 17 and 18 January 2013 unrest was seen in several parts of the country most notably in Nairobi, Nyanza and Central Provinces

The 2013 elections were largely peaceful, other than an incident in the early hours of 4 March just before polls opened, when a gang killed at least six police officers in the region of Changamwe, Mombasa. and in Kwale county. The authorities immediately blamed the Mombasa Republican Council (a fringe separatist group that had opposed the elections and believes that Kenya's coastal zone should be a separate country) and arrested some of its members over the incident. Nevertheless, turnout in the affected counties was still high.

== Opinion polls ==
=== President ===
==== First round ====
Pollster	Date	Sample	Kenyatta	Odinga	Mudavadi	Kenneth	Others
Consumer Insight	26 February 2013	–	44.30%	46.80%	4.20%	–	
Strategic Research	26 February 2013	–	43.80%	45.70%	5.70%	–	
Infotrak Research and Consulting	26 February 2013	–	44.50%	46%	4.30%	–	
Infotrak Research and Consulting	24–26 February 2013	3,244	45%	46%	5%	2%	2.6%
Ipsos Synovate	15–19 February 2013	5,971	44.80%	44.40%	5.20%	1.60%	1.1%
Consumer Insight	14–17 February 2013	–	43%	45%	5%	3%	3%
Strategic Research	14–17 February 2013	2,500	43.90%	44.40%	6.40%	2.80%	1.9%
Infotrak Research & Consulting	14–17 February 2013	2,572	44.40%	45.90%	6%	1.90%	0.5%
Ipsos Synovate	14–15 February 2013	2,500	43%	43%	5%	–	
Infotrak Research & Consulting	15 February 2013	1,650	42%	45%	5%	4%	1.3%
Ipsos Synovate	13 February 2013	1,074	40%	37%	4%	7%	12%
Ipsos Synovate	31 January–2 February 2013	2,365	40%	45%	5%	2%	9%
Infotrak Research & Consulting	30 January–2 February 2013	2,500	43%	45%	7%	2%	3.2%
Strategic Research	30 January–2 February 2013	2,100	42%	44%	7%	2%	4%
Smart Octopus	20–22 January 2013	2,400	45%	32%	11%	2%	7%
Ipsos-Synovate	12–20 January 2013	5,895	40%	46%	5%	1%	6%
Infotrak Research & Consulting	28 December 2012 – 2 January 2013	1,500	39%	51%	3%	3%	0.4%
Infotrak Research & Consulting	29 October–1 November 2012	1,500	24%	35.40%	10%	2%	28.5%
Ipsos-Synovate	24–28 September 2012	2,229	30%	36%	7%	–	14%
Infotrak Research & Consulting	17–18 August 2012	2,400	17.30%	35%	8.50%	2%	35.5%
Ipsos-Synovate	6–17 April 2012	2,000	22%	34%	5%	1%	38%
Infotrak Harris Poll	11–13 March 2012	2,400	22%	42%	5%	1%	26%
Ipsos-Synovate	12–19 December 2011	2,000	22%	32%	–	1%	40%
Ipsos-Synovate	15–23 October 2011	2,000	24%	34%	–	–	26%
Infotrak Harris Poll	20–23 September 2011	1,500	19%	41%	–	–	29%
Smart Octopus Limited	15 August 2011	–	23%	26%	–	–	44%
Synovate Research Reinvented	15 July 2011	3,070	21.40%	42.60%	–	–	25.6%
Synovate Research Reinvented	15 April 2011	–	13%	38%	–	–	35%

==== Second round ====
Pollster	Date	Sample	Kenyatta	Odinga	Undecided
Consumer Insight	26 February 2013	–	46.3%	50.6%	–
Strategic Research	26 February 2013	–	45.7%	51.7%	–
Infotrak Research and Consulting	26 February 2013	–	47.2%	49.5%	
Ipsos-Synovate	24–28 September 2012	2,229	50%	42%	8%

== Results ==
=== President ===
Candidate	Running mate	Party	Votes	%
Uhuru Kenyatta	William Ruto	Jubilee Alliance	6,173,433	50.51
Raila Odinga	Kalonzo Musyoka	Coalition for Reforms and Democracy	5,340,546	43.70
Musalia Mudavadi	Jeremiah Ngayu Kioni	Amani Coalition	483,981	3.96
Peter Kenneth	Ronald Osumba	Eagle Alliance	72,786	0.60
Mohammed Abduba Dida	Joshua Odongo	Alliance for Real Change	52,848	0.43
Martha Karua	Augustine Lotodo	National Rainbow Coalition – Kenya	43,881	0.36
James ole Kiyiapi	Winnie Kaburu	Restore and Build Kenya	40,998	0.34
Paul Muite	Shem Ochuodho	Safina	12,580	0.10
Total			12,221,053	100.00
Valid votes			12,221,053	99.12
Invalid/blank votes			108,975	0.88
Total votes			12,330,028	100.00
Registered voters/turnout			14,388,781	85.69
Source: IEBC

=== Senate ===
Party	Votes	%	Seats				
Party	Votes	%	Constituency	Women	Youth	Disabled	Total
The National Alliance	3,438,900	28.35	11	4	1	1	17
Orange Democratic Movement	2,669,514	22.01	11	4	1	1	17
United Republican Party	1,237,784	10.20	9	3	0	0	12
Wiper Democratic Movement – Kenya	836,850	6.90	4	1	0	0	5
United Democratic Forum Party	514,358	4.24	2	1	0	0	3
Alliance Party of Kenya	499,722	4.12	2	1	0	0	3
Kenya African National Union	441,645	3.64	2	1	0	0	3
FORD–Kenya	418,630	3.45	4	0	0	0	4
National Rainbow Coalition	340,744	2.81	1	0	0	0	1
New Ford Kenya	191,633	1.58	0	1	0	0	1
Grand National Union	177,823	1.47	0	0	0	0	0
Federal Party of Kenya	172,248	1.42	1	0	0	0	1
Peoples Democratic Party	162,384	1.34	0	0	0	0	0
FORD–People	119,624	0.99	0	0	0	0	0
Party of Independent Candidates of Kenya	89,151	0.73	0	0	0	0	0
Democratic Party	84,196	0.69	0	0	0	0	0
NARC–Kenya	84,003	0.69	0	0	0	0	0
Republican Congress Party	73,666	0.61	0	0	0	0	0
Kenya National Congress	54,897	0.45	0	0	0	0	0
National Vision Party	43,556	0.36	0	0	0	0	0
Shirikisho Party of Kenya	29,940	0.25	0	0	0	0	0
Agano Party	28,231	0.23	0	0	0	0	0
Chama Cha Mapinduzi	27,814	0.23	0	0	0	0	0
Labour Party	26,083	0.22	0	0	0	0	0
Social Democratic Party	24,650	0.20	0	0	0	0	0
New Democrats	22,339	0.18	0	0	0	0	0
KADU–Asili	20,139	0.17	0	0	0	0	0
Safina	19,892	0.16	0	0	0	0	0
Unity Party of Kenya	19,870	0.16	0	0	0	0	0
Peoples Party of Kenya	18,215	0.15	0	0	0	0	0
Farmers Party	15,289	0.13	0	0	0	0	0
Chama Cha Uzalendo	14,731	0.12	0	0	0	0	0
National Democratic Movement	8,331	0.07	0	0	0	0	0
Mwangaza Party	6,759	0.06	0	0	0	0	0
Mkenya Solidarity Movement	5,257	0.04	0	0	0	0	0
Party of Action	5,108	0.04	0	0	0	0	0
FORD–Asili	4,478	0.04	0	0	0	0	0
Restore and Build Kenya	3,098	0.03	0	0	0	0	0
Chama Cha Mwananchi	2,958	0.02	0	0	0	0	0
Kenya Social Congress	2,908	0.02	0	0	0	0	0
United Democratic Movement	2,807	0.02	0	0	0	0	0
Progressive Party of Kenya	2,673	0.02	0	0	0	0	0
The Independent Party	2,552	0.02	0	0	0	0	0
Maendeleo Democratic Party	260	0.00	0	0	0	0	0
Independents	165,584	1.36	0	0	0	0	0
Total	12,131,294	100.00	47	16	2	2	67
Source: IEBC, IPU

=== National Assembly ===
Party	Constituency			County (women)			Seats	
Party	Votes	%	Seats	Votes	%	Seats	Appointed	Total
The National Alliance	3,044,810	24.97	72	3,380,192	27.93	13	3	88
Orange Democratic Movement	2,608,898	21.39	78	2,776,214	22.94	15	3	96
United Republican Party	1,509,802	12.38	62	1,504,160	12.43	11	3	76
Wiper Democratic Movement – Kenya	682,597	5.60	19	665,513	5.50	6	1	26
United Democratic Forum Party	452,543	3.71	11	284,439	2.35	0	1	12
FORD–Kenya	429,670	3.52	10	249,973	2.07	0	0	10
National Rainbow Coalition	366,256	3.00	3	157,090	1.30	0	0	3
Alliance Party of Kenya	292,652	2.40	5	191,260	1.58	0	0	5
Kenya African National Union	286,393	2.35	6	140,635	1.16	0	0	6
Grand National Union of Kenya	260,562	2.14	0	196,797	1.63	0	0	0
Federal Party of Kenya	195,742	1.61	3	180,895	1.49	0	0	3
Kenya National Congress	196,609	1.61	2	368,157	3.04	0	0	2
Democratic Party	174,453	1.43	0	105,269	0.87	0	0	0
New Ford Kenya	143,395	1.18	4	203,929	1.69	2	1	7
Chama Cha Uzalendo	132,246	1.08	2	219,990	1.82	0	0	2
The Independent Party	132,159	1.08	1	54,558	0.45	0	0	1
NARC–Kenya	99,715	0.82	1	162,973	1.35	0	0	1
Peoples Democratic Party	92,278	0.76	1	133,783	1.11	0	0	1
FORD–People	91,218	0.75	3	48,734	0.40	0	0	3
Muungano Party	77,233	0.63	1	9,899	0.08	0	0	1
National Vision Party	74,737	0.61	0	53,876	0.45	0	0	0
Agano Party	62,473	0.51	0	21,009	0.17	0	0	0
Party of Independent Candidates of Kenya	54,337	0.45	0	73,143	0.60	0	0	0
Mazingira Green Party of Kenya	51,331	0.42	0	128,483	1.06	0	0	0
National Agenda Party	48,149	0.39	0	48,215	0.40	0	0	0
Saba Saba Asili	46,793	0.38	0				0	0
Restore and Build Kenya	37,280	0.31	0	51,439	0.43	0	0	0
United Democratic Movement	34,904	0.29	0	19,068	0.16	0	0	0
Maendeleo Democratic Party	34,564	0.28	1	84,744	0.70	0	0	1
Progressive Party of Kenya	32,768	0.27	0	28,366	0.23	0	0	0
Labour Party	31,328	0.26	0	93,522	0.77	0	0	0
Mwangaza Party	29,670	0.24	0	6,756	0.06	0	0	0
Farmers Party	24,776	0.20	0	36,021	0.30	0	0	0
Safina	23,529	0.19	0	55,724	0.46	0	0	0
New Democrats	22,401	0.18	0	21,531	0.18	0	0	0
Kenya National Democratic Alliance	22,177	0.18	0	2,528	0.02	0	0	0
Peoples Party of Kenya	21,454	0.18	0	29,693	0.25	0	0	0
KADU–Asili	19,907	0.16	1	17,834	0.15	0	0	1
Social Democratic Party of Kenya	18,284	0.15	0	7,684	0.06	0	0	0
Republican Congress Party	15,733	0.13	0	41,631	0.34	0	0	0
Unity Party of Kenya	15,215	0.12	0	19,625	0.16	0	0	0
Kenya Social Congress	12,663	0.10	0	4,895	0.04	0	0	0
Sisi Kwa Sisi	12,405	0.10	0				0	0
Mzalendo Saba Saba	12,131	0.10	0	10,854	0.09	0	0	0
National Labour Party	10,199	0.08	0				0	0
Shirikisho Party of Kenya	8,610	0.07	0	2,490	0.02	0	0	0
People's Patriotic Party	7,350	0.06	0	4,935	0.04	0	0	0
Party of Democratic Unity	7,224	0.06	0	11,970	0.10	0	0	0
Chama Cha Mwananchi	6,273	0.05	0				0	0
Chama Cha Mapinduzi	5,235	0.04	0	103,409	0.85	0	0	0
Mkenya Solidarity Movement	5,223	0.04	0	7,076	0.06	0	0	0
Party of Action	2,675	0.02	0				0	0
FORD–Asili	1,639	0.01	0	5,403	0.04	0	0	0
National Democratic Movement	1,443	0.01	0	6,021	0.05	0	0	0
National Party of Kenya	1,372	0.01	0				0	0
UDP	893	0.01	0				0	0
NAC	757	0.01	0				0	0
Republican Liberty Party	341	0.00	0				0	0
National Democrats	182	0.00	0				0	0
Alliance of Real Change	96	0.00	0				0	0
Independents	107,898	0.88	4	69,163	0.57	0	0	4
Total	12,195,650	100.00	290	12,101,568	100.00	47	12	349
Source: IEBC

=== Local elections ===
The 2013 general election will be the first where there would be election of County governors and their deputies for the 47 newly created counties. A total of 237 candidates ran for office. Each county was divided into wards in order to elect County Assembly representatives, with 9,885 candidates running.

== See also ==
- Inauguration of Uhuru Kenyatta
- List of members of the National Assembly of Kenya (2013–18)
- List of members of the Senate of Kenya (2013–18)
