= 2013 Nyamira local elections =

Local elections in Kenya

Local elections were held in Nyamira County to elect a governor and County Assembly on 4 March 2013. Under the new constitution, which was passed in a 2010 referendum, the 2013 general elections were the first in which Governors and members of the County Assemblies for the newly created counties were elected. They will also be the first general elections run by the Independent Electoral and Boundaries Commission (IEBC), which has released the official list of candidates.

== Gubernatorial election ==
Candidate	Running Mate	Coalition	Party	Votes
Abincha, Dennis Matara	Oange, Charles Momanyi		The National Alliance	--
Aumbi, Charles Mosongo	Agata, Zedekia Nyandieka	Cord	Federal Party of Kenya	--
James, Evans Misati	Nyakweba, Samwel Lewis Jomo		Progressive Party	--
Job, Momany Nyasimi	Mokaya, Daniel Momany		Republican Liberal Party	--
Kin'oina, Peter Mong'are	Bosibori, Rachel		WDM-K	--
Machana, Fredrick Ombui	Ondieki, Peterson Guto		Party of Independent Candidates of Kenya	--
Mochama, Charles Onsongo	Moturi, Zachary Nyayiemi		TIP	--
Ndubi, Kinaro Kimaiga	Ondieki, Charles Magugu		Kenya National Congress	--
Nyakiba, William Moruri	Saiti, Mary Buyaki		Kenya African National Union	--
Nyanchama, George Matunda	Obiero, William Nyangate		Restore and Build Kenya	--
Nyaribo, George Nyabera	Aero, Zacharia Apima		United Democratic Forum Party	--
Obiero, John Nyagarama	Nyaribo, Amos Kimwomi		Orange Democratic Movement	--
Okioma, Samson Mwancha Nyang'au	Bikundo, John Makori		FORD–People	--
Omenge, Cleve Agoki Mainda	Orang'i, Edward Oire		Farmers Party	--
Ondieki, Peter Bita	Obiso, Evans Isaac		Peoples Democratic Party	--
Otwori, Charles Patterson	Moses, Oginda Justus		FORD–Kenya	--
