= 2013 Elgeyo-Marakwet local elections =

2013 Kenyan local government elections

Local elections were held in Elgeyo-Marakwet County, Kenya, to elect a governor and county assembly on 4 March 2013. Under the new constitution, which was passed in a 2010 referendum, the 2013 general elections were the first in which governors and members of the county assemblies for the newly created counties were elected.

== Gubernatorial election ==
Candidate	Running mate	Coalition	Party	Votes
Timothy KipchumbaBiwott	Andrew Kipngeno Kiptoo	Cord	Orange Democratic Movement	--
Moses Kiplagat Changwony	Richard KimutaiChemweno		Kenya African National Union	--
Joseph Kibiwot Litamoi	Joseph Boit		Wiper Democratic Movement – Kenya	--
Abraham Kipkeino Talel	Willy Kibet Chepkiyeng		National Vision Party	--
Alex Tanui Tolgos	Gabriel Lagat Kosgey		United Republican Party	--

== Prospective candidates ==
The following are some of the candidates who made public their intentions to run:

- Gabriel Bargechir
- Timothy Biwott
- Moses Changwony - former Tana River Development Authority managing director
- Nicholas Chepkiyeng
- Joel Kiboss - former Egerton University lecturer
- Pius Kipkore
- Albert Kochei
- Simon Komen
- Joseph Litamoi
- Yano Pangana
- Abraham Talel - former Kenya Revenue Authority commissioner
- Alex Tolgos
- Thomas Torosi
