= National Super Alliance =

- Leader: Wycliffe Musalia Mudavadi
- General Secretary: Norman Magaya
- Deputy Leader: Stephen Kalonzo Musyoka
- Principal: Raila Amolo Odinga
- Principal: Moses Wetangula
- Founded: 11 January 2017
- Dissolved: 26 August 2021
- Preceded by: Coalition for Reforms and Democracy (CORD)
- Succeeded by: Azimio la Umoja
- Ideology: Social democracy; Social liberalism; Progressivism
- Political position: Centre-left
- Members: ODM; WDM; FORD-Kenya; Amani National Congress; Chama Cha Mashinani
- Colours
- National Assembly: 125 / 349
- Senate: 28 / 67
- Governors: 18 / 47

The National Super Alliance (NASA), was a Kenyan political coalition of opposition centre-left parties that was formed in January 2017. The coalition was created to oppose President Uhuru Kenyatta and Deputy President William Ruto in the 2017 general elections. Raila Odinga, Musalia Mudavadi, Kalonzo Musyoka, Moses Wetangula and Isaac Ruto were the co-principals of the coalition.

The alliance included the Orange Democratic Movement (ODM), the Wiper Democratic Movement (Wiper), Forum for the Restoration of Democracy – Kenya (FORD–Kenya), the Amani National Congress (ANC), Chama Cha Mashinani (CCM), the National Rainbow Coalition, the Progressive Party of Kenya, Chama Cha Uzalendo (CCU) and the Muungano Party (MP).

The NASA co-principals decided to abandon the coalition after alleged mistrust, betrayal, and competing ambitions among the members. The coalition was dissolved after Wiper, CCM and FORD–Kenya wrote to the office of the registrar of political parties with intention to withdraw from the coalition. Article 15 (1) of the Coalition Agreement stated that the coalition shall be dissolved when any three of the member parties decide to leave the coalition. Kenya's registrar of political parties, Ann Nderitu, confirmed NASA's dissolution on 26 August 2021.

== Candidates ==
The NASA Coalition's presidential candidate for the 2017 general election was Raila Odinga, and the candidate for deputy-president was Kalonzo Musyoka.

Odinga and Musyoka ran under the National Super Alliance. Thus, their political parties, ODM and Wiper respectively, opted to field their own candidates for other political positions. The other political parties in the coalition also fielded candidates for various electoral positions. Thus, "NASA candidates" did not technically exist.

Of all the principals, only Musalia Mudavadi did not run for electoral office. He instead ran the NASA National Campaign Committee. Odinga and Musyoka ran for president and deputy president respectively, Wetangula ran for Bungoma County senator, and Isaac Ruto ran for governor of Bomet County.

== Manifesto ==
The NASA Coalition launched a six-point manifesto prior to the 2017 elections that focuses on

- Food security
- 'Progressive values' (democracy, affirmative action, freedom of the media, transparency, rule of law, and public participation)
- Dealing with cartels
- Kenya's debt burden
- Job creation
- Healthcare
- Affordable education

The manifesto borrowed heavily from that by the Coalition for Reforms and Democracy, for which Odinga and Musyoka were the candidates for president and deputy president in the 2013 general election.
