= National Labour Party (Kenya) =

Political party in Kenya

The National Labour Party (NLP) is a political party in Kenya.

== History ==
The NLP gained parliamentary representation in 2004 when Ananiah Mwasambu Mwaboza won a by-election in Kisauni Constituency. Mwaboza was effectively an anti-reform National Rainbow Coalition (NARC) candidate, nominated to oppose Hassan Ali Joho, the pro-reform member of the Liberal Democratic Party, who had received the official NARC nomination.

The party nominated 22 National Assembly candidates for the 2007 general elections, receiving 0.5% of the vote and winning one seat. Mwaboza was defeated in Kisauni (running as a Party of National Unity candidate), but Walter Enock Nyambati Osebe was elected in Kitutu Masaba Constituency.

In the 2013 elections the NLP nominated only eight candidates; Osebe ran on the National Alliance ticket. The party received 0.08% of the vote, losing its sole seat.
