= New Forum for the Restoration of Democracy–Kenya =

New Ford Kenya
- Leader: Eugene Wamalwa
- President: Eugene Wamalwa
- Founder: Soita Shitanda; Boni Khalwale; Fwamba NC Fwamba; Captain Charles Wanjala Masinde
- Founded: 2006
- Dissolved: 2016
- Split from: FORD-Kenya
- Merged into: Jubilee Party
- Headquarters: Ingwee House, Lavington Shopping Centre Nairobi
- Ideology: Third Way; Social democracy
- Political position: Centre
- National affiliation: Amani Coalition (2013)
- Slogan: NFK.....Ingweeeeee

Website
- http://www.newfordkenya.org

The New Forum for the Restoration of Democracy–Kenya, commonly known as New Ford Kenya was a political party in Kenya.

== History ==
The party was established in December 2006 by 12 MPs from FORD-Kenya. The new party did not put forward a presidential candidate in the 2007 general elections, but won two seats in the National Assembly. In 2011 Eugene Wamalwa joined the party and announced plans to be the party's presidential candidate in the 2013 general elections. This created an interest in the party in his native Bungoma and Trans Nzoia counties, and by October 2012, the party had registered 67,345 members and won three civic seats in Bungoma and Trans Nzoia.

In the run-up to the March 2013 elections, the party was working with other 'like minded parties' such as the National Alliance, United Republican Party and Wiper Democratic Movement. but was left out of the Jubilee Alliance. In December 2012, the party joined the Amani Coalition alongside the National Vision Party, United Democratic Movement and Kenya African National Union to field a single presidential candidate in the 2013 elections. The UDF's Musalia Mudavadi was chosen as the Coalition's candidate, finishing fourth with 4% of the vote. In the parliamentary elections, New Ford Kenya won one seat in the Senate and seven in the National Assembly.

In 2016 the party merged into the Jubilee Party.
