= Augustine Lotodo =

Kenyan politician

Member of the EALA
- In office 2007–2012
- Constituency: Kenya

Personal details
- Born: 7 May 1971 (age 55)
- Spouse: Veronica Chepkorir
- Relations: Francis Lotodo (father)
- Children: 6
- Education: Rani Durgavati Vishwavidyalaya; Jiwaji University; Panjab University

Augustine Chemonges Loile Lotodo is a Kenyan who ran for Deputy President in the March 2013 Kenyan Presidential election on a NARC-Kenya ticket, as the running mate to Martha Karua.

Lotodo studied economics at Rani Durgavati Vishwavidyalaya in India and is the son of former Cabinet Minister Francis Lotodo. In 2002, he ran unsuccessfully for the Kapenguria Constituency parliamentary seat. Between 2004 and 2006, he was the Director of the Lake Victoria North Water Services Board based in Kakamega. He was a member of in the East African Legislative Assembly (EALA) based in Arusha, Tanzania between 2007 and 2012.
