= Madaraka People's Movement =

Political party in Kenya

- Founded: 2005
- Ideology: Socialism; Progressivism
- Political position: Left-wing

The Madaraka People's Movement, formerly known as Madaraka Party of Kenya, is a political party in Kenya which identifies itself as "youth-focused".

Formed in June 2005, Madaraka Party has championed the cause of the oppressed youth, students, women, workers, peasants, unemployed, disabled and the poor. Madaraka Party was the only party that insisted on "No Constitutional Reforms, No Elections" and boycotted the fraudulent 2007 elections. The party was provisionally registered as a political party on May 20, 2010, in compliance with the Political Parties Act (2007).

Following the enactment of the Political Parties Act (2007) of Kenya, all political parties were required to re-register anew by the deadline of January 1, 2009 or face de-registration. Madaraka was not able to meet the deadline, but it submitted a request for re-registration in October 2009. Madaraka Party of Kenya held its first Annual National Conference on December 4–6, 2009 at the Kenya Polytechnic, Nairobi, where new interim officials were selected. Madaraka Party changed its name to Madaraka People's Movement, and is still trying to get re-registered.
