= Nfk =

NFK, NFk, or Nfk may refer to:

- Eritrean nakfa, the currency of Eritrea
- Necip Fazıl Kısakürek (1904–1983), Turkish poet, novelist, playwright, and Islamist ideologue known by his initials NFK
- New Farakka Junction railway station, in West Bengal, India
- New Forum for the Restoration of Democracy–Kenya, a former political party
- Nordland Fylkeskommune, the County Council of Nordland
- Norfolk Island
- Norfolk, UK county
  - Norfolk dialect
- Norfolk, Virginia, US city
  - Norfolk station (Amtrak), its intercity train station
- North fork, used to disambiguate otherwise identically named tributaries of a river
