= Winnie Kaburu =

Kenyan businesswoman (born 1962)

Winnie Kaburu Kinyua
- Born: 1962 (age 63–64); Meru County, Kenya
- Education: University of Nairobi
- Political party: Wiper Democratic Movement

Winnie Kaburu Kinyua is a Kenyan businesswoman who ran for Deputy President in the March 2013 Kenyan Presidential election as the running mate of James ole Kiyiapi, of the Restore and Build Kenya party.

Winnie Kaburu ran for governor of Meru County in the 2017 elections as the candidate for Wiper Democratic Movement.

She is a native of Meru County, Kenya, and holds a bachelor's degree in Political Science and a Masters in Gender and Development, both from the University of Nairobi. She currently owns businesses across multiple sectors and received a Head of State Commendation in 2003 from President Kibaki for her work in the Kenyan business community.

Kaburu Kinyua is a co-founder and the former Vice Chair of the Kenya Private Sector Alliance (KEPSA), as well as a co-founder of the Fair Trade Organisation. She is also an advocate for women in business, founding the National Association of Self Employed Women of Kenya (NASWOK).
