= New Democrats (Kenya) =

- Abbreviation: TND
- National Assembly: 1 / 349

Website
- newdemocratskenya.org

The New Democrats is a political party in Kenya.

== Election results ==
=== Senate ===
Election	Votes	%	Seats
2013	22,339	0.18	0
2017	2,956	0.02	0

=== National Assembly ===
Election	Votes	%	Seats
2007	14,986	0.16	0
2013	22,401	0.18	0
2017	24,343	0.16	1

== See also ==
- List of political parties in Kenya
