= Conservative Party (Kenya) =

Political party in Kenya

Conservative Party of Kenya
- Chairman: Nelson Dzuya
- Secretary-General: Veronica Nduati
- National Treasurer: Alfred Mutai
- Organizing Secretary: Abdul Haji
- Ideology: Conservatism

The Conservative Party of Kenya is a political party in the Republic of Kenya. It did not have much history of electoral success, or even activity, until it was reported that members of the Jubilee coalition of parties intended to convert it into a single party to contest the 2017 general election, within which Uhuru Kenyatta and William Ruto intended to gain re-election as president and deputy president respectively.
