= Kingwa Kamencu =

Kenyan writer

- Citizenship: Kenyan
- Education: University of Nairobi (BA); University of Oxford (MSt, MSc)
- Alma mater: Wolfson College, Oxford
- Occupations: Writer; journalist; social innovator
- Known for: 2013 presidential candidacy declaration
- Notable work: To Grasp at a Star (2005)
- Awards: Rhodes Scholarship (2009); Jomo Kenyatta Prize for Literature

Kingwa Kamencu is a Kenyan writer notable for her declaration to run for the presidency in the 2013 Kenyan Presidential election. In September 2011 she created a buzz on the Kenyan political scene, becoming the youngest woman to declare her candidacy for Kenya's presidency at the age of 27. She was, however, not among those who eventually submitted her papers to contest.

== Education ==
She studied history and literature at the University of Nairobi, graduating with a first class honours. In 2009 she received a Rhodes Scholarship to study at Wolfson College, Oxford. She holds graduate degrees in African studies and creative writing from the University of Oxford where she was the President of the African Society.

== Views ==
Part of the dynamic Pan-African energy exploding on the continent, her candidature explored ways in which Kenya's political system could serve the country's citizens more ably. Instituting non-ethnicized politics, self-sufficiency in food production, and planning mechanisms to ensure preparation for the recurrent national crises (famine and drought) were key in her agenda. Her thoughts were recorded in the Guardian, a British newspaper, in November 2011.

After the 2013 nominations, Kingwa, who was then expected to fly the Labour Party of Kenya flag, opted out of the race to concentrate on building her support base in readiness for 2017 general elections, when she is expected to make a huge come back. She is one of the most vocal women in Kenya after Martha Karua. The latter was the second woman to vie for the presidential seat after Charity Ngilu in 1997.
