= 2007 Kenyan general election =

- 27 December 2007
- Registered: 14,296,180
- Presidential election
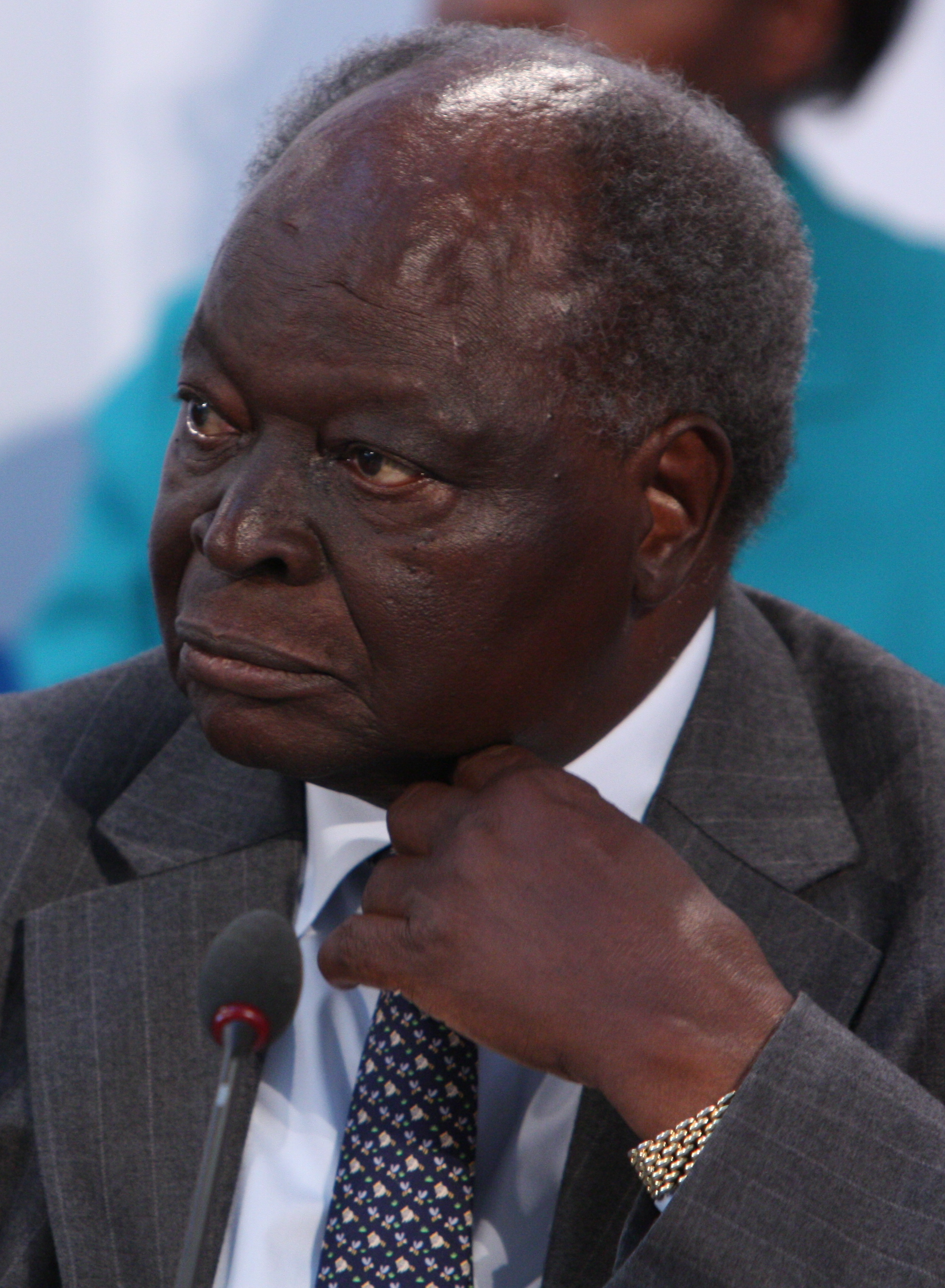

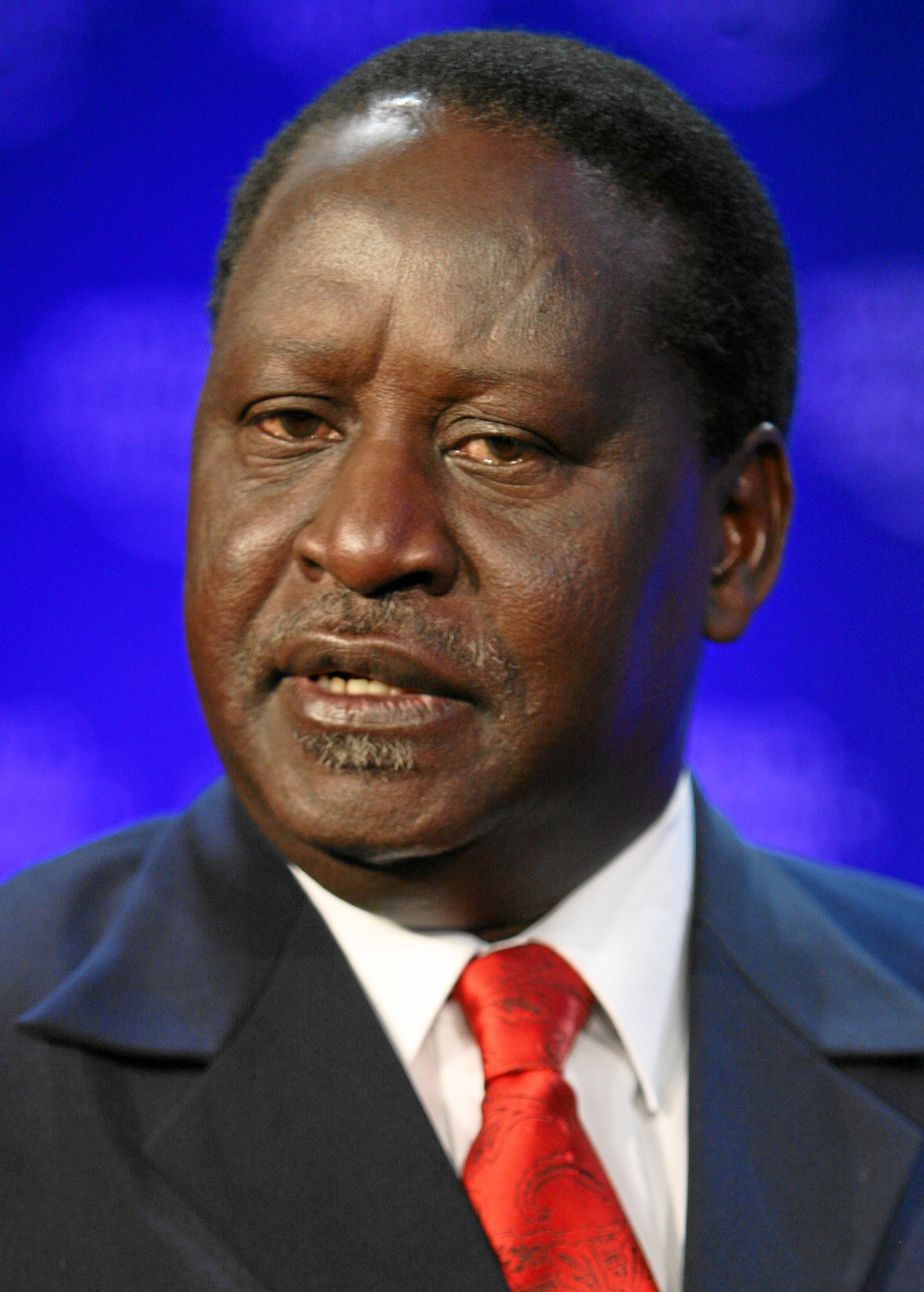

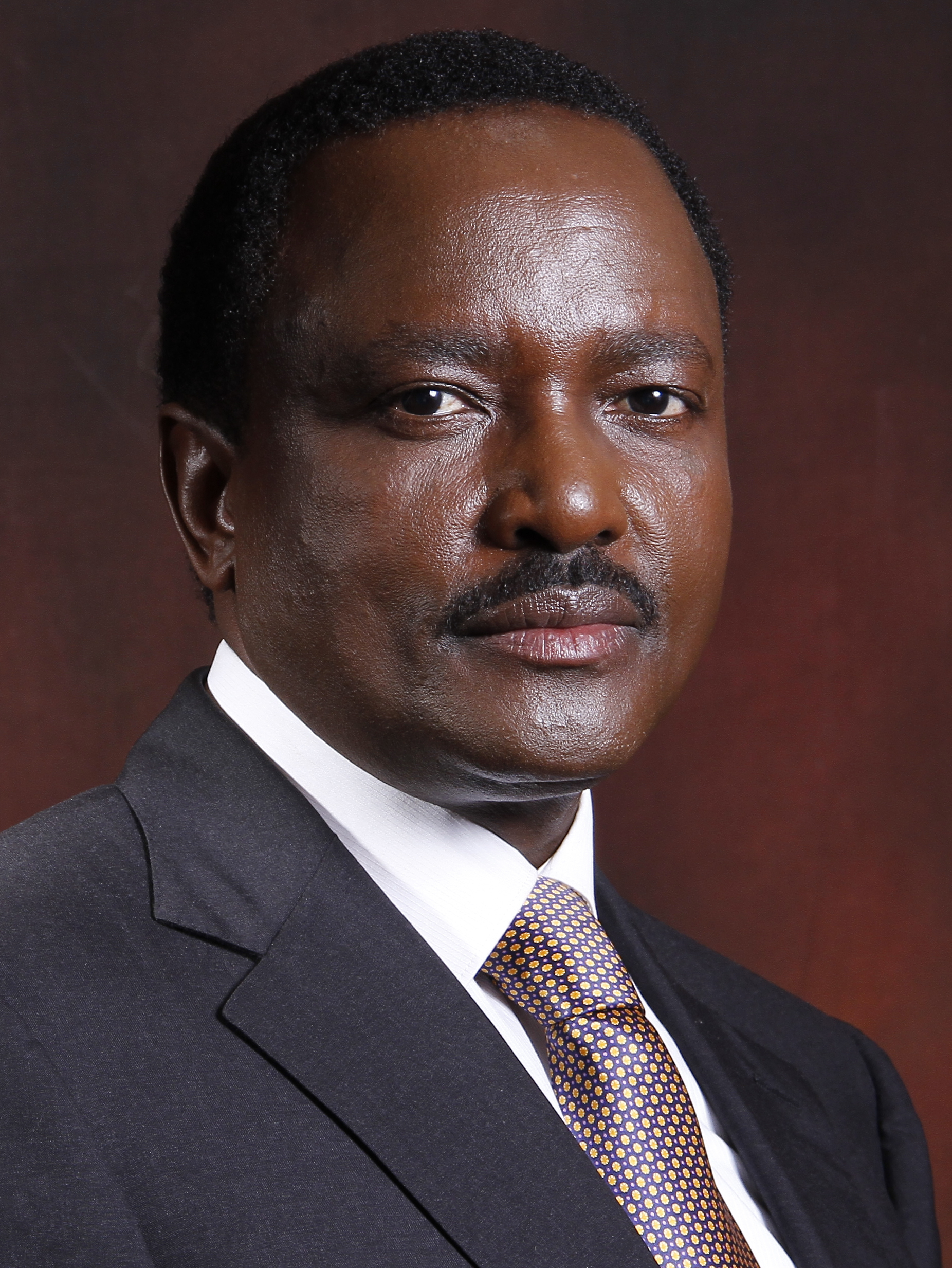
Nominee	Mwai Kibaki	Raila Odinga	Kalonzo Musyoka
Party	PNU	ODM	ODM–Kenya
Popular vote	4,584,721	4,352,993	879,903
Percentage	46.42%	44.07%	8.91%
- Results by province
President before election
Mwai Kibaki
PNU
Elected President
Mwai Kibaki
PNU
- Parliamentary election
- All 210 seats in the National Assembly; 106 seats needed for a majority
Party	Leader	Vote %	Seats	+/–
ODM	Raila Odinga	30.83	99	New
PNU	Mwai Kibaki	20.89	43	New
ODM–Kenya	Kalonzo Musyoka	6.57	16	New
KANU	Uhuru Kenyatta	6.36	15	−49
Safina	Jimmy Wanjigi	3.80	5	+3
NARC	Charity Ngilu	3.41	3	0
Democratic	Joseph K. Munyao	2.46	2	−37
FORD–People	Simeon Nyachae	2.00	3	−11
KADDU	Cyrus Jirongo	1.97	1	0
KENDA	Kamlesh Pattni	1.69	1	+1
NARC–Kenya	Martha Karua	1.65	4	New
Sisi Kwa Sisi	–	1.55	2	0
CCU	Wavinya Ndeti	1.19	2	0
UDM	Ali Roba	1.12	1	+1
MGPK	Wangarĩ Maathai	0.99	1	+1
New Ford Kenya	Eugene Wamalwa	0.92	2	New
PICK	John Harun Mwau	0.88	2	+2
FORD–Kenya	Moses Wetang'ula	0.78	1	−20
FORD–Asili	Kenneth Matiba	0.68	1	−1
NLP	Ananiah Mwaboza	0.54	1	0
KADU–Asili	Francis Bayah	0.32	1	0
PDP	Richard Momoima	0.16	1	+1
PPK	David Mwaura	0.15	1	+1
This lists parties that won seats. See the complete results below.
Speaker of the National Assembly before	Speaker of the National Assembly after
Francis ole Kaparo; KANU	Kenneth Marende; ODM

General elections were held in Kenya on 27 December 2007. Voters elected the President and members of the National Assembly. They coincided with the 2007 Kenyan local elections.

Incumbent Mwai Kibaki, running on a Party of National Unity (PNU) ticket, defeated Raila Odinga, leader of the Orange Democratic Movement (ODM) and Kalonzo Musyoka of Orange Democratic Movement–Kenya. The elections were strongly marked by ethnic hostility, with Kibaki, a member of the traditionally dominant Kikuyu ethnic group, gaining much support amongst the Kikuyu and neighbouring groups in central Kenya, including the Embu and Meru. Odinga, as a member of the Luo ethnic group, succeeded in creating a wider base by building a coalition with regional leaders from the Luhya in Western Kenya, the Kalenjin from the Rift Valley and Muslim leaders from the Coast Province. Kibaki was declared the winner with 46% of the vote and was sworn in at State House on 30 December. However, opposition leader Raila Odinga also claimed victory, and civil unrest broke out, resulting in the deaths of several hundred people and the displacement of up to 600,000. This was ended by the National Accord and Reconciliation Act, which led to Odinga being appointed as Prime Minister.

In the National Assembly elections, the ODM won 99 of the 208 seats, with the PNU finishing second with 43 seats. The Kenya African National Union, which had ruled the country from independence until 2002, was reduced to being the fourth-largest party with only 15 seats. Only 71 of the 190 sitting MPs were re-elected, twenty ministers lost their seats, and a record 15 female MPs were elected.

There is agreement in the international community that the presidential elections were at least partially manipulated. In July 2008, an exit poll commissioned by the US was released, suggesting that Odinga was predicted to have won the presidency by a comfortable margin of 6%, 46% to 40%, well outside the exit poll's 1.3% margin of error.

== Background ==
=== Presidential candidates ===
Incumbent president Mwai Kibaki declared his intention to run for re-election on 26 January 2007, although he had previously declared prior to the 2002 elections that he needed only one term as president. On 16 September 2007, Kibaki announced that he would run as the candidate of a new alliance called the Party of National Unity, which would include a number of parties, including KANU, the Democratic Party, NARC–Kenya, FORD-Kenya, Ford–People and Shirikisho, among others.

The Orange Democratic Movement–Kenya (ODM–Kenya) alliance was expected to field the strongest challenger to Kibaki; the main parties originally affiliated to ODM–Kenya were the Liberal Democratic Party (LDP) and KANU. At the time of the 2002 elections, the LDP had been part of the National Rainbow Coalition (NARC) movement backing Kibaki, but its ministers were dismissed from the cabinet after the 2005 constitutional referendum. KANU and LDP had originally teamed up for the 2005 referendum under the banner Orange Democratic Movement, but former president Daniel arap Moi was among the KANU faction opposing involvement with the ODM–Kenya coalition. As a result, ODM–Kenya split in two in August 2007, one remaining as ODM–Kenya and led by Kalonzo Musyoka, the other going by the name Orange Democratic Movement (ODM). KANU subsequently left the coalition entirely, and Moi announced his support for Kibaki, his former political enemy, in late August. Uhuru Kenyatta followed suit and announced his support for Kibaki in mid-September. KANU did not nominate as a presidential candidate, although it contested the National Assembly elections.

Several ODM members vied for presidency, including Musyoka, Raila Odinga, Kenyatta (before KANU's withdrawal), William Ruto, Najib Balala, Musalia Mudavadi and Joseph Nyagah. Following the August 2007 split, ODM–Kenya appointed Musyoka as its candidate on 31 August, and the ODM selected Odinga as its candidate on 1 September.

Presidential candidates presented their nomination papers on 14 and 15 November to the Electoral Commission of Kenya (ECK), and nine candidates were cleared to be on the ballot in December. All nine presidential candidates also ran for a parliamentary seat as required by Kenyan law; the presidential election winner needed to also win a parliamentary seat to be named president.

=== National Assembly ===
The ninth parliament was dissolved on Monday, 22 October 2007, with the election date of 27 December announced on 26 October 2007 by the ECK. The ECK initially set a deadline of 19 November 2007 for submitting the candidate lists to prevent candidates from defecting after failing to gain nominations from their parties but later retracted and allowed defections to minor parties. The ODM, PNU and ODM–K held their primary elections on 16 November, with all three termed as chaotic and being marred by irregularities and violence. Numerous candidates defected to smaller parties after failing to get candidature by their respective parties, including Nobel laureate Wangari Maathai, who failed to gain a PNU nomination, and former Interior Minister Chris Murungaru, who lost out to a little-known trader.

There were 14,296,180 registered voters; 68.8% of the electorate were aged between 18 and 40, with the remaining 31.2% being those over 40.

== Campaign ==
=== President ===
Kibaki began his presidential campaign on 30 September at Nyayo Stadium in Nairobi. Odinga launched his campaign in Uhuru Park on 6 October 2007. On the same day, three ODM supporters were shot (one of them fatally), allegedly by bodyguards of Stanley Livondo, who was running as the PNU candidate for Odinga's seat in the National Assembly. Livondo was arrested, along with two of his bodyguards, and later released. Pius Muiru, a televangelist and the leader of the Kenya People's Party (KPP), officially launched his bid for the presidency on 21 October 2007 at Kamukunji grounds.

Two cabinet ministers, first Health Minister Charity Ngilu and then Regional Co-operation Minister John Koech, backed Odinga in October; Kibaki dismissed Ngilu from the cabinet.

=== National Assembly ===
A record 2,548 candidates contested the National Assembly elections, more than double the 1,033 that ran in 2002. The 269 female candidates was also a record.

The ODM had the highest number of candidates with 190, followed by the Kenya National Democratic Alliance (KENDA) with 170, the PNU (135), ODM–K (135), KADDU (97), KANU (91), Safina (88), NARC (73), the Democratic Party (86) and NARC–Kenya (59). A total of 108 parties fielded parliamentary candidates, another record. For the first time, no party fielded a candidate in every constituency; every previous election had seen KANU contest every seat. The Kitutu Masaba Constituency had the highest number of candidates at 33, and all 210 constituencies had at least two candidates, meaning that there were no uncontested seats, another first.

== Opinion polls ==
Opinion polls in late October put support for Odinga at 50%, with Kibaki at 39%, and Musyoka at 8%. A poll released in early November put Odinga at 45%, Kibaki at 41% and Musyoka at 11%, while on 23 November a poll placed Odinga and Kibaki at about the same level, with 43.6% and 43.3%, respectively.

Date	Pollster	Kibaki	Musyoka	Odinga	Mudavadi	Ruto	Kenyatta
October 2006	Steadman International	41%	20%	13%		3%	5%
December 2006	Steadman International	42%	20%	14%		3%	5%
March 2007	Steadman International	51%	14%	17%	2%	2%	2%
April 2007	IRI	44.3%	15.3%	18.7%	2.7%	2.6%	3.5%
June 2007	RMS	45%	14%	28%	4%	3%	4%
July 2007	Steadman International	45%	11%	25%	3%	2%	2%
August 2007	Infotrak/Harris Interactive	42%	11%	25%	8%	6%	1%
August 2007	Steadman International	47%	13%	36%	1%		1%
September 2007	Steadman International	38%	8%	47%			
13 October 2007	Steadman International	37%	8%	53%			
23 October 2007	Steadman International	39%	8%	50%			
9 November 2007	Steadman International	41%	11%	45%			
21 November 2007	Consumer Insight	41.4%	14.7%	40.7%			
17 November 2007	Gallup	42%	11%	45%			
23 November 2007	Steadman International	43.3%	11.4%	43.6%			
7 December 2007	Steadman International	42%	10%	46%			
18 December 2007	Steadman International	43%	10%	45%			

== Results ==
=== President ===
Early results published by the Kenyan media gave Raila Odinga a narrow lead of 1,691,679 votes against Kibaki's 1,222,725 in 69 of the country's 210 constituencies. Odinga held a strong lead in vote counting on 28 December, and the ODM declared victory on 29 December; however, as more results were announced on the same day, the gap between the two candidates narrowed. Early on 30 December, Odinga accused the government of fraud, urged Kibaki to concede defeat, and called for a recount. The ECK declared Kibaki the winner later on 30 December, placing him ahead of Odinga by about 232,000 votes. Odinga asserts that the Electoral Commission falsely included at least 300,000 votes for Kibaki in his total. ECK chairman Samuel Kivuitu said that while irregularities had occurred, they were a matter for the courts, not the Electoral Commission. Following the commission's declaration of his victory, Kibaki was sworn in for his second term later on the same day, saying that he had been told by his people that he had won, calling for the "verdict of the people" to be respected and for "healing and reconciliation" to begin.

Kivuitu said that there were some problems with the count, noting that in one constituency voter turnout was reported as 115%, although the figure was later clarified by Kivuitu in an interview with Nation Television as due to a double entry of one polling station in Maragua Constituency on the parliamentary tally and not the presidential tally. According to the European Union's head election observer, Alexander Graf Lambsdorff, the elections were "flawed" and the ECK had failed to establish "the credibility of the tallying process to the satisfaction of all parties and candidates." The United Kingdom's Foreign Secretary, David Miliband, said that he had "real concerns" about the elections. While the United States initially congratulated Kibaki and called for the results to be respected, it also expressed concern, and on 2 January 2008, a spokesman for the US State Department declined to confirm US recognition of Kibaki's victory. In a telex from the US Embassy in Nairobi to the State Department in Washington DC [released in July 2012], US Ambassador Michael Ranneberger set out five scenarios as to who really won the election. He wrote, ‘In all cases the margin of victory for either side is slim and ultimately unknowable’. The telex also noted that there was ‘evidence of rigging on both sides’. Kivuitu said on 2 January that he had been pressured by PNU and ODM–K (Kibaki's and Kalonzo Musyoka's parties) into announcing the results without delay, declaring Kibaki the winner, claiming that he did not personally know who really won.

Within minutes of the commission's declaration of Kibaki's victory, ethnically based rioting and violence, primarily directed against Kikuyus, broke out across Kenya, and the government suspended live television coverage for some days. Odinga alleged that "a clique of people around Kibaki" sought to rig the election but said that democracy "is unstoppable, like the flow of the Nile." The ODM announced its intention to hold a ceremony on 31 December in which Odinga would be declared the "people's president", but police said that this could incite violence and that Odinga could be arrested if the ceremony occurred. Odinga then delayed this but called for a million-strong rally on 3 January 2008 and for his supporters to wear black armbands as a show of mourning.

Odinga said that the ODM would not negotiate with Kibaki unless he resigned, because to do so would mean acknowledging Kibaki's legitimacy; he also said that, unless stopped, the "ruling clique" could rig the next elections in five years as well, and that he was not afraid of being arrested, having been jailed many times in the past. For his part, Kibaki emphasised the importance of peace, stability, and tolerance in his 2008 New Year's message, speaking of the elections as a concluded event and warning that lawbreakers would be punished.

Candidate	Party	Votes	%
Mwai Kibaki	Party of National Unity	4,584,721	46.42
Raila Odinga	Orange Democratic Movement	4,352,993	44.07
Kalonzo Musyoka	Orange Democratic Movement–Kenya	879,903	8.91
Joseph Karani	Kenya Patriotic Trust Party	21,171	0.21
Pius Muiru	Kenya Peoples' Party	9,667	0.10
Nazlin Omar	Workers Congress Party of Kenya	8,624	0.09
Kenneth Matiba	Saba Saba Asili	8,046	0.08
David Waweru Ng'ethe	Chama Cha Uma	5,976	0.06
Nixon Kukubo	Republican Party of Kenya	5,927	0.06
Total		9,877,028	100.00
Registered voters/turnout		14,296,180	–
Source: African Elections Database

=== National Assembly ===
Preliminary results showed that Vice-President Moody Awori and Wangari Maathai both lost their seats. Other notable politicians with the same fate included Mutahi Kagwe, Musikari Kombo, Simeon Nyachae, Nicholas Biwott, Chris Murungaru, Mukhisa Kituyi, Raphael Tuju, Kipruto Kirwa, Njenga Karume and Gideon Moi, the son of former president Daniel arap Moi.

The elections were cancelled in Kamukunji and Kilgoris.

Party	Votes	%	Seats	+/–
Orange Democratic Movement	2,973,415	30.83	99	New
Party of National Unity	2,014,413	20.89	43	New
Orange Democratic Movement–Kenya	633,880	6.57	16	New
Kenya African National Union	613,864	6.36	15	−49
Safina	366,629	3.80	5	+3
National Rainbow Coalition	328,945	3.41	3	–
Democratic Party	237,205	2.46	2	−37
FORD–People	192,489	2.00	3	−11
Kenya African Democratic Development Union	190,051	1.97	1	–
Kenya National Democratic Alliance	162,538	1.69	1	+1
NARC–Kenya	158,752	1.65	4	New
Sisi Kwa Sisi	149,933	1.55	2	0
Chama Cha Uzalendo	115,243	1.19	2	–
United Democratic Movement	107,831	1.12	1	+1
Mazingira Green Party of Kenya	95,227	0.99	1	+1
New Ford Kenya	88,562	0.92	2	New
Party of Independent Candidates of Kenya	85,348	0.88	2	+2
FORD–Kenya	75,145	0.78	1	−20
FORD–Asili	66,013	0.68	1	−1
National Labour Party	51,887	0.54	1	–
The Independent Party	50,797	0.53	0	–
Social Democratic Party	39,871	0.41	0	0
Kenya National Congress	39,840	0.41	0	0
Party of Hope	35,962	0.37	0	–
National Patriotic Party of Kenya	33,289	0.35	0	–
Labour Party of Kenya	33,008	0.34	0	–
Republican Alliance Party of Kenya	31,331	0.32	0	–
KADU–Asili	30,462	0.32	1	–
Agano Party	30,085	0.31	0	–
New Sisi Kwa Sisi Kenya	28,893	0.30	0	–
Chama Cha Mwananchi	27,438	0.28	0	–
Forum for Republican Party	26,333	0.27	0	–
United Democratic Party of Kenya	23,870	0.25	0	–
Green African Party	20,038	0.21	0	–
Dynamic Development Party	19,972	0.21	0	–
United Democrats of Peace And Integrity in Kenya	19,648	0.20	0	–
Community Development Party	18,994	0.20	0	–
Farmers Party	18,985	0.20	0	–
Federal Party of Kenya	17,491	0.18	0	–
Peoples Democratic Party	15,655	0.16	1	+1
National Integrity Party	15,443	0.16	0	–
Republican Liberty Party	15,379	0.16	0	–
Shirikisho Party of Kenya	15,228	0.16	0	–
New Democrats	14,986	0.16	0	–
Peoples Party of Kenya	14,892	0.15	1	+1
Peoples' Solidarity Union of Kenya	14,315	0.15	0	–
New Revival Generation Party	14,302	0.15	0	–
United People's Congress	12,750	0.13	0	–
Pambazuka Party of Kenya	12,390	0.13	0	–
Kenya Citizens Congress	12,347	0.13	0	–
Growth and Development Party	11,786	0.12	0	–
Social Party for Advancement and Reforms – Kenya	11,764	0.12	0	–
National Democratic Alliance	11,357	0.12	0	–
Kenya Social Congress	11,223	0.12	0	0
Liberal Democratic Movement	10,886	0.11	0	–
Republican Party of Kenya	10,494	0.11	0	–
Generation Alliance Party of Kenya	9,808	0.10	0	–
Daraja Ya Wakenya Party	9,719	0.10	0	–
National Alliance Party	9,112	0.09	0	–
Saba Saba Asili	8,301	0.09	0	–
Kifagio Party of Kenya	8,106	0.08	0	–
Progressive Party of Kenya	8,081	0.08	0	–
Kenya People's Party	8,067	0.08	0	–
Chama Cha Uma Party	7,367	0.08	0	–
New Kanu Alliance Party of Kenya	7,010	0.07	0	–
Mass Party of Kenya	6,600	0.07	0	–
National Progressive Party	6,106	0.06	0	–
Vipa Progressive Alliance	5,652	0.06	0	–
Common Wealth Development Party of Kenya	5,573	0.06	0	–
Workers Congress Party of Kenya	5,386	0.06	0	–
New Aspiration Party	5,172	0.05	0	–
Democratic Representative Party	5,020	0.05	0	–
Kenya Affiliated Democratic Unity	4,531	0.05	0	–
Kenya Nationalist Peoples Democratic Party	4,099	0.04	0	–
Freedom Party of Kenya	3,795	0.04	0	–
Movement for Democratic Advancement Party of Kenya	2,496	0.03	0	–
Citizen Democratic Party of Kenya	2,485	0.03	0	–
Democratic Labour Party of Kenya	2,439	0.03	0	–
Communal Democracy Party of Kenya	2,347	0.02	0	–
National Dynamic Development Party	2,252	0.02	0	–
National Renewal People's Party	2,009	0.02	0	–
Kenya Patriotic Trust Party	1,878	0.02	0	–
The National Integration Party of Kenya	1,799	0.02	0	–
Kenya Union of National Alliance of Peace	1,457	0.02	0	–
National Party of Kenya	1,339	0.01	0	–
Chama Cha Muafaka Na Mwangaza	1,250	0.01	0	–
Democracy Assistance Party	1,220	0.01	0	–
National Liberation Party	1,089	0.01	0	–
National Conservative Party of Kenya	1,081	0.01	0	–
Chama Cha Utu	985	0.01	0	–
Allied Democratic Party of Kenya	976	0.01	0	–
Alliance for the Restoration of Democracy in Kenya	923	0.01	0	–
Kenya National Liberation Party	898	0.01	0	–
Moral Integrity Party	885	0.01	0	–
Party for Economic Change And Democracy	879	0.01	0	–
The Nuru Party	832	0.01	0	–
Green Social Democratic Party of Kenya	706	0.01	0	–
Kenya Cultural Alliance	699	0.01	0	–
National Star Party of Kenya	691	0.01	0	–
Social Welfare Alliance Party of Kenya	620	0.01	0	–
Wakulima Party of Kenya	598	0.01	0	–
Jubilee Peoples Party of Kenya	547	0.01	0	–
Muungano Party	517	0.01	0	–
Pan Africa Assemblies	475	0.00	0	–
Reform Party of Kenya	390	0.00	0	–
Forum for Orange Democratic Change Party	318	0.00	0	–
Peoples Patriotic Party of Kenya	301	0.00	0	–
Democratic Community Party	233	0.00	0	–
Restoration Democrats of Kenya	219	0.00	0	–
Universal Democratic Party of Kenya	204	0.00	0	–
Kenya Political Caucus Party of Kenya	203	0.00	0	–
Kenya Peoples Convention Party	181	0.00	0	–
The National Republican Party of Kenya	172	0.00	0	–
Kenya Republican Reformation Party	76	0.00	0	–
Movement for Democratic Advancement Party	62	0.00	0	–
Union of Democratic Party	50	0.00	0	–
United Party of Democracy	46	0.00	0	–
Vacant			2	–
Total	9,645,206	100.00	210	0
Source: IDE

== Aftermath ==
Kikuyus, belonging to the Kikuyu ethnic group, supported Kibaki, while the Luo and Kalenjins, belonging to the Luo ethnic group, supported Odinga. The Luo began violent demonstrations in Nairobi fifteen minutes after Kibaki's announcement as the presidential election winner. Nearly all businesses closed within a day, leaving the streets empty. The post-election violence resulted in the displacement of hundreds of thousands of people from their homes during January and February 2008. Crime exploded in Kikuyu settlements in the Rift Valley and intra-urban slums in Mombasa. Most Kikuyus in the Rift Valley fled their homes and settled anywhere they could find refuge. Some Kikuyus settled in a church at Kiambaa in Eldoret, where Kalenjin youth barricaded the door from outside and set the church on fire, killing about 30 people. Farms were looted and roads were blocked, leaving people unable to work, farmers and commuters alike. Many members of large ethnic groups attacked anyone who they felt didn't belong; minorities and people that had come from other countries were common targets. Some people even fled to Uganda and other nearby countries to escape the social unrest. One sector greatly affected by the political unrest was tourism; flights and tours were cancelled, companies withdrew from Kenya, and many people lost their jobs due to lay-offs. The international media covered the tragedies extensively, giving the outside world the impression that the entire country was amidst a bloody battle, when truly, parts of Kenya were untouched by violence. Kenya lost approximately $47.6 million due to the lack of visits. The fragile state of the economy affected surrounding countries as well.

After being sworn in as president, Kibaki named a partial cabinet on 8 January 2008, composed of 17 MPs from his party PNU and ODM–Kenya, which entered into a coalition agreement, along with KANU. A number of further cabinet slots were left temporarily open, presumably to give space for negotiations with the opposition ODM, which immediately challenged the constitutionality of the new government.

By April 2008, Kenya was stable, though the conflict left “1,500 dead, 3,000 innocent women raped, and 300,000 people internally displaced." Kibaki remained president, and Odinga was named prime minister. The National Assembly results were cancelled in three of the 210 constituencies. Prior to 2007, hostility surrounding politics in Kenya existed on a much smaller scale. The introduction of multi-party politics in 1991 led to the recognition of violence as an election-time tradition. However, the fighting and aggression demonstrated in December 2007 and January and February 2008 was and has been unmatched by any election-related uprising. In August 2012, the Nakuru County Peace Accord was signed, a treaty designed to address sources of ethnic conflict and violence in the Rift Valley region of Kenya.

Both Kibaki and Odinga largely ignored United Nations efforts to set up independent tribunals to bring the leaders of the post-2007 election violence to justice.

On 10 December 2020, a high court orders the government to compensate four victims of sexual attacks by security agents during post-election violence following the 2007 Kenyan general election.

Position	Minister
Vice-President	Stephen Kalonzo Musyoka
Minister for Home Affairs	Stephen Kalonzo Musyoka
Minister of State for Defence	Mohamed Yusuf Haji
Minister of State for Provincial Administration and Internal Security	Mohamed Yusuf Haji
Minister for Education	Sam Ongeri
Minister for Energy	Kiraitu Murungi
Minister for Finance	Amos Kimunya
Minister for Foreign Affairs	Moses Wetangula
Minister for Information and Communications	Samuel Poghisio
Minister for Justice and Constitutional Affairs	Martha Karua
Minister for Local Government	Uhuru Kenyatta
Minister for Public Service	Asman Kamama
Minister for Roads and Public Works	John Michuki
Minister for Science and Technology	Noah Wekesa
Minister of State for Special Programmes	Naomi Shaban
Minister for the East African Community	Wilfred Machage
Minister for Transport	Chirau Ali Mwakwere
Minister for Water and Irrigation	John Munyes

== See also ==
- The Truth, Justice and Reconciliation Commission of Kenya
