= National Alliance of Kenya =

Political party

The National Alliance of Kenya is a political party founded by Lawrence Nginyo Kariuki.

== See also ==
- List of political parties in Kenya
