= Coalition for Reforms and Democracy =

Coalition for Reforms and Democracy (CORD)
- Leader: Raila Odinga
- General Secretary: Norman Magaya
- Co-Principal: Stephen Kalonzo Musyoka
- Co-Principal: Moses Wetangula
- Joint Chair: James Orengo, Johnson Muthama, Eseli Simiyu
- Founded: 4 December 2012
- Dissolved: March 27, 2017
- Succeeded by: National Super Alliance
- Newspaper: The Kenyan Weekly
- Ideology: Social democracy
- Political position: Centre-left
- Colours
- Slogan: Tuko Tayari ('We Are Ready')
- National Assembly: 146 / 349
- Senate: 29 / 67
- Governors: 30 / 47
- Members of County Assemblies: 1,487 / 2,526

Party flag
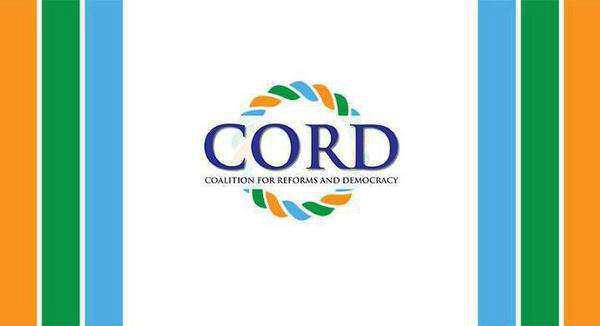

The Coalition for Reforms and Democracy (CORD) was a coalition of multiple political parties, built around the triumvirate of Raila Odinga, Kalonzo Musyoka, and Moses Wetangula, to contest the 2013 Kenyan general election. The members of the coalition are the Orange Democratic Movement, the Wiper Democratic Movement, FORD–Kenya, Kenya Social Congress, KADU–Asili, the Peoples Democratic Party, the Mkenya Solidarity Movement, Chama Cha Uzalendo, the Muungano Party, the United Democratic Movement, Chama Cha Mwananchi, and the Federal Party of Kenya Following the hotly-contested elections that saw the Jubilee Alliance win, CORD filed a petition contesting the results. The Supreme Court rejected CORD's petition and declared the Jubilee candidate Uhuru Kenyatta president-elect.

CORD was the official opposition party in Kenya for the 2013 elections. It had broad support in Kenya with roughly 50% of the electorate.

The coalition was dissolved in the period leading up to the 2017 elections as part of the creation of the National Super Alliance.
