= Uduak Amimo =

Journalist of Kenyan origin

- Uduak
- Citizenship: Kenya
- Education: United States International University- Africa; Nairobi, Kenya; American University; Washington DC, United States; Steinbeis University; Berlin, Germany
- Notable work: Presenter, BBC World Service (2002-2011). Current affairs talk show host, Cheche, Citizen TV (2012-2017). Presidential debate moderator, Kenya's first presidential debate (2013 general election).

Uduak Amimo is a journalist of Kenyan origin. She hosted the current affairs talk show, Cheche, on Citizen TV, which is part of the Royal Media Services stable between 2012 and 2017. Before returning to Kenya, Amimo worked for several international media organisations, including the BBC World Service, Voice of America and Reuters. She was one of the moderators of Kenya's first presidential debates, held during the 2013 general election.

Amimo belongs to the Responsible Leaders Network of the BMW Foundation; she is a Media Fellow of the African Leadership Initiative, part of the Aspen Global Leadership Network; she is a Boehm Media Fellow, a Tutu Fellow and a GSIH Fellow. She took a break from her talk show and the media in 2017, she has said, to pursue her interest in coaching and social impact projects. She is the founder of a community-based organisation, Ramani Life Group, which offers career guidance to students in under-resourced secondary schools in Kenya. She also runs a mentoring and coaching program for young professionals in communication-affiliated industries.

== Education ==
Amimo begun her primary education at Lavington Primary School in Nairobi before spending three years at Roosevelt Elementary School in Iowa in the United States. She then returned to St George's Primary School in Nairobi before moving to the Navy Primary and Secondary schools in Nigeria. She completed her secondary education in Kenya at the Bunyore Girls High School, where she was a prefect.

Amimo holds a Bachelor of Arts (Honours) in International Relations from the United States International University in Nairobi, Kenya. She was part of the team that launched the university's newspaper and soon became its editor.

She also holds a Master of Arts in Journalism and Public Policy from the American University in Washington, D.C., which she received after winning a scholarship and teaching assistantship.

== Career ==
Amimo says she became a journalist to address what she felt was the negative portrayal of Africa, particularly in the international media. Her first job was as an Assistant Producer with Reuters Television in Kenya, where she had interned in her senior year of university. She left Reuters to pursue her MA. After completing her studies, she joined the Voice of America in Washington as a radio and television host, reporter and producer in the English to Africa service.

=== BBC ===
She joined the BBC in 2002, as a producer and presenter with the English-language BBC African news and current affairs programmes, Network Africa and Focus on Africa Amimo presented, produced and edited radio programmes for the African News and Current Affairs section of the BBC World Service before becoming a Senior Producer and Presenter of the BBC African flagship programme, Focus on Africa. In 2006, Amimo was appointed Senior Editorial Adviser, supporting the Director of the BBC World Service, Nigel Chapman. She moved to Ethiopia in 2009 to become the BBC correspondent in Addis Ababa, covering both the country and the African Union. She has reported from several other African countries.

She left the BBC and returned to Kenya in 2011. She took up her position at Royal Media Services in 2012.

== Personal life ==
Amimo is a Christian. Her parents are from Kenya and Nigeria.Uduak, her Nigerian name means God's will in her father's language. Her second name Amimo is a Kenyan name. She is named after her great-grandmother on her mother's side of the family from western Kenya. She is a first-born.
