= Linus Kaikai =

Kenyan journalist

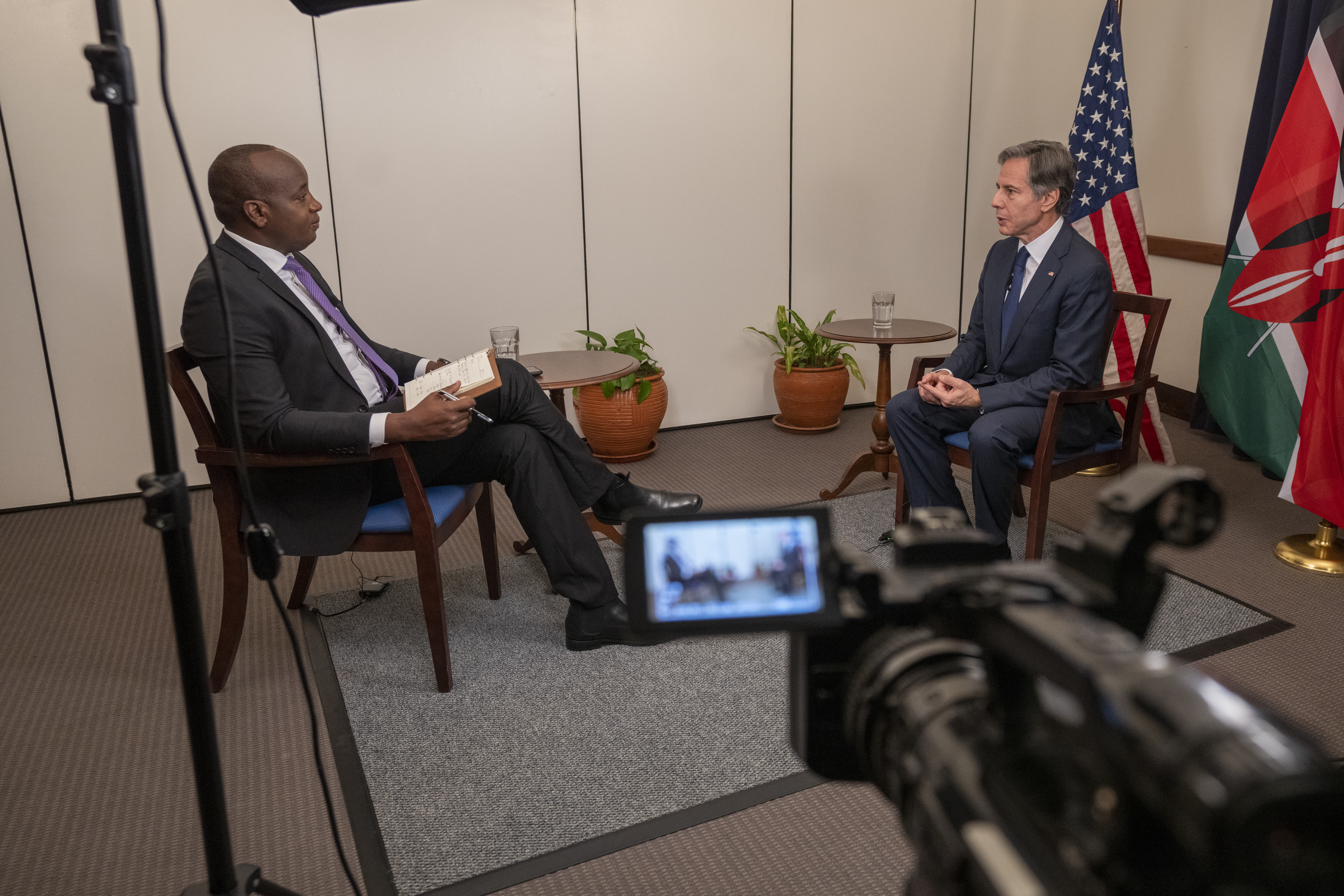
Linus Kaikai in an interview with Secretary Blinken

Linus Kaikai is a Kenyan journalist currently working as Director of Strategy and Innovation of Kenyan Television station Citizen TV and Chairman of the Kenya Editors Guild KEG.

== Education career ==
Kaikai holds a master's degree in International Journalism, from the Masinde Muliro University of Science and Technology. He initially worked for the Kenya Television Network until June 1999. Kaikai then spent 8 years working at the South African Broadcasting Corporation rising through the ranks from correspondent to Bureau Chief. He returned to the Kenya Television Network in 2007 as Managing Editor in charge of Quality and Product Development. He spent two years at KTN before being posted at NTV.

== Awards ==
Kaikai won the 1997 CNN African Television Journalist 1st Prize while working for the Kenya Television Network (KTN). He scooped the Environmental Journalist of the Year Award the following year.

== Personal life ==
Kaikai is married to Jacinta Mueni, a group production manager at Ogilvy, Kenya.
