= Maendeleo Democratic Party =

Political party in Kenya

The Maendeleo Democratic Party (MDP) is a political party in Kenya.

== History ==
The MDP was established in 2007. In the 2013 elections the party nominated eight candidates for the National Assembly. It received 0.3% of the vote, winning a single seat, Moses Malulu Injendi in Malava.
