= Unity Party of Kenya =

Political party in Kenya

- Founded: 2011
- Headquarters: Nyaku House

The Unity Party of Kenya (UPK) is a political party of Kenya. It was formed in 2011 and was among 59 officially registered under the Political Parties Act in 2011 and 2012. It sponsored 11 governmental seats in the 2013 elections.
