= Machel Waikenda =

Kenyan politician (born 1981)

Dr. Machel Waikenda

Director of Political and Intergovernmental Affairs, State House Kenya
- Incumbent
- Assumed office 5 May 2019
- Preceded by: Joshua Kutuny, Mp.

County Executive Committee Member, Kiambu County
- In office 4 Jan 2014 – 4 Aug 2017
- Preceded by: Kiambu Municipal Executives
- Succeeded by: None

Director of Communications, The National Alliance
- In office April 2012 – 16 Dec 2013
- Preceded by: New Party
- Succeeded by: None

Executive Director, The National Alliance
- In office 8 January 2012 – April 2012
- Preceded by: New Position
- Succeeded by: Winnie Guchu

Personal details
- Born: Machel Waikenda; 23 April 1981 (age 45) Kiambu County
- Party: United Democratic Alliance (Kenya)
- Education: University of Florida (Bsc); University of Nairobi (LLB); University of Phoenix (MBA)
- Occupation: Politician
- Website: www.waikenda.org

Dr. Machel Waikenda (/məˈʃɛl waɪˈkɛndə/ mə-SHEL wy-KEN-də; born 23 April 1981) is a Kenyan politician and the former State House Director of Political Affairs. He was formerly the executive-committee member in charge of youth affairs, sports, and communications in the county government of Kiambu. Between April 2012 and August 2013, Waikenda was the communications director for The National Alliance, which through a merger with 13 other mainstream parties formed the Jubilee Party that brought the then sitting president Uhuru Kenyatta to his reelection in 2017.

== Education and early life ==
Machel Waikenda was born on 23 April 1981 in Kiambu County and was named 'Machel' in honor of Samora Machel, the former president of Mozambique. His father, a banker, worked in Central Bank of Kenya and his mother in the civil service.

Waikenda grew up in different towns in Kenya. He spent much of his time in Taita Taveta, Kilifi, and Kaloleni. He completed the last year of his primary school education in Nairobi and sat for his KCPE at St. Mary's School. Thereafter, he went to Makini School where he completed his secondary education.

After graduating from high school, he attended the Santa Fe Community College in Gainesville, Florida where he received his Associate of Arts Degree. Thereafter, he Joined the University of Florida for his bachelor's degree in Science in Electrical Engineering.

Thereafter, Waikenda enrolled in Flight School, Airline Pilot Training in Florida where he received his Commercial Pilots License and a Multi-Engine Rating. While training as a pilot, he enrolled in the University of Phoenix where he graduated with a Master of Business Administration (MBA) degree. He later pursued his PhD in Business Administration in Finance and Entrepreneurship at the United States International University (USIU) Africa and graduated in 2019.

== Career ==
=== First Officer Pilot ===
Waikenda began his career as a pilot trainee in Kenya airways in 2005 and was promoted to the rank of the First Officer (also referred to as the co-pilot) six months later. He holds a commercial pilot licence (CPL) with ratings for the 737 and 767 planes and over 3,000 flight hours. He was formerly an employee at Kenya Airways before he quit his career to focus on other business ventures, especially in the entertainment industry.

== Politics ==
According to sources, Waikenda joined The National Alliance in April 2012 and was the Chief Coordinator for the 2012 By-Elections in Kangema, Ndhiwa, and Kajiado North. He was the acting executive director of the Party, Director of Communications, and the Secretary of Arts and Entertainment where he coordinated media and communications affairs. After the party won the presidential and general elections in March 2013, he was appointed to the National Olympics Committee Youth Commission.

During his political career, Waikenda has served as a member of the World Youth Parliament and the New Partnership for African Development (NEPAD), an economic development program aimed to provide an overarching vision and policy framework for bolstering economic co-operation and integration among African countries.

Waikenda's published articles primarily revolve around youth unemployment, abstinence from premarital sex, drugs, alcohol and substance abuse, avoidance of crime, and the role of youth in revolutionizing politics and governance. With an estimated youth population of about 10 million, which account for more than 20 per cent of the total population, Kenya is somewhat on the verge of facing what is described as 'youth bulge.' While this situation seems to be a vital asset to the growth of national economy, it has also predisposed the country to a national crises. A majority of youth population has not been able to access employment, particularly in Kiambu County. To address this issue, the government has established a range of platforms to empower the youth. During his tenure, Waikenda strove to enhance the youth's access to funding from various government assistance programs such as the Kiambu Biashara Fund.

In 2013, Waikenda initiated a nationwide program dubbed "Dunda" that was used by the Jubilee Coalition to agitate for support from the youth. The campaign, which involved local artistes such Jaguar, Bamboo, Abbas, Chiwawa, Ally B, G con, and Ben Githae, was meant to inform the youth about their pivotal role in politics and civic rights as well as giving them an opportunity to highlight their issues to political aspirants, especially those allied to the Jubilee Party. Through the extensive media coverage during the campaigns, Waikenda called the government to formulate a framework that would pave the way for the allocation of 2.5 per cent of the country's annual GDP to the Youth Enterprise Capital Fund, a program that would enable the youth to access interest-free business financing. In hindsight, the government-elect announced that it would allocate 30 percent of its procurement tenders to young entrepreneurs.

=== Initiatives ===
Waikenda has been at the forefront of initiating several projects that have primarily revolved around youth affairs. Some of them include the following:

==== Kiambu Iko Talent Competitions ====
During his tenure as the County Executive Member of Youth Affairs, Sports and Communication, Waikenda promoted youth talents through various initiatives such as 'Kiambu Iko Talent Competitions' where the most creative and best performing young people with arts talents were rewarded. He also introduced a football tournament dubbed 'Champions Cup' where he awarded cash prizes to the teams that were crowned the County Champions after a fierce competition from the ward level.

==== Biashara Fund Mobile Loans ====
Through his guidance the Kiambu Youth, Women and Persons with Disabilities Enterprise Development Fund Act (dubbed Biashara Fund) was implemented with continuous disbursements done and repayment of almost all beneficiaries. The principal goal of the fund was to enable youth, women and persons with disability to access affordable funding for their business, whether start-ups or existing entities. He has expanded the knowledge of youth through conducting capacity building training on various aspects of agri-business, leadership, business management, youth access to government procurement and talent development.
