= Party of National Unity (Kenya) =

- Chairman: Eng David Kamau
- Secretary-General: John Okemwa Anunda
- Vice-Chairman: Paul Rukaria
- Organising Secretary: John Kamama
- Founder: Mwai Kibaki
- Founded: September 2007
- Ideology: Conservatism
- Political position: Right-wing
- Slogan: Kazi iendelee

Website
- pnu.co.ke

The Party of National Unity (PNU) is a political party in Kenya originally founded as a political coalition. On 16 September 2007, Kenyan President Mwai Kibaki announced the party's formation and declared that he would run as its presidential candidate in the December 2007 Kenyan elections. Following the conditions set by the Political Parties Act which were passed in Kenya in 2008, PNU became an official political party. Recently PNU has launched activities to revamp itself ahead of the 2022 general elections.

== Overview ==
The Party of National Unity started as a coalition of several parties, including KANU, Narc-Kenya, Ford-Kenya, Ford-People, Democratic Party, Shirikisho, National Alliance Party of Kenya and others. President Mwai Kibaki was the only individual member of PNU, besides the corporate membership through the affiliated parties. The party was created shortly before the elections that were held in December 2007. Until the beginning of September it was not clear on which party's ticket the president was going to run. In the 2002 elections, Kibaki ran as the candidate of the National Rainbow Coalition (NARC), which had since split. The erstwhile original NARC was legally in the hands of its chairperson Charity Ngilu who showed no inclination of siding with Kibaki for a renewed bid. Kibaki's allies had already pulled out of NARC and founded NARC-Kenya which was not on good terms with a number of important politicians in Kibaki's government of national unity which had seen the intake of erstwhile opposition figures since 2005 who held on to their parties like KANU or Ford-Kenya.

== 2007 elections ==
The poor political preparation of the new party became apparent during the process of nominations for parliamentary seats. Initially, PNU member parties agreed to field parliamentary and civic candidates under PNU, except KANU, which was permitted to field its own candidates. However, this agreement failed to materialise. As a result, some candidates, mainly from Kibaki's former Democratic Party, contested under the PNU ticket and others under their respective parties. In a number of constituencies, PNU-affiliated candidates were contesting against each other for the same parliamentary seat. The PNU fared poorly in the parliamentary elections of 2007, reaching only 43 seats against nearly 99 for its main rival, the Orange Democratic Movement (ODM). Together with affiliated parties, however, it could command around 78 members of parliament.

On 28 February 2008 through a mediation team headed by former UN General Secretary Kofi Annan, the PNU government reached a deal with the ODM and leader Raila Odinga to share power. The power sharing deal was the first one of its kind in Africa.

== 2008 onwards ==
After the 2007 elections, PNU was registered as an independent political party. George Saitoti served as chairman until his death in 2012, while Mwai Kibaki was party leader until his retirement from politics, much to the dismay of several of its coalition partners. In October 2012, the party's National Executive Committee entered a tentative election pact with TNA, where it would surrender the right to field individual candidates in the 2013 in exchange for supporting Uhuru Kenyatta's presidential bid.

The party national executive committee in June 2021 made a resolution that the party will field a presidential candidate in the 2022 general election alongside candidates for all other elective positions indicating that the party is busy preparing to retake the reins of power in 2022.

== Structures ==
Initially, in 2007, the party membership consisted of Mwai Kibaki as the sole individual member, with all other parties within the coalition having corporate membership. However, in mid-2008 the party embarked on a membership drive and grassroots elections to create structures to function as a political party in its own right. Though an attempt to get the affiliate political parties to merge into PNU failed.

The party leadership structure consists of a Party Leader, National chairman, Secretary-General, and county chairpersons.

== Constitution of Kenya 2021 Amendment Process (BBI) ==
At a national delegates conference held on 19 December 2020, PNU endorsed the Building Bridges Initiative (BBI) report and promised to rally the public behind it. The Party has since then organized forums across the country to educate the public about details contained in the Building Bridges Initiative (BBI) report.
