= Grand National Union of Kenya =

The Grand National Union was a political party in Kenya.

== History ==
The party was established by former Member of Parliament for Laikipia East Constituency, Mwangi Kiunjuri. It was formally registered on 8 March 2012. During the 2013 Kenyan general election, it fared rather poorly, winning only a number of County Assembly seats in and around Central Kenya.

In 2016, the party merged into the Jubilee Party.
