= United Democratic Movement (Kenya) =

Political party in Kenya

- Abbreviation: UDM
- Leader: Ali Ibrahim Roba
- Chairman: Bashir Maalim Madey
- Secretary-General: Ramadhan Bungale
- Organising secretary general: Paul R. Cheboi
- Founded: 1999
- Split from: KANU
- Headquarters: Nairobi, Kenya
- Colors: yellow, red
- National Assembly: 7 / 349
- Senate: 2 / 67

Website
- udmkenya.com

The United Democratic Movement (UDM) is a political party that was founded in 1999 by politicians who were at the time considered to be renegades from the then ruling party Kenya African National Union but was denied registration by the then head of state Daniel Toroitich Arap Moi and most of its then leaders went to other parties by the time of the 2002 general elections.

== 2007 General Elections ==
UDM allied itself with the Orange Democratic Movement in supporting Raila Odinga's candidacy for the office of President of Kenya, and fielded several candidates in the parliamentary elections. Its most prominent member of that parliament was Hellen Sambili who served as Minister of East African Cooperation in Kenya's grand coalition government. The party was briefly subject to a leadership struggle as a faction of 'rebel' ODM Members of Parliament, allied to William Ruto attempted to take control of the party to use it as their platform for the 2012 elections. However, following resistance from the existing leadership Ruto and his allies opted to form the United Republican Party. in December 2012, the party was part of a short lived four party coalition, including the National Vision Party, New Ford Kenya and Kenya African National Union to field a single presidential candidate at the 2013 general elections, before finally settling on becoming part of the Coalition for Reforms and Democracy

== Kenyan general election, 2017 ==
In 2016, Kenya's former Director of Public Prosecutions Philip Murgor was unveiled as the United Democratic Movement (Kenya) presidential candidate in Nairobi for the August 2017 General Election.

== 2022 ==
On 10 March 2022, the UDM endorsed ODM chief Odinga for resident in the 2022 general elections. On 18 August 2022, the UDM ditched Odinga in favor of the president-elect, Dr. William Ruto. That meant that the United Democratic Alliance had a majority in the Senate, National Assembly, and the Council of governors.
