= The Independent Party =

Defunct political party in Kenya

The Independent Party (TIP) was a political party in Kenya.

== History ==
The party nominated 35 National Assembly candidates for the 2007 general elections, receiving 0.5% of the vote and failing to win a seat.

In the 2013 elections the TIP nominated 28 candidates; it saw its vote share increase to 1.1%, winning one seat; Maweu Kyengo Katatha in Kangundo.

In 2016 the party merged into the Jubilee Party.
