= National Party of Kenya =

Political party in Kenya

The National Party of Kenya is a political party in Kenya. In the legislative elections of 27 December 2002, the party was a partner in the National Rainbow Coalition that won 56.1% of the popular vote and 125 out of 212 elected seats. The party itself took six of these seats. In the presidential elections of the same day, the party supported Mwai Kibaki, who won 62.2% and was elected.

The party was founded in 1992. Its chairperson was Charity Ngilu.
