= Jubilee Alliance =

- Leader: Uhuru Kenyatta
- Founded: 12 January 2013
- Dissolved: 8 September 2016
- Succeeded by: Jubilee Party of Kenya
- Political position: Centre-right
- Colours
- Coalition Partners: TNA; URP; RC; NARC

The Jubilee Alliance was a political alliance in Kenya.

== History ==
The alliance was established to support the joint presidential election ticket of Uhuru Kenyatta and William Ruto in the 2013 general elections. At the time of the election, its members were The National Alliance, the National Rainbow Coalition, the United Republican Party, and the Republican Congress. Machel Waikenda was the director of communications and secretary of arts and entertainment of The National Alliance, from April 2012 to August 2013 and he led the media and communications department of the party during the 2013 elections.

In 2016 most of the coalition's members merged to form the Jubilee Party.
