= People's Liberation Party (Kenya) =

Political party in Kenya

- Leader: Martha Karua
- Secretary General: Asha Bashir
- Vice chairman: Kabala Kile
- Treasurer: Fatuma Abbas
- Founded: 2005
- Headquarters: Nairobi Liberation House, Woodlands Road, off Lenana Road
- Colours
- Slogan: Unite - Liberate

Website
- plpkenya.com

The People's Liberation Party (PLP), previously known as the National Rainbow Coalition–Kenya (NARC–Kenya) until February 2025, is a political party in Kenya.

== History ==
The party was formed after the defeat of the government-sponsored draft constitution. It was formed by National Rainbow Coalition members loyal to the government. The party, though months old, captured 3 parliamentary seats (Nakuru Town, Saku and North Horr) and 2 Civic seats in the by-elections of 24 July 2006 that was seen as a litmus test for the upcoming general elections for which the new party was planned to play a major role in securing reelection for president Mwai Kibaki.

History as National Rainbow Coalition – Kenya
- Leader: Martha Wangari Karua
- President: Martha Wangari Karua
- Chairman: Martha Wangari Karua
- Secretary-General: Asha Bashir
- Founded: 2005
- Split from: National Rainbow Coalition
- Succeeded by: People's Liberation Party
- Headquarters: Woodland Road, off Lenana Road, Nairobi
- Colours: Black; Red; White; Green
- Slogan: One Kenya, One nation, One people

Election symbol
- 🌹

Website
- web.archive.org/web/20130501063540/http://www.narckenya.org

== Electoral performance ==
=== By-elections ===
During the by-elections of 24 June 2006, the party won three out of the five parliamentary posts up for grabs. Its candidates William Kariuki, Hussein Sasura and Ukur Yattani Kanacho won the Constituencies of Nakuru Town, Saku and North Horr. In 2025, Chama Cha Kazi's (Swahili for Party of/for Work) Member of County Assembly Duncan Mbui resigned his Evurore ward seat in hopes of winning the Mbeere North Constituency parliamentary by-election which he lost. A by-election was scheduled for and held on 26 February 2026 for Evurore ward, with Martha Karua endorsing PLP's Joseph Nyaga Njeru who lost to United Democratic Alliance's Duncan Muratia.

== Before the 2007 elections ==
Incumbent president Mwai Kibaki was expected to receive the party's nomination for another 5-year term. The party, however, never took off. Important figures around Kibaki were hesitant to join. Thus a few months before the 2007 election, a new coalition by the name of Party of National Unity (PNU) was formed of which NARC-Kenya became a part. The party decided, however, to field a number of candidates under its own flag, thus contributing to the overall poor results for PNU in the parliamentary elections where parties affiliated to PNU competed against each other.

== 2007 elections ==
At the Kenyan general election, 2007, Narc-Kenya managed to enter three candidates into parliament.

== Post 2008 ==
In late 2008 PNU opted to register as a political party in its own right, to the opposition of several coalition parties including NARC-Kenya. Narc-Kenya opted to continue registering members in its own right electing Martha Karua as party leader in November 2008. Narc Kenya gained the distinction of being the first political party to apply for registration under the new political parties act passed as part of implementing Kenya's new constitution.

== Rebrand from NARC–Kenya ==
In February 2025, the National Rainbow Coalition–Kenya officially rebranded to the People's Liberation Party (PLP). The new slogan is "Unite - Liberate". Party leader, Martha Karua argued that Narc-Kenya had become less familiar to younger people and that its rebrand aimed at reinvigorating its appeal. The PLP focuses on unity, transparency, and accountability.
