= National Vision Party =

Political party in Kenya

- Leader: Eng. Anthony Chelimo
- Founder: Nicholas Biwott
- Founded: 2008
- Headquarters: VISION PLAZA
- National affiliation: Pambazuko Alliance
- Slogan: POA

The National Vision Party of Kenya is a political party founded, by former cabinet Minister Nicholas Biwott in 2008, in the fall out of his failed attempts to seize control of former ruling party the Kenya African National Union from Uhuru Kenyatta. In December 2012, the party entered a four party coalition including the New Ford Kenya, United Democratic Movement and Kenya African National Union to field a single presidential candidate at the 2013 general elections.
