= Forum for the Restoration of Democracy – Kenya =

Political party

Forum for the Restoration of Democracy–Kenya
- Abbreviation: FORD–Kenya
- Leader: Moses Wetangula
- Chairperson: Joel Amuma Ruhu
- Secretary-General: John Chikati
- Founder: George Kinuthia
- Founded: 1991
- Split from: FORD
- Headquarters: Riverside Drive, Nairobi
- Ideology: Social democracy
- Political position: Centre-left
- National affiliation: Kenya Kwanza
- Colours: Black, white and green
- National Assembly: 5 / 349
- Senate: 1 / 67
- Governors: 1 / 47

Website
- www.fordkenya.party

Forum for the Restoration of Democracy–Kenya (FORD–Kenya) is a Kenyan political party. The party has sat in the government of Kenya once, under the National Rainbow Coalition, from 2003 to 2007, having ended forty years of one party (Kenya African National Union) rule. In April 2022, the party joined the Kenya Kwanza coalition for the August 2022 elections, and is headed by Moses Wetangula, the current speaker of the National Assembly of Kenya. The party tends to be more popular among the Luhya people.

== History ==
The history of FORD–Kenya is essentially the history of multi-party politics in Kenya. Kenya was a one-party state until December 1991, when a special conference of the ruling Kenya African National Union (KANU) agreed to introduce a multiparty political system. An umbrella political grouping, the Forum for the Restoration of Democracy (FORD), had been formed in August 1991 by six opposition leaders to fight for change in the country. The six were Jaramogi Oginga Odinga, Phillip Gachoka, Ahmed Bamahariz, Salim Ndamwe, Masinde Muliro and George Nthenge. But President Daniel arap Moi had outlawed it, its leaders were under constant surveillance by security agents, and their meetings outlawed. Intimidation only eased after sustained pressure from the United Kingdom, the United States, and Scandinavian countries.

In August 1992, due to an internal power struggle over the leadership of FORD, the party split into two factions: FORD–Asili (led by Kenneth Matiba) and FORD–Kenya (led by Oginga Odinga). FORD–Kenya performed poorly in the general elections of 1992, coming a distant third behind KANU and FORD–Asili. The reelection of President Moi and KANU, both deeply unpopular, owed much to the division of the original FORD.

Odinga died in January 1994 and was succeeded as chairman of FORD–Kenya by Michael Wamalwa Kijana. At the time, FORD–Kenya's leadership included some of the top opposition leaders in Kenya, including lawyer James Orengo, economist Professor Peter Anyang' Nyong'o, Raila Odinga (the son of Oginga Odinga), Oburu Odinga (Raila's elder brother), environmentalist, and, later on, Nobel laureate, Wangari Maathai, and many others. But the party was headed for yet another split. Michael Wamalwa and Raila Odinga tussled over the leadership of FORD–Kenya for 2 years. In 1997, Wamalwa beat Odinga in free and fair party elections, precipitating a devastating tribal split that the party has yet to recover from. Raila, with a sizeable number of Luo MP's, left FORD–Kenya to join the National Development Party of Kenya (NDP). In the 1997 general elections, FORD–Kenya finished fourth, behind Raila's NDP.

== General elections ==
=== 2002 General elections ===
Kenya's opposition political parties finally put their differences behind them in the run-up to the 2002 general elections, fielding one candidate, Mwai Kibaki, for the presidency. Kibaki defeated the KANU candidate, Uhuru Kenyatta, and formed a government of national unity. He appointed FORD–Kenya's leader, Michael Wamalwa, to be vice president and gave a number of cabinet positions to FORD–Kenya MPs.

In December 2012 it was one of four parties to enter into Coalition for Reforms and Democracy, alongside Raila Odinga's Orange Democratic Movement and Kalonzo Musyoka's Wiper Democratic Movement – Kenya. In 2013, CORD coalition emerged second in the presidential elections and therefore, formed the opposition. FORD–Kenya party leader Hon. Moses Wetangula, who was one of the CORD co-principals, was elected the Senate Minority Leader. He will hold the position until 20th March 2018 when he was replaced by Siaya Senator Hon. James Orengo.The Bungoma High Court nullified his election on 30 September 2013 and the Speaker of the Senate declared the seat vacant on 16 October 2013. In a by-election held on 19 December 2013, FORD–Kenya candidate Moses Wetangula recaptured his Bungoma senatorial seat with a landslide win after garnering 149,458 votes against his main contender Musikari Kombo, who got about a half of the votes.

In 2017, FORD–Kenya party joined other parties to form the NASA coalition. Musalia Mudavadi, Moses Wetangula, Kalonzo Musyoka, Charity Ngilu, Isaac Ruto and Raila Odinga became principals of the coalition.

The NASA coalition fielded ODM's Raila Odinga as its presidential candidate with Wiper's Kalonzo Musyoka deputising him. FORD–Kenya party leader Moses Wetangula was promised the Deputy Prime Cabinet Secretary slot in the event of the coalition's victory. NASA went on to finish second in the election that was nullified eventually by the Supreme Court of Kenya. It boycotted the subsequent election.

Once again, FORD–Kenya party leader was given the minority leader slot in the Senate of Kenya, a position he held for just 6 months before he was replaced by Hon. James Orengo.

In 2022, FORD–Kenya, UDA and ANC parties formed a Kenya Kwanza coalition. FORD–Kenya party leader Hon. Moses Wetangula became one of the co-principals of the coalition. Kenya Kwanza coalition went on to win the presidential race, in the victory that was challenged by the opposition unsuccessfully at the Supreme Court of Kenya. The coalition formed government with FORD–Kenya producing the Cabinet Secretary for Health, Dr. Susan Nakhumicha Wafula, in the cabinet.

FORD–Kenya's party leader Hon. Moses Wetangula resigned as the Bungoma senator and was elected the speaker of the National Assembly. Other FORD–Kenya members were appointed in several government positions, notably; PS Dr. Juma Mukhwana, CAS Hon. Vincent Kemosi, CAS Hon. Sudi Wandabusi, CAS Hon. Chris Wamalwa, Director Dr. Joseph Wafula Dabodabo, Director Millicent Abudho, Director Elizabeth Iminza, Director Ruth Wanyonyi and many others. FORD Kenya party fielded a candidate in the Bungoma Senatorial by-election afterwards. The candidate, Hon. Wafula Wakoli, won against the UDA candidate with a landslide, becoming the second senator of Bungoma since the inception of devolution.

On 15 March 2023, FORD–Kenya top management organs, the Management Committee/NEC/PG held a special meeting at Maanzoni Lodge in Machakos to fill in vacant positions that had been left vacant due to numerous government appointments. The Secretary General position was up for grab and several party members showed interests of vying but only two applied, Hon. John Murumba Chikati and Wafula Omar Mutacho.

Following exhausting deliberations at the Management Committee, Hon. Dr. John Murumba Chikati was endorsed, unanimously as the Secretary General of the FORD Kenya party. He took over from Dr. Chris Wamalwa Wakhungu who resigned to join the civil service. Other leaders were elected including the Bungoma Governor H.E Kenneth Makelo Lusaka as the 1st Deputy Party Leader. NEC ratified the decision.

== Change of leadership ==
Michael Wamalwa Kijana died in London on 23 August 2003 after a long illness. After the funeral, FORD–Kenya elected Musikari Kombo to succeed Wamalwa, beating another FORD–Kenya MP, Dr. Mukhisa Kituyi, in the contest. With neither the charisma of Michael Wamalwa nor the crowd-pulling popularity of Raila Odinga, Kombo struggled to establish the party as an influential component of the ruling coalition. The party felt shortchanged after the death of Wamalwa, when the prized position of vice president was handed to the LDP's Moody Awori and a number of other appointments went the way of other parties. Kombo showed his mantle as the FORD–Kenya Chairman when he led his party MPs in rejecting their appointment to the newly reconstituted cabinet after the constitutional referendum of 2005. This forced President Mwai Kibaki to take Kombo and FORD–Kenya seriously and increase the number of FORD–Kenya cabinet ministers to 6 from 3 and acquire other senior civil service appointments for its party members.

In March 2007, a breakaway party known as New Ford Kenya was registered by cabinet minister Soita Shitanda. Kituyi later joined the party. At the Kenyan general election, 2007, FORD–Kenya aligned with the newly created Party of National Unity led by President Kibaki. It ran, however, its own candidates in a number of constituencies and local authorities. The election results were very poor as with a quarter of constituencies not yet decided had FORD–Kenya holding only one seat. Kombo's tenure ended with the party suffering through numerous court cases trying to get a new leader. Eventually, Moses Wetangula became the leader of the party through a national delegates congress election.

In 2020, a faction led by the Secretary General Dr. Eseli Simiyu attempted to change the leadership of the party by calling a special NEC meeting at Radisson Blu Hotel in Nairobi. They installed Wafula Wamunyinyi as the party leader but the Political Party Disputes Resolution Tribunal quashed the changes. The party's Deputy Secretary General Millicent Abudho immediately called for a Management Committee Meeting which suspended Dr. Eseli Simiyu as the SG of the party and installed her in an acting capacity. The matter went to court. In 2021, the party held the NDC and elected new leadership, with Dr. Chris Wamalwa getting elected as the Secretary General. Moses Wetangula was reelected as the party leader unopposed. In April 2023, the party elected Dr. John Chikati as its Secretary General following the appointment of his predecessor as the Chief Administrative Secretary.

== Governing body ==
As gazetted on 30 November 2021, the Registrar of Political Parties in Kenya gave notice that FORD–Kenya made changes to its governing body.

Designation	Current Official
Party Leader	Moses M. Wetangula
1st Deputy Party Leader	Kenneth Makelo Lusaka
2nd Deputy Party Leader	Millicent Abudho
2nd Deputy Party Leader	Ferdinand Wanyonyi
National Chairperson	Joel Amuma Ruhu
1st Vice-Chairperson	Margaret Sabina Wanjala
2nd Vice-Chairperson	Henry ole Ndiema
Secretary-General	John Chikati
1st Deputy Secretary-General	Elizabeth Iminza
2nd Deputy Secretary-General	Yassir Bajaber Sheikh
National Treasurer	Nasri Ibrahim Salal
1st Deputy National Treasurer	Joyce Cheruto
2nd Deputy National Treasurer	John Kennedy Wanyama
National Organizing Secretary	Chris Mandu Mandu
1st Deputy Organizing Secretary	
2nd Deputy Organizing Secretary	David Burare
Director of Elections	Khadija Mustafa
1st Deputy Director of Elections	Emmanuel Osore
2nd Deputy Director of Elections	Christine Nzuki
Secretary for Labour, Administration and Public Services	Ann Walubengo
Deputy Secretary for Labour, Administration and Public Services	Wilbroda Shinanda
Secretary for Education	Catherine Wambiliyanga
Deputy Secretary for Education	Eng. James Ratemo
Secretary for Agriculture, Livestock and Fisheries	George Kopala
Deputy Secretary for Agriculture, Livestock and Fisheries	John Hereng
Secretary for Health Services	Kibunguch Enock (Dr.)
Deputy Secretary for Health Services	Abigael N. Matini
Secretary for Finance and Economic Services	Cleophus Ngeti
Deputy Secretary for Finance and Economic Services	Tondoo Chrispus
Secretary for Water, Environment and Natural Resources	Jane Nampaso
Deputy Secretary for Water, Environment and Natural Resources	Lucy Nagholo
Secretary for Trade, Tourism, Co-operatives and Enterprise Development	Bernard Baraza
Deputy Secretary for Trade, Tourism, Cooperatives and Enterprise Development	Hadad Fesal Almas
Secretary for Lands and Infrastructural Development	James Arimonyang
Deputy Secretary for Lands and Infrastructural Development	Bishop James Muiru Karemi
Secretary for Constitutional and Legal Affairs	John Makali
1st Deputy Secretary for Constitutional And Legal Affairs	Reuben Miida Riech
2nd Secretary for Constitutional and Legal Affairs	Linda Mukhanya
Secretary for Gender, Youth Affairs and Sports	Luke Opwora
Deputy Secretary for Gender, Youth Affairs and Sports	Kamila Mathew Salat
Secretary for Information, Communication, Technology and Research Development	Ismael Arare
Deputy Secretary for Information, Communication, Technology and Research Development	Roselida Adambi
Secretary for Devolution and County Co-ordination	Zaddock Mbeya
Deputy Secretary for Devolution and County Co-ordination	Major (Rtd) Mutacho Omar
Parliamentary Chief Whip	Wafula Wakoli
Professionals League Chairperson	Benson W. Milimo
Women League President	Pauline Nakila
Youth League President	Moses Wafula Chekai
Seniors League Chairperson	Gitu Wa Kahengeri
Persons with Disabilities League Chairperson	Pepela Wanyonyi
