= The National Alliance =

Political party in Kenya

- Founder: Lawrence Nginyo Kariuki
- Founded: 3 July 2000
- Dissolved: 7 September 2016
- Merged into: Jubilee Party
- Ideology: Kenyan nationalism Conservatism
- Political position: Centre-right to right-wing
- National affiliation: NARC (2002); PNU (2007); Jubilee Alliance (2013)
- Slogan: I Believe!

The National Alliance (TNA) was a political party in Kenya. It took on its current identity when Uhuru Kenyatta assumed control and renamed it as the vehicle for his 2012 presidential campaign.

== History ==
The National Alliance was founded as the National Alliance Party of Kenya on 3 July 2000. The leaders of the communities represented at the inaugural meeting subsequently approached Lawrence Nginyo Kariuki, a prominent businessman and politician to be the founding chairman of the Alliance and Kariuki consented.

=== 2002 elections ===
Prior to the 2002 general elections, the party joined the National Rainbow Coalition (NARC) alliance. NARC nominated Mwai Kibaki as its presidential candidate. Kibaki won the presidential elections, with NARC also winning a majority of seats in the National Assembly, with the National Alliance Party taking six of the coalition's 125 seats.

=== 2007 elections ===
On 13 September 2007 the NAK joined Mwai Kibaki and other political parties in the formation of the Party of National Unity (PNU). PNU fared poorly in the parliamentary elections 2007 reaching only 43 seats against nearly 99 for its main rival, the Orange Democratic Movement (ODM). Together with affiliated parties, however, it could command around 78 members of parliament. On February 28, 2008 through a mediation team headed by former UN Secretary-General Kofi Annan, the PNU government reached a deal with the ODM to share power. ODM is headed by Oburu Oginga Odinga. The power sharing deal was the first one of its kind in Africa. The National Alliance party of Kenya was re-registered in 2008 under the new Political Parties Act 2007 as an independent party from its previous mother PNU. It functioned for a while under the leadership of the former chairman Nginyo Kariuki.

=== 2013 elections ===
In April 2012 the Party also changed its initials from NAK to NAPK and taken over by forces allied to Uhuru Kenyatta. It immediately began making waves in Kenya's political scene winning the Kangema and Kajiado North by elections as well as several county council wards. The outcome sparked a steady flow of defections from politicians across political parties, hoping to win various seats in Kenya's 2013 general elections. In December 2012 Uhuru Kenyatta, TNA's presumed presidential candidate, William Ruto of the URP and several other prominent politicians signed a pre-election deal outlining how the parties would share seats in a coalition government, later forming the Jubilee Alliance, which supported Kenyatta's bid for the presidency. In the 2013 general elections Kenyatta was elected president and the National Alliance In the parliamentary elections the National Alliance received the most votes but won fewer seats than the ODM.

In 2016 the party merged into the Jubilee Party.
