= United Republican Party (Kenya) =

United Republican Party URP
- Leader: William Ruto
- Chairperson: Francis Ole Kaparo
- Secretary-General: Fred Muteti
- Founder: Charles Keter
- Founded: 15 January 2012
- Dissolved: 8 September 2016
- Merged into: Jubilee Party
- Headquarters: Nairobi
- Ideology: Liberalism
- National affiliation: Jubilee Alliance
- Slogan: Kusema na kutenda

The United Republican Party (URP) was a political party in Kenya.

== History ==
The United Republican Party (URP) was launched by William Ruto on 15 January 2012, in collaboration with several Kenyan politicians who were part of a faction within the Orange Democratic Movement (ODM) opposed to its leader, Raila Odinga. The formation of the party followed a series of meetings held earlier that month, positioning URP as a political vehicle for the upcoming March 2013 general elections.

In December 2012, Ruto and leaders of other political parties entered into a pre-election coalition agreement. Under the deal, Ruto was named the running mate of Uhuru Kenyatta, with URP set to receive an equitable share of government positions in the event of an electoral victory. The party subsequently became a member of the Jubilee Alliance, which nominated Kenyatta as its presidential candidate. In the 2013 elections, Kenyatta was elected president, and URP emerged as the third-largest party in Parliament, securing 12 seats in the Senate and 76 in the National Assembly.

In 2016, URP was formally dissolved by Secretary-General Fred Muteti and William Ruto, as part of a merger into the newly formed Jubilee Party.
