= National Rainbow Coalition =

- Founder: Raila Odinga; Charity Ngilu; Mwai Kibaki; Michael Kijana Wamalwa
- Founded: 2002
- Headquarters: Nairobi, Kenya
- Youth wing: NarcYL
- Women's wing: NarcWL
- Ideology: Social democracy
- National affiliation: Jubilee Alliance (2013)
- Slogan: "Haki Yetu Sasa Inawezekana"

The National Rainbow Coalition (NARC) is a political party in Kenya. As an alliance, it was in power from 2002 and 2005 when it collapsed due to disagreements between members over a constitutional referendum.

== Formation ==
In preparation of the 2002 elections, the National Alliance Party of Kenya (Formerly NAK now NAPK) allied itself with the Liberal Democratic Party (LDP) to form the National Alliance of Rainbow Coalition (NARC). On December 27, 2002, NARC won a landslide victory over KANU. NARC presidential candidate Mwai Kibaki got 62% of the votes in the presidential elections, against only 31% for the KANU candidate, Uhuru Kenyatta. On December 30, 2002, Mwai Kibaki was sworn in as the third President of Kenya.

== NARC government ==
Despite its initial popularity, the NARC-led government has been troublesome. The friction between LDP and those loyal to Kibaki became apparent. After the Kenyan constitutional referendum in 2005, all LDP members were thrown out of the government. Subsequently, LDP became an opposition party, forming the Orange Democratic Movement, a coalition of opposition politicians. Later, NARC members loyal to Kibaki founded a new party, NARC–Kenya. Consequently, the original NARC was left in the hands of its chairperson Charity Ngilu who also served as the minister of health.

== 2007 elections ==
On 5 October 2007,Charity Ngilu announced her support for the Orange Democratic Movement and its presidential candidate, Raila Odinga, in the December 2007 general election;. She initially said that she was remaining in the government, despite backing Kibaki's main rival. However, her dismissal from the government by Kibaki was announced on October 6. While supporting ODM, Ngilu defended her parliamentary seat on NARC ticket. Under Ngilu, NARC won 3 seats in the new Kenyan parliament altogether.

== 2013 elections ==
After briefly running her own campaign, Ngilu initially opted to support Raila Odinga for the presidency in 2013, signing a coalition agreement involving NARC, ODM, Wiper Democratic Movement and FORD–Kenya, before walking out at the last minute to join the Jubilee Alliance.
