= Wiper Patriotic Front =

Kenyan political party

- Abbreviation: WPF
- Leader: Kalonzo Musyoka
- Chairman: Chirau Ali Mwakwere
- Secretary-General: Judith Achieng Sijeny
- Party Leader: Kalonzo Musyoka
- Vice Chairman: Mutula Kilonzo Jnr
- Founder: Kalonzo Musyoka
- Founded: March 2006
- Split from: Orange Democratic Movement
- Headquarters: Wiper House, Karen, Nairobi
- Ideology: Social democracy
- Political position: Centre-left
- National affiliation: CORD (2012–2016); NASA (2017); Azimio la Umoja–One Kenya (2022–present)
- International affiliation: Centrist Democrat International
- Colours: Blue; White; Red
- National Assembly: 25 / 349
- Senate: 3 / 67

Website
- www.wiper.co.ke

The Wiper Patriotic Front (WPF), until 2025 known as the Wiper Democratic Movement–Kenya (WDM), and originally called the Orange Democratic Movement–Kenya (ODM–Kenya), is a political party in Kenya, which originated as a result of the 2005 Kenyan constitutional referendum. The party tends to be more popular among the Kamba people. It is headed by Kalonzo Musyoka, who ran for president in 2007 and served as the vice-president in the Grand Coalition of Mwai Kibaki and Raila Odinga. WPF is now a member of the main opposition Azimio La Umoja coalition.

== 2007 elections ==
The present Wiper Democratic Movement, originally known as ODM-Kenya was created as a result a split between Kalonzo Musyoka and Raila Odinga in mid-August 2007. Raila's group, which also included Musalia Mudavadi, William Ruto, Joseph Nyagah and Najib Balala bought out the original ODM party from Mugambi Imanyara, while Kalonzo's group, consisting of himself and Dr. Julia Ojiambo remained in the shell of the party. The two factions held their elections for presidential candidate on consecutive days at the Kasarani sports complex in Nairobi. On 31 August 2007, Kalonzo Musyoka defeated Julia Ojiambo for the ODM–Kenya ticket. On September 1 Raila Odinga was selected the ODM presidential candidate. Raila and Kalonzo faced president Kibaki in the general election. Kalonzo took a distant third place, but in January 2008 he became vice-president of Kenya under Kibaki, whose victory was disputed by Raila Odinga and the ODM. Following the 2007-2008 Kenyan crisis, which resulted in a great loss of life, a government of national unity was formed between Kibaki's PNU and Odinga's ODM, with Musyoka retaining his position as vice-president. So far, Musyoka is one of two Wiper Democratic Movement politicians in the cabinet, with Mutula Kilonzo as Minister for Justice and Constitutional Affairs, as his faction received very little support in the parliamentary election.

== Political Parties Act ==
Wiper Democratic Movement logo

In December 2008, Wiper Democratic Movement held party elections to comply with the recently passed Political Parties Act.

== 2013 General Elections ==
In mid-2011, the party changed its colours and symbol in order to differentiate itself from Raila Odinga's ODM party and was believed to be a central cog in a proposed political alliance intended to present a unified front against Raila in the 2013 general elections. However, in December 2012, it became one of three political parties to support Odinga's soon-to-be-doomed presidential ambitions. The other parties supporting the failed presidential ambitions were FORD-Kenya and Orange Democratic Movement.

== 2017 General Elections ==
Wiper Democratic Movement entered in a Coalition with ODM, ANC Kenya and Ford Kenya to Form the National Super Alliance in the run up to 2017 presidential elections.

Like in 2013, the party was awarded the Deputy President ticket of what is Raila Odinga's last participation in Kenya presidential election. The coalition lost to jubilee party in the August 8, 2017 election and successfully petitioned the Supreme Court to annul the results.

The party supported the boycott in the repeat Presidential election on October 26, 2017, held during what is the incumbent President Uhuru Kenyatta's birthday.

The boycott saw over 12 million voters refusing to vote in what the opposition termed as prerigged election.

Wiper party leader refused to show up on January 30 for the swearing in ceremony for the People’s President Raila Odinga, a move that has left the party fighting for acceptance by its supporters who availed in numbers on that fateful day.

== 2022 General Elections ==
In the 2022 Kenyan general election, the party won 25 seats as part of Azimio la Umoja.

In May 2023, leader Musyoka threatened to abandon talks with the Azimio Coalition and their Kenya Kwanza Alliance.

On 18 June 2025, WDM notified the Office of the Registrar of Political Parties (ORPP) of its intention to change its name to Wiper Patriotic Front (WPF). The name change was certified on 1 August 2025.
