= 2022 Kenyan general election =

12th general election in Kenya

- 9 August 2022 (Note: The Kakamega and Mombasa gubernatorial elections were postponed to 29 August 2022. Elections were also held on the same day in four National Assembly constituencies and two County Assembly constituencies. Eldas Constituency held their elections on 10 August 2022)
- Registered: 22,120,458
- Presidential election
- Turnout: 64.77% (▲25.74pp)
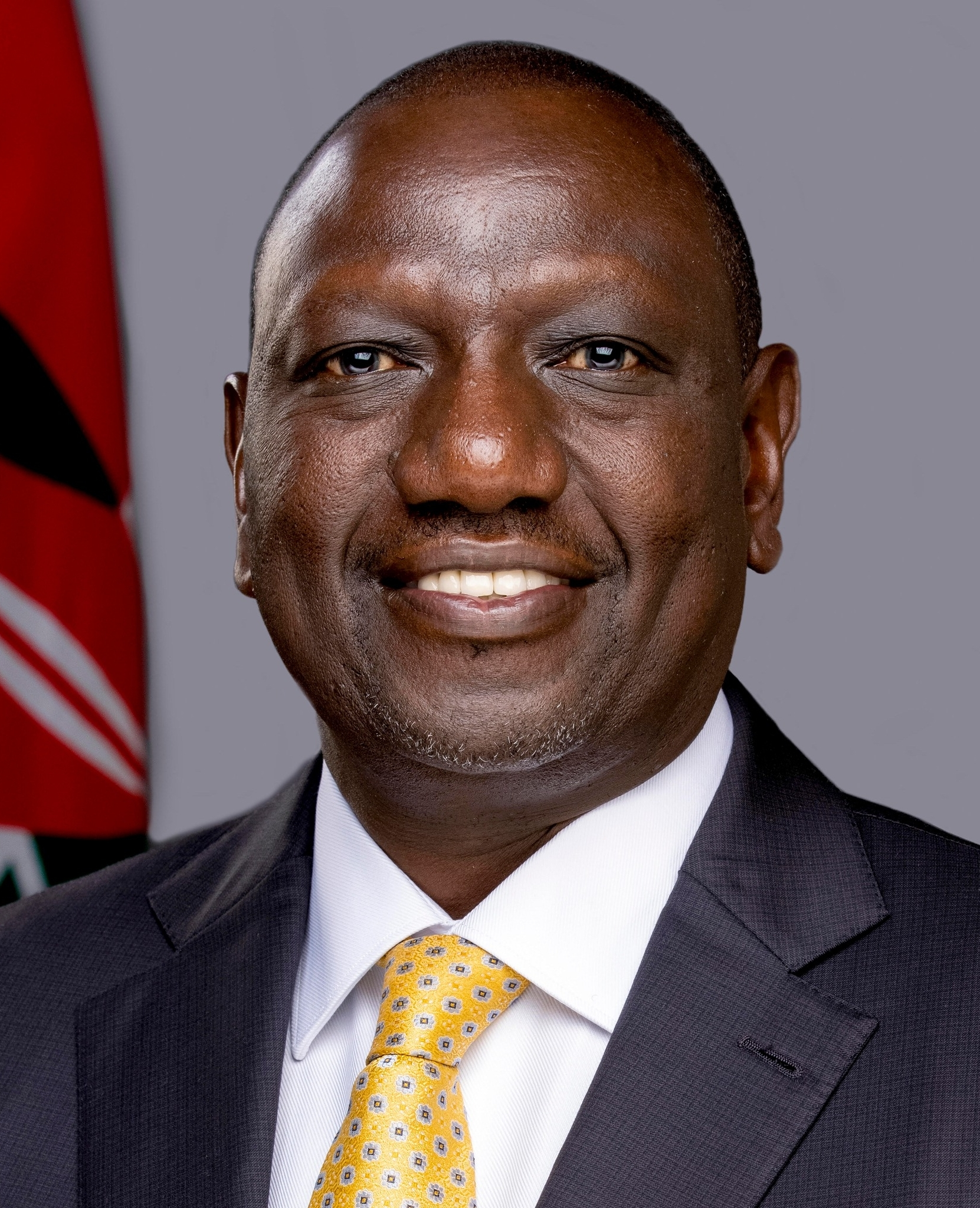

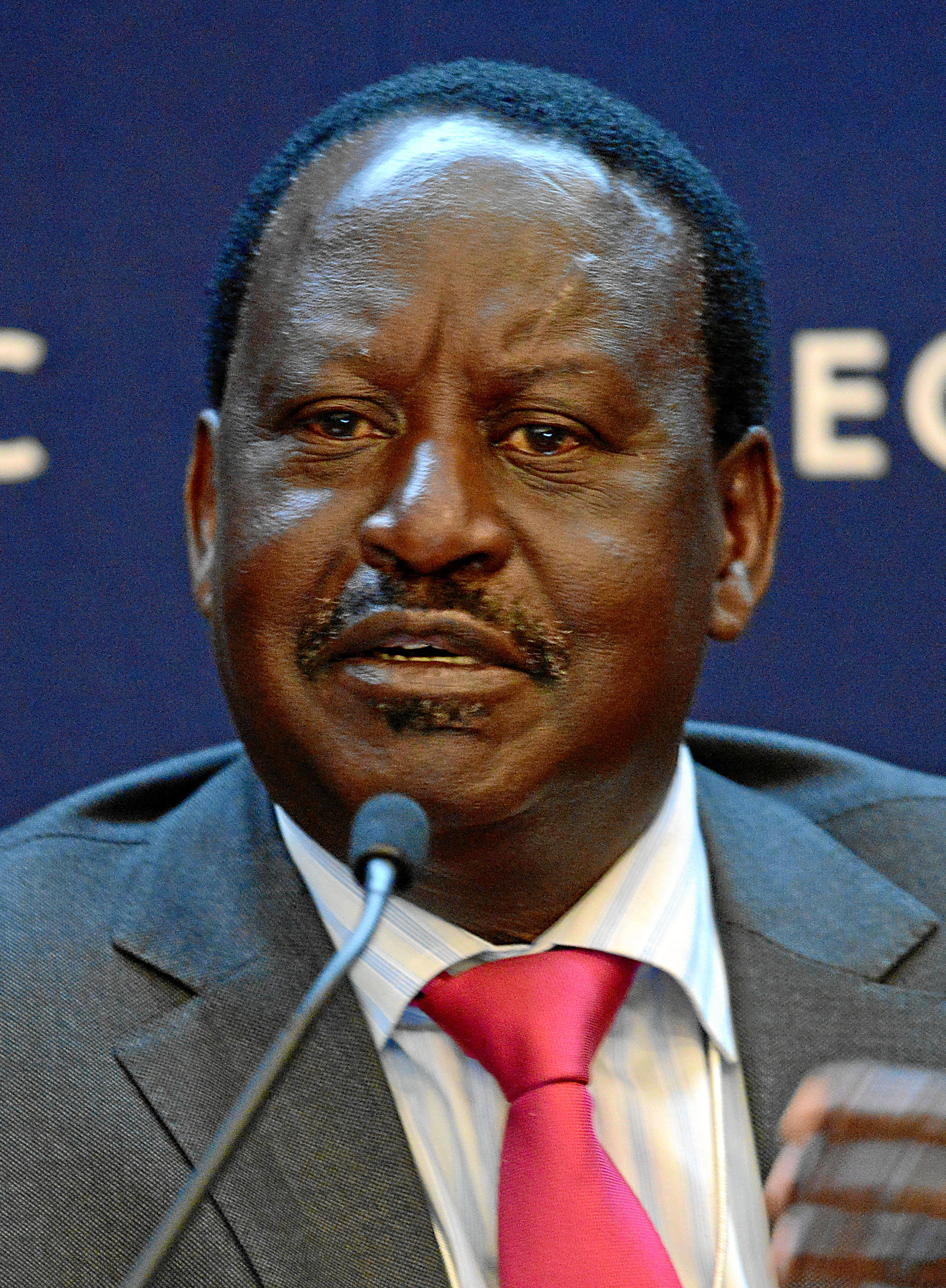
Nominee	William Ruto	Raila Odinga
Party	UDA	Azimio (Note: Odinga is gazetted to run for president under Azimio la Umoja One Kenya Coalition Party. He still remains the leader of ODM.)
Alliance	Kenya Kwanza	Azimio
Running mate	Rigathi Gachagua	Martha Karua
Popular vote	7,176,141	6,942,930
Percentage	50.49%	48.85%
- Results by county
President before election
Uhuru Kenyatta
Jubilee Party
Elected President
William Ruto
UDA
- National Assembly
- 337 of the 349 seats in the National Assembly; 175 seats needed for a majority
Party	Leader	Seats
UDA	William Ruto	143
ODM	Raila Odinga	89
Jubilee Party	Uhuru Kenyatta	28
Wiper	Kalonzo Musyoka	26
Amani	Musalia Mudavadi	8
UDM	Philip Murgor	6
FORD-K	Moses Wetangula	6
DAP	Eugene Wamalwa	5
KANU	Gideon Moi	5
PAA	Amason Kingi	3
KUP		2
MCC	Alfred Mutua	2
Service	Mwangi Kiunjuri	2
UPIA		2
UPA		2
CCK	Moses Kuria	1
Democratic		1
GDDP		1
MDG	David Ochieng Ouma	1
NAP-K	Alfayo Alfonze Agufana	1
NOPEU	Lawrence Mpuru Aburi	1
UDP	Cyrus Jirongo	1
Independents	–	12
This lists parties that won seats. See the complete results below.
Results by constituency
- Senate
- 47 of the 67 seats in the Senate
Party	Leader	Seats
Azimio	Raila Odinga	24
Kenya Kwanza	William Ruto	23
This lists parties that won seats. See the complete results below.

The 2022 Kenyan general election was held on 9 August 2022 to elect the President, members of the National Assembly, senators, county governors, women representatives and members of county assemblies. It was the twelfth general election in Kenya and the third since the promulgation of the 2010 Constitution. In the presidential election, William Ruto of the United Democratic Alliance (UDA) was elected president, receiving 50.49% of the vote and defeating Raila Odinga of the Azimio la Umoja coalition, who received 48.85%.

Incumbent president Uhuru Kenyatta was not eligible for a third term according to the constitution, nor county governors who had served two terms. The 2022 general election saw the lowest number of presidential candidates cleared since the multi-party system was implemented in 1992. Parliamentarians were elected to sit in the 13th Parliament of Kenya.

On 22 August, Odinga filed a petition with the Supreme Court of Kenya challenging the results announced by Wafula Chebukati, the chairman of the Independent Electoral and Boundaries Commission. On 5 September, the Supreme Court rejected the challenge and upheld Ruto's victory. Observers had described the elections as largely peaceful and transparent. Odinga said he would respect the court verdict, although he still claimed victory.

== Background ==
The Constitution of Kenya requires that a general election of members of parliament be held on the second Tuesday of August on every fifth year, which meant that the general election was scheduled for 9 August 2022. If Kenya is at war, the election can be delayed if a resolution is passed in each House of Parliament by at least two-thirds of all the members of the House. Such a resolution can delay the election by up to six months, and may be passed multiple times provided that the delays do not cumulatively exceed 12 months.

The constitution requires that a presidential election take place at the same time as the general election. In the event that prior to the next general election the position of president falls vacant and the office of deputy president is also vacant (who otherwise would assume the office of president), a presidential election could be held at an earlier date. According to the constitution, in such circumstances, an election needs to be held within sixty days after the vacancy arose in the office of president.

Incumbent president Uhuru Kenyatta was not eligible to pursue a third term due to the two-term limit in the constitution. County governors who had served two terms at the helms of their respective counties were also ineligible for a third term.

== Electoral system ==
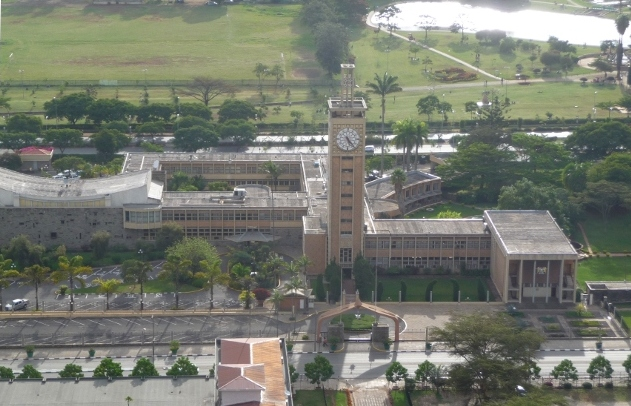
Parliament Buildings, Nairobi

The President of Kenya is elected using a modified version of the two-round system: to win in the first round, a candidate must receive over 50% of the vote nationally and 25% of the vote in at least 24 of Kenya's 47 counties. If no candidate achieves this, a second round is held between the top two candidates, in which the candidate with the most votes wins.

The Parliament of Kenya consists of two houses: the Senate (upper house) and the National Assembly (lower house), both of which were fully renewed for five-year terms. Those elected in 2022 formed the 13th Parliament of Kenya.

The National Assembly has 350 members, of which 290 are elected in single-member constituencies by first-past-the-post voting. Of the remaining 60, 47 are reserved for women and are elected from single-member constituencies based on the 47 counties, also using the first-past-the-post system. The remaining 13 seats include 12 nominated by political parties based on their number of seats and a Speaker, elected by the assembly from outside of it as an ex officio member. The nominated members are reserved for youths, persons with disabilities and workers.

The 68 members of the Senate are elected by four methods; 47 are elected in single-member constituencies based on the counties by first-past-the-post voting. Parties are then assigned a share of 16 seats for women, two for youth and two for persons with disabilities based on their seat share. A speaker is also elected as an ex officio member.

== Presidential candidates ==
Only four presidential aspirants and their running mates from parties were cleared. Walter Mong'are's nomination to run for presidency was revoked, after it emerged his degree was not from a recognized university as required by law. The final list of presidential candidates was;

- David Waihiga Mwaure, leader of the Agano Party
- Raila Odinga, former Prime Minister of Kenya (2008–2013) and leader of the Orange Democratic Movement, under Azimio la Umoja One Kenya Alliance. He was a presidential candidate in 1997, as well as the runner-up in 2007, (Note: There is agreement in the international community that the presidential elections were at least partially manipulated. In July 2008, an exit poll commissioned by the United States was released, which predicted Odinga to have won the presidency by a comfortable margin of 6%, 46% to 40%, well outside the exit poll's 1.3% margin of error.) 2013, and 2017.
- William Ruto, Deputy President of Kenya (2013–2022) and leader of the United Democratic Alliance, under Kenya Kwanza Alliance party
- George Wajackoyah, leader of the Roots Party Kenya

== Campaign ==
Leading up to the 2022 election, a new political dynamic based on class politics was emerging in Kenya, framed as "hustlers" versus "dynasties". The families of incumbent President Uhuru Kenyatta and opposition leader Raila Odinga had dominated Kenyan politics since independence in 1963. Moreover, Kenya has traditionally been ruled by presidents who belong to either the Kikuyu people – like Kenyatta – or the Kalenjin people, like William Ruto. The potential victory of Odinga, a Luo, would mark a departure for the country, which has 44 ethnic groups.

Ruto initially supported Odinga in the 2007 election against Mwai Kibaki. The announcement of the presidential results led to ethnic clashes among Kenya's tribes. Police crackdowns on protesters and clashes that turned into ethnic attacks killed more than 1,000 people in post-election violence, eventually prompting a new constitution to devolve power. Ruto aligned himself with Kenyatta in 2013. Both Kenyatta and Ruto had been indicted by the International Criminal Court (ICC) on crimes against humanity charges for their alleged role in orchestrating the post-election violence in the 2007 election. The cases later collapsed, with former ICC chief prosecutor Fatou Bensouda saying a relentless campaign of victim and witness intimidation made the trial impossible.

In March 2018, President Kenyatta and his former rival for the presidency, Odinga, stunned the public when they shook hands and declared a truce after post-election violence in 2017 left dozens of people dead. The two leaders also sought to expand the executive through the Building Bridges Initiative (BBI) constitutional changes, which would have potentially allowed Kenyatta to stay in power as a prime minister. But despite the Supreme Court of Kenya ruling against the proposed amendments in August, the unexpected alliance has persevered, with Odinga attending official government functions with Kenyatta. Cracks within the Jubilee government began to appear, leading to an eventual fallout between Kenyatta and his deputy, Ruto.

=== Presidential nomination ===
In December 2021, the Mount Kenya Foundation, one of the country's most powerful and wealthy Kikuyu lobbies, announced their support for Odinga, while Kenyatta has repeatedly said that the next president will be "neither Kikuyu nor Kalenjin". On 10 December 2021, Odinga declared his intention to run for the presidency for the fifth time.

In January 2022, Ruto's United Democratic Alliance (UDA) announced a coalition pact with the Amani National Congress, FORD–Kenya and several other political parties. The new coalition was called Kenya Kwanza.

In February 2022, Kenyatta's Jubilee party announced that it would join the Azimio la Umoja coalition headed by Odinga, the leader of the Orange Democratic Movement (ODM). On 12 March 2022, at least 26 political parties, including major political parties Jubilee, Wiper, ODM and KANU, signed a co-operation pact endorsing Raila Odinga's presidential candidature. That same day, Kenyatta publicly endorsed Odinga for the presidency.

On 15 March 2022, the UDA and Kenya Kwanza endorsed Ruto as their presidential candidate.

=== Deputy presidential nomination ===
Several individuals showed interest in the position of deputy president. Azimio la Umoja held interviews for 10 prospective running mates, namely: Kalonzo Musyoka, Martha Karua, Peter Munya, Sabina Chege, Peter Kenneth, Stephen Kipkiyeny Tarus, Ali Hassan Joho, Wycliffe Oparanya, Lee Kinyanjui and Charity Ngilu. Musyoka, Odinga's two-time running mate, threatened to skip the interviews, but ultimately appeared for an interview on 10 May 2022. In the Kenya Kwanza camp, several names were rumoured to be possible running mates, namely: Rigathi Gachagua, Kindiki Kithure, Anne Waiguru, Ndindi Nyoro, Justin Muturi and Musalia Mudavadi.

In April 2022, Roots Party candidate George Wajackoyah named Justina Wamae, a former candidate for Parliament from Mavoko Constituency, as his running mate. On 15 May 2022, Kenya Kwanza endorsed Rigathi Gachagua as Ruto's running mate. Azimio la Umoja selected Martha Karua as Odinga's running mate on 16 May 2022. The Agano Party's Waihiga Mwaure selected Ruth Mucheru Mutua as his running mate.

=== Manifestos ===
Azimio la Umoja was the first political outfit to launch their manifesto on 6 June 2022. The ten point manifesto voiced key issues such as a corruption-free government. The manifesto came in the form of a declaration and promised to strengthen devolution; economically empower women; waste no single child; spur the economic pillar; facilitate climate-smart agriculture; revamp the manufacturing sector; enact responsible leadership; preserve sovereignty of the people; increase access to clean water; create "Baba Care", which would focus on social protection and transformation; and upscale health coverage to universal health care.

Ruto's UDA and Wajackoyah's Roots Party launched their manifestos on 30 June 2022. Ruto, who intended to apply a "bottom-up economic model", presented a manifesto promising to revive the economy, provide healthcare for all, promote micro, small and medium enterprises (MSME), and implement a two-thirds gender rule and affordable housing, among other policies.

Wajackoyah intended to legalise marijuana for commercial purposes, introduce snake farming, export dog meat, shut and bring down the standard-gauge railway, hang the corrupt, suspend the constitution, introduce four-day work week, move capital city to Isiolo, create eight states, and repatriate idle foreigners.

On 4 July 2022, Agano Party presidential candidate David Mwaure Waihiga launched his 12-point manifesto. He argued that it was time for the country to move forward and start on a new slate in terms of leadership. He planned to pledge alliance to the constitution; to family, women, youth, persons living with disability, county governments, workers, business owners, the economy, religious institutions and the environment; as well as to the international community. He also promised to recover public monies stashed in offshore accounts as well as dissolve the Nairobi City County government.

=== Electoral candidates debates ===
On 2 March 2022, the Media Council of Kenya, in conjunction with the Media Owners Association and Kenya Editors' Guild, announced plans to conduct presidential debates in July 2022. Clifford Machoka was appointed to organise the presidential and deputy presidential debates. The debates were scheduled to run on 11, 19, and 26 July 2022 at Catholic University of Eastern Africa; and they were to be broadcast live across most television and radio stations, and their online platforms. A Nairobi City County gubernatorial debate was also scheduled amongst the presidential and deputy presidential debates due to it being Kenya's capital. Each of the debates ran in two sessions; the first session involved candidates who stood below 5% in the last three opinion polls, while the second session was between candidates reaching above 5% in the same polls.

On 11 July 2022, the first tier of the Nairobi gubernatorial debate took place and four of the seven candidates expected took the stage, namely: Nancy Mwadime of the Usawa kwa Wote Party, Herman Grewal of Safina, Kenneth Nyamwamu of the United Progressive Alliance and independent candidate Esther Thairu. The second tier of the debate, which aired on primetime, put former Nairobi deputy governor Polycarp Igathe against incumbent senator Johnson Sakaja, though the latter arrived 20 minutes late into the debate. The deputy presidential debate that involved four candidates also aired in two sessions: Wamae faced off against Mucheru. Karua and Gachagua duelled in the second tier. An estimated 34 million Kenyans tuned in for the deputy presidential debate; an estimated 18.7 million of those who followed the debate were registered voters. 70% watched the second tier while 5% viewed the first. The hallmark of the three debates, the presidential debate, was the final one, and it was to have Mwaure go against Wajackoyah first, while Odinga and Ruto face off in the second tier. However, Odinga and Wajackoyah dropped out of the presidential debate. Odinga argued that he could not debate with Ruto, whom he accused of having questionable integrity. Wajackoyah's demand to debate with the two main presidential candidates was not met; though he made his way to the debating venue before storming off. Mwaure and Ruto were featured alone in their respective sessions. In addition to joint presidential debates, individual television stations aired gubernatorial debates from other counties, and a constituency debate.

=== Campaign season ===
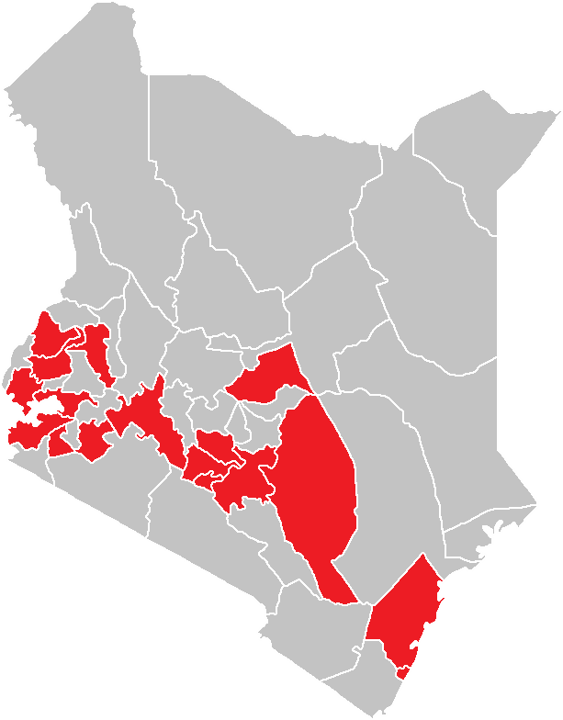
"Vote-rich counties" or counties with over 500,000 registered voters.

The campaign season officially kicked off on 29 May 2022 as clearance of electoral candidates continued. Although the presidential election was considered a two-horse race between Odinga and Ruto, Wajackoyah gained significant popularity within the electorate due to his radical measures to quell the ballooning public debt. Ruto's Kenya Kwanza proclaimed themselves 'hustlers', calling Odinga a dynasty and a 'project' of the outgoing government. Odinga's Azimio la Umoja branded Kenya Kwanza as an alliance of the corrupt since most of the leaders in the coalition are suspected, accused, or convicted of corruption and other integrity issues. Odinga billed himself and his running mate Karua as liberators who fought for the multiparty system, campaigned for the new regime in 2002 and were proponents of the 2010 constitutional dispensation. On 28 July 2022, Ruto's running mate Gachagua was ordered by the anti-corruption court to forfeit Ksh 202 million to the state after it was determined the funds were proceeds of corruption.

On 6 August 2022, all candidates across all elective seats held their final campaigns in different parts of the country. Odinga held his last rally at Moi International Sports Centre; Ruto at Nyayo in Nairobi and Kirigiti Stadia in Kiambu County; Wajackoyah and Mwaure in different parts of Nairobi.

== Conduct ==
=== Mass voter listing ===
The Independent Electoral and Boundaries Commission (IEBC) announced plans to roll out the first phase of a 30-day mass voter registration exercise beginning 4 October 2021. The exercise targeted between 6 and 7 million new voters. However, with the home stretch of voter registration approaching, the commission raised concerns over its failure to reach its target. On 17 January 2022, the three-week second phase of the mass voter listing targeting 4.5 million voters kicked off, registering low turnout as well. In May 2022, the commission suspended voter registration to March 2023, attributing the move to the auditing and verification processes that may alter with the timelines set ahead of the elections.

=== Electoral candidates clearance ===
IEBC registered all aspirants expected to run for the various elective seats between 29 May and 7 June 2022. William Ruto and Raila Odinga were cleared on 4 and 5 June respectively, in an event that would see them present their nomination papers.

In June 2022, reports began to emerge that Sakaja Johnson presented a fake certificate to IEBC from a Ugandan university and that he never graduated from the University of Nairobi (UoN). Initially, Sakaja had stated in interviews that he was an alumnus of UoN, where he purportedly pursued a bachelor's degree in actuarial science. It would later emerge that Sakaja was yet to complete his studies at UoN since his enrollment in 2003. He admitted in a radio interview that he did not graduate from the city's university, accusing Uhuru Kenyatta of plotting to destroy his political ambitions. At the time of clearance, he had presented a Bachelor of Science in Management certificate from Uganda's Team University, where he alleged he was an external student. On 29 June 2022, the Commission for University Education revoked his degree, pending investigations. The IEBC declined to revoke Sakaja's clearance, stating it can only disqualify him candidate if issued with a court order. Uganda's Inspector General ordered a probe into the legislator's degree saga. On 12 July 2022, the High Court dismissed a petition over Sakaja's degree, faulting the petitioner, Dennis Gakuu Wahome, for failing to discharge the burden of proof that the gubernatorial candidate degree certificate was fake.

Former Nairobi governor Mike Sonko was denied clearance to run for the Mombasa governorship following his impeachment in 2020. Sonko filed a petition at the High Court to have it compel IEBC to clear him for the gubernatorial race. On 13 July 2022, the court noted in its ruling that Sonko's impeachment case was yet to be determined by the Supreme Court, and ordered the electoral commission to clear Sonko to vie for the Mombasa governorship. On 14 July 2022, Sonko presented his nomination papers at IEBC where he was cleared to vie for Mombasa governor. On 15 July 2022, the Supreme Court ruled that Sonko was duly impeached by the county assembly of Nairobi City, which automatically makes Sonko fail the integrity test to occupy any elective or appointed office. Following the court's decision, IEBC revoked his clearance.

=== IEBC preparation for general election ===
By the end of clearance, IBEC gazetted a total of 16,098 candidates contesting 1,882 elective slots. IEBC received the first batch of ballot papers on 7 July 2022. The ballot papers were printed by a Greek firm known as Inform P Lykos, situated in Athens, which was awarded the tender worth Ksh 3 billion. The Kenya Integrated Election Management System (KIEMS) was used as the primary mode of voter verification, with the manual register used as a supplementary when these KIEMS kits fail. This led to a vast discussion across the political spectrum on the possibility of KIEMS being subject to manipulation. Some noted that Smartmatic International, the supplier of the digital register, is not short of controversy.

On 21 July 2022, three Venezuelan nationals were intercepted at the Jomo Kenyatta International Airport with what were believed to be sensitive election materials. IEBC released a statement on their social media platform decrying the detention of Smartmatic International staff. Directorate of Criminal Investigations (DCI) boss George Kinoti released an official statement claiming the two Venezuelan nationals traveled with expired passports, were in possession of 'questionable' material and were on a business trip. The foreigners had stickers that were to be used in the election. IEBC explained that the stickers had information on the polling station, polling centre, ward, constituency and county. On 28 July 2022, following their public spat, DCI and IEBC ended their row, amicably agreeing that the issue with the stickers had been solved.

=== General elections ===
On 8 August 2022, IEBC suspended the gubernatorial elections in Kakamega and Mombasa counties, as well as the parliamentary polls for Pokot South, Rongai and Kacheliba constituencies. Chebukati noted that the ballot papers for affected areas had errors, including pictures for candidates and details. Apart from the mentioned counties and constituencies, IEBC also suspended elections in five wards over candidates' deaths. Voters in the affected areas voted on 23 August 2022.

On election day, voting in Eldas Constituency of Wajir County was postponed to 10 August 2022 due to security concerns. This was after the constituency returning officer was hospitalised after being shot in the leg.

The voting exercise was greatly affected by the failure of the KIEMS kits to pick voters' fingerprints. IEBC allowed the use of manual register in parts of Kakamega and Makueni counties after a blight of hitches from the KIEMS kits. Some polling stations opened later than the stipulated time of 6 am, leading to delayed voting.

By midday on election day, 6,567,859 voters, constituting 30% of those registered, had cast their ballots. An hour before the closure of polling centers at 5 pm, the electoral commission reported a voter turnout of 12,065,803, equating to 56.17% of registered voters. On 10 August 2022, IEBC announced that 14 million Kenyans, who were identified electronically, had voted bringing the total percentage to 65.4%.

Didmus Barasa, the Member of Parliament for Kimilili Constituency, had been accused of shooting dead his rival's security guard and fleeing the scene following the event.

Observers described the elections as largely peaceful and transparent.

=== Interference ===
An investigation into a company that has reportedly interfered in elections worked on the 2022 Kenyan election. A strategist working on the campaign of William Ruto claims that his Telegram account had been hacked before the elections, including increased activities. It was revealed that this was done by Tal Hanan, an Israeli businessman who has reportedly interfered in several elections around the world. Hanan also hacked the Telegram and Gmail accounts linked to other advisers working with the Ruto campaign.

While the client behind the hacks has not been revealed, Odinga has acknowledged that he hired white hat hackers, or ethical hackers, to uncover evidence to uncover electoral fraud that saw him lose the election.

== Opinion polls ==
This table below lists polls completed since Raila Odinga announced that he would enter the race.

Polling firm	Fieldwork date	Sample size			Others	Undecided	No response
Polling firm	Fieldwork date	Sample size	Odinga Azimio	Ruto UDA	Others	Undecided	No response
Tifa Research	31 July–1 August 2022	2,268	49%	41%	1.8%	8%	
(Infotrak for Nation Media Group)	30 July–1 August 2022	2,400	49%	41%	2.2%	7%	0.8%
Afroopinion	23–31 July 2022	450	49%	45.6%	5.4%		
Ipsos	23–30 July 2022	6,105	47%	41%	3.1%	3.8%	5.1%
Tifa Research	21–26 July 2022	2,056	46.7%	44.4%	2%	5.2%	1.9%
Tifa Research	25–30 June 2022	1,533	42%	39%	4%	10%	4%
InfotraK	23–27 May 2022	9,000	42%	38%	1%	20%	
Tifa Research	17 May 2022	1,719	39%	35%	2%	14%	8%
(Infotrak for Nation Media Group)	8–9 May 2022	—N/a	42%	42%	2%	10%	5%
Tifa Research	22–26 April 2022	2,033	32%	39%	1%	16%	12%
Radio Africa Limited	April 2022	—N/a	41.3%	45.5%	—N/a	—N/a	—N/a
Radio Africa Limited	March 2022	—N/a	46.7%	43.4%	3%	—N/a	2.3%
Radio Africa Limited	February 2022	—N/a	35.1%	47.1%	—N/a	—N/a	—N/a
Tifa Research	9–13 February 2022	1,541	27%	38.7%	4.3%	20%	10%
Radio Africa Limited	January 2022	—N/a	35.1%	46.1%	—N/a	—N/a	—N/a
Tifa Research	9–13 November 2021	1,519	23%	38%	6%	23%	10%
Radio Africa Limited	November 2021	—N/a	28.6%	45.6%	—N/a	—N/a	—N/a
Radio Africa Limited	July 2021	—N/a	14.2%	42.7%	—N/a	—N/a	—N/a
Radio Africa Limited	January 2020	—N/a	19.9%	38.8%	—N/a	—N/a	—N/a

== Results and reactions ==
The results had been scheduled to be announced at 3 pm on 15 August 2022, however, by 5 pm no announcement had been made. Four IEBC commissioners, led by vice chair Juliana Cherera, held a press conference stating that they do not "take ownership" of the results, citing issues with the final tallying process. The results were announced at 6 pm by IEBC chairman Wafula Chebukati. All candidates except Raila Odinga appeared at the announcement; Odinga's chief agent Saitabao Ole Kanchory announced that Odinga would not appear until his campaign team could verify the results. As Chebukati and other two commissioners made their way into the Bomas of Kenya auditorium, violence erupted in the venue and the IEBC staff were escorted away. After security personnel resolved the situation, Chebukati made his way to the auditorium and announced the results, naming William Ruto as the president-elect.

The following day, 16 August, the dissident IEBC commissioners, Cherera, Francis Wanderi, Irene Masit and Justus Nyang’aya, gave a more detailed explanation of the division within the commission. The four stated that the total percentage exceeded 100%, the results were not processed and analysed by all the commissioners, and that Chebukati did not provide the total numbers of registered voters, votes cast, or rejected ballots. They accused Chebukati of announcing results prematurely, before votes from some counties had been incorporated, and accused Chebukati of exceeding his legal role. This was disputed by the Elections Observations Group, a Kenyan NGO, who stated "The commission's verification process was credible and every critical player was involved with that process – from observers, political party agents, media, body officials ... The commission made data publicly available". Chebukati also defended his announcement by stating that the 100.01% result was attributable to a rounding error, and accused the four dissenting commissioners of trying to force a re-run of the election.

Odinga rejected the outcome of the presidential election and announced he would begin a legal challenge. He termed the election a "travesty", "unconstitutional", and "null and void". Odinga also asked for his supporters to refrain from violence. On 22 August, Odinga filed a court challenge to the result. Odinga claimed the election results were based on criminal and fraudulent activities, his party agents were barred access to several election sites, technology was used for fraud, and the fraud was preplanned. Several others filed complaints too, claiming for instance that the results were not included in the tallying and verification of the IEBC chairman from 28 constituencies with at least 8% of the votes. On 5 September, Kenya's Supreme Court rejected the petitions and upheld Ruto's victory. Observers had described the elections as largely peaceful and transparent. Odinga said he would respect the court verdict, although he still claimed victory.

=== President ===
Candidate	Running mate	Party	Votes	%
William Ruto	Rigathi Gachagua	United Democratic Alliance	7,176,141	50.49
Raila Odinga	Martha Karua	Azimio la Umoja	6,942,930	48.85
George Wajackoyah	Justina Wamae	Roots Party Kenya	61,969	0.44
David Waihiga	Ruth Mutua	Agano Party	31,987	0.23
Total			14,213,027	100.00
Valid votes			14,213,027	99.21
Invalid/blank votes			113,614	0.79
Total votes			14,326,641	100.00
Registered voters/turnout			22,120,458	64.77
Source: IEBC

==== By county ====
Code	County	Registered voters	Total votes	Invalid/ blank	Valid votes	Odinga	Ruto	Wajackoyah	Waihiga
1	Mombasa	642,362	281,113	3,812	277,301	161,015	113,700	2,104	482
2	Kwale	328,316	180,368	1,359	179,009	125,541	51,918	1,137	413
3	Kilifi	588,842	288,813	3,191	285,496	204,536	77,331	2,534	1,221
4	Tana River	141,110	94,573	1,068	93,505	51,390	41,505	412	198
5	Lamu	81,468	50,957	887	50,070	26,160	22,876	848	186
6	Taita–Taveta	182,126	112,493	999	111,494	81,271	29,148	826	249
7	Garissa	201,513	110,550	590	109,960	81,376	28,111	396	77
8	Wajir	207,767	134,447	1,014	133,391	83,486	49,062	626	217
9	Mandera	217,034	136,411	846	135,565	106,279	28,351	676	259
10	Marsabit	166,944	115,385	481	114,904	55,675	58,782	303	144
11	Isiolo	89,535	59,514	536	58,978	26,449	32,302	175	52
12	Meru	772,573	511,285	4,809	506,476	103,679	398,946	2,798	1,053
13	Tharaka-Nithi	231,966	162,558	980	161,578	15,062	145,081	974	461
14	Embu	334,684	222,947	1,899	221,048	31,469	188,874	1,339	554
15	Kitui	532,833	332,397	3,324	329,073	203,750	77,912	2,412	1,216
16	Machakos	687,565	413,997	3,759	410,238	258,647	79,386	2,525	872
17	Makueni	479,401	292,726	1,908	290,819	229,187	59,331	1,848	572
18	Nyandarua	361,217	242,238	1,622	240,616	49,228	189,519	1,048	821
19	Nyeri	481,632	329,151	2,271	326,880	52,043	272,507	1,344	982
20	Kirinyaga	376,001	262,723	1,823	262,723	37,978	220,752	1,361	644
21	Murang'a	620,929	422,897	2,554	420,343	67,181	310,895	1,723	1,379
22	Kiambu	1,275,008	830,826	5,635	825,191	210,302	605,761	4,373	3,798
23	Turkana	238,528	144,631	1099	143,532	56,300	29,333	227	139
24	West Pokot	220,026	174,963	1,258	173,705	63,147	109,940	298	160
25	Samburu	100,014	70,688	340	70,348	41,737	28,319	238	62
26	Trans-Nzoia	398,981	252,983	2,470	250,513	131,581	115,750	875	412
27	Uasin Gishu	506,138	351,946	2,083	349,863	76,032	272,862	590	390
28	Elgeyo-Marakwet	213,884	166,761	1,537	165,224	4,902	160,092	176	120
29	Nandi	406,288	309,067	1,492	307,575	24,872	240,820	404	256
30	Baringo	281,053	218,105	1,014	217,091	40,316	143,429	425	186
31	Laikipia	263,012	170,420	1,336	169,084	34,276	105,827	522	389
32	Nakuru	1,054,856	691,673	5,503	686,170	170,169	357,439	1,756	1,536
33	Narok	398,784	400,449	1,597	398,852	106,967	132,366	303	181
34	Kajiado	463,273	310,271	1,647	308,624	157,704	147,974	1,132	778
35	Kericho	428,067	336,337	1,821	334,516	14,442	272,975	362	180
36	Bomet	875,689	301,151	1,545	299,606	15,132	333,491	667	274
37	Kakamega	844,551	844,709	5,562	503,719	325,302	130,184	3,224	1,128
38	Vihiga	310,043	186,448	2,115	184,333	113,623	66,717	1,448	503
39	Bungoma	646,598	410,667	5,516	405,151	144,658	255,337	2,480	1, 511
40	Busia	416,756	279,619	2,889	276,730	226,317	48,827	1,406	474
41	Siaya	533,595	378,248	1,894	376,354	371,201	4,307	735	209
42	Kisumu	606,754	433,577	2,572	431,005	419,141	10,049	734	247
43	Homa Bay	551,071	406,157	2,045	404,112	397,499	3,469	719	139
44	Migori	469,019	349,384	1,611	347,773	292,451	64,645	810	338
45	Kisii	637,010	407,227	4,391	402,836	262,618	133,838	1,590	696
46	Nyamira	323,283	210,648	1,997	208,651	126,284	76,541	849	339
47	Nairobi City	2,416,551	1,352,236	12,869	1,339,367	760,506	560,293	5,846	4,563
	Total	22,110,015							
	(+) Diaspora								
291	Diaspora	10,443				3,435	1,840	36	30
	Total	22,120,458				6,942,930	7,176,141	61,969	31,987

The Mount Kenya region played a pivotal role in shaping the outcome of Kenya's 2022 presidential election. Comprising 10 ten counties, it had approximately 5.7 million registered voters which is about 27% of Kenya's national registered voters. Ruto won largely in the region with 2,938,802 votes (76.96%), outstripping Odinga's 847,205 votes (22.19%). Ruto's strongest performance was in Tharaka-Nithi (89.18 %), and even in traditionally more competitive Nakuru, he secured 65.90% against Odinga's 32.69%. Turnout ranged from 65% in Laikipia to 70% in Tharaka-Nithi County. This overwhelming bloc support, delivering nearly 3 million votes, was crucial in tipping the national result in Ruto's favor. Ruto won largely in Mount Kenya East region especially in Tharaka-Nithi County and Embu County, while Odinga secured most of his votes in Mount Kenya west due to diversity and urbanization.

Nairobi City, being both the capital and the largest urban center in Kenya, was a key battleground for presidential candidates. Odinga won with 57% of the votes cast defeating Ruto who garnered 41% of the votes cast. Raila Odinga dominated in constituencies such as Kibra, Ruaraka, and Dagoretti North, reflecting strong support in densely populated urban and informal settlement areas. William Ruto performed better in constituencies such as Roysambu, Kasarani, and Dagoretti South, where peri-urban and mixed-income populations are more significant. Overall, Odinga secured a majority of the votes in Nairobi City, contributing significantly to his nationwide performance in the 2022 presidential election. The county's results highlighted Nairobi as a major urban stronghold for the Azimio la Umoja coalition.

=== Parliament ===
==== National Assembly ====
Party or alliance		Seats		
Party or alliance		Appointed	Total	+/–
Azimio la Umoja	Orange Democratic Movement	3	89	+12
Azimio la Umoja	Jubilee Party	1	28	–141
Azimio la Umoja	Wiper Democratic Movement – Kenya	1	26	+3
Azimio la Umoja	United Democratic Movement	0	7	+7
Azimio la Umoja	Democratic Action Party	0	5	New
Azimio la Umoja	Kenya African National Union	0	5	–5
Azimio la Umoja	Pamoja African Alliance	0	3	New
Azimio la Umoja	Maendeleo Chap Chap Party	0	2	–2
Azimio la Umoja	United Party of Independent Alliance	0	2	New
Azimio la Umoja	Kenya Union Party	0	2	New
Azimio la Umoja	United Progressive Alliance	0	2	New
Azimio la Umoja	Movement for Democracy and Growth	0	1	+1
Azimio la Umoja	United Democratic Party	0	1	+1
Azimio la Umoja	Total	5	173	–106
Kenya Kwanza	United Democratic Alliance	5	143	New
Kenya Kwanza	Amani National Congress	1	8	–6
Kenya Kwanza	Forum for the Restoration of Democracy – Kenya	1	6	–6
Kenya Kwanza	The Service Party	0	2	New
Kenya Kwanza	Chama Cha Kazi	0	1	New
Kenya Kwanza	Democratic Party	0	1	0
Kenya Kwanza	Total	5	161	+135
Grand Dream Development Party		0	1	New
National Agenda Party		0	1	0
National Ordinary People Empowerment Union		0	1	New
Independents		0	12	–2
Total		12	349	0
Source: NTV (Kenya) Kenyans

==== Senate ====
Party	Seats		
Party	County	Appointed	Total
Kenya Kwanza	24	10	34
Azimio la Umoja	23	10	33
Total	47	20	67

== Gubernatorial elections ==
Gubernatorial elections in Kenya

The 2022 Kenyan gubernatorial elections were held on 9 August 2022 as part of the wider general elections, with elections in Mombasa County and Kakamega County postponed to 22 August by the Independent Electoral and Boundaries Commission (IEBC). The elections saw a significant shift in the distribution of gubernatorial positions compared with the 2017 elections, with the Jubilee Party losing 24 seats it had won in the 2017 election, while the Orange Democratic Movement (ODM) gained two more seats.

The United Democratic Alliance (UDA) won 20 positions, most of them in the former Rift Valley Province and the Mount Kenya region (8 of 9 counties). The Orange Democratic Movement (ODM) won 15 gubernatorial positions and secured most victories in Nyanza (5 of 6) and Western (3 of 4). The Wiper Democratic Movement secured all three counties of the Lower Eastern region. The United Democratic Movement (UDM) received two counties, while the Jubilee Party, Amani National Congress, Democratic Action Party of Kenya, FORD–Kenya and UPA each received one county, and two governors were elected as independents.

The elections also led to significant changes in county leadership. Eight of the returning governors were former governors who reclaimed their positions, while 25 of the 45 governors who were initially elected in the first round were first-time governors, while 11 incumbents retained their seats. The elections also made history by electing a record seven women governors, increasing the number of women serving as elected county executives in Kenya.

=== Results ===
County	Governor	Party	Results
Mombasa	Abdulswamad Nassir	ODM	Abdulswamad Nassir 54.09%; Hassan Omar 44.56% (UDA)
Kwale	Fatuma Achani	UDA	Fatuma Achani 33.38%; Hamadi Boga 30.19% (ODM)
Kilifi	Gideon Mung’aro	ODM	Gideon Mung’aro 50.69%; Aisha Jumwa 23.23% (UDA)
Tana River	Dhadho Godhana	ODM	Dhadho Godhana 35.09%; Hussein Dado 34.75% (UDA)
Lamu	Issa Timamy	ANC	Issa Timamy 48.44%; Fahim Twaha 32.13% (Jubilee)
Taita-Taveta	Andrew Mwadime	Independent	Andrew Mwadime 45.90%; Granton Samboja 21.80% (Jubilee)
Garissa	Nathif Jama	ODM	Nathif Jama 39.37%; Ali Korane 39.08% (UDA)
Wajir	Ahmed Abdullahi	ODM	Ahmed Abdullahi 35.50%; Hassan Mohamed Adam 27.20% (Jubilee)
Mandera	Mohamed Adan Khalif	UDM	Mohamed Adan Khalif 56.28%; Aden Mohamed 42.69% (Jubilee)
Marsabit	Mohamud Ali	UDM	Mohamud Ali 33.79%; Francis Ganya 24.63% (KANU)
Isiolo	Abdi Guyo	Jubilee	Abdi Guyo 49.78%; Godana Doyo 45.21% (Independent)
Meru	Kawira Mwangaza	Independent	Kawira Mwangaza 41.51%; Mithika Linturi 36.49% (UDA)
Tharaka-Nithi	Muthomi Njuki	UDA	Muthomi Njuki 60.38%; Erastus Njoka 36.14% (Jubilee)
Embu	Cecily Mbarire	UDA	Cecily Mbarire 49.77%; Lenny Kivuti 48.23% (DEP)
Kitui	Julius Malombe	Wiper	Julius Malombe 60.23%; David Musila 35.77% (CCU)
Machakos	Wavinya Ndeti	Wiper	Wavinya Ndeti 55.52%; Nzioka Waita 31.65% (CCU)
Makueni	Mutula Kilonzo Jr.	Wiper	Mutula Kilonzo Jr. 73.94%; Patrick Musimba 21.85% (UDA)
Nyandarua	Moses Kiarie Badilisha	UDA	Moses Kiarie Badilisha 66.00%; Francis Kimemia 21.77% (Jubilee)
Nyeri	Mutahi Kahiga	UDA	Mutahi Kahiga 65.51%; Thuo Mathenge 25.01% (NDP)
Kirinyaga	Anne Waiguru	UDA	Anne Waiguru 51.69%; Purity Ngirici 48.31% (Independent)
Murang'a	Irungu Kang'ata	UDA	Irungu Kang'ata 73.78%; Jamleck Kamau 26.22% (Jubilee)
Kiambu	Kimani Wamatangi	UDA	Kimani Wamatangi 42.65%; Patrick Wainaina 29.06% (Independent)
Turkana	Jeremiah Lomorukai	ODM	Jeremiah Lomorukai 46.44%; John Lodepe 29.18% (UDA)
West Pokot	Simon Kachapin	UDA	Simon Kachapin 49.23%; John Lonyangapuo 48.16% (KUP)
Samburu	Lati Lelelit	UDA	Lati Lelelit 58.04%; Richard Lesiyampe 38.23% (Independent)
Trans-Nzoia	George Natembeya	DAP-K	George Natembeya 65.33%; Chris Wamalwa 32.49% (FORD-Kenya)
Uasin Gishu	Jonathan Bii	UDA	Jonathan Bii 61.67%; Zedekiah Bundotich 36.60% (Independent)
Elgeyo-Marakwet	Wisley Rotich	UDA	Wisley Rotich 85.50%; Anthony Chelimo 6.81% (NVP)
Nandi	Stephen Sang	UDA	Stephen Sang 78.08%; Cleophas Lagat 17.91% (Independent)
Baringo	Benjamin Cheboi	UDA	Benjamin Cheboi 63.65%; Moses Lessonet 28.18% (Jubilee)
Laikipia	Joshua Irungu	UDA	Joshua Irungu 67.86%; Ndiritu Muriithi 28.96% (Jubilee)
Nakuru	Susan Kihika	UDA	Susan Kihika 64.58%; Lee Kinyanjui 33.06% (Jubilee)
Narok	Patrick Ole Ntutu	UDA	Patrick Ole Ntutu 51.92%; Moitalel Ole Kenta 48.08% (ODM)
Kajiado	Joseph Ole Lenku	ODM	Joseph Ole Lenku 38.27%; Katoo Ole Metito 36.35% (UDA)
Kericho	Erick Mutai	UDA	Erick Mutai 95.30%; Isaac Biegon 1.99% (Independent)
Bomet	Hillary Barchok	UDA	Hillary Barchok 53.53%; Isaac Ruto 46.29% (CCM)
Kakamega	Fernandes Barasa	ODM	Fernandes Barasa 54.74%; Cleophas Malala 45.26% (UDA)
Vihiga	Wilber Ottichilo	ODM	Wilber Ottichilo 45.90%; Moses Akaranga 23.66% (PPK)
Bungoma	Ken Lusaka	FORD-Kenya	Ken Lusaka 64.01%; Wycliffe Wangamati 35.99% (DAP-K)
Busia	Paul Otuoma	ODM	Paul Otuoma 59.76%; Sakwa Bunyasi 33.48% (ANC)
Siaya	James Orengo	ODM	James Orengo 58.97%; Nicholas Gumbo 39.49% (UDM)
Kisumu	Anyang’ Nyong’o	ODM	Anyang’ Nyong’o 74.99%; Jack Ranguma 23.58% (UPA)
Homa Bay	Gladys Wanga	ODM	Gladys Wanga 61.14%; Evans Kidero 38.55% (UDA)
Migori	Ochilo Ayacko	ODM	Ochilo Ayacko 50.01%; John Pesa 36.01% (DAP-K)
Kisii	Simba Arati	ODM	Simba Arati 68.54%; Ezekiel Machogu 20.77% (UDA)
Nyamira	Amos Nyaribo	UPA	Amos Nyaribo 62.49%; Walter Nyambati 37.51% (UDA)
Nairobi	Johnson Sakaja	UDA	Johnson Sakaja 54.94%; Polycarp Igathe 45.06% (Jubilee)

== Aftermath ==
Following William Ruto's victory in the 2022 presidential election, Nairobi City experienced significant political turbulence. The announcement of Ruto as president-elect on August 15, 2022, led to widespread protests across parts of the capital. Areas such as Kibera, Kamukunji, and Mathare, which had strongly supported Raila Odinga, witnessed demonstrations expressing dissatisfaction with the election results. These protests were marked by clashes with security forces, leading to injuries and heightened tensions in the city.

=== Misinformation on various social media ===
There was a fake statement shared on Facebook claiming that two local media houses - Royal Media Services and The Standard Group had called the elections in favour of Raila Odinga. According to this fake statement, Raila Odinga was leading the 2022 Presidential elections with 51.13% while William Samoei Ruto was at 48.22%. These claims were denounced by the media houses' senior editors and PesaCheck also confirmed that the statement was fake.

== See also ==
- 2022 Kenyan Presidential Election in Mount Kenya Region
- 2022 Kenyan Presidential Election in Nairobi City
