= Mbugua (surname) =

Mbugua is a surname. Notable people with the surname include:

- Audrey Mbugua (born 1984), Kenyan activist
- Janet Mbugua (born 1984), Kenyan television personality
- Judy Mbugua (born 1947), Kenyan Pentecostal pastor
- Kinuthia Mbugua, Kenyan politician
- Samuel Mbugua (born 1946), Kenyan boxer
- Simon Mbugua (born 1991), Kenyan footballer
