= Keroche Breweries =

Kenyan brewery group

Keroche Breweries Limited
- Industry: Beverages
- Founded: Keroche Foundation
- Founder: Tabitha Karanja, Joseph Karanja
- Headquarters: Karai, Naivasha (Nakuru County), along the Nairobi-Nakuru highway
- Area served: Kenya
- Key people: Tabitha Karanja (President and CEO), Joseph Karanja (Chairman)
- Products: Beers, wines, vodkas, cider, gins, whiskey
- Brands: KB Lager, Summit Lager, Summit Malt, X Double Strength Beer, Valley Wines, Crescent Whisky, Crescent Gin, Crescent Vodka, Viena Ice
- Revenue: KSh18.5 billion (US$185 million) turnover between 2015 and 2019 (2016)
- Number of employees: 850 (FTE)
- Website: www.kerochebreweries.com

Keroche Breweries is a Kenyan brewer and alcoholic beverages manufacturer. Founded in 1997 by Tabitha Karanja and her husband Joseph Karanja as a fortified wine maker, the company has grown to be the second largest alcoholic beverages producer in Kenya. The company's headquarters is located in Naivasha, Kenya. The Karanja family are the company's majority shareholders as well as C-Suite executives. The company's flagship brand is Summit Lager. It also brews Summit Malt and KB Lager. The company also produces a range of wines under the Valley Wines brand, ready-to-drink vodkas under its Viena Ice brand and spirits including dry gin, whiskey, brandy and vodka under its Crescent brand.

== History ==
Keroche Breweries was started in 1997 by Tabitha Karanja, then 32, and her husband, Joseph Karanja, at their family farm. They started with five employees and capital drawn from a hardware shop they owned. It was then called Keroche Industries Limited and produced fortified wines targeted at low-income earners. With time, also ventured into making spirits, once again, targeted at low-income earners. It was part of the local Kenyan alcoholic beverages companies that controversially packed spirits in cheaply priced sachets, leading to accusations of fueling alcoholism. In 2004, sachets were banned in Kenya leading to a reduction in this market. Two years later, in 2007, taxes on locally made wine forced the company to diversify from fortified wines as well. It started manufacturing ready-to-drink vodka. A year later, in 2008, the company ventured into brewing beer, a section of the market then dominated by the Diageo owned East African Breweries Limited. During this period, its products mainstreamed from low-income to generally accepted alcoholic beverages across the Kenyan Market and became a serious player in the beer market.

Keroche Breweries has weathered numerous tax and legal challenges over the years.

== Milestones and awards ==
Keroche Breweries was started on a capital of KSh500,000 (US$5,000). As at 2020, it has grown to have a brewing facility valued at KSh8.5 billion with a KSh1 billion facility to produce wines and spirits. The brewing facility was part of a 2015, KSh10 billion (US$100 million) investment, where Keroche Breweries increased its capacity tenfold to produce 600,000 bottles a day from a previous capacity of 80,000 bottles a day. This investment included a one-million hectolitre brewhouse that could produce up to 30 different brands. In 2020, Keroche introduced a sorghum based beer dubbed KB Lager. This became their third beer in the market after Summit Lager and Summit Malt.

At the 6th Annual Gathering of the African Leadership Network 2015 Summit that was held in Marrakesh, Keroche Breweries was named Africa’s Best Growing Company. Its CEO, Tabitha Karanja, has also won numerous awards including Africa Awards for Entrepreneurship (Transformational Business Award) 2015. She also received a Kenyan State honour from President Mwai Kibaki, the Moran of the Order of the Burning Spear (M.B.S.) Award. In 2014, she won the CNBC East Africa Businesswoman of the Year Award and the CNBC Africa Businesswoman of the Year Award. In 2016, she received the Global Inspirational Women Leadership award and was inducted to the 100 Global Women Leaders Hall of Fame.

== Controversies and legal challenges ==
=== Kenya Bureau of Standards ===
In 2003, the Kenya Bureau of Standards (KEBS) refused to grant Keroche Breweries a standardization mark (permit) for its products. It accused the company of making substandard alcoholic drinks. Without the KEBS mark, Keroche would not have been possible to sell its products in Kenya. KEBS would in 2016 again seek to withdraw the permits from Keroche Breweries. This was after President Mwai Kibaki issued a crackdown order on illicit and substandard alcoholic products. Keroche Breweries, however, moved to court and won the case.

=== Kenya Revenue Authority ===
Keroche Breweries has had long-running battles with the Kenya Revenue Authority (KRA) on tax. In 2015, the company was shut down for two weeks over a backdated duty of about KSh1 billion for the ready-to-drink Viena Ice vodka. KRA ordered the company not to produce excisable goods, an essential shutdown as all alcoholic products are excisable. However, it would be re-opened after a court reversed the KRA order. In 2017, the company won a decade-long court battle against the taxman over a tax bill of KSh1.1 billion (US$110 million).

In August 2019, Keroche Breweries CEO Tabitha Karanja and her husband, the company's chairman Joseph Karanja, were arrested on charges of tax evasion of KSh14 billion (US$140 million). They were accused of mis-declaring excise tax and VAT between 2015 and 2019. They were released on a cash bail of KSh10 million for the CEO and KSh2 million for her husband. The matters were however referred to the Tax Appeals Tribunal, with Keroche Breweries lodging six appeals. The dispute mainly revolved around the manufacture process of the Viena Ice ready-to-drink vodka. The brewer argued that Viena Ice was not a separate product from its Crescent Vodka as all they did was to dilute it. They therefore paid excise on the vodka component of the drink rather than the full diluted product. KRA argued that as a separate product, it should have excise calculated on the total volume. The other issue in contention was the classification of its pineapple based wines. The brewer classified the wines under World Customs Organization HS Code 22.04 as fortified wine. However KRA argued that 22.04, which attracts less duty, is for grapes-based wines only and the pineapple based wined should have been classified under HS Code 22.06, which covers others. The tribunal ruled in favour of Kenya Revenue Authority on all the matters but faulted the tax authority for charging interest while the matter was in court. The matter is in appeal.

=== Sachets ===
Keroche Breweries in its early days, allegedly sold alcohol in cheap sachets. These are controversially believed to have contributed to alcoholism in the central region of Kenya and rural Kenya, before their ban in 2004. The company has indicated that copycats infiltrated the market and copied their brands, leading to their move away from plastic bottles to using glass bottles. Critics have also noted that the companies products have since mainstreamed.

=== Competition with East Africa Breweries ===
The Diageo owned East Africa Breweries is the dominant player in the beer market in Kenya. The diversification of Keroche Breweries into beer-making disrupted the market, forcing EABL to issue two new beer brands targeted at low-income earners in 2013. In 2020, EABL and Keroche Breweries became engaged in a court battle over the use of the brown Euro bottle for selling beer. EABL engraves its name on beer bottles but Keroche does not. The contention is whether bottles engraved by EABL should be used exclusively for EABL products. Keroche has argued that they should be open for use since the bottles are used universally and EABL also uses Keroche bottles to package its beer.
