= Waihiga =

Waihiga may refer to:

- David Waihiga (born 1967), Kenyan politician
- Waihiga Mwaura, Kenya journalist
