= Tigania East Constituency =

Electoral district of Kenya

Tigania East
- constituency for the Parliament of Kenya
- Tigania East Constituency within Meru County

- Meru County within Kenya
- County: Meru
- Population: 72,549
- Area: 511 km^{2} (197.3 sq mi)

Current constituency
- Number of members: 1
- Party: NOPEU
- Member of Parliament: Lawrence Mpuru Aburi
- Wards: 5

Tigania East Constituency is an electoral constituency in Kenya. It is one of nine constituencies of Meru County. The constituency has five wards, all of which elect councillors for the Nyambene County Council. The constituency was established for the 1997 elections.

It was one of four constituencies of the former Meru North District.

== Members of Parliament ==
Elections	MP	Party	Notes
1997	Matthew Adams Karauri	KANU	
2002	Peter Munya	NARC	
2007	Peter Munya	PNU	
2013	Lawrence Mpuru Aburi	ODM	
2017	Josphat Gichunge Kabeabea	PNU	
2022	Lawrence Mpuru Aburi	NOPEU	

== Locations and wards ==
Locations
Location	Population*
Ankamia	17,966
Antuanduru	6,133
Buuri	10,004
Karama	17,584
Kiguchwa	10,306
Micii Mikuru	9,860
Mikinduri East	18,842
Mikinduri West	18,583
Muthara	28,851
Thankatha	20,209
Total	x
1999 census.

Wards
Ward	Registered Voters
Karama	7,756
Kigucwa	6,364
Mikinduri	10,175
Muthara	12,625
Thangatha	10,821
Total	47,741
*September 2005.
