= Susan Kihika =

Kenyan politician

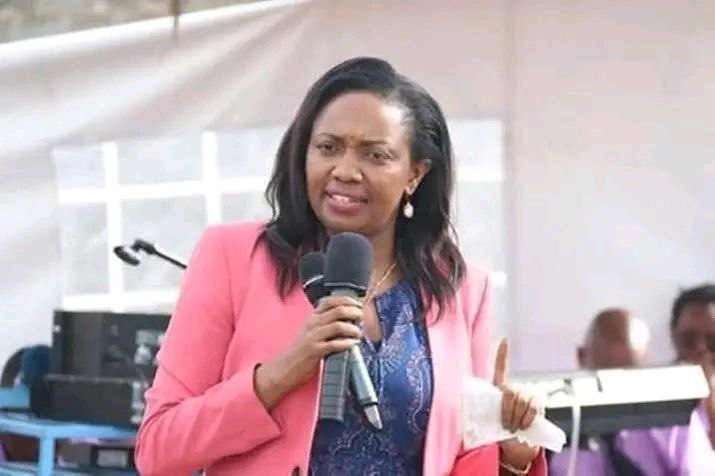
- Kihika in 2019

Governor of Nakuru County
- Incumbent
- Assumed office 25 August 2022
- Deputy: David Kones
- Preceded by: Lee Kinyanjui

Senator of Nakuru County
- In office 31 August 2017 – 25 August 2022
- Preceded by: James Kiarie Mungai
- Succeeded by: Tabitha Karanja

Speaker of the Nakuru County assembly
- In office 22 March 2013 – 2017
- Governor: Kinuthia Mbugua
- Preceded by: Inaugural
- Succeeded by: Joel Maina Kairu

Personal details
- Born: Susan Wakarura Kihika
- Party: UDA
- Education: University of North Texas; Southern Methodist University
- Occupation: Lawyer; politician
- Website: https://susankihika.com/

Susan Wakarura Kihika is a Kenyan lawyer, politician, and the first female governor of Nakuru County. She was also among the seven female Governors that were elected in the 9 August 2022 Kenyan general election against a total 40 male governors, marking significant progress from the three female governors that had been elected in the 2017 elections.

She was elected as a senator in 2017 on the Jubilee Party as a whip. Susan held the position until the May 2020 when she was replaced by Senator Irungu Kang'ata. Prior to that, she served as the first female speaker of the Nakuru County Assembly and held the position of the Vice Chair of the County Assemblies Forum (CAF).

Kihika has been involved in community projects and charity work including supporting women groups across the county. She is a strong advocate for the rights and welfare of children, especially those living with disabilities. Kihika assumed office on 25 August 2022.

== Background and education ==
Alice, her mother, was her father's second wife. Susan attended Busara Forest View Academy in Nyahururu and Bishop Gatimu Ngandu Girls’ High School in Nyeri. She then migrated to the United States around 1992, for further education.

She was admitted to the University of North Texas, graduating with a Bachelor of Arts in Political Science. In 2006, she graduated with a Juris Doctor degree from the Law School of Southern Methodist University, in Dallas, Texas. Subsequently, she was admitted to the Texas Bar, after passing the requisite examinations.

== Career before politics ==
Following her graduation from law school, she worked in the public service. Later she left public service and established The Kihika Law Firm in Dallas, Texas which specialized mostly in representing immigrants. In 2012, after 20 years in the United States, Kihika travelled back to Kenya.

== Political career ==
In 2013, she contested the Bahati Constituency parliamentary seat but lost to Kimani Ngunjiri. She vied for the Nakuru County Speaker’s seat where she defeated 7 opponents to emerge as the first Assembly Speaker of Nakuru County.

In 2017, she contested the Nakuru County senatorial seat and won on a Jubilee Party ticket as the first female Senator of Nakuru County. Kihika’s vision is to see peaceful coexistence within Nakuru County She has also been involved in supporting social issues, economic empowerment initiatives and addressing insecurity

In 2018, Senator Susan Kihika was elected as the first Vice President of the Bureau of the Forum of Women Parliamentarians. In October of the same year, Kihika took over first as the acting President and later as President replacing her predecessor Hon. Ulrika Karlsson.

On 9 August 2022, she stood to be the Nakuru County Governor and won on a UDA ticket. Susan defeated Lee Kinyanjui who was on a Jubilee Party ticket and became the first woman Governor for Nakuru County. She is commonly referred to by her county people as the "Woman of Firsts".

In July 2024, she faced sharp criticism for seeking maternity services abroad. This was after her absence from county duties became public, after which it was confirmed she was on maternity leave. This was termed contrasting her philosophy of women empowerment and making healthcare for all women accessible and of high standard . She later claimed that it would have been inappropriate for her juniors to see her naked.

== Family ==
Kihika was married to Sam Mburu in a traditional wedding on 7 November 2020 in Nyahururu. The ceremony was graced by Dr. William Samoei Ruto, Kenya's president, who also took part in the dowry negotiations. In March 2025 she gave birth to twins, Jonathan and Jayden.

== See also ==
- Parliament of Kenya
