= Tabitha Karanja =

Kenyan businesswoman (born 1964)

Tabitha Mūkami Karanja, MBS
- Born: 29 August 1964 (age 62); Kijabe, Kenya
- Citizenship: Kenyan
- Education: Bachelor of Business Administration and management; MSc Business Administration
- Alma mater: University of Nairobi; Kenya Methodist University
- Occupations: Business person; industrialist; entrepreneur; politician; Senator Nakuru County, Kenya, 2022 - present
- Years active: 1996 - present
- Known for: Leading and ownership of Keroche Breweries; Senator Nakuru County, Kenya, 2022 - present
- Title: Chief executive officer; Keroche Breweries
- Predecessor: Susan Kihika
- Political party: United Democratic Alliance (Kenya)
- Spouse: Joseph Mūigai Karanja
- Children: 4

Tabitha Mūkami Mūigai Karanja is a Kenyan businesswoman, entrepreneur, industrialist and Nakuru County Senator. She is the founder and current chief executive officer of Keroche Breweries, the first large brewery in Kenya owned by a non-multinational company. Keroche Breweries accounts for 20% of Kenya's beer consumption, as of October 2012.

== Early life and education ==
Tabitha was born near Kijabe, in central Kenya. After attending Kenyan schools, she took up employment in the Ministry of Tourism as an Accounting Clerk. She met and married her husband, who owned a successful hardware store in Naivasha town. In 1997, the couple closed the hardware store and went into the wine-making business.

== Career ==
Beginning in 1997, Tabitha Karanja and her husband started making fortified wine, targeting the lower end of the market. In 2007, when the government enacted heavy taxes on locally made wines, her product was priced out of the market. She switched to manufacturing ready-to-drink gin and vodka, which her state-of-the-art factory still makes today. In 2008, she added beer to her repertoire of alcoholic drinks, beginning with a brand called Summit. In 2013, the factory began expansion plans to increase beer production from 60,000 bottles per day to 600,000 bottles per day. The refurbished plant, which cost KSh5 billion (US$55.5 million), was commissioned by Adan Mohammed, the Cabinet Secretary for Industrialization, on 31 March 2015.

In the 2022 Kenyan General Election, Karanja ran for and won the Nakuru County Senatorial seat. Karanja's UDA Party ticket garnered 442,864 votes against her main competitor from the Jubilee Party, Lawrence Karanja's 163,625 votes.

== Personal life ==
Tabitha is married to Joseph Mūigai Karanja and together, they are the parents of four children; James Karanja Mūigai, Anerlisa Mūigai, Edward Mūigai and the late Tecra Mūigai. Joseph Karanja Mūigai serves as the Chairman of Keroche Breweries Limited.

== See also ==
- List of Kenyans by net worth
- Economy of Kenya
