= Nathif Jama Adam =

Kenyan banker, writer, politician

Nathif Jama
- Nadiif Jaamac Aadan; نظيف جامع آدم
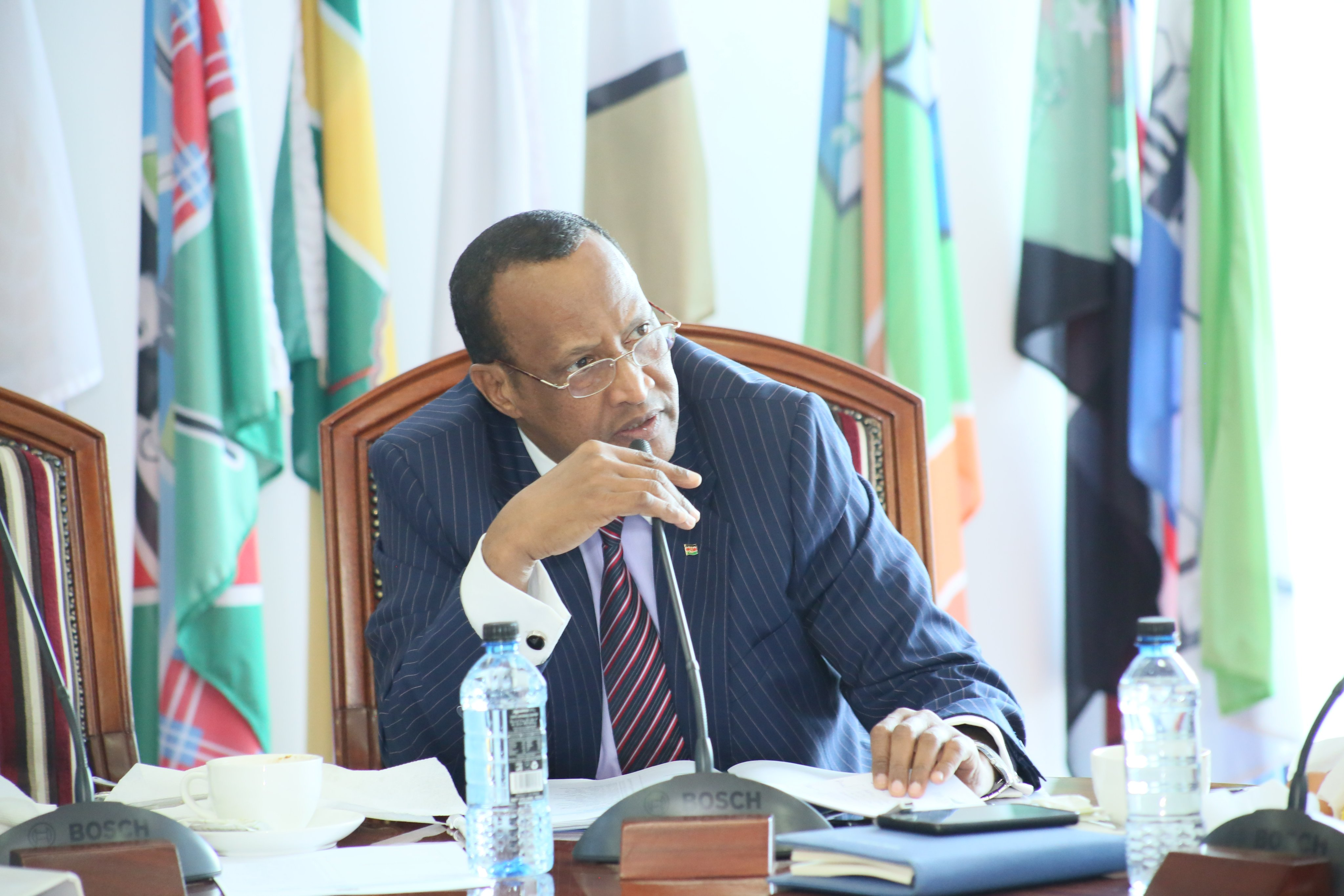

Governor of Garissa County, Kenya
- Incumbent
- Assumed office August 2022
- Preceded by: Ali Korane
- In office March 2013 – August 2017
- Preceded by: Position established
- Succeeded by: Ali Korane

Managing Director of the First Community Bank
- In office 2008–2013

Senior Vice President and Head of the Sharjah Islamic Bank's Investments & International Banking Division
- In office 2002–2008

Personal details
- Born: Garissa, Kenya
- Party: Wiper Democratic Movement – Kenya (until 2022); Orange Democratic Movement (since 2022)
- Education: University of Gloucestershire, Heriot-Watt University
- Profession: Banker; writer; politician

Nathif Jama Adam, EGH, (Somali: Nadiif Jaamac Aadan, Arabic: نظيف جامع آدم) is a Kenyan banker, writer and politician. Adam has served as the governor of Garissa County since August 2022. He was initially not elected to the position in March 2013 to become the pioneer Governor of Garissa County and served until 2017. After failing to win the 2017 elections, he was elected once again in August 2022. Prior to joining politics, he was the Managing Director of First Community Bank. He was also previously a Senior Vice President and the Head of Sharjah Islamic Bank's Investments & International Banking Division. He co-authored the first book on sukuk investments.

== Career ==
=== Banking ===
Adam is an authority on the global Islamic financial industry. He has over two decades of work experience in the Islamic banking, diversified retail, wholesale and investment sectors.

He began his banking career with the Kenya Commercial Bank based in Nairobi. In 1985, Adam joined the Al Rajhi Banking & Investment Corporation in Saudi Arabia. He subsequently worked as an Executive Manager for the Qatar Islamic Bank (QIB), where he oversaw QIB's sizable real estate, leasing, trade and securities foreign investment portfolios.

In 2002, Adam joined the National Bank of Sharjah in the United Arab Emirates. The bank was at the time in the midst of restructuring its services to focus on Islamic banking. Now known as the Sharjah Islamic Bank, Adam served as a Senior Vice President and the Head of its Investments & International Banking Division.

Adam later became the founding managing director of the First Community Bank (FCB) in Nairobi. He was also a member of its board of directors.

Besides executive duties, Adam is an author, frequently writing on Islamic banking and financial issues. He co-wrote the first book on sukuk investments, Islamic Bonds: Your Issuing, Structuring and Investing in Sukuk, published in 2004.

Additionally, Adam has served as a keynote speaker at various finance and Islamic banking conferences and seminars around the world. He also regularly undertakes training courses on different aspects of the industry.

=== Governorship ===
In 2013, Adam ran for Governor of Garissa County. He was elected to the position on 10 March on a Wiper Democratic Movement ticket. In February of the year, Adam also became a member of the Coalition for Reforms and Democracy.

The High Court later upheld his election victory in September 2013. In April 2014, acting on a petition by two plaintiffs citing voting irregularities, the Court of Appeal issued a directive nullifying the result. The Supreme Court overturned the decision the following month, directed the court registrar to prevent the county's assembly speaker from occupying Adam's seat, and barred the IEBC from declaring the governorship vacant until Adam's appeal was heard and ruled within a two-month period. On 9 July, the Supreme Court officially reinstated Adam as Governor of Garissa County.

After failing to win the Garissa gubernatorial seat at the 2017 elections, Adam once again ran for governor in 2022 on an Orange Democratic Movement ticket. He beat incumbent Governor Ali Korane and successfully recaptured the seat.

== Personal life ==
Adam hails from the Aulihan subdivision of the Somali Ogaden Darod clan.

Adam has a masters degree in Islamic Banking, Finance and Management from the University of Gloucestershire, England in addition to an MBA Certification in trade finance module from Heriot-Watt University, Scotland. He also holds the prestigious associateship of the UK Chartered Institute of Bankers.

He is married to Amina Abdullahi.

== Honours ==
At the Jamhuri Day of 2022, Adam was awarded by President William Ruto the Elder of the Order of the Golden Heart (E.G.H.) which is the second highest honour awarded by the Kenyan government.

== Professional memberships ==
- Dubai International Financial Centre (DIFC) Sukuk Development Task Force

== Publications ==
- Islamic Bonds: Your Issuing, Structuring and Investing in Sukuk (2004)
