= Aurelia Chepkirui Rono =

Kenyan public administrator and accountant

Aurelia Chepkirui Rono CBS

Principal Secretary for Parliamentary Affairs
- Incumbent
- Assumed office November 2022
- President: William Ruto
- Minister: Office of the Prime Cabinet Secretary

Personal details
- Education: University of Kabianga (PhD); Jomo Kenyatta University of Agriculture and Technology (MBA); Egerton University (BEd)
- Profession: Accountant; public administrator

Aurelia Chepkirui Rono CBS is a Kenyan public administrator and accountant who serves as the Principal Secretary for the State Department for Parliamentary Affairs in the Office of the Prime Cabinet Secretary (since November 2022). She is a Certified Public Accountant (Kenya) and holds a PhD in Business Administration (Finance).

== Early life and education ==
Rono holds a PhD in Business Administration (Finance) from the University of Kabianga, an MBA (Finance) from JKUAT, and a Bachelor of Education (Science) from Egerton University. She is a Certified Public Accountant (K) and a member of the Institute of Certified Public Accountants of Kenya (ICPAK).

== Career ==
=== Early career ===
Rono has worked in public administration, finance and higher education for more than 15 years, in roles covering budgeting, internal controls and institutional governance. She served as a nominated member of the Bomet County Assembly from 2013 to 2017, chairing the Budget and Appropriation Committee, and has taught Economics, Accounting and Business Finance at Bomet University College, Maasai Mara University and JKUAT.

=== Principal Secretary for Parliamentary Affairs (2022–present) ===
Rono was appointed Principal Secretary in November 2022 following the reorganisation of the national executive. As PS, she coordinates policy between the Executive and Parliament and oversees legislative liaison for the Prime Cabinet Secretary’s office. Initiatives under the docket include capacity-building and improved tracking of the government’s legislative agenda.

== Honours and awards ==
- Chief of the Order of the Burning Spear (CBS) (2023).

== Professional affiliations ==
- Member, Institute of Certified Public Accountants of Kenya (ICPAK).

== See also ==
- Office of the Prime Cabinet Secretary (Kenya)
- Government of Kenya
