= Jane Njeri Maina =

Kirinyaga County Woman Representative

Jane Njeri Maina Hon. MP
- Njeri
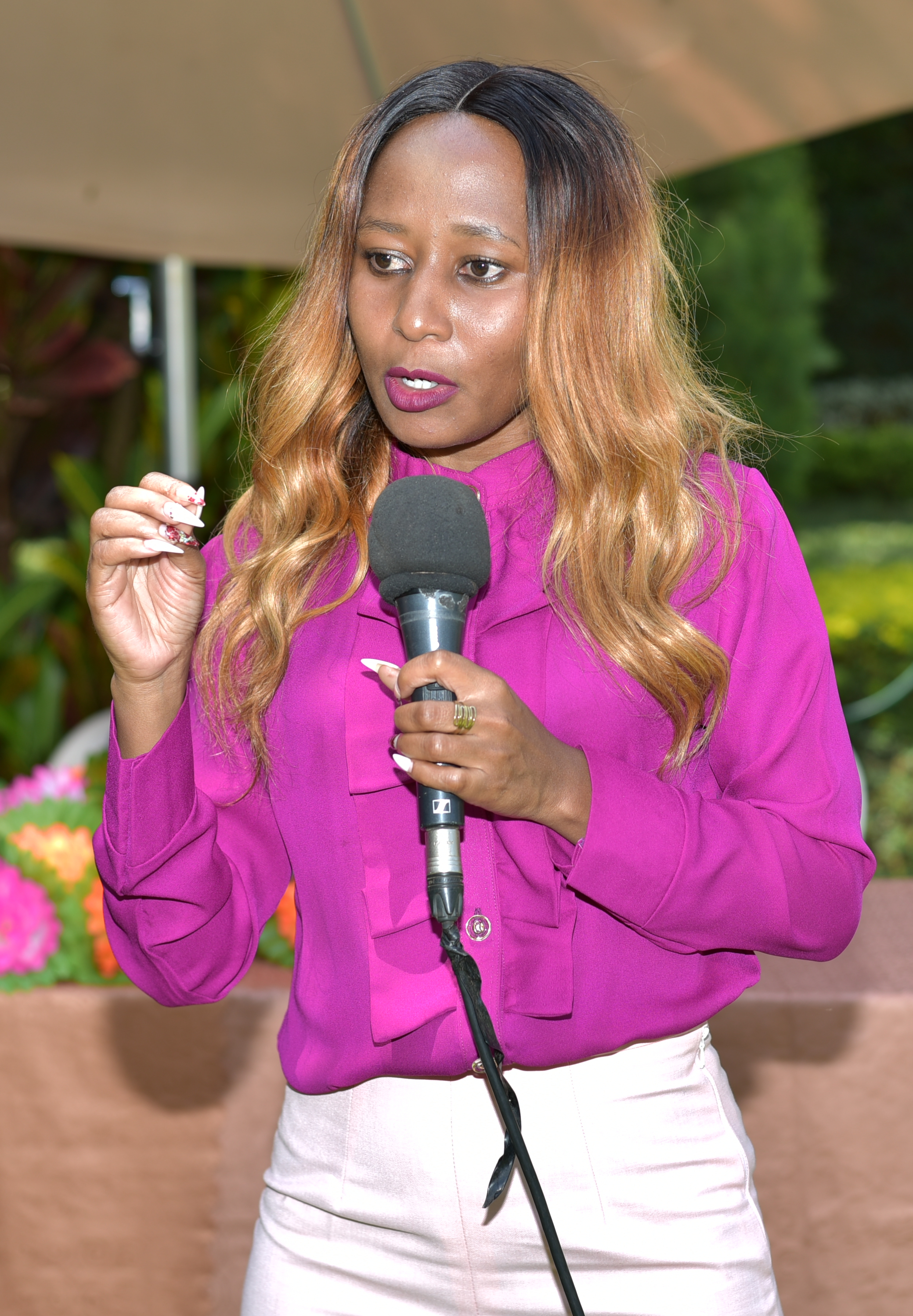
- Jane Njeri Maina

Woman Representative for Kirinyaga County
- Incumbent
- Assumed office 9 August 2022
- Leader: Member of Parliament
- Preceded by: Purity Ngirici
- Majority: 175,001 (74.3%)

Personal details
- Born: Kirinyaga
- Party: United Democratic Alliance (Kenya)
- Education: Kenya School of Law; University of Nairobi; Kenyatta University
- Website: wakilinjeri.com

Jane Njeri Maina is a Kenyan politician who is currently a member of the Kenya National Assembly as Woman Representative for Kirinyaga County. She is a member of the United Democratic Alliance a Kenya Kwanza affiliate party.

== Early life ==
Maina, an Advocate by profession, was born and raised in Kibingoti, Ndia Constituency in Kirinyaga County and attended primary school at Kiangoma Primary School. She then proceeded for her High School education at Kabare Girls.

In 2012, Maina received a certificate in Mandarin from the Kenyatta University.

In 2016, she obtained her Bachelor of Law at the University of Nairobi. In 2017, she completed her postgraduate Diploma in Law at the Kenya School of Law. She was admitted as an advocate of the High Court (Kenya).

== Legal career ==
Maina is the Managing Partner of the Law Firm Njeri Maina Law Advocates and undertakes pro bono cases .

== Political career ==
On April 15, 2022, Njeri Maina clinched the UDA Party ticket after beating former Kirinyaga County Speaker Anne Wangechi and private detective Jane Mugoh.

Maina was elected to the Kenya National Assembly as the Woman Representative for Kirinyaga County in the 2022 general election, representing the United Democratic Alliance at 28 years making her the youngest Member of parliament ever elected in Central Province (Kenya) . She garnered 175,001 votes while Rose Wachira garnered 49,892 votes.

In 2023, she was named among the better-performing women representatives in Kenya. However, women representatives generally did not score highly in the survey, as respondents appeared to favor governors. The list was led by Turkana County’s Cecilia Asinyen, with Njeri ranked second.

During the Kenyan Gen Z protests on the 2024 Finance Bill, Maina voted NO in opposition to the Bill though she was in the minority with the consequence that the Bill passed on June 25th 2024 but, due to public outcry, President Ruto declined to assent to the 2024 Finance Bill and asked for its withdrawal.

2024 Finance bill Votes
YES	NO	SPOILT	ABSTAIN
195	106	2	0

=== Election results ===
General election 2022: Kirinyaga
Party	Candidate	Votes	%
UDA	Jane Njeri Maina	175,001	74.3
Jubilee Party	Rose Wachira	49,892	21.2
NARC	Elizabeth Kamami	10,636	4.5
Majority		175,001	74.3
Turnout			
