= George Wajackoyah =

Kenyan politician

George Luchiri Wajackoyah

Personal details
- Born: c. 1959–61 Mumias, Kenya Colony
- Occupation: politician; educator; legal practitioner

George Luchiri Wajackoyah is a legal practitioner that was based in Nairobi, Kenya, and an independent political campaigner. Wajackoyah was also a presidential candidate in Kenya's 2022 general election held on 9 August 2022. He ran under the Roots Party of Kenya, which supports the legalisation of bhang in Kenya.

He first announced he wanted to run for the presidency in the 2012 general election but withdrew from the race without explanation.

Wajackoya is also the source of the 'Shot in State House' theory in respect of the murder of Dr Robert Ouko, Kenya's minister of foreign affairs who was shot dead near his farmhouse in Koru, Western Kenya, on 13 February 1990.

== Early life ==
Wajackoyah was born in the village of Indangalasia near Mumias, Western Kenya. His date of birth is given variously as 24 October 1959, Uganda at some time in 1960 or 1961 at St Mary's Hospital in Jinja. He belongs to the Luhya community. His father was Tito Olilo Jakoya, and his mother was Melenia Makokha. He was abandoned at 16 years following his parents' divorce and became a street boy in Nairobi, before a well-wisher came to his rescue and paid his secondary school fees.

== Education ==
Between 1969 and 1975, George Wajackoyah studied at the local primary school in Busia township. Between 1976 and 1979, he studied for his O-Levels at the City High School in Nairobi and thereafter went on to study for his A-Levels between 1980 and 1981.

After high school, Wajackoya also graduated as a police officer after studying policing and criminal investigation at Kenya Police Training College in Kiganjo.

He claims to have 17 degrees including the following academic qualifications:

- 1990 – Diploma in French, University of Burundi
- 1996 – Bachelor of Laws (Hons), University of Wolverhampton
- 1997 – Certificate in Comparative Laws/Master of Laws, University of London (SOAS)
- 1998 – Master of Laws in Law in Development, University of Warwick
- 1999 – Certificate in Refugee and Business Law, World University Service (Retas)
- 2002 – LPC (2000–2001), University of Westminster
- 2006 – Master of Laws (U.S. Law), University of Baltimore
- 2006 – Honoris Causa, American Heritage University
- 2014 – Post Graduate Diploma in Law, Kenya School of Law
- 2018 – Ph.D. Candidate, Walden University
- 2020 – MPhil, Walden University
- 2020 – Post Graduate Diploma Student, University of Nairobi

== Career ==
Wajackoyah is also the founding partner of Luchiri &amp; Co. Advocates and has practiced law for at least 25 years.

He is also a criminal justice lecturer at United States International University (USIU).

== Politics ==
George Wajackoyah first announced he wanted to run for the presidency of Kenya in the 2012 general elections but withdrew from the race without explanation.

In June 2022, George Wajackoyah was cleared by the Independent Electoral and Boundaries Commission to be a candidate for the Roots Party of Kenya in Kenya's presidential election held on 9 August 2022. His running mate in the 2022 presidential elections was Justina Wamae, although they later fell out with each other.

In June 2022, the Roots Party presidential candidate launched his manifesto touching on a 10-point agenda. Wajackoyah said that his priority would be to engage in activities that can generate enough income for Kenya in a bid to clear the country's public debt, which is almost hitting Ksh 10 trillion.

Wajackoyah did not take part in the televised 2022 presidential debate that was held on 26 July 2022 because the organisers refused to embrace his preferred format for the debate.

Wajackoya received only 51 votes in his Indangalasia Primary School polling station in Matungu Constituency, Kakamega County while his opponents Raila Odinga and Deputy President William Ruto managed 799 and 109 votes respectively.

== Controversies ==
=== The murder of Dr Robert Ouko ===
Wajackoyah was the source of the 'Shot in State House' theory in respect of the murder of Dr Robert Ouko, a topic he has recently surfaced during his campaign period. At the time Wajackoya alleged that Biwott had shot Ouko in state house as the late President moi watched. The story appeared in The Sunday Times on 26 April 1992 under the headline Moi Watched Cabinet Minister's Execution'.

In the article Wajackoyah alleged that President Daniel Arap Moi, Kenya's then Energy Minister Nicholas Biwott, and the Permanent Secretary in the Ministry of Internal Affairs, Hezekiah Oyugi were directly and personally involved with Ouko's murder which he said occurred at State House in Nakuru. He went on to allege that Biwott had shot Ouko in front of President Moi after Ouko had been 'beaten senseless'. Ouko's body, Wajackoyah said, had then been taken back 90 miles and 'dumped' near the minister's farm house at Koru.

Wajackoya said that he had pieced together his account of the murder from his knowledge from telephone interceptions and Special Branch files for whom, he claimed, he worked for at the time of the murder.

=== Legalization of marijuana in Kenya ===
Wajackoyah has been vocal about legalizing marijuana in Kenya for economic use. He included it in his manifesto saying it will help Kenya manage its ballooning debt. According to the advocate, his government will earn Ksh 3 billion per 1000 acres from growing and exporting marijuana to a readily available market in the US.

=== Snake farming ===
Wajackoyah has said he will promote snake farming so that the venom can be used for medicinal purposes and to promote agriculture.

In June, 2022, the Roots Party presidential candidate launched his manifesto, touching on a 10-point agenda. Wajackoyah said that his priority would be to engage in activities that can generate enough income for Kenya in a bid to clear her public debt, which is almost hitting Ksh 10 trillion.

=== Exporting dog meat ===
Wajackoya also mentioned that if elected as president, he will ensure Kenya starts exporting dog meat, saying that a kilogram of dog meat costs six times more than the price of a kilogram of goat meat.

=== Petition ===
Wajackoya's controversial utterances have seen a petition filed in court to block him from running for presidency on grounds of "mental soundness".

==== Mental Health ====
In July 2022, a Kenyan lawyer, Benard Okello, filed a petition in court to have Wajackoya barred from running for the 2022 general elections on grounds of being "mentally unfit".

Bernard Okello in his petition alleged that Wajackoya's conduct at times puts into question his soundness of mind, adding that his conduct is likely to bring disrepute to the office of the president.
