= Lawrence Mpuru Aburi =

Kenyan politician

Lawrence Mpuru Aburi is a Kenyan politician from the National Ordinary People Empowerment Union (NOPEU). In the 2022 Kenyan general election, he was the only candidate from his party who was elected to the National Assembly, representing the Tigania East constituency in Meru County.

== See also ==
13th Parliament of Kenya
