= National Ordinary People Empowerment Union =

Political party in Kenya

- Abbreviation: NOPEU
- Leader: Mpuru Aburi
- Founded: 2020
- Headquarters: Kenya
- National affiliation: Azimio la Umoja
- Colors: Green
- National Assembly: 1 / 349
- Senate: 0 / 67

Website
- https://nopeuparty.co.ke/

The National Ordinary People Empowerment Union (NOPEU) is a political party in Kenya. It is led by Member of Parliament Mpuru Aburi from Meru County.

== History ==
Rodgers Kipembe Mpuru, the son of former Tigania East Member of Parliament Mpuru Aburi "is among the founders of NOPEU party that mainly aims at giving a platform to the ordinary members of the public seeking to transform the country through elective posts."

The party contested the 2022 Kenyan general election supporting Azimio La Umoja and elected one MP; Lawrence Mpuru Aburi in Tigania East.
