= Agano Party =

Kenyan political party

- Leader: David Waihiga
- Founded: 2006
- Headquarters: Nairobi
- Political position: Right-wing to far-right

Website
- www.aganoparty.com

The Agano Party (lit. 'Covenant' or 'Pledge' or 'Promise' or 'Testament') is a political party in Kenya. It was founded in 2006. The current Party Leader is David Mwaure Waihiga, a lawyer by profession.

== History ==
The party was established in 2002 with the support of Evangelicals, Pentecostals, and Presbyterians, (including Presbyterian Church of East Africa moderator Rev. David Githii), with Christianity Today describing it as a party 'sympathetic to Christian ideals'. Despite this, leadership denied that the party was a 'religious party', although its leader, David Mwaure Waihiga, is an ordained minister.

== Electoral history ==
=== Presidential elections ===
Election year	Candidate	Running mate	Votes	Percentages	Result
2022	David Waihiga Mwaure	Ruth Mutua	31,987	0.23	Lost ✗
