= Nelly Tuikong =

- Born: Kenya
- Citizenship: Kenyan
- Education: Indiana University Indianapolis (Bachelor of Science in Nursing)
- Occupations: Critical Care Nurse, Entrepreneur & Business Executive
- Years active: 2014 to present
- Title: Chief Executive Officer of Pauline Cosmetics Limited

Nelly Tuikong is a Kenyan critical care nurse, entrepreneur and business executive, who is the founder and chief executive officer of Pauline Cosmetics Limited, a Nairobi-based company that she founded in 2013, with business operations in 2014.

== Background and education ==
Nelly was born and raised in Kenya. She is the middle child and only girl in a family of three siblings. She attended Kapsabet Academy Primary School in Nandi County and Eregi Girls Boarding Primary School, in Kakamega County for her elementary schooling. She then transferred to Saint Mary's Tachasis Girls High School, in Nandi County, graduating from high school in 2002.

After high school, Nelly's mother could not afford college fees. Instead, Nelly volunteered at Sally Test Paediatric Centre, in Eldoret. While there, she met Stephen Leapman and his wife Judy Leapman, who volunteered to sponsor her education at Indiana University Indianapolis and to host her while in the United States. She graduated from the Indiana University School of Nursing with a Bachelor of Science in Nursing (BSN) degree.

== Career ==
After college, she started working as a critical care nurse in the state of Indiana, in the United States. However, in 2010, she began to explore the possibility of starting a beauty line of products geared towards African women. With US$400 (approx. Sh40,800), Nelly Tuikong started Pauline Cosmetics (named after her mother). She researched online and approached Kiralee Hubbard, an American makeup artist who owns Eye Max Cosmetics for advice and mentorship. Nelly chose to start with four product lines; lip stick, lip gloss, mascara and eye shadow.

In 2012 she relocated back to her native Kenya and settled in Eldoret. After about three years of making start-up mistakes (she ordered her first large batch of cosmetics before she developed the market), she started to distribute her line through retail outlets in a sustainable manner. As of February 2016, she was supplying to over 40 retail outlets in Kenya, with plans to expand to other East African countries, including Uganda and Rwanda.

== Other considerations ==
In October 2017, Nelly Tuikong was named among "The Top 40 Women Under 40 in Kenya 2017", by Business Daily Africa, an English language business daily newspaper published by the Nation Media Group.

== See also ==
- Esther Koimett
- Catherine Igathe
- Carole Kariuki
