= Polycarp Igathe =

Kenya business executive (born 1972)

Deputy Governor of Nairobi City County
- In office 21 August 2017 – 31 January 2018
- Governor: Mike Sonko
- Preceded by: Jonathan Mwangangi Mueke
- Succeeded by: Anne Kananu

Personal details
- Born: Polycarp Igathe Kamau; 21 September 1972 (age 53) Nairobi, Kenya
- Spouse: Catherine Igathe
- Education: University of Nairobi; Strathmore University
- Occupation: Businessman; corporate executive; politician

Polycarp Igathe Kamau (born 21 September 1972) is a Kenyan businessman, politician and corporate executive, He acts as the Chief Commercial Officer in Equity Group Holdings. He had earlier served as the vice president in charge of sales and marketing at Vivo Energy Africa. Before that, he had served as the Chief Commercial Officer of Equity Bank Kenya between May 2018 and September 2018, when he was later promoted to the managing director position.

Igathe was elected as the second Deputy Governor of Nairobi County in the 2017 Kenyan general elections on a Jubilee Party ticket. Prior to this, he served as managing director of Vivo Energy, Kenya before resigning in May 2017 to run for office. He resigned as Deputy Governor of Nairobi County on 31 January 2018.

Igathe vied for the Nairobi governor position during the 2022 general election under the Azimio-OKA coalition and came second after garnering 573,518 votes compared to UDA's Johnson Sakaja who garnered 699,392 votes.

== Education ==
Igathe obtained a Bachelor of Arts in economics and sociology from the University of Nairobi and is a graduate of the Strathmore University's Advanced Management Program (AMP) with IESE Business School in Spain. At the University of Nairobi, Igathe was the National Chairman of AIESEC in Kenya.

== Career before politics ==
Straight out of the University of Nairobi in 1995, Igathe was employed in Australia as a finance officer at Queensland Health in Australia. He returned to Kenya a year and a half later and took up employment with Coca-Cola, where he worked until 2000. He then joined Africa Online as a sales and marketing manager. He was then hired by Kenya Breweries Limited, working as sales operations manager and then as marketing manager. He then worked as the managing director at Haco Industries for ten years, prior to joining Vivo Energy Kenya in 2003.

Igathe chaired the Kenya Association of Manufacturers from 2012 until 2014. He also chaired the Petroleum Institute of East Africa from 2014 until 2016. Other responsibilities included director and trustee of the Kenya Private Sector Alliance from 2014 until 2016 and chairman and member of the Board of Management of Bishop Gatimu Ngandu Girls High School since 2010.

The President of Kenya appointed Polycarp Igathe to chair the Anti-Counterfeit Agency in 2015, where he served for a year. He was then appointed chairman Special Economic Zones Authority of Kenya in October 2016.

== Politics ==
Igathe was elected to the position of Deputy Governor of Nairobi City County in the 2017 general elections on the Jubilee political party ticket, as Mike Sonko's running mate. He resigned abruptly on 12 January 2018, citing lack of trust from his boss. On 19 April 2022, Igathe announced his candidature to run for the Nairobi gubernatorial seat on Jubilee ticket way late, considering there were three other candidates who are also vying on the same ticket. In 2022, he was nominated to fly the gubernatorial flag for the Azimio-OKA coalition in the August 2022 general election.

== Family ==
He is married to Catherine Igathe, and together they are the parents of three children, one son and two daughters.

== See also ==
- Nairobi
- Counties of Kenya
- List of banks in Kenya
