= Juliana Cherera =

Kenyan Executive (born 1979)

Juliana Whonge Cherera
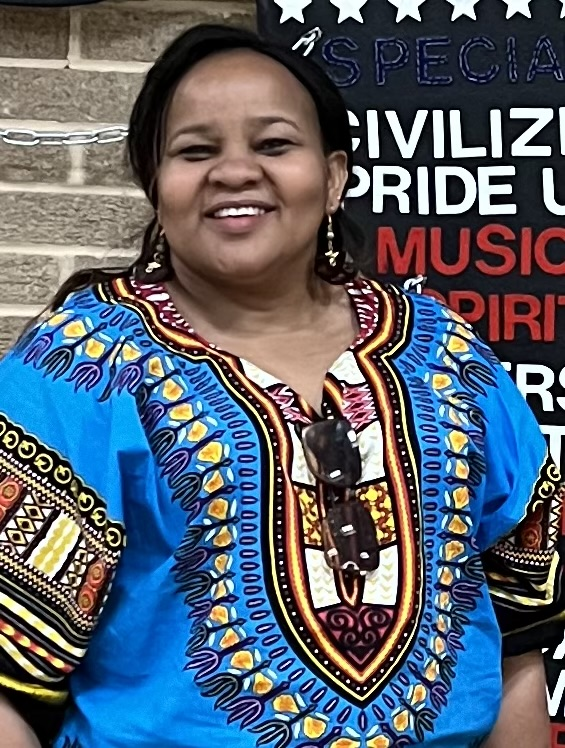
- Born: 26 August 1976 (age 50); Mombasa, Kenya
- Education: Kenyatta University (BA); KEMU (M.Ed.)
- Known for: disowning the 2022 Kenyan general election results announced by the Chairman
- Title: Vice Chair, IEBC

Juliana Whonge Cherera was the Vice Chair at Kenya's Electoral agency IEBC until her resignation on 5th Dec 2022. She became a public subject in Kenya in mid-August 2022 after leading three other commissioners Francis Wanderi, Irene Masit, and Justus Nyang’aya in disowning the 2022 Kenyan general election results read out by Chair Wafula Chebukati terming them to be 'opaque'. The Cherera Four were Dissenting Members. They had a right under Article 17 to request a postponement of the announcement of the results, given that the commission was still within the legal time limits. Commonly referred to as The Cherera Four, history will record that they saw themselves as referees who just wanted the right things to be done right and hence earned no friends on either side of the political divide.

== Career ==
She previously served as the Chief Executive in the Strategic Delivery Unit of the Mombasa County Government, where she had served as Secretary in different portfolios. Before taking up the county jobs, Juliana worked as an Early Childhood Development Education (ECDE) teacher. After University College Cherera to the teacher in primary school because that level of education was devolved. In her estimation, the counties would need university-educated talent to manage and deliver excellent education programs.

She was appointed a commissioner at the IEBC on 2 September 2021 by former President of Kenya Uhuru Kenyatta. She was sworn in 12 days later by Chief Justice Martha Koome at the Supreme Court in Nairobi.

Weeks later, she was unanimously elected as the Vice Chair. She resigned from the position on 5 December 2022, after she, and three others commissioners had been suspended by Kenya's President William Ruto. Following her departure from IEBC, Cherera expressed interest in working with former commissioners on a white paper concerning administrative and legal electoral reforms in Kenya other African countries. The initiative seeks to draw on the experience of former members of electoral management bodies to examine electoral administration, public confidence in election results, and the recruitment and retention of experienced electoral officials.

== Education ==
She attained a Bachelor of Arts (Education) from Kenyatta University with a specialization in Geography and Kiswahili and is a holder of a Master of Education in Leadership and Educational Management from KEMU. She also studied Project Management at the Kenya Institute of Management, Early Childhood Development Education (ECDE) at KNEC, and Strategic Leadership and Development Program at the Kenya School of Government. She is a member of the Kenya Devolution Support Program Committee.
