= Justina Wamae =

Kenyan politician

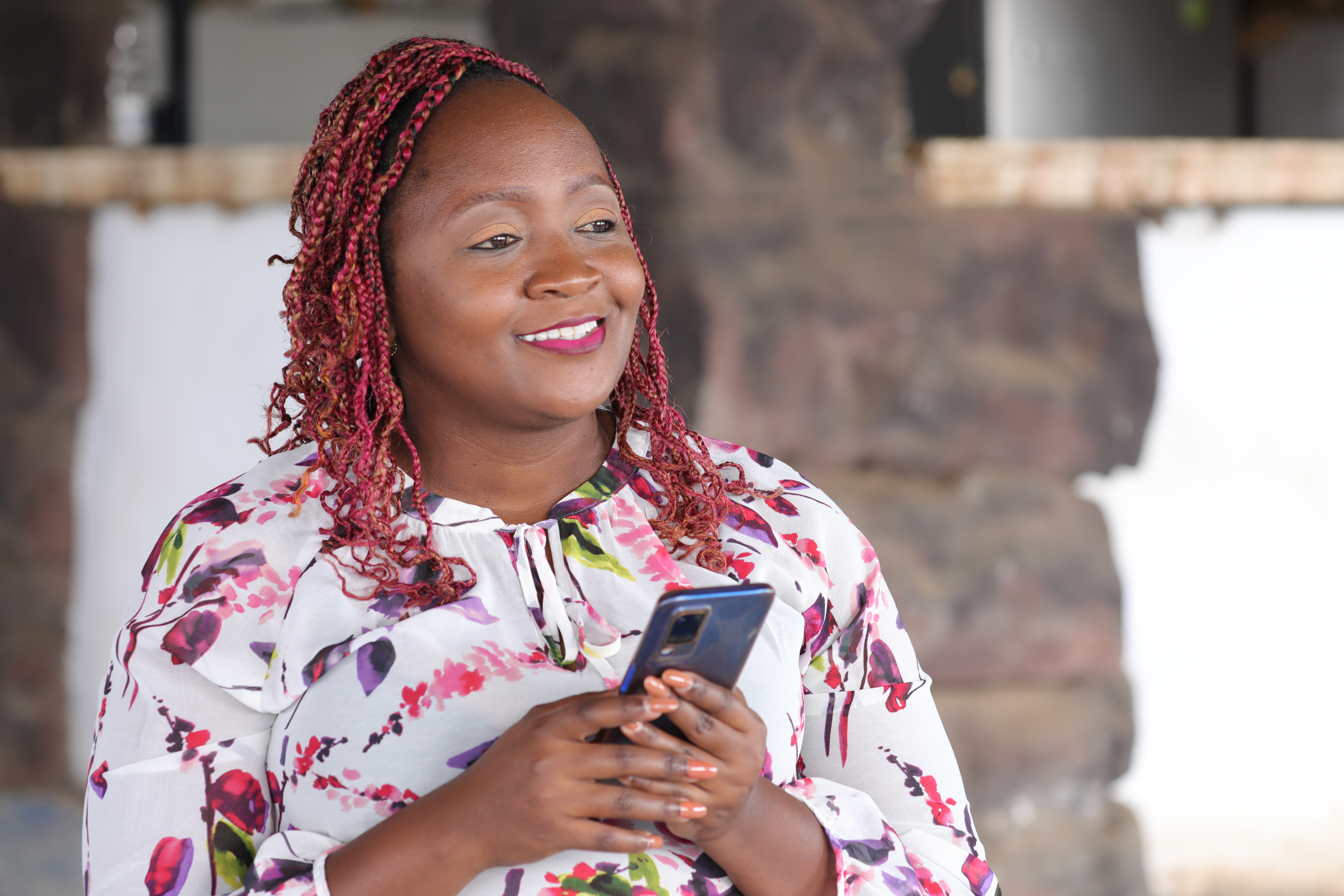
- Born: Justina Wambui Wamae; 25 May 1987 (age 39); Kibera, Nairobi
- Citizenship: Kenya
- Education: Diploma in Purchasing and Supply; Bachelor's of Communications, Management information Systems; Master od Science, Procurement and Logistics
- Alma mater: Daystar University; JKUAT; Chartered Institute of Purchasing and Supply
- Political party: Imarisha Uchumi Party
- Other political affiliations: Roots Party
- Movement: Inatuhusu Movement
- Spouse: Alex Kanyi
- Children: 1

Justina Wamae (born May 25, 1987) is a Kenyan politician and businesswoman. She was the running mate to the presidential candidate, Professor George Wajackoyah, in the 2022 Kenyan general election under the party ticket of the Roots Party of Kenya. In 2017 she contested for the Mavoko Constituency parliamentary seat, where she lost.

== Early life and education ==
She was born and raised in Kibera, Nairobi in a family of three. She started her education in 2001 at Kilimani Primary School for her Kenya Certificate of Primary Education . For her secondary education, she joined Limuru Girls High School for the Kenya Certificate of Secondary Education in 2005.

Justina Wamae graduated with a Bachelor of Commerce degree in Management Information Systems from Daystar University in 2010. In 2012 she earned a diploma in Purchasing and Supply Chain Management from the Chartered Institute of Purchasing and Supply in the United Kingdom. She completed her master's degree in Purchasing and Logistics from Jomo Kenyatta University of Agriculture and Technology in 2014.

== Career ==
Justina Wamae worked as an intern at ICRAF for nine months in 2009 and later joined UNDP Somalia as a procurement intern for 7 months. She left UNDP for InfoSuv Africa as a procurement audit assistant in August 2010 to intern at the Kenya Airports Authority for 4 months. Her time with the British Council was from January 2012. She was a program assistant till March 2012, when she became a program associate and worked till February of 2013.

She also worked for The Platform Kenya Magazine as an OP-ED columnist for a year till 2016 before joining politics. After the 2017 elections, she became the head of operations and strategy at Datum Dredgers KE in Utawala up to April 2022 before resigning to contest as a presidential running mate. She resumed her position in October of the same year and is currently working there.

Justina is the founder of the Inatuhusu Movement, a political and civil society initiative established in October 2022.

=== Political career ===
Her parents moved to Syokimau, Machakos County, from Kibera during the 2007 post-election violence and that is where Justina began her political career. She was the chairlady of the lobby group Warembo Na UhuruRuto from June 2016 to March 2017. She left Warembo Na UhuRuto to contest as an aspirant for the Mavoko constituency member of parliament. She was denied the chance to vie for the party ticket of Jubilee with no party primaries conducted, forcing her to be on an independent ticket. She lost the elections to Patrick Makau on the Wiper Democratic Movement party ticket after getting a vote tally of 1200. After the elections she applied for the principal secretary position of the Jubilee party, but she was not nominated.

On 28 April, presidential candidate George Wajackoyah announced his running mate, Justina Wamae, for the Roots Party. They came third with 61,969 votes. The party summoned her for disciplinary action on August 22, 2022, for undermining the party's constitution and misrepresenting the position of the party.

Justina Wamae was appointed by President William Ruto to an 18-member task force to address human resources for health in a gazette notice dated 5 July 2024. She declined the appointment, giving her motherhood duties affecting her ability to serve her duty on the task force.

On 25th October 2026, Justina declared her presidential bid for the 2027 Kenyan general election while launching her Imarisha Uchumi Party in Utawala, Nairobi.

== Personal life ==
Justina is married to Alex Kanyi and together they have a daughter.
