= Erick Mutai =

Kenyan politician

Governor of Kericho County

Personal details
- Born: 28 December 1983 (age 42)
- Party: United Democratic Alliance (UDA)
- Education: Maseno University, University of Kabianga

Erick Mutai is a Kenyan politician and academic from Embu University. He is the Governor for Kericho County, Kenya.

Erick Mutai was born on 28 December 1983. He is a member of the United Democratic Alliance (UDA) party and an alumnus of Maseno University and the University of Kabianga.
