= Johnson Sakaja =

Kenyan politician (born 1985)

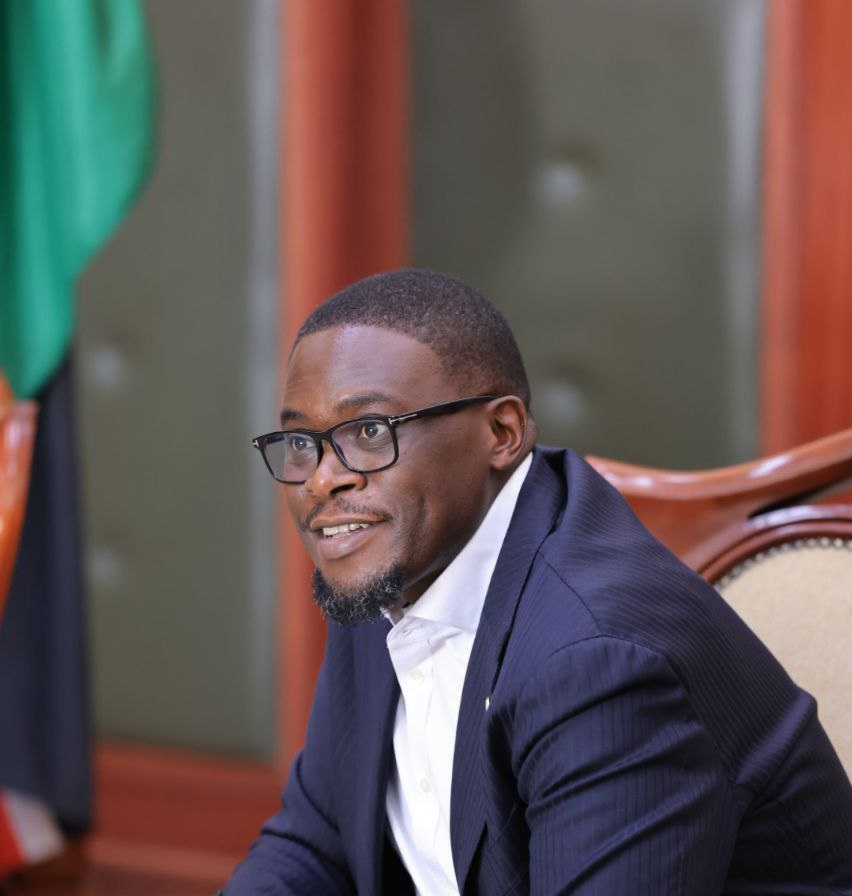
- Sakaja in 2024

4th Governor of Nairobi City County
- Incumbent
- Assumed office 25 August 2022
- Deputy: James Muchiri
- Preceded by: Anne Kananu

Senator of Nairobi City County
- In office 31 August 2017 – 9 August 2022
- President: Uhuru Kenyatta
- Preceded by: Mike Sonko
- Succeeded by: Edwin Sifuna

Personal details
- Born: 2 February 1985 (age 41) Nairobi, Kenya
- Party: United Democratic Alliance
- Occupation: Politician

Johnson Arthur Sakaja CBS (born 2 February 1985) is a Kenyan politician serving as the governor of Nairobi City County since 25 August 2022 elected on a United Democratic Alliance ticket. Previously, he served as the Senator of Nairobi from 2017 to 2022, and as a nominated Member of the National Assembly from 2013 to 2017. He was nominated to Parliament by The National Alliance (TNA) party which was part of the ruling Jubilee Coalition (now Jubilee Party). He was the National Chairman of The National Alliance (TNA) until 9 September 2016 when the party merged with 12 others to form the Jubilee Party.

== Career ==
=== Politics ===
Sakaja was elected as the Chairman of the Student Organisation of Team University (SOTU) while studying at the Team University. However, there are speculations he never graduated from TEAM university.

After the 2008 post-election crisis, he contributed to the formulation of the 2010 constitution where he made submissions on the definition of constituency boundaries. At the age of 24, Sakaja helped form The National Alliance (TNA) of which he became the chairman. This was the party that the former Kenyan president Uhuru Kenyatta rode to electoral victory in 2013.

As Senator for Nairobi, Sakaja participated in law making, allocation of national revenue and exercising oversight over national revenue allocated to the county government. He also served as the Chairperson of the Kenya Young Parliamentarians Association, a parliamentary caucus responsible for advocacy of youth empowering policies and legislation as well as mentorship of youth leaders. Sakaja co-authored a book in collaboration with the Kenyan Section of the International Commission of Jurists on Representation and Fiscal Decentralization. He served as the Chairperson of the Committee of Labour and Social Welfare, a standing Committee which deals with matters pertaining manpower and human resource planning, gender, cultural and social welfare, national heritage, betting, lotteries, sports, public entertainment, public amenities and recreation.

==== Parliament ====
Sakaja was seconded by TNA to the National Assembly as one of its three nominated MPs. In the National Assembly, Sakaja was seconded by Jubilee Coalition to the House Business Committee, the Joint Committee on National Cohesion and Equal Opportunity and Departmental Committee on Finance, Planning and Trade. He is currently the Chairman of the Joint Committee on National Cohesion and Equal Opportunity. Sakaja is also the Chairman of Kenya Young Parliamentary Association which is a caucus made up of MPs who are below 35 years of age.

In his role at Parliament, Sakaja has sponsored bills which the president assented to:

- Public Procurement and Asset Disposal Act, 2015 –which essentially provides for "30% Procurement Reservation Criteria" for Youth, Women and Persons with disability.
- The National Youth Employment Authority Bill, which creates a The National Employment Authority that shall actively seek opportunities for all the jobseekers in its database both locally and internationally, and prepare them for those opportunities through capacity building programs.
- The Private Security Regulation Bill, which provides for a framework for cooperation between private security companies and the national security organs
- The Disaster Risk Management Bill, providing for a more effective organization of disaster risk management and mitigation, of preparedness for, response to and recovery from emergencies and disasters

==== Nairobi Senatorial race 2017 ====
In 2017 Sakaja stepped out of the Gubernatorial race and opted to go for the Senator seat.

==== 2022 Nairobi gubernatorial race ====
In November 2021, Sakaja declared his interest to vie for Nairobi City Governor's seat in the 2022 Nairobi gubernatorial election. He was subsequently cleared by the IEBC to run for the seat on 7 June 2022. His clearance by IEBC has however remained a point of contention since there is doubt about his academic qualifications. Mr Sakaja won the gubernatorial election with 699,392 votes, while his Jubilee Party opponent Polycarp Igathe got 573,516 votes.

Sakaja is deputized by James Njoroge Muchiri who had been serving as Absa Bank Kenya Ltd Chief Operating Officer. They were sworn into office on 25 August 2022 at Kenyatta International Convention Centre (KICC). In attendance was the President of Kenya William Ruto among other guests.

== Awards ==
In 2016, Sakaja was awarded the African Achievers Award Change-maker of the year. Later in the year, he also won the Jacob Well Award (Men Impacting Differently).

== Membership and association ==
- Chairman Kenya Young Parliamentarians Association
- Chairman of the Committee on Labor and Social Welfare
- Vice Chairman of the Committee on National Security, Defense and Foreign Relations
- Patron of Kenya Professional Boxing Commission
- Executive Member Kenya National Private Security Workers Union
- Patron of AFC Leopards Football Club
- Member of the Liaison Committee in the National Assembly

== Controversies ==
Sakaja's political career has included several controversies and allegations of corruption.

=== Revoked degree ===
While Sakaja claimed to have graduated from the University of Nairobi with Bachelor of Science in Actuarial Science, UON stated in a letter that he had yet to graduate. Sakaja later claimed he had a Degree in Management from Team University in Uganda. On 29 June 2022, the Kenyan Commission for University Education declared Sakaja's Team University degree had been revoked. The lack of firm evidence of Sakaja's higher education achievements calls into question whether he is qualified to serve as Governor of Nairobi. Close friends of the Governor say that he holds no education certificates past Kenyan High School, and questions remain about the actual high school he claims to have attended. In July 2022, the High Court dismissed a petition challenging the validity of Sakaja's academic qualifications due to lack of evidence.

=== Kemsa scandal ===
In December 2020, Sakaja was adversely mentioned in a Sh. 7.8 billion KEMSA scandal. Documents tabled in Parliament revealed that the lawmaker received kickbacks from Shop N Buy. A Kenyan official, Charles Juma, who acted as procurement director at KEMSA, alleged that Sakaja pressurized Kemsa CEO Jonah Manjari to award a commitment letter for Shop N Buy.
