= Justus Nyang'aya =

Social Development Professional (born 1957)

Justus Abonyo Nyang'aya
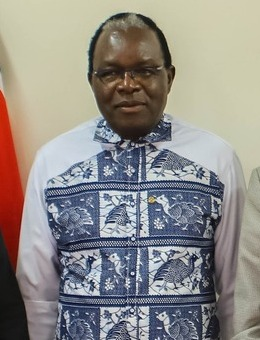
- Pictured in 2022
- Born: 1957 (age 68–69); Homa Bay, Kenya
- Citizenship: Kenya
- Education: United Nations University; Diploma; University of London; Master of Arts
- Known for: Advocacy, Human Rights, governance, Conflict Transformation
- Title: Commissioner, IEBC

Justus Abonyo Nyang'aya is a social development professional and human rights activist who served as a Commissioner at Kenya's Electoral Agency IEBC till 2 December 2022. He chaired the Information and Communication Technology committee.

He is one of four commissioners besides Juliana Cherera, Irene Masit, and Francis Wanderi who disavowed the 2022 Kenyan general election presidential results read out by Chair Wafula Chebukati.

== Career ==
Justus Nyang`aya was a Peace Education Expert with UNESCO-PEER for a year until 1988 before acting as a Refugee Education Counsellor at Windle Charitable Trust for 27 months from March 1988.

He was the chief executive officer at Inter Sudanese Consultations on Peace & Justice (ISCOP) for a year from 2004. From mid-2009 he served as the Country Director for Amnesty International for over eight-and-a-half years before moving on to become the chief executive officer at Leadership Education For Africa Development (LEAD Africa) in Jan 2018 where he worked for just under four years before being appointed a commissioner at the IEBC on 2 September 2021 on a full-time basis. He resigned on 2 December 2022.

== Education ==
Justus did his 'A' levels at Kanunga High School in Kiambaa, Kiambu County. He holds a Diploma in Leadership, Governance, Peace and Conflict Transformation and Organizational Leadership from the United Nations University, (Jordan) as well as a Master of Arts (Education) from the Institute of Education, University of London.
