= Ahmed Abdullahi =

Ahmed Abdullahi may refer to:

- Ahmed Abdullahi (governor) (born 1945), Nigerian military administrator and governor
- Ahmed Abdullahi Gulleid (born 1953), Somali writer and researcher
- Ahmed Abdullahi (footballer) (born 2004), Nigerian footballer
