= Jonathan Bii =

Kenyan politician

Governor of Uasin Gishu County
- Incumbent
- Assumed office 8 September 2022
- Preceded by: Jackson Mandago

Personal details
- Born: 8 August 1968 (age 58) Kenya
- Party: United Democratic Alliance

Jonathan Bii Chelilim commonly known as Koti Moja is a Kenyan politician. He is currently the second governor of Uasin Gishu County, elected into office during the 2022 Kenyan general election.

He is a member of the United Democratic Alliance, an affiliate of the Kenya Kwanza which is the ruling coalition in Kenya
