= 2013 Lamu local elections =

Local elections in Kenya

Local elections were held in Lamu County in Kenya, to elect a Governor and County Assembly on 4 March 2013. Under the new constitution, which was passed in a 2010 referendum, the 2013 general elections were the first in which Governors and members of the County Assemblies for the newly created counties were elected. They will also be the first general elections run by the Independent Electoral and Boundaries Commission (IEBC) which has released the official list of candidates.

== Gubernatorial election ==
| Candidate | Running Mate | Coalition | Party | Votes |
|---|---|---|---|---|
| Abdalla, Timamy Issa | Mugo, Erick Kinyua | | United Democratic Forum Party | -- |
| Swaleh, Swaleh Salim | Somoebwana, Sufyan Yusuf | | Alliance Party of Kenya | -- |
| Twaha, Fahim Yasim | Ndungu, Raphael Munyua | Jubilee | The National Alliance | -- |
| Waihiga, David Mwaure | Nganga, Francis Waweru | | Agano Party | -- |

== Prospective candidates ==
The following are some of the candidates who have made public their intentions to run:

- Fahim Twaha - Lamu West MP
- Issa Timamy - former head of the National Museums of Kenya
- Engineer Swaleh Imu - former Electricity Generation Manager at KenGen
