= Catherine Igathe =

Kenyan business executive

- Born: Kenya
- Education: United States International University Africa; (Bachelor of Science in Business Administration); Strathmore Business School; (Executive Education); IESE, University of Navarra; (Executive Education)
- Occupation: Business executive
- Years active: 1996 to present
- Title: CEO at AIG General Insurance Limited
- Spouse: (Polycarp Igathe)

Catherine Igathe is a Kenyan business executive, who works as the managing director and chief executive officer of AIG Kenya Insurance Company Limited.

== Background and education ==
She has a Bachelor of Science degree in Business Administration, awarded by United States International University Africa, in Nairobi. She then graduated from the Advanced Management Program of Strathmore Business School, also in Nairobi. She is also a graduate of the IESE Business School, in Spain.

== Work experience ==
She has long-standing experience in the insurance industry going back nearly 25 years. At one time she served as the general manager in charge of distribution at AIG Kenya. Later, she was promoted to Acting Managing Director, serving in that capacity for six months, before she was confirmed as CEO.She is a former CEO at Jubilee General Insurance Kenya (now Jubilee Allianz General Insurance Ltd)

== Other considerations ==
In 2016, Catherine Igathe was appointed as a non-executive director of Centum Investments, a Kenya-based publicly traded investment company, whose stock is listed on the Nairobi Stock Exchange and on the Uganda Securities Exchange.

== Family ==
She is married to Polycarp Igathe, and together are the parents of three children, one son and two daughters.

== See also ==
- Sauda Rajab
- Nelly Tuikong
