= Alcohol sachet =

Small pouch containing an alcoholic beverage

An alcohol sachet is a small sealed soft plastic pouch containing an alcoholic beverage. They are popular in Africa as a format for inexpensive liquor and have been banned in several African nations due to concerns of public health and civil order.

== Prohibitions ==
Alcohol sachets were banned:

- 2004 in Kenya
- 2015 in Malawi
- 2016 in Cameroon
- 2017 in Tanzania
