= David Waihiga =

Kenyan lawyer

David Mwaure Waihiga
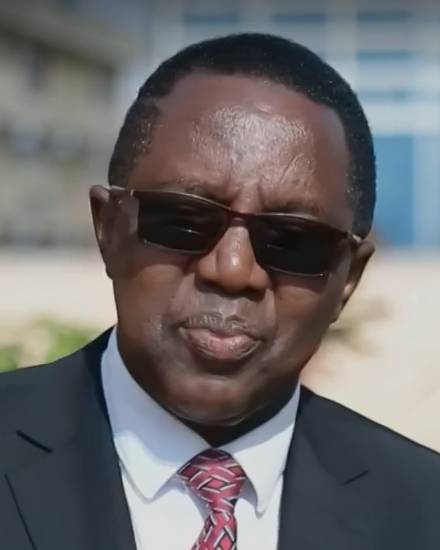
- Mwaure in 2022
- Born: 1967 (age 58–59); Nairobi, Kenya
- Education: University of Nairobi
- Occupations: lawyer; politician; priest
- Employer(s): MWA Advocates LLP; Mwaure & Mwaure Waihiga Advocates
- Political party: Agano Party
- Spouse: Justice Anna Ngibuini Mwaure
- Children: 3
- Website: Official website

David Mwaure Waihiga (born 1967) is a Kenyan Lawyer. He is also a leader of the Agano Party.

== Political career ==
Mwaure was a candidate for Governor in the 2013 Lamu local elections.

He was a candidate for President of Kenya in the 2022 general election. with Ruth Mucheru as his deputy running mate. He launched his 12-point manifesto on 4 July 2022. He argued that it's time for the country to move forward and start in a new slate in terms of leadership. He envisages his leadership to pledge alliance to the constitution; his pledge to family, women, youth, persons living with disability, county governments, workers, business owners, the economy, religious institutions, the environment, as well as a pledge to the international community. He also promised to recover public monies stashed in offshore accounts as well as dissolve the Nairobi City County government.

He conceded defeat in the presidential election on August 14, and endorsed William Ruto.
