= Ahmed Abdullahi Gulleid =

- Born: January 1, 1953 (age 73)
- Citizenship: Somali
- Occupations: Columnist; Writer

Ahmed Abdullahi Gulleid (Somali: Axmed Cabdullaahi Guuleed, Arabic: احمد عبد الله جوليد) (born 1953), also known as "Aag", is a Somali writer and researcher.

Gulleid was born in the town of Garbahaarreey in the southern Gedo region of Somalia. He attended school locally before relocating to Mogadishu to continue his studies.

In 1988, while still in college, Gulleid began attracting attention for publicly (in the print media) questioning the legality and actions of Somalia's Kacaanka 21 Oktoobar (October 21 revolution). As a result, he was imprisoned and subsequently deported. He later studied in Canada, the United Kingdom, and Yemen.

== Career ==
Gulleid is a syndicated writer and columnist on many current issues regarding Somalia, including opposition to Somalia's armed Islamists. The last article that Gulleid published online attracted as many as 200,000 readers and over 3,400 comments.

Gulleid lives and works in the United Arab Emirates. His most recent book, titled Somalia: A Reciprocal Curse?, was released in January 2009.
