= Purity Wangui Ngirici =

Kenyan politician

Women Representative for Kirinyaga County
- In office August 2017 – September 2022
- Preceded by: Winnie Karimi Njuguna
- Succeeded by: Jane Njeri Maina

Personal details
- Born: 1978 (age 47–48) Kirinyaga County, Kenya
- Party: DCP
- Education: Bachelor's degree in Commerce
- Alma mater: London University
- Occupation: Politician, businesswoman

Hon. Purity Wangūi Ngìricì (born 1978) was the second Women Representative of Kìrìnyaga County. She came into office in August 2017 after the 8th August general elections. She was elected into office with a Jubilee Party ticket replacing the first Kìrìnyaga Woman Representative Hon. Winnie Karìmi Njūgūna.

== Early life and education ==
Ngìricì was born in 1978 and raised in Kìrìnyaga county. She holds a bachelor's degree in commerce from a London University. She is also a businesswoman. She was elected as the Kenya Women Parliamentary Association (KEWOPA) chairperson.

== Electoral history ==
In 2017, Ngirici was elected the County Woman Representative for Kirinyaga County, representing the Jubilee Party, beating the independent incumbent Winnie Karimi Njuguna. In the 2022 elections, she lost the nomination for the United Democratic Alliance (UDA) against the incumbent Anne Waiguru in her bid for governor of Kirinyaga County. Ngirici proceeded to run as an independent against Waiguru, but was defeated by a margin of 7411 votes.

== Political career ==
After being elected in 2017, Ngirici was also elected as the chairperson for the Kenya Women Parliamentary Association (KEWOPA). However, on 7 July 2020, 65 of 97 KEWOPA MPs voted to eject Ngirici from the position, voting in Gathoni wa Muchomba, the County Woman Representative of Kiambu County.

Ngirici has switched political party affiliation multiple times throughout her political career. Ngirici began her political career in 2017, defeating the incumbent Winnie Karimi Njuguna for the Jubilee Party nomination. Some time between 2017 and 2021, she left the Jubilee Party, looking towards the UDA for her future political career. On 29 December 2021, Ngirici announced that she would be leaving the ruling UDA to run as an independent in the 2022 Kirinyaga governor elections. Later in 2022, Ngirici joined the Jubilee Party in her bid for governor of Kirinyaga. On 14 April 2022 she left the Jubilee Party to run as an independent in the upcoming elections. She was ultimately defeated by the UDA's Anne Waiguru. Some time between 2022 and 2026, Ngirici returned to the UDA, though the details remain unknown.

In 2023, she was elected the chair of the Board of Kenya Seed Company Limited. On 29 April 2026, Ngirici announced that she would once again be parting with the UDA. A day later, she was removed from her position as Director and Chairperson of the Board of Kenya Seed Company Limited. Later in 2026, she announced that she was joining the Democracy for Citizens Party (DCP) to run for governor in the 2027 elections.

== Personal life ==
Purity Wangui Ngirici is married to her husband, Andrew Ngirici.
