= Lee Kinyanjui =

Cabinet Secretary Ministry of Investments Trade and Industry

Cabinet Secretary-Ministry of Investments, Trade and Industry Kenya
- Incumbent
- Assumed office 17 January 2025

2nd Governor of Nakuru County
- In office 21 August 2017 – 25 August 2022
- Deputy: Dr Erick Korir
- Preceded by: Kinuthia Mbugua
- Succeeded by: Susan Kihika

Assistant Minister of Roads
- In office 2008–2013
- President: Mwai Kibaki
- Prime Minister: Raila Odinga

Nakuru Town Constituency Member of Parliament
- In office 15 January 2008 – 28 March 2013
- President: Mwai Kibaki
- Preceded by: William Kariuki Mirugi
- Succeeded by: Constituency abolished

Personal details
- Born: Lee Maiyani Kinyanjui; 1972 (age 53–54) Nakuru, Kenya
- Party: Jubilee Party of Kenya
- Education: Kenyatta University; University of Nairobi

Lee Maiyani Kinyanjui is a Kenyan politician, currently serving as the Cabinet Secretary in the Ministry of Investments, Trade and Industry (MITI). He is the second and immediate former governor for Nakuru County.

== Early years and education ==
He is a graduate of Kenyatta University where he graduated in literature and later pursued a master's degree in business administration at the University of Nairobi.

== Career ==
Lee Kinyanjui belongs to the Jubilee Party and was elected to represent the Nakuru Town Constituency in the National Assembly of Kenya since the 2007 Kenyan parliamentary election. In 2013, he unsuccessfully vied for the Nakuru gubernatorial seat, losing to Kinuthia Mbugua. He vied for the second time, for the same seat, in 2017, trouncing Governor Kinuthia Mbugua in Jubilee Party primaries. In August, Lee Kinyanjui was elected as the Nakuru Governor, effectively becoming the second governor of the county. He served as the Assistant Minister for roads and later as the first chairperson of the National Transport and Safety Authority (NTSA). During his tenure at NTSA, he oversaw digitisation of driving licences and logbook acquisition by introducing TIMS. As Nakuru Governor, Kinyanjui has initiated Mega projects including construction of Level 4 hospitals across Nakuru County, upgrade of 73-year-old Afraha Stadium, rehabilitation of rural roads through Boresha Barabara program and upgrade of Lanet Airstrip into an international airport. Kinyanjui is also pushed for Nakuru Municipality into a city, which it is currently.
