= Sharjah Islamic Bank =

Emirati bank

- Native name: مصرف الشارقة الإسلامي
- Formerly: National Bank of Sharjah
- Type: Public bank
- Traded as: ADX: SIB
- ISIN: AES000201013
- Industry: Banking
- Founded: 1975; 51 years ago
- Headquarters: Sharjah, United Arab Emirates
- Number of locations: 29 (2025)
- Key people: Abdulrahman Mohamed Nassir Salem Al Owais (Chairman); Mohamed Abdalla (CEO)
- Products: Finance and Insurance
- Revenue: AED 1,31 billion (2025) (USD 358 million)
- Operating income: AED 2,48 billion (2025) (USD 676 million)
- Total assets: AED 90,3 billion (2025) (USD 24,6 billion)
- Total equity: AED 9,53 billion (2025) (USD 2,6 billion)
- Number of employees: 1710 (2025)
- Website: www.sib.ae

Sharjah Islamic Bank, (Arabic: مصرف الشارقة الإسلامي) formerly known as the National Bank of Sharjah, is a medium-sized Emirati Islamic bank headquartered in the Emirate of Sharjah in the United Arab Emirates.

The bank provides Sharia-compliant products and services to serve individuals, companies, institutions, and investors. As an Islamic bank, SIB operates in accordance with the principles of Sharia law.

== History ==
The bank was established in 1976 and in 2004 converted into a fully Shariah compliant bank.

In August 2021, Sharjah Islamic Bank announced the launch of a new digital account that allows customers use the smart bank application to open an electronic account without the need to visit the branch.

== Financial performance ==
For the year 2022, Sharjah Islamic Bank (SIB) has posted net profit of DH 650.9 million.

== See also ==
- Islamic banking
- Sharia investments
