= Anne Kananu =

Kenyan politician

Ann Kananu Mwenda
- Born: May 1980 (age 46); Embu County, Kenya
- Education: Dedan Kimathi University of Technology (Bachelor of Science in Criminology and Security Management); St. Paul's University, Limuru (Diploma in Criminology and Security Management)
- Occupations: Criminologist, politician, public administrator
- Years active: Since 2002
- Known for: Politics, public administration
- Title: Former Governor of Nairobi County
- Predecessor: Mike Sonko
- Successor: Sakaja Johnson

Ann Kananu Mwenda is a Kenyan criminologist, politician and public administrator who, from 16 November 2021 until 2022, served as the Governor of Nairobi County.

From 15 January 2021 until 16 November 2021, she served as the substantive Deputy Governor of Nairobi County.

She also served as the Acting Governor after the December 2020 impeachment and removal from office of Mike Sonko. In keeping with Kenyan laws, Kananu served out the remaining term of the previous governor.

== Background and education ==
Ann Kananu was born in May 1980, in Embu County. She attended St. Michael Primary School, in her home county, before joining Our Lady Of Mercy Girls Secondary School, Magundu, an all-girls boarding school in Tharaka Nithi County, administered by the Catholic Church. She graduated from there with the Kenya Certificate of Secondary Education (KCSE) in 1999.

She holds a Bachelor of Science degree in Criminology and Security Management, awarded by Dedan Kimathi University of Technology in 2016. She also holds a Diploma in Criminology and Security Management, obtained from St. Paul's University, Limuru, in 2013. In addition, she holds two certificates obtained from the University of Nairobi, between 2011 and 2012; the first, a Certificate in Human Resource Management and the second a Certificate in Public Relations. Her other qualifications include a Certificate in Crisis Management from AVSEC and a Female Screening Training Certificate obtained from the US Department of Homeland Security.

== Career ==
Anne Kananu Mwenda has a varied career history dating back nearly twenty years from the date she took the helm at Nairobi County Local Government. From 2002 until 2003, she served as a Customer Service Representative and then as Personal Assistant to the CEO, at Mokir Enterprises Limited. She was then hired by H. Mogambi and Company Advocates, working there as a personal assistant, from 2003 until 2004.

Later, she took up employment with Kenya Airports Authority as the Security Supervisor responsible for Quality Control and Training. In May 2018, Kananu Mwenda was hired by Nairobi City Hall as the Chief Officer in charge of Disaster Management and Coordination. This was her role until she was sworn in as Deputy Governor in January 2021.

== Personal ==
In the past, Ann Kananu Mwenda was married to the late Philip Njiru Muthathai who died in a road traffic accident in January 2019.
