= Ali Korane =

Kenyan politician

Ali Bunow Korane

Former governor of Garissa County
- In office August 2017 – 2022
- Preceded by: Nathif Jama Adam

Personal details
- Born: Ali Bunow Korane Balambala, Garissa
- Party: Jubilee Party

Ali Bunow Korane is the former governor of Garissa County, Kenya. He assumed the office in August 2017 as the 2nd incumbent governor of Garissa after the 2017 general election.

Korane was born in Balambala, Garissa. He is from a Somali Muslim family. He obtained his Bachelor and Masters of Art in International Studies and Diplomacy both from George Washington University.

Korane joined the Kenya Army as a 2nd lieutenant and was posted to the 50 Air Cavalry Battalion. He was later trained as a helicopter pilot on the McDonnell Douglas MD 500 Defender anti-tank helicopter.

== Administrative work and politics ==
After retirement from the army he joined the Provincial Administration where he later served as a permanent secretary in three ministries: the Ministry of Tourism and Information, Ministry of Home Affairs and Ministry of Sports. Korane was also the special envoy to the Horn of Africa in 2010 after he was assigned the post by President Uhuru Kenyatta to coordinate peace in the country.
