= Wisley Rotich =

Kenyan politician

Governor of Elgeyo Marakwet County
- Incumbent
- Assumed office 8 September 2022
- Preceded by: Alex Tolgos

Deputy Governor of Elgeyo Marakwet County
- In office 2017 – 22 August 2022
- Preceded by: Dr Gabriel Lamaon
- Succeeded by: Prof Grace Cheserek

Personal details
- Born: 1 January 1986 (age 40) Kenya
- Party: UDA

Wisley Rotich is the second governor of Elgeyo Marakwet County, Kenya, Kenya. He was elected on 9 August 2022 to succeed the outgoing governor Alex Tolgos, Kenya, who had served his two terms.
