= Kinuthia Mbugua =

First governor of Nakuru

Governor
- In office 2013 – August 2017
- President: Uhuru Kenyatta
- Vice President: William Ruto
- Deputy: Joseph Ruto
- Succeeded by: Lee Kinyanjui

Personal details
- Born: Kiambu, Kiambu County, Kenya
- Party: TNA; Jubilee Alliance

Kinuthia Mbugua is the first and immediate former governor of Nakuru County in Kenya. Nakuru Governor Kinuthia Mbugua was trounced by his close rival Lee Kinyanjui in a closely contested nomination. Kinyanjui was declared winner with 223,583 votes against Mbugua's 139,784 with 10 out of 11 constituencies tallied. He has had an illustrious career in the Civil Service in 1978 as a District Officer and served extensively throughout the country rising to become a District Commissioner in Nakuru.

== Political career ==
Mbugua has been dealing with ongoing doctor strikes, a youth spark plan, opening Nakuru's 1st Afro-Asia Expo at WestSide Mall and more of other contributions to his county government. His first political job was to be a District Officer and a District Commissioner at Central and Rift Valley Provinces. Some of his contributions have brought on his attacks; like the toilet controversy. Kenyans on social media felt the project was a bad idea since it cost the county almost Sh9Million ($86,621) - of taxpayer money!

On December 5, 2016, the country's health sector was not ground breaking enough. This prompted him to declare a state of emergency. According to the Kenyan Television Network, Mbugua said the situation was dire since doctors & nurses went on strike.
