= Team University =

Ugandan university

Coordinates: 00°18′21″N 32°33′43″E

Team University (TU)
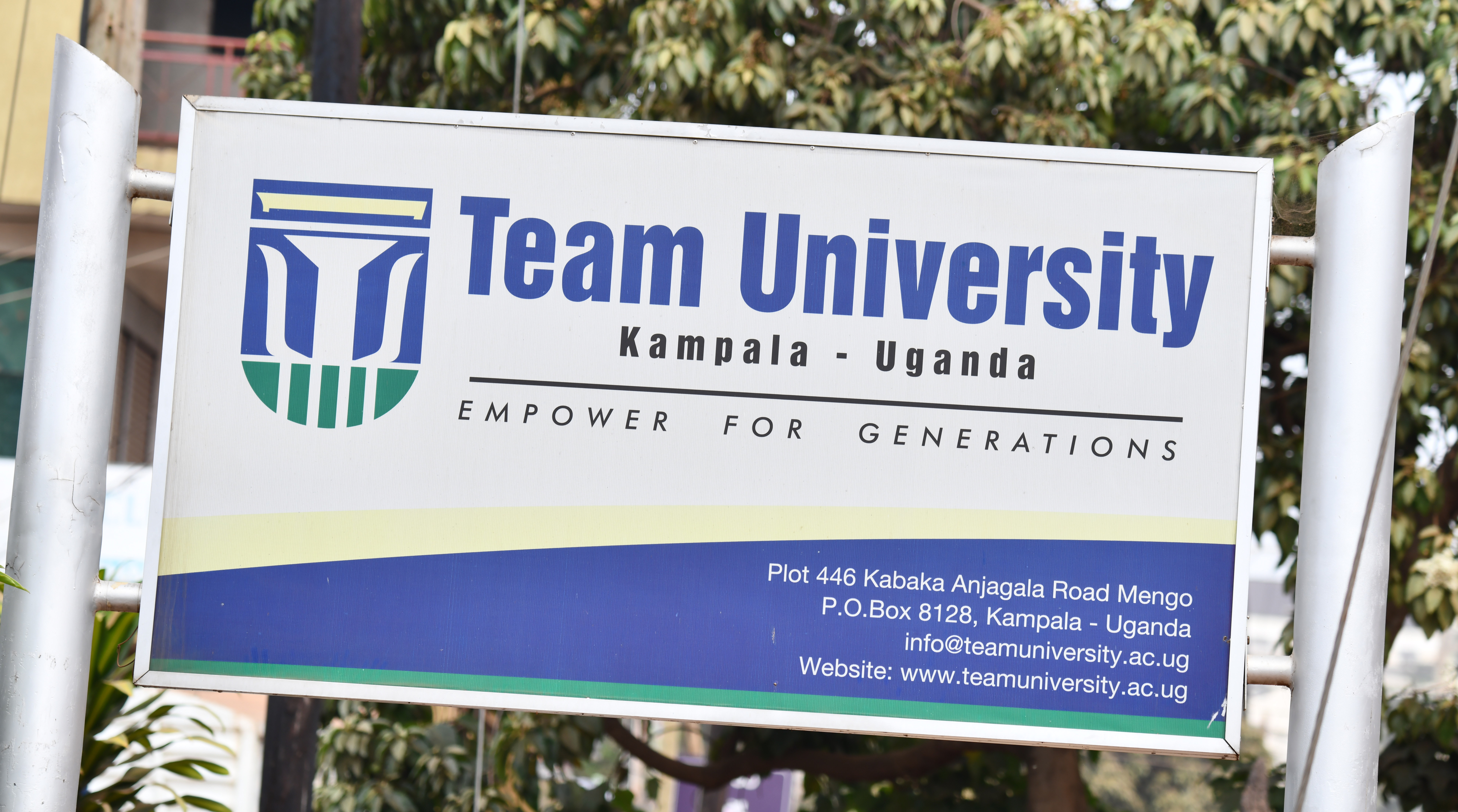
- Motto: Empowering for Generations
- Type: Private
- Established: 2010
- Chancellor: Professor Tasis Kabwegire
- Vice-Chancellor: Professor A.J. Lutalo-Bosa
- Students: 1,200+ (2017)
- Location: Rubaga Division, Kampala, Uganda
- Campus: Urban
- Website: Homepage

Team University (TU) is a private, co-educational Ugandan university in the Buganda Region of Uganda. It is accredited as a "private university", by the Uganda National Council for Higher Education (UNCHE).

== Location ==
The campus of the university is located in Wood House, at 446 Kabaka Anjagala Road, in Rubaga Division, in Kampala, Uganda's capital and largest city. The geographical coordinates of the campus of Team University are:0°18'21.0"N, 32°33'43.0"E (Latitude:0.305833; Longitude:32.561944).

== Overview ==
In 2001, three Ugandan individuals, namely (a) David Tushabomwe Ndindirize (b) Joseph Kigongo Balikuddembe and (c) Sam Kindyomunda Rugaba established Team Business College. All three are professional accountants and they began by providing training leading to certification by the Association of Chartered Certified Accountants (ACCA).

In 2006, using experience gained from running TBC, the same trio applied to the UNCHE for permission to establish a private university. On 18 December 2007, UNCHE granted them a Letter of Interim Authority to establish Team University. The university was established in October 2010, as a private "Degree Awarding Institution". In 2015, Team University received full accreditation as a private university.

In October 2017, Team University held its fifth graduation ceremony, graduating nearly 400 degree, diploma and certificate students. Team university has since grown and is looking at expansion

== Academics ==
=== Faculties ===
The university maintains the following academic units as of July 2019.

- Faculty of Business and Management
- Faculty of Computing and Information Technology
- Faulty of Humanities
- School of Graduate studies and research
- The Distance Learning Unit.
- Faculty of social sciences
- Faculty of Education
- Faculty of Applied Science

=== Academic courses ===
Postgraduate degree courses

- Master of Science in Finance
- Master of Business Administration (MBA)
- Master of Public Administration and Management
- Master of Science in Procurement and Logistics Management
- Master of Science in Human Resource Management
- Master of Education Planning and Management. (MEPM)

Undergraduate degree courses

- Bachelor of Science in Accounting and Finance
- Bachelor of Business Administration
- Bachelor of Science in Management
- Bachelor of Procurement and Logistics Management
- Bachelor of Administrative and Secretarial Practice
- Bachelor of Information Technology
- Bachelor of Computer Science
- Bachelor of Public Administration and Management
- Bachelor of Social Work and Social Administration
- Bachelor of Human Resource Management
- Bachelor of art in journalism and media studies

Certificate and diploma courses

The university offers certificate and diploma courses at undergraduate and postgraduate levels, in many of the disciplines where degrees are also offered.

== See also ==
- Education in Uganda
- List of universities in Uganda
