= University of Kabianga =

University in Kenya

Coordinates: 0.4458°S 35.1380°E

- Motto: Innovation and Excellence
- Type: Public-private partnership
- Established: 2013
- Chairperson: Dr. Adelaide Mbaika Mbithi
- Vice-Chancellor: Prof. Eric Koech
- Total staff: 195
- Students: 7,000 - 7,999
- Location: Kericho, Kenya
- Website: http://www.kabianga.ac.ke/

The University of Kabianga is located in Kabianga, Belgut constituency, Kericho county in Kenya. The university is situated in the Kabianga Complex, along with the Kabianga Boys High School and Primary School as well as the Kabianga Tea Farm. The Kabianga Complex has a long history.

The institution has three campuses including Kapkatet campus, Kericho Town campus and the campus.

== History ==
The Government School, Kabianga, was started in 1925. Kabianga Teachers’ Training College existed between 1929 and 1963, when the College was moved to the present Kericho Teachers Training College. After the relocation, Kabianga Farmers Training Centre was established in 1959 at the premises. Its objective was to serve as an Agricultural Training facility for farmers from the South Rift and beyond. Kabianga Farmers Training Centre became Kabianga Campus of Moi University in May 2007. In May 2009, the university campus was elevated to a university college. On 1 March 2013, it was awarded charter by H.E, Hon. Mwai Kibaki and became a fully fledged university.

== Location ==
The university is situated in the tea-growing highlands of Kericho in the southwestern end of the Rift Valley Province of Kenya and within the proximity of the multinational tea growing companies, Unilever, James Finlay, and George Williamson. It is located approximately 26 km from Kericho town and is about 6.2 km off-road a junction called Kabianga Dairies, formerly 'Premier Dairies' on Kericho-Kisii road.

Nearby shopping centers are Chepnyogaa market and Kabianga market. These markets are known for high-value cattle auctions and other businesses.

The surrounding community consists of the Kipsigis speakers. This community is known for mixed farming. The main agricultural activity being dairy farming, with the location of Kabianga Dairy approximately three kilometers from the university.

== Current status ==
The University of Kabiange joins the list of the recently established universities with a view of creating more learning opportunities. Currently, the university has an estimated 8000 students. The University of Kabianga is located in Kericho in Kenya.

The institution was the fifth best University nationally and 51st best in Sub-Saharan Africa by Times Higher Education in 2023.

== Academics ==
The University of Kabianga offers academic programmes at the undergraduate and graduate levels. The schools include:

- School of Science & Technology
- Information Science & Knowledge Management
- Education, Arts and Social Sciences
- Business & Economics
- Agricultural Sciences and Natural Resources
- School of health sciences
