= 2018 Kenya handshake =

2018 political truce between two leading political factions

The 2018 Kenya handshake was a political truce made on the 9th of March 2018 between Kenyan President Uhuru Kenyatta and former Kenyan Prime Minister Raila Odinga. The two had been the leaders of opposing political factions amidst widespread political violence and civil unrest; they had previously faced one another in the contested 2017 Kenyan general election. Under the agreement, their political feud was resolved, with Kenyatta agreeing to support Odinga in the upcoming presidential elections. As a result, the Azimio coalition was formed, Uhuru became its chairman, and Odinga as the presidential candidate with Martha Karua as his running mate. They lost to William Ruto, who was Kenyatta's deputy at the time. They challenged Ruto's victory in the Supreme Court, however, Chief Justice Martha Koome said his claims did not meet the evidentiary threshold and dismissed the case. At a March 2023 protest in Nairobi they demanded an audit of the IEBC election servers.

== Background information ==
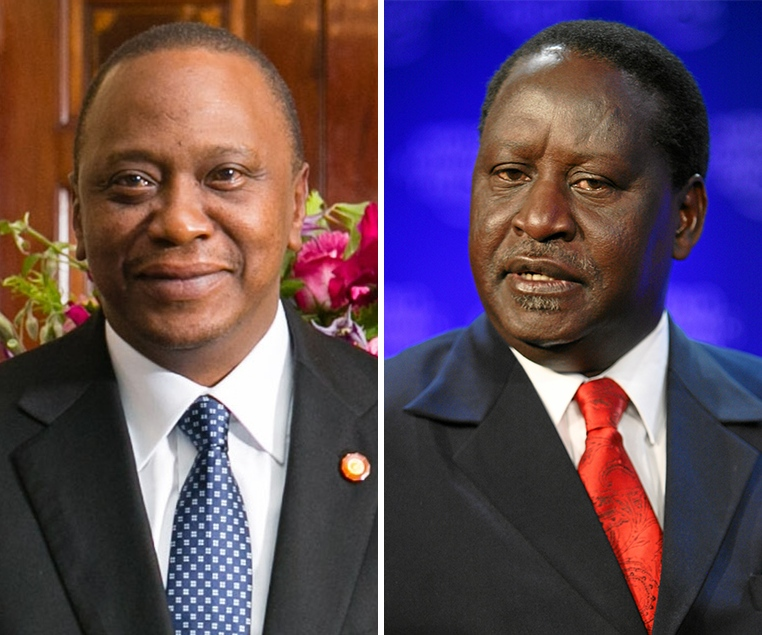
Uhuru Kenyatta and Raila Odinga, the previous political rivals

Historically, Kenya has been characterized by divisive politics arising from periodic general elections marred by alleged rigging and subsequent politically motivated violence. Kenya also has an extensive record of ethnically driven political violence and politician supported militias. Kenya's tribal war traces back to Jaramogi Oginga Odinga, when parties were formed based on one's tribe. The detrimental effects of disputed general elections were seen by 1997, when Kenya's ruling party, Kenya African National Union, used violence to coerce citizens and build a path for their devolution agenda.

The Digo people were mobilized to fight against the people of Kenya's Western and Central regions, resulting in the death of 104 civilians and the displacement of more than 10,000 people. Reports from the Judiciary indicated the existence of vigilante groups funding the then-ruling party led by Daniel arap Moi; key among them was Jeshi La Mzee. There was a resurgence of conflict between the Kikuyu and the Kalenjin people that persisted until 2013. In 2002, the National Rainbow Coalition, led by Mwai Kibaki, was established, leading to peace in 2005 when a referendum was held to vote for a newly drafted constitution. People on all sides felt the national coalition was divided along ethnic lines. This saw the Luo, led by Odinga, break away to form the Orange Democratic Movement.

The events that followed would see Kenya sink into a deep economic crisis after the 2007 and 2008 general elections. The presidential elections were hotly contested between Mwai Kibaki and Odinga, with Kibaki's win being contested by Odinga. He insisted the elections were marred by mass rigging, theft, and inconsistencies. Kenyans would refer to what followed as exemplifying Kenya's status as "a cradle of violence" after the elections plunged the country into a period of bloodshed and mass killings; animosity and enmity peaked across ethnic divides. Observers, including the European Union, noted discrepancies in the election results, which infuriated the ardent Odinga supporters in the Luo community. This period saw vigilante groups like Mungiki, American Maine, and China Group clashing and terrorizing civilians.

Over 1,300 people died, and at least 650,000 others were displaced, making it the most detrimental post-election skirmish in Kenya's history. The International Criminal Court instituted charges of crimes against humanity and inciting to violence on six Kenyans, widely referred to as the "Ocampo Six", among them Uhuru Kenyatta and the then deputy president of Kenya William Ruto. Later elections did not prove different. The 2013 Kenyan general elections were bitterly contested by rivals Kenyatta (The National Unity party) and Odinga (Coalition of Reforms and Democracy party). Uhuru was declared the winner, which Raila disputed due to the Bio-metric Voter System, which he highlighted had drawbacks. Coalition for Reforms and Democracy (CORD) called for reforms to ensure free and fair elections and challenged Uhuru's election in the Supreme Court, which later upheld Uhuru's election.

In 2017 the same contestants faced each other in an election that was presumed to be predetermined by unknown factions. The election faced allegations that the electoral systems had been hacked. The Chief Technological Officer at the Independent Electoral and Boundaries Commission (IEBC), Chris Msando, was murdered in a possible assassination. Tension rose, and the election was disputed by The National Super Alliance (NASA) led by Odinga and lawyers like Miguna Miguna, as they felt the electoral systems had been compromised.

NASA proceeded to the Supreme Court to seek the nullification of the elections. The topmost court, led by chief justice David Maraga, agreed and declared the election null and void. A repeat election, held on 26 October 2017, was boycotted by the Alliance, leaving Kenyatta with a landslide win by garnering 98% of the vote. There was a subsequent period of unrest, with Odinga staging a mock swearing-in ceremony and declaring himself as the People's President. This led to the warring factions of Uhuru supporters and Odinga supporters engaging in mass shootings, sexual assault, and other violence in opposition areas in Nairobi, Kisumu, and other cities.

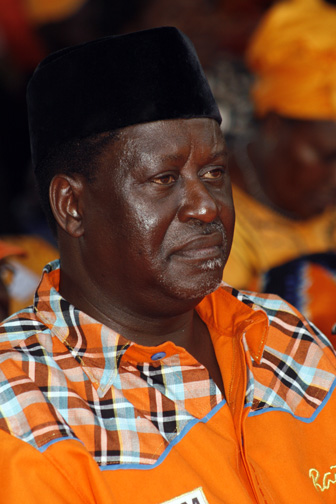
Raila Odinga, former Prime Minister of the Republic of Kenya and Leader of Opposition.

== The handshake ==
On 9 March 2018, Kenyans woke to the news that the key leaders, Raila Odinga and Uhuru Kenyatta, who were at the helm of the divisive politics and had been hurling insults at each other, were putting their differences aside and uniting through a "handshake". This was a public declaration to cease all hostilities and find common ground to move the country forward economically and politically. After a prolonged period of turmoil, Kenya was stabilizing.

However, politicians allied with The National Super Alliance (NASA) felt this was a betrayal as Odinga had not consulted them. Although most Kenyans perceived it as the leaders putting aside their personal interests for the country's common good, another section felt an element of betrayal in the sudden union. The handshake also sparked the 2022 presidential election campaign, with Raila joining the government, potentially threatening Ruto's presidency.

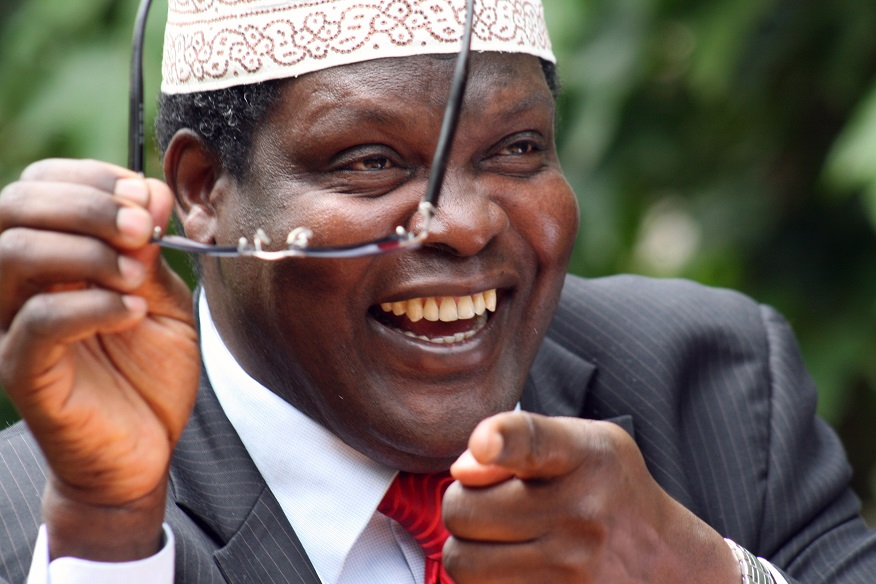
Miguna Miguna, Kenyan lawyer deported to Toronto, Canada

== Significance of the handshake ==
Raila Odinga could now freely visit Gatundu, and Kenyatta could visit Kisumu without any animosity from the locals. Embakasi East's Member of Parliament, Babu Owino, and Starehe's Charles Njagua, also announced an end to their hostilities.

On 20 October 2018, Odinga was appointed as the African Union's High Representative for Infrastructure Development. It was speculated that the appointment was due to his renewed good relations with Uhuru, which might have made Uhuru suggest him for the job. Odinga effectively resigned from this position on 23 February 2023, citing "challenges to my continued availability for the role" and his desire "to pursue other pressing and urgent" issues. At the time, Odinga had planned, and engaged in, countrywide mass demonstrations. On 22 February 2023, he issued a 14-day ultimatum for President William Ruto to act on alleged electoral injustice and the skyrocketing cost of living—or face nationwide protests.
