= October 2017 Kenyan presidential election =

- 26 October 2017
- Registered: 19,611,423
- Turnout: 39.03% (▼40.48pp)
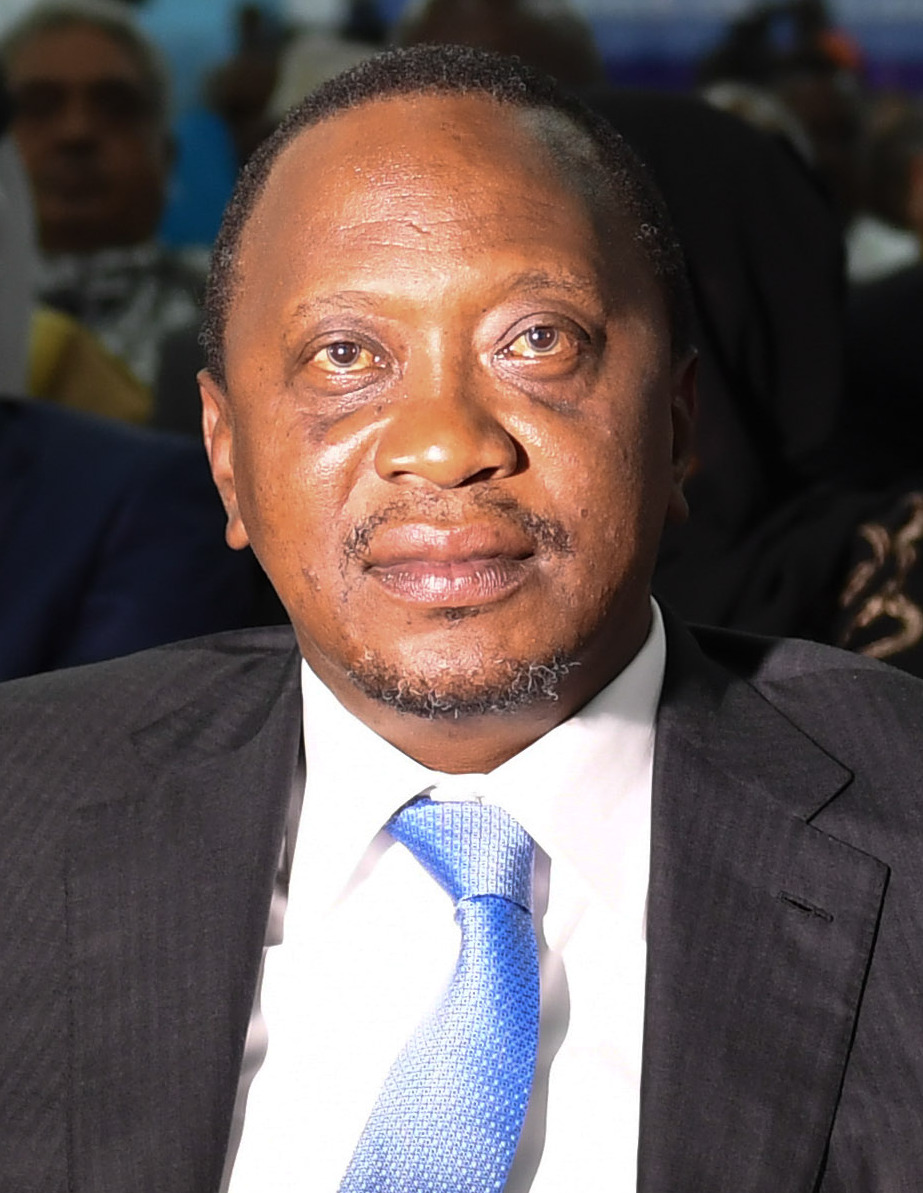

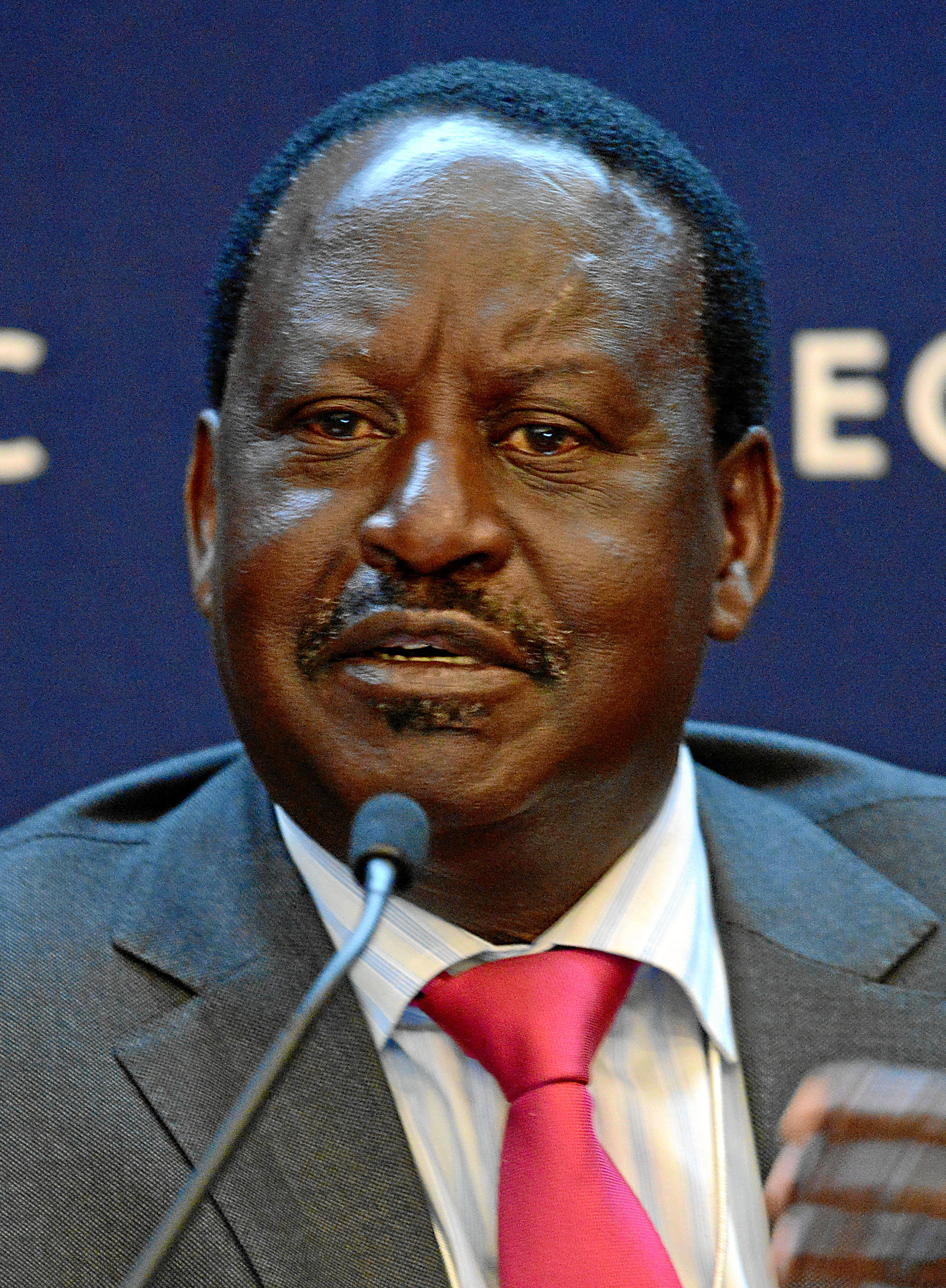
Nominee	Uhuru Kenyatta	Raila Odinga (withdrew)
Party	Jubilee	ODM
Alliance		NASA
Running mate	William Ruto	Kalonzo Musyoka
Popular vote	7,483,895	73,228
Percentage	98.26%	0.96%
- Results by county
President before election
Uhuru Kenyatta
Jubilee
Elected President
Uhuru Kenyatta
Jubilee

Presidential elections were held in Kenya on 26 October 2017 following the Supreme Court's annulment of the results of the presidential vote in the August 2017 general elections. Incumbent president and Jubilee Party candidate Uhuru Kenyatta won 98.3% of the vote, defeating Orange Democratic Movement candidate Raila Odinga, who had withdrawn weeks before the election, believing that the Independent Electoral and Boundaries Commission had no intention of implementing reforms that would ensure a credible process.

== Background ==
General elections were held in Kenya on 8 August 2017. Incumbent president Uhuru Kenyatta was declared the winner of the presidential contest with 54.17% of the vote, whilst his main rival Raila Odinga finished second with 44.94% of the vote. The opposition claimed that it had won and that the government had rigged the elections. The opposition appealed to the Supreme Court. Citing a breach of the technical processes required by the constitution and the law, the court returned a verdict (by a margin of 4–2) that the election had not been "conducted in accordance with the constitution", cancelling the results and ordering fresh elections to be held within 60 days. In a television address Kenyatta complained that the decision was tantamount to overturning the "will of the people". He nevertheless stated that though he disagreed with the Supreme Court's decision, he would obey that decision. Raila Odinga on the other hand welcomed the court's verdict, saying "This indeed is a very historic day for the people of Kenya and by extension the people of the continent of Africa."

== Electoral system ==
The President of Kenya is elected using a modified version of the two-round system: to win in the first round, a candidate must receive over 50% of the vote nationally and 25% of the vote in at least 24 of Kenya's 47 counties.

== Campaign ==
According to the Council on Foreign Relations, the Kenyatta-Odinga family rivalry was a matter of personality and tribe, with their respective parties serving as vehicles for their political ambitions rather than platforms for distinct policies. Nevertheless, Kenyatta was considered more pro-business and supported legislation that would limit the role of judges in future elections, accusing the Supreme Court's judges of being bought off by "white people and other trash." Odinga was considered more of a populist and advocated for wide-ranging changes to electoral commission personnel and practices.

On 10 October, following a series of opposition protests aimed at forcing the government into concessions, Odinga announced his withdrawal from the election, believing that the IEBC had no intention of implementing reforms that would ensure a credible process. Following his withdrawal, constitutional lawyers debated whether the election could proceed and if Odinga's name would still appear on the ballot.

On 18 October, IEBC Commissioner Roselyn Akombe resigned and fled to the United States, citing fears for her life. She claimed that the commissioners were partisan and unable to deliver a credible election, and that they faced political intimidation. IEBC Chairman Wafula Chebukati also expressed skepticism about a fair election, claiming the IEBC commissioners were partisan-minded and that he would resign unless certain conditions are met to reform the IEBC.

On 20 October, the IEBC's chief executive officer Ezra Chiloba announced that he will not be monitoring the election and that starting 23 October, he will take a three-week vacation. Chiloba's departure has created more uncertainty over who will monitor the election.

On 24 October, the IEBC announced that it would now count back-up paper ballots and not rush to announce the official results based only on numbers sent from the polling stations like in the first presidential election as well. The same day, Chebukati appointed IEBC Vice Chair Consolata N.B. Maina as the IEBC Deputy National Returning Officer.

== Results ==
On 30 October the IEBC declared Kenyatta the winner of the elections.

Candidate	Running mate	Party	Votes	%
Uhuru Kenyatta	William Ruto	Jubilee Party	7,483,895	98.26
Raila Odinga	Kalonzo Musyoka	National Super Alliance	73,228	0.96
Ekuru Aukot	Emmanuel Nzai	Thirdway Alliance Kenya	21,333	0.28
Abduba Dida	Titus Ngetuny	Alliance for Real Change	14,107	0.19
Japheth Kaluyu	Muthiora Kariara	Independent	8,261	0.11
Michael Wainaina	Miriam Mutua	Independent	6,007	0.08
Joseph Nyagah	Moses Marango	Independent	5,554	0.07
Cyrus Jirongo	Joseph Momanyi	United Democratic Party	3,832	0.05
Total			7,616,217	100.00
Valid votes			7,616,217	99.51
Invalid/blank votes			37,713	0.49
Total votes			7,653,930	100.00
Registered voters/turnout			19,611,423	39.03
Source: IEBC

== Aftermath ==
=== Supreme Court decision ===
Two petitions were filed at Kenyan Supreme Court challenging the results of the 26 October 2017 election. The six judge bench unanimously decided that the petitions had no merit and upheld Uhuru Kenyatta's win for a second term.

=== Inauguration ===
As per the constitutional timelines, Kenyatta's second inauguration was conducted on 28 November 2017.
