= 2017 Kenyan presidential election petition =

Challenge to an election

Presidential Election Petition 1 of 2017
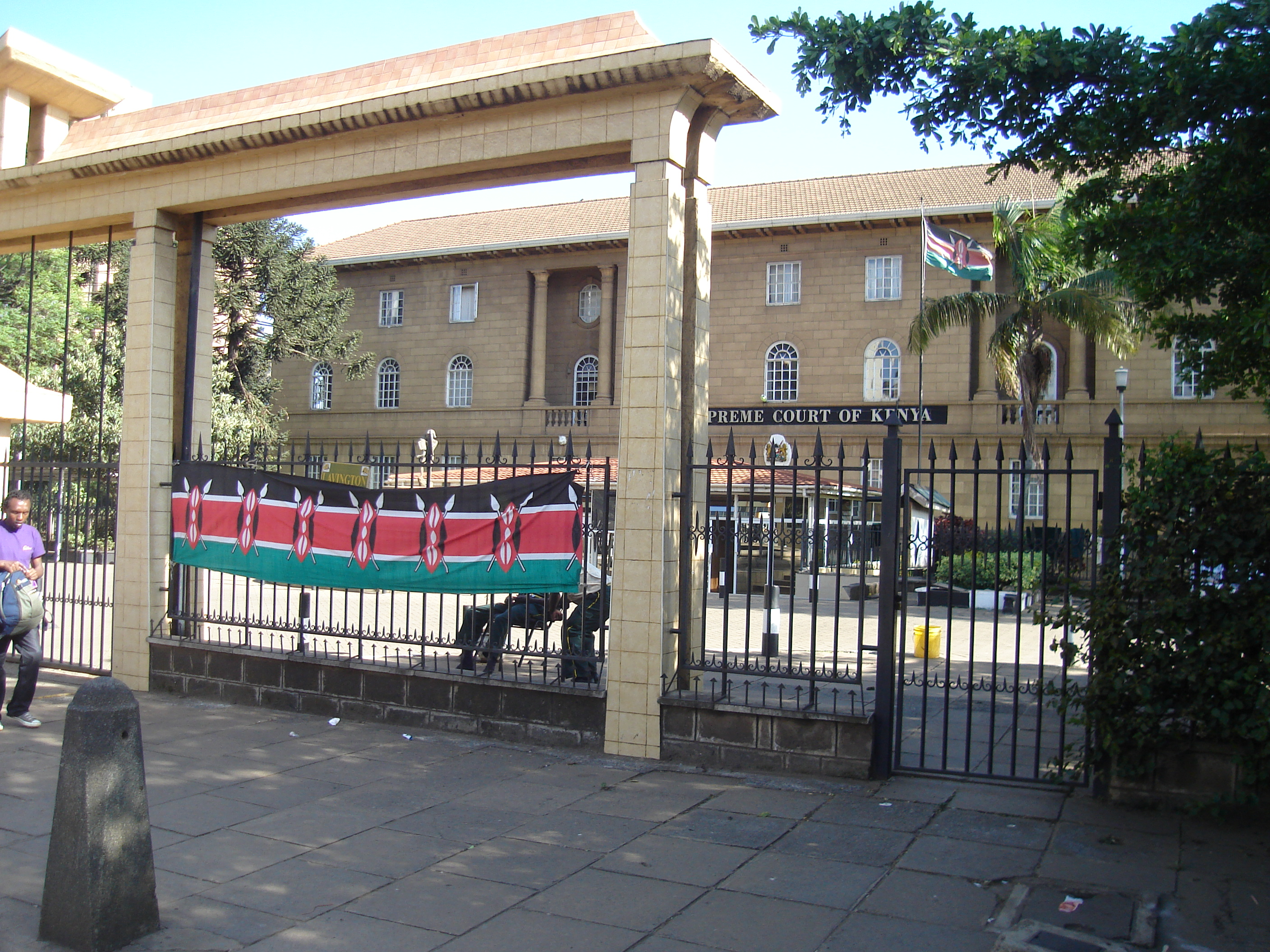
- Court: Supreme Court of Kenya
- Full case name: Raila Amolo Odinga & Stephen Kalonzo Musyoka v Independent Electoral and Boundaries Commission, Chairperson Independent Electoral and Boundaries Commission & Uhuru Muigai Kenyatta (Election Petition 1 of 2017) [2017] KESC 31 (KLR)
- Started: August 18, 2017
- Decided: September 1, 2017
- Citation: [2017] KESC 31; PR956575

Case history
- Subsequent action: Fresh presidential election ordered by court

Court membership
- Judges sitting: David Kenani Maraga (CJ and President); Philomena Mbete Mwilu (DCJ and Vice President); Jackton Boma Ojwang; Smokin Charles Wanjala; Njoki Susanna Ndung'u; Isaac Lenaola

Case opinions
- Decision by: David Kenani Maraga, Philomena Mbete Mwilu, Jackton Boma Ojwang, Smokin Charles Wanjala, Njoki Susanna Ndung'u, Isaac Lenaola
- Concurrence: David Kenani Maraga, Philomena Mbete Mwilu, Smokin Charles Wanjala, Isaac Lenaola
- Dissent: Jackton Boma Ojwang, Njoki Susanna Ndung'u

The 2017 Kenyan presidential election petition (Presidential Election Petition 1 of 2017) was a Supreme Court of Kenya challenge to the results of the 8 August 2017 presidential election. The petition was brought forward by Raila Odinga and Kalonzo Musyoka, the National Super Alliance (NASA) candidates, challenging the legitimacy of Kenya's August 8, 2017, presidential election. The petitioners alleged that the Independent Electoral and Boundaries Commission (IEBC) had failed to comply with constitutional and statutory requirements, including irregularities in electronic result transmission and non-publication of Form 34 results. They sought to overturn the election results and demanded a new election be conducted.

On September 1, 2017, the Supreme Court of Kenya issued decision, annulling the presidential election by a vote of four judges to two. The court determined that there were significant failures in the transmission of results from polling stations to constituency tallying centers and the national tallying center, which jeopardized the election's integrity. The court also found that the IEBC did not follow constitutional and statutory provisions for election administration. The court ordered that a new presidential election be held within 60 days in accordance with the constitution.

== Background of the case ==
The petitioners were Raila Odinga, former prime minister of Kenya and presidential candidate for the NASA, a coalition of several opposition parties that formed ahead of the 2017 general elections. His running mate was Stephen Kalonzo Musyoka, former vice president and leader of the Wiper Democratic Movement. The respondents in the petition were the IEBC, Wafula Chebukati, the chairperson of IEBC; and Uhuru Kenyatta, the incumbent president and candidate of Jubilee Party, another coalition of several parties that supported his re-election bid.

The presidential election was conducted on August 8, alongside five other elections for members of parliament, senators, governors, county assembly members, and women representatives. According to IEBC's official results announced on August 11 by Chebukati, Kenyatta won the presidential election with 8,203,290 votes (54.27%), followed by Odinga with 6,762,224 votes (44.74%). The voter turnout was reported as 79.5%. Chebukati declared Kenyatta as the duly elected president and issued him with a certificate. However, these results were rejected by NASA who claimed that they were manipulated by IEBC in favor of Kenyatta.

== Hearing the case ==
Between August 26 and August 29, the Supreme Court heard oral arguments from all parties. The court also ordered IEBC to provide all parties with access to its servers and original result forms for review. IEBC, on the other hand, failed to fully comply with this order, citing technical difficulties and security concerns.

== Supreme Court decision ==
On September 1, the Supreme Court delivered its judgment by a majority of four judges to two. The court found that there were substantial failures in the transmission of results from polling stations to constituency tallying centers and to the national tallying center, which affected the integrity of the election. The court also found that IEBC failed to comply with constitutional and statutory provisions on conducting elections, such as using biometric technology for voter identification; transmitting provisional results electronically; publishing scanned images of result forms online; and verifying final results using original forms.The court held that these failures violated Article 81(e) of the Constitution, which requires elections to be free, fair, transparent, verifiable, accountable, accurate, secure, efficient, and credible. The court also held that these failures affected Article 86(a) of the Constitution, which requires elections to be simple, accurate, verifiable, secure, accountable and transparent. The court further held that these failures invalidated the declaration of Kenyatta as the winner of the presidential election by Chebukati under Section 39(1)(i) of the Elections Act. The court reasoned that Chebukati did not have sufficient evidence to support his declaration based on incomplete and unverified results.

The court concluded that these failures affected the outcome of the presidential election in a significant way. The court noted that it was not necessary for it to determine whether there was any hacking or manipulation of IEBC's servers or result forms by any party, as alleged by NASA. The court also noted that it was not necessary for it to determine whether Kenyatta engaged in any electoral malpractices, as alleged by NASA.

The court therefore nullified the presidential election under Article 140(2) (a) of the Constitution. The court ordered IEBC to conduct a fresh presidential election within 60 days in accordance with Article 140(3) (a) of the Constitution and applicable laws. The court also ordered IEBC to ensure compliance with constitutional principles and statutory provisions on conducting elections.

== Criticism about the Petition Timeline ==
There has been increasing criticism regarding the 14-day timeframe for filing and ruling on Kenyan presidential election petitions, with many considering it insufficient given the complexity of such cases.

In 2020, NASA argued that the 48-hour timeframe to prepare a solid case placed significant pressure on its legal team and was insufficient.. In 2023, former Attorney General Githu Muigai told the National Dialogue Committee (NADCO) that the 14-day timeframe for determining election petitions is restrictive and poses a significant threat to national security if the case remains unresolved within the set period.

== Reception ==
Following the ruling, NASA supporters celebrated and rejoiced across the country. International media outlets reacted as well, praising the Supreme Court and Kenya for their commitment to democracy. The New York Times described it as "a surprise ruling that nullified the re-election of a sitting president" and "a rare example of a judicial check on executive power," while The Guardian described it as "a watershed moment for African democracy" and "a stunning rebuke to Kenya's political establishment"; the BBC noted that it was "the first time in Africa that a court has ruled against the electoral victory of an incumbent based on a challenge by the opposition" and "a landmark in African history".
