= 2013 Nandi local elections =

Local elections in Kenya

Local elections were held in Nandi County on 4 March 2013. Under the new constitution, which was passed in a 2010 referendum, the 2013 general election was the first in which county governors and their deputies were elected for the 47 newly created counties. They were also the first general elections run by the Independent Electoral and Boundaries Commission (IEBC) which released the official list of candidates.

== Demographics ==
The county had a population of 752,965 for which 354,710 voter IDs were issued. The election had a turnout of 89%, which was three percentage points above the national average.

== Gubernatorial election ==
Candidate	Running Mate	Coalition	Party	Votes	Elected?
Bett, Judah Kimeli	Benadatte, Jeptoo		Kenya African National Union	--	
Cheison, Seronei Chelulei	Leley, Bitek Kipyego	Cord	Orange Democratic Movement	--	
Lagat, Joseph Manjoy	Lagat, Nelson		Restore and Build Kenya	--	
Lagat, Cleophas Kiprop	Biwott, Dominic Kimutai		United Republican Party	--	Yes
