= Julie Soweto =

Kenyan lawyer and human rights advocate

- Born: Kenya
- Education: University of Nairobi; University of Pretoria
- Occupations: Lawyer, human rights advocate
- Employer(s): Soweto & Co. Advocates
- Known for: Constitutional law and election petition litigation
- Notable work: Participation in the 2017 and 2022 Kenyan presidential election petitions

Julie Soweto is a Kenyan lawyer and human rights defender.

== Early life and education ==
Soweto pursued her secondary school studies at the Kenya High School. She later enrolled for a Bachelor of Laws (LLB) from the University of Nairobi. She also holds a master's degree in law from the University of Pretoria.

== Career ==
Julie Soweto started her career as an intern to the Commissioners at the South Africa Human Rights Commission. She later joined the University of Pretoria, Centre for Human Rights where she served as a researcher and tutor.

Soweto got a chance to work as a law clerk at the Constitutional Court of South Africa in 2004. She later became an associate at JAB Orengo Advocates until 2012 after serving for seven years . In 2012, she founded her own law firm known as Soweto and Company Advocates.

Soweto represented Azimio la Umoja chief Raila Odinga in the 2017 presidential petition at the Supreme Court.

Julie Soweto was a member of Raila Odinga's legal team during the Presidential election petition. She was a star lawyer who strongly stood in the supreme court and showed how a foreigner of Venezuelan origin known as Jose Camargo tampered with the IEBC Servers during the Election on 9 August 2022.

== See also ==
- Martha Koome
- Raila Odinga
- James Orengo
- Irene Masit
