= 2017 Kenyan general election =

- 8 August 2017
- Presidential election (annulled)

19,611,423 registered voters 50% + 1 vote (nationally) and 25% in at least 24 counties votes needed to win
- Turnout: 79.51% (▼6.40pp)
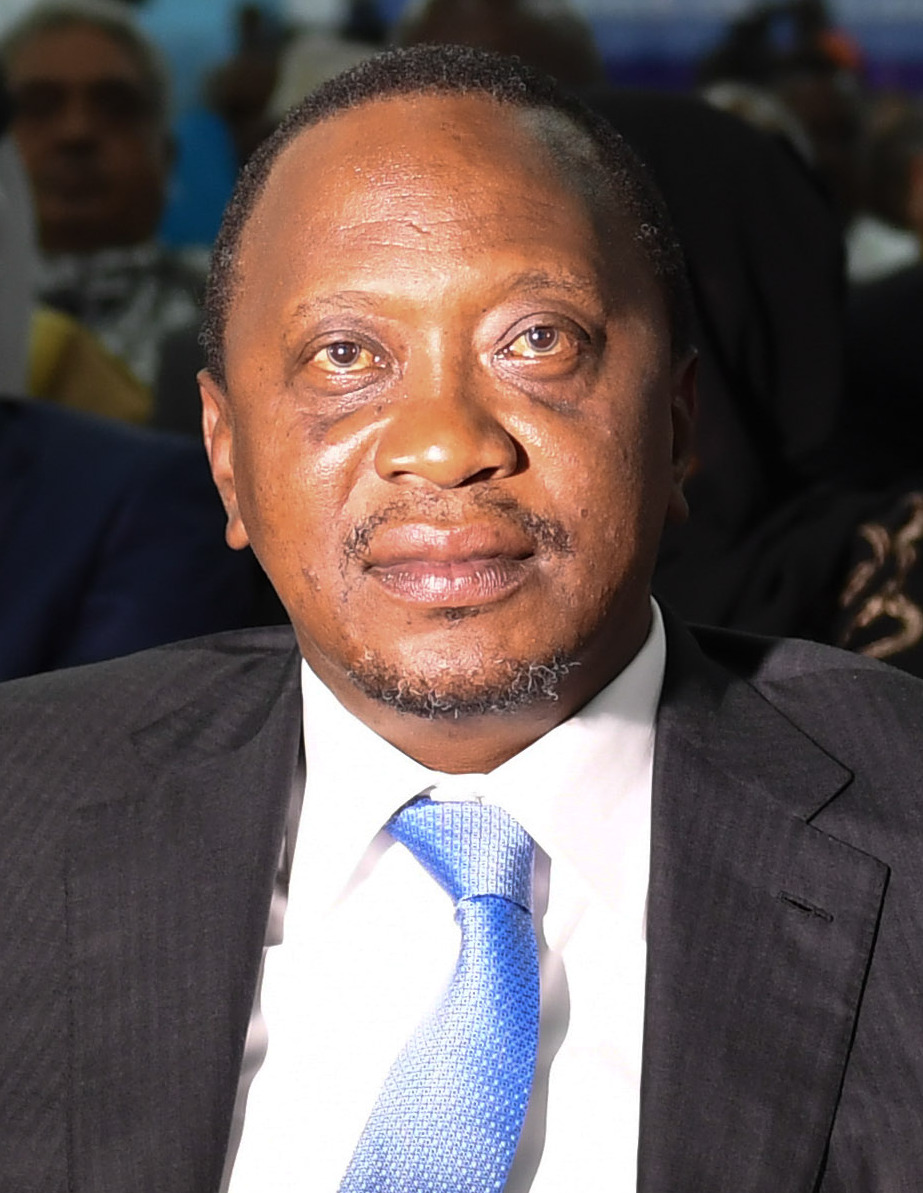

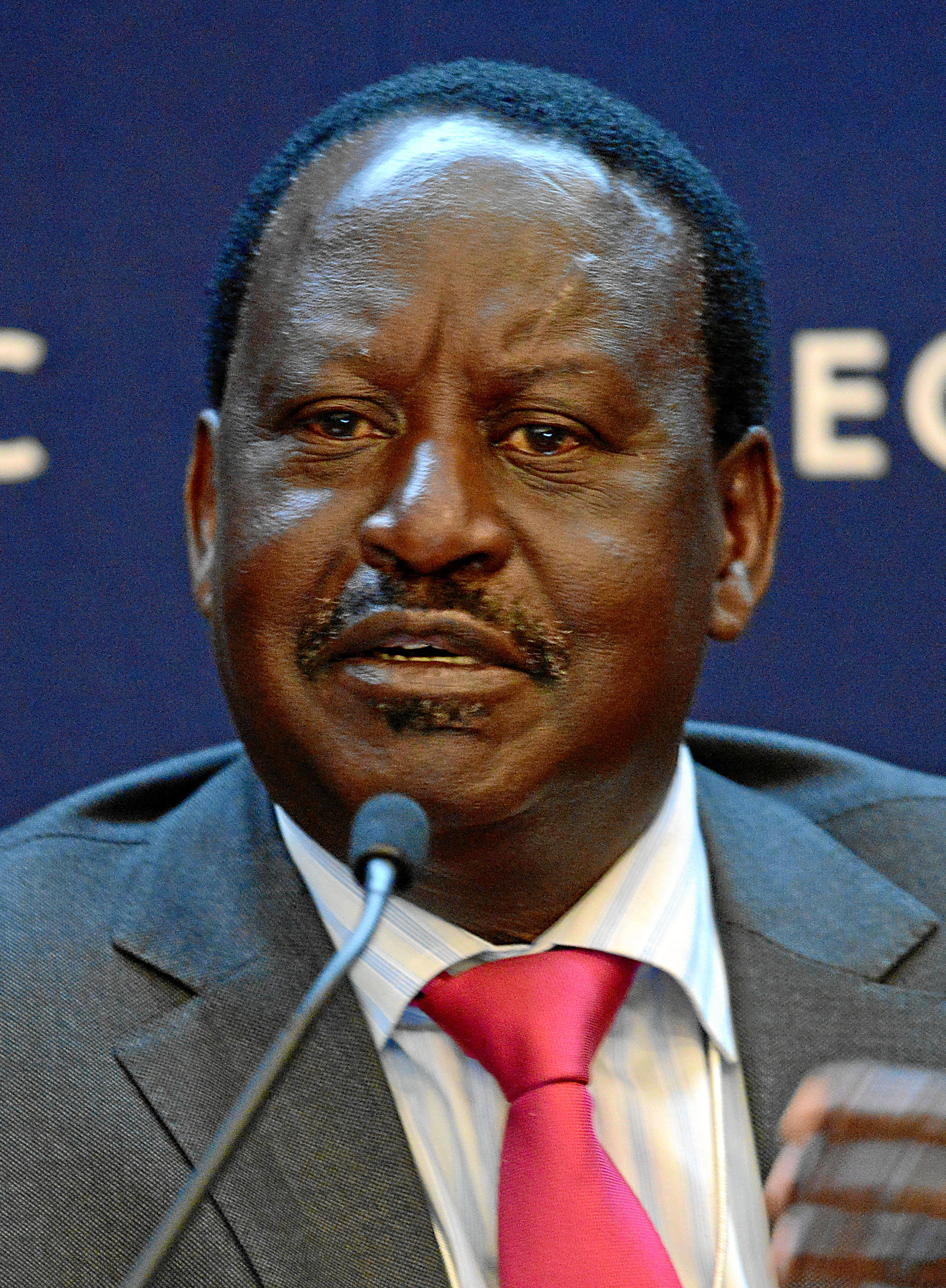
Nominee	Uhuru Kenyatta	Raila Odinga
Party	Jubilee	ODM
Alliance		NASA
Running mate	William Ruto	Kalonzo Musyoka
Popular vote	8,223,369	6,822,812
Percentage	54.17%	44.94%
- County-level results
President before election
Uhuru Kenyatta
Jubilee
President after election
Election results annulled
Uhuru Kenyatta remains president

General elections were held in Kenya on 8 August 2017 to elect the President, members of the National Assembly and Senate. They coincided with the 2017 Kenyan local elections which elected Governors and representatives in the devolved governments.

The published results showed that incumbent President Uhuru Kenyatta of the Jubilee Party had been re-elected with 54% of the vote. However, his main opponent, Raila Odinga of the Orange Democratic Movement, refused to accept the results and contested them in the Supreme Court. The results of the presidential election were subsequently annulled by the court and fresh presidential elections were ordered to be held within 60 days. It was later announced that the elections would be held in October.

The results of the parliamentary and local elections remained valid. The Jubilee Party retained its majority in the Senate, winning 34 of the 67 seats, and remained the largest party in the National Assembly with 171 of the 341 seats. The Orange Democratic Movement won 20 seats in the Senate and 76 in the National Assembly.

== Background ==
The Kenyan Constitution requires a general election on the second Tuesday in August in every fifth year. There have been public discussions to move the date from August to December with proponents pointing to the fiscal timeline (1 July – 30 June) clashing with an August date, because most ministries that support critical election processes will not have been fully funded and that a possible presidential runoff vote may interfere with the national examinations calendar of October and December.

Opponents of the proposed date change have argued for protecting the constitutional provision and that any change would be mired by legal challenges and might drag on to the next elections and still require a referendum to decide, putting the country's stability at risk.

On 7 August 2017, one day before the election, Barack Obama, who served as the 44th President of the United States from 2009 to 2017 and whose father, Barack Obama Sr., was Kenyan, called for calm and acceptance of the election results.

== Electoral system ==
The President of Kenya is elected using a modified version of the two-round system: to win in the first round, a candidate must receive over 50% of the vote and at least 25% of the vote in a minimum of 24 of the 47 counties.

The 337 members of the National Assembly are elected by two methods; 290 are elected in single-member constituencies by first-past-the-post voting. The remaining 47 are reserved for women and are elected from single-member constituencies based on the 47 counties, also using the first-past-the-post system. The 67 members of the Senate are elected by four methods; 47 are elected in single-member constituencies based on the counties by first-past-the-post voting. Parties are then assigned a share of 16 seats for women, two for youth and two for disabled people based on their seat share.

== Party primaries ==
The Independent Electoral and Boundaries Commission set the duration for political parties to conduct their primaries in April 2017 following the review of Kenya's Election Laws. Parties would have 14 days between 20 April and 2 May to conduct their primaries and submit their candidates to the electoral commission.

== Conduct ==
=== William Ruto home siege ===
On 29 July 2017, Deputy President William Ruto's house was attacked by a local man armed with a machete. During the siege, the deputy president and his family were not present. The assailant first injured the guard on duty, held him hostage and then killed him. The siege lasted 18 hours before special forces of the Kenyan Police shot the attacker dead. The motives of the attacker were unknown and members of the public were unaware how a man armed with a machete held the elite police forces at bay for 18 hours.

=== Msando murder ===
On 27 July 2017, two bodies were found on the outskirts of Nairobi. One of the dead, Christopher Msando, was the head of information, communication, and technology at the Independent Electoral and Boundaries Commission. He played a major role in developing the new voting system for the election. His body showed apparent marks of torture before he was murdered for unclear reasons. Alongside it was the body of a 21-year-old woman, Maryanne Ngumbu. The FBI and Scotland Yard offered to help in the investigation.

The murder of Msando raised suspicion among the opposition that it was part of a plot by the ruling party to rig the election, as it appeared Msando was standing in the way.

Andrew Kipkoech Rono, 58, who was arrested over allegations he sent a threatening message to Msando before he was killed, appeared before High Court judge, James Wakiaga.

== Results ==
=== President ===
Kenyatta had maintained 10+% lead over Odinga in most polls for many weeks, but the two most recent polls before the election suggested a much closer race. The outcome was reported as a 9.5% victory for Kenyatta. On 10 August, provisional results released by the Kenyan electoral commission put Kenyatta ahead by 54.2% to Odinga's 44.92%. The head of the EU delegation Marietje Schaake said there had been no sign of manipulation of the result at central or local level and urged all sides to accept the result.

The Independent Electoral and Boundaries Commission (IEBC) declared incumbents Uhuru Kenyatta and William Ruto as president-elect and deputy president-elect respectively on the evening of 11 August 2017. The National Super Alliance disputed the results.

Candidate	Running mate	Party	Votes	%
Uhuru Kenyatta	William Ruto	Jubilee Party	8,223,369	54.17
Raila Odinga	Kalonzo Musyoka	National Super Alliance	6,822,812	44.94
Joseph Nyagah	Moses Marango	Independent	38,029	0.25
Abduba Dida	Titus Ngetuny	Alliance for Real Change	38,004	0.25
Ekuru Aukot	Emmanuel Nzai	Thirdway Alliance Kenya	27,400	0.18
Japheth Kaluyu	Muthiora Kariara	Independent	11,774	0.08
Cyrus Jirongo	Joseph Momanyi	United Democratic Party	11,282	0.07
Michael Wainaina	Miriam Mutua	Independent	8,870	0.06
Total			15,181,540	100.00
Valid votes			15,181,540	97.36
Invalid/blank votes			411,510	2.64
Total votes			15,593,050	100.00
Registered voters/turnout			19,611,423	79.51
Source: IEBC

==== By county ====
#	County	Uhuru Kenyata		Raila Odinga		Others		Total	Registered voters	Turnout
#	County	Votes		Votes		Votes		Total	Registered voters	Turnout
1	Mombasa	99,508	29.10	238,943	69.90	3,575	1.00	342,026	580,223	58.95
2	Kwale	43,812	23.70	138,664	75.00	2,307	1.20	184,783	281,041	65.75
3	Kilifi	49,693	15.20	273,852	83.60	4,196	1.30	327,741	508,068	64.51
4	Tana River	40,317	46.10	45,641	52.20	1,490	1.70	87,448	118,327	73.90
5	Lamu	24,225	48.90	24,423	49.30	868	1.80	49,516	69,776	70.96
6	Taita Taveta	31,158	27.70	79,832	70.90	1,542	1.40	112,532	155,716	72.27
7	Garissa	54,825	48.30	54,784	48.30	3,905	3.40	113,514	163,350	69.49
8	Wajir	61,199	51.20	52,840	44.20	5,482	4.60	119,521	162,902	73.37
9	Mandera	113,469	83.00	18,122	13.30	5,054	3.70	136,645	175,642	77.80
10	Marsabit	92,681	83.60	16,114	14.50	2,026	1.80	110,821	141,708	78.20
11	Isiolo	26,732	49.30	19,029	35.10	8,440	15.60	54,201	75,338	71.94
12	Meru	483,033	88.90	55,951	10.30	4,596	0.80	543,580	702,480	77.38
13	Tharaka–Nithi	162,923	93.30	10,334	5.90	1,458	0.80	174,715	213,154	81.97
14	Embu	232,409	92.20	17,623	7.00	2,108	0.80	252,140	309,468	81.48
15	Kitui	64,726	18.00	287,198	79.90	7,434	2.10	359,358	474,512	75.73
16	Machakos	83,039	17.60	381,220	80.90	6,853	1.50	471,112	620,254	75.95
17	Makueni	27,424	8.20	301,155	90.60	3,903	1.20	332,482	423,310	78.54
18	Nyandarua	286,555	99.00	2,305	0.80	624	0.20	289,484	335,634	86.25
19	Nyeri	388,362	98.40	4,719	1.20	1,428	0.40	394,509	456,949	86.34
20	Kirinyaga	297,086	98.60	3,117	1.00	1,058	0.40	301,261	349,836	86.11
21	Murang'a	498,051	97.90	9,133	1.80	1,624	0.30	508,808	587,126	86.66
22	Kiambu	913,607	92.70	69,157	7.00	2,653	0.30	985,417	1,180,920	83.44
23	Turkana	59,239	44.90	71,326	54.10	1,249	0.90	131,814	191,435	68.86
24	West Pokot	97,677	64.80	51,930	34.40	1,174	0.80	150,781	180,232	83.66
25	Samburu	31,786	49.70	31,661	49.50	541	0.80	63,988	82,787	77.29
26	Trans Nzoia	110,338	44.60	134,462	54.30	2,840	1.10	247,640	339,622	72.92
27	Uasin Gishu	267,392	78.20	72,574	21.20	1,934	0.60	341,900	450,055	75.97
28	Elgeyo Marakwet	138,755	94.70	7,046	4.80	784	0.50	146,585	180,664	81.14
29	Nandi	235,739	86.80	34,148	12.60	1,686	0.60	271,573	346,007	78.49
30	Baringo	161,634	84.90	27,725	14.60	1,085	0.60	190,444	232,258	82.00
31	Laikipia	177,747	89.10	20,872	10.50	927	0.50	199,546	246,487	80.96
32	Nakuru	639,528	84.80	111,789	14.80	3,220	0.40	754,537	949,618	79.46
33	Narok	149,989	53.10	130,056	46.10	2,166	0.80	282,211	341,730	82.58
34	Kajiado	186,326	57.10	138,585	42.50	1,386	0.40	326,297	411,193	79.35
35	Kericho	281,773	92.90	19,562	6.40	2,135	0.70	303,470	375,668	80.78
36	Bomet	229,581	87.00	32,002	12.10	2,279	0.90	263,862	322,012	81.94
37	Kakamega	63,910	11.50	485,373	87.40	6,298	1.10	555,581	743,736	74.70
38	Vihiga	18,562	9.10	181,889	89.60	2,451	1.20	202,902	272,409	74.48
39	Bungoma	127,415	30.20	287,316	68.10	7,185	1.70	421,916	559,850	75.36
40	Busia	34,496	12.50	240,416	86.80	2,022	0.70	276,934	351,048	78.89
41	Siaya	2,533	0.70	376,647	99.10	840	0.20	380,020	457,953	82.98
42	Kisumu	7,743	1.80	430,229	97.90	1,451	0.30	439,423	539,210	81.49
43	Homa Bay	1,952	0.50	400,218	99.40	666	0.20	402,836	476,875	84.47
44	Migori	45,655	14.20	274,938	85.40	1,534	0.50	322,127	388,633	82.89
45	Kisii	175,415	43.20	224,855	55.40	5,602	1.40	405,872	546,580	74.26
46	Nyamira	106,894	52.10	95,470	46.50	2,912	1.40	205,276	278,853	73.61
47	Nairobi City	793,065	48.50	834,032	51.00	8,319	0.50	1,635,416	2,250,853	72.66
48	Diaspora	1,504	52.90	1,321	46.40	19	0.70	2,844	4,393	64.74
49	Prisons	1,887	45.70	2,214	53.60	30	0.70	4,131	5,528	74.73
Total		8,223,369	54.17	6,822,812	44.94	135,359	0.89	15,181,540	19,611,423	77.41

Counties in the Mount Kenya region showed votes decisively in support of President Kenyatta (Jubilee Party). Kenyatta secured 92.61% of the valid votes (3,579,771 votes) against Odinga's 6.68% (294,348 votes). The ten-county region exhibited high civic participation, with a voter turnout of 82.5%. Nyandarua County recorded the highest support for Kenyatta at around 99% of the total votes, while Nakuru County, despite being his lowest-performing county in the region, still gave him a commanding 84.74% of its vote.

=== Senate ===
Three women, Uasin Gishu's Margaret Kamar, Susan Kihika of Nakuru and Fatuma Dullo of Isiolo became the first women in Kenya's history to be elected to the Senate rather than appointed. Kihika was also elected Senate Majority Whip on 31 August.

Party	Votes	%	Seats					+/–
Party	Votes	%	County	Women	Youth	Disabled	Total	+/–
Jubilee Party	6,265,112	41.46	24	8	1	1	34	–2
Orange Democratic Movement	3,603,167	23.84	13	5	1	1	20	+3
Wiper Democratic Movement – Kenya	940,218	6.22	2	1	0	0	3	–2
Forum for the Restoration of Democracy – Kenya	556,638	3.68	1	0	0	0	1	–3
Kenya African National Union	502,087	3.32	2	1	0	0	3	0
Amani National Congress	493,222	3.26	2	1	0	0	3	New
Party of National Unity	199,277	1.32	0	0	0	0	0	–
Chama Cha Uzalendo	199,031	1.32	1	0	0	0	1	+1
Maendeleo Chap Chap Party	193,269	1.28	0	0	0	0	0	–
Peoples Democratic Party	118,688	0.79	0	0	0	0	0	–
Peoples Trust Party	84,856	0.56	0	0	0	0	0	–
National Vision Party	75,043	0.50	0	0	0	0	0	–
Economic Freedom Party	64,480	0.43	0	0	0	0	0	–
Kenya African Democratic Union – Asili	48,873	0.32	0	0	0	0	0	–
Frontier Alliance Party	41,722	0.28	0	0	0	0	0	–
Maendeleo Democratic Party	29,300	0.19	0	0	0	0	0	–
Safina	29,120	0.19	0	0	0	0	0	–
National Liberal Party	28,488	0.19	0	0	0	0	0	–
Labour Party of Kenya	23,198	0.15	0	0	0	0	0	–
National Rainbow Coalition – Kenya	22,031	0.15	0	0	0	0	0	–
Democratic Party of Kenya	21,552	0.14	0	0	0	0	0	–
Progressive Party of Kenya	21,025	0.14	0	0	0	0	0	–
Agano Party	19,164	0.13	0	0	0	0	0	–
Chama Cha Mashinani	17,525	0.12	0	0	0	0	0	–
Forum for Republican Democracy	16,133	0.11	0	0	0	0	0	–
Thirdway Alliance Kenya	15,594	0.10	0	0	0	0	0	–
Party of Development and Reforms	15,547	0.10	1	0	0	0	1	New
United Democratic Party	13,429	0.09	0	0	0	0	0	–
Federal Party of Kenya	13,250	0.09	0	0	0	0	0	–
Restore and Build Kenya	12,668	0.08	0	0	0	0	0	–
Republican Liberty Party	10,051	0.07	0	0	0	0	0	–
Kenya National Congress	9,669	0.06	0	0	0	0	0	–
Empowerment and Liberation Party	9,533	0.06	0	0	0	0	0	–
Mazingira Green Party of Kenya	8,793	0.06	0	0	0	0	0	–
Vibrant Democratic Party	7,631	0.05	0	0	0	0	0	–
Kenya Social Congress	6,956	0.05	0	0	0	0	0	–
Alternative Leadership Party of Kenya	5,708	0.04	0	0	0	0	0	–
Social Democratic Party of Kenya	3,634	0.02	0	0	0	0	0	–
Chama Mwangaza Daima	3,556	0.02	0	0	0	0	0	–
New Democrats	2,956	0.02	0	0	0	0	0	–
Shirikisho Party of Kenya	2,879	0.02	0	0	0	0	0	–
Peoples Empowerment Party	2,498	0.02	0	0	0	0	0	–
Movement for Democracy and Growth	1,825	0.01	0	0	0	0	0	–
Kenya Patriots Party	1,711	0.01	0	0	0	0	0	–
United Democratic Movement	1,508	0.01	0	0	0	0	0	–
Justice and Freedom Party	883	0.01	0	0	0	0	0	–
Independent	1,347,805	8.92	1	0	0	0	1	+1
Total	15,111,303	100.00	47	16	2	2	67	0
Source: IPU, Independent Electoral and Boundaries Commission

=== National Assembly ===
Party	Constituency			County (women)			Seats		
Party	Votes	%	Seats	Votes	%	Seats	Appointed	Total	+/–
Jubilee Party	6,029,273	40.20	140	6,337,957	41.79	23	6	169	–33
Orange Democratic Movement	2,884,267	19.23	62	3,649,509	24.06	12	3	77	–20
Wiper Democratic Movement – Kenya	770,875	5.14	19	882,174	5.82	3	1	23	–3
Amani National Congress	569,022	3.79	12	324,056	2.14	1	1	14	New
Forum for the Restoration of Democracy – Kenya	495,043	3.30	10	458,770	3.03	1	1	12	+2
Kenya African National Union	366,808	2.45	8	357,146	2.36	2	0	10	+4
Maendeleo Chap Chap Party	251,876	1.68	3	191,345	1.26	1	0	4	New
Party of National Unity	179,130	1.19	1	67,539	0.45	0	0	1	New
National Rainbow Coalition – Kenya	122,804	0.82	0	42,618	0.28	0	0	0	–1
Chama Cha Mashinani	90,923	0.61	2	151,062	1.00	0	0	2	New
Democratic Party of Kenya	70,388	0.47	1	3,057	0.02	0	0	1	+1
Party of Development and Reforms	67,515	0.45	3	225,557	1.49	2	0	5	New
Economic Freedom Party	66,711	0.44	4	65,698	0.43	1	0	5	New
Muungano Party	63,320	0.42	1				0	1	0
Peoples Democratic Party	53,358	0.36	2				0	2	+1
Kenya National Congress	44,222	0.29	2	8,516	0.06	0	0	2	0
Frontier Alliance Party	39,462	0.26	1	35,336	0.23	0	0	1	New
Mazingira Green Party of Kenya	34,600	0.23	0	2,605	0.02	0	0	0	–
United Democratic Party	31,420	0.21	0	24,310	0.16	0	0	0	–
Chama Cha Uzalendo	30,926	0.21	1	38,047	0.25	0	0	1	–1
Kenya African Democratic Union – Asili	27,512	0.18	0	16,458	0.11	0	0	0	–1
Movement for Democracy and Growth	26,940	0.18	0				0	0	–
National Vision Party	26,081	0.17	0	32,868	0.22	0	0	0	–
New Democrats	24,343	0.16	1	22,129	0.15	0	0	1	+1
Kenya Patriots Party	23,785	0.16	2	9,019	0.06	0	0	2	New
Labour Party of Kenya	21,538	0.14	0	32,735	0.22	0	0	0	–
National Agenda Party of Kenya	17,421	0.12	1				0	1	+1
Ukweli Party	16,861	0.11	0				0	0	–
Progressive Party of Kenya	16,762	0.11	0	34,110	0.22	0	0	0	–
Green Congress of Kenya	15,035	0.10	0				0	0	–
Peoples Trust Party	14,535	0.10	0				0	0	–
Farmers Party	13,958	0.09	0				0	0	–
Maendeleo Democratic Party	12,838	0.09	0				0	0	–1
Restore and Build Kenya	12,836	0.09	0	4,539	0.03	0	0	0	–
Safina	11,607	0.08	0	10,542	0.07	0	0	0	–
National Party of Kenya	11,116	0.07	0				0	0	–
Diligence Development Alliance	10,610	0.07	0	9,841	0.06	0	0	0	–
Shirikisho Party of Kenya	9,164	0.06	0				0	0	–
Devolution Party of Kenya	8,561	0.06	0				0	0	–
Federal Party of Kenya	7,605	0.05	0	85,415	0.56	0	0	0	–3
Citizens Convention Party	7,460	0.05	0	45,768	0.30	0	0	0	–
Peoples Party of Kenya	6,802	0.05	0				0	0	–
Kenya Social Congress	6,223	0.04	0	3,091	0.02	0	0	0	–
Social Democratic Party of Kenya	5,634	0.04	0	17,708	0.12	0	0	0	–
Peoples Empowerment Party	4,827	0.03	0				0	0	–
Party of Independent Candidates of Kenya	4,816	0.03	0	17,234	0.11	0	0	0	–
Republican Liberty Party	3,845	0.03	0	1,222	0.01	0	0	0	–
Alternative Leadership Party of Kenya	3,660	0.02	0	3,699	0.02	0	0	0	–
Party of Democratic Unity	3,628	0.02	0	7,760	0.05	0	0	0	–
Agano Party	3,162	0.02	0	27,810	0.18	0	0	0	–
Empowerment and Liberation Party	2,764	0.02	0				0	0	–
National Liberal Party	2,192	0.01	0				0	0	–
Vibrant Democratic Party	1,821	0.01	0	7,541	0.05	0	0	0	–
United Democratic Movement	1,687	0.01	0				0	0	–
Chama Mwangaza Daima	1,244	0.01	0	3,968	0.03	0	0	0	–
Democratic Congress	611	0.00	0				0	0	–
Justice and Freedom Party	527	0.00	0				0	0	–
Kenya National Democratic Alliance	341	0.00	0				0	0	–
Alliance for Real Change	278	0.00	0				0	0	–
Liberal Democratic Party	170	0.00	0				0	0	–
Forum for Republican Democracy	59	0.00	0				0	0	–
Thirdway Alliance Kenya	40	0.00	0	9,131	0.06	0	0	0	–
Roots Party of Kenya	29	0.00	0				0	0	–
Mzalendo Saba Saba Party				3,835	0.03	0	0	0	–
Independent	2,347,061	15.65	13	1,893,666	12.49	1	0	14	+10
Vacant due to death of a candidate			1				–	1	–
Total	14,999,932	100.00	290	15,165,391	100.00	47	12	349	0
Source: IPU, Independent Electoral and Boundaries Commission

=== Governors ===
Three women were elected as governors for the first time for their respective counties – Joyce Laboso of Bomet County, Charity Ngilu of Kitui County, and Anne Waiguru of Kirinyaga County. 25 out of 47 governors lost their seats. 29 of the 47 governors are members of the ruling Jubilee Party.

== Reactions ==
=== Domestic ===
Opposition leader Raila Odinga, alleged that the results had been tampered with by hackers. At that time, he offered no evidence to justify his claim, which the head of Kenya's electoral commission dismissed. Following the election, there were protests in Kisumu, Kibera and Mathare where Odinga enjoys major political support, some of which turned violent and deadly. Odinga published his own results, which put him ahead, and claimed that the commission's IT system had been hacked and that Kenya had seen the worst "voter theft" in its history. The chairman of the electoral commission, Wafula Chebukati, responded that his organisation was the only body allowed to count votes and that while there had been an attempt to hack the commission, it had failed. A week after the vote, Odinga announced he would challenge the results in Kenya's Supreme Court.

The Economist did its own count of a small sample of paper ballots, which tallied with the electronic results.

Kenyatta's reaction incorporated invitations of several world leaders to his inauguration, including: former US President Barack Obama; German Chancellor Angela Merkel; British Prime Minister Theresa May; Italian Prime Minister Matteo Renzi; Chinese President Xi Jinping; Liberian President Ellen Johnson Sirleaf; Nigerian President Muhammadu Buhari; Rwandan President Paul Kagame; Ugandan President Yoweri Museveni; Tanzanian President John Magufuli; South African President Jacob Zuma; His Royal Highness Aga Khan IV; and Nigerian billionaire tycoon Aliko Dangote.

=== International ===
- African Union: The AU mission led by Thabo Mbeki commended the Kenyan people on conducting the election in a peaceful environment. The AU acknowledged the dispute by the opposition, however, Mbeki refused to get involved in the investigation, citing the lack of mandate.
- (United States) Carter Center: The mission headed by John Kerry commended the Kenyan people in conducting the election peacefully. The Carter Center also commended the role of the judiciary throughout the entire electoral process. Kerry, who initially said he was "confident in the integrity of the Kenyan elections and praised the country's election commission for its transparency and diligence", later urged that all disputes with the election be handled within the law.
- Commonwealth of Nations: The Chair of the Commonwealth Observer Group, former President of Ghana John Mahama, declared in the group's interim statement that the Kenyan elections across all six levels of government has been "credible, fair and inclusive". He appealed for continued patience as the results continue to be finalised. On allegations of fraud by the opposition leader, Mahama called for political leaders to show "restraint and magnanimity".
- East African Community: The EAC mission led by Edward Rugumayo also said that the election conducted was free and fair and that the observer team was also satisfied with the Independent Electoral and Boundaries Commission's response to the hacking claims. The commission also appealed for patience towards journalists until the final results are published.
- European Union: The EU observer team deemed the election free and fair, and commended the role of the Independent Electoral and Boundaries Commission. It expressed concern, however, about the high number of spoilt ballots.

== Aftermath ==
On 13 August, police said a total of 16 people have been killed in protests. The post-election violence ultimately resulted in the deaths of up to fifty people and over 100 injuries.

=== Inaugurations ===
It was announced on 13 August that the new Parliament would be sworn in on 22 August, with Kenyatta's second inauguration to follow a week later. However, Kenyatta's inauguration was pushed back to at least 12 September after Odinga agreed to challenge the results in court. It was later announced that the reconvening of the Kenyan parliament was delayed to no later than 7 September due to a petition which was filed by groups affiliated with the Federation of Women Lawyers in Kenya (FIDA- Kenya) over the new parliament's lack of women needed to meet the two-thirds gender rule criteria. Despite the FIDA- Kenya lawsuit, the IEBC announced on 22 August that it will publish the full list of elected Members of the National Assembly and Members of County Assembly later that day and that the gender-rule lawsuit will not be heard in court until 20 September; the IEBC had already published the final results and names of the 47 Governors, Woman Representatives and Senators on 14 August.

The Standard later reported on 22 August that the Kenyan Parliament will reconvene in the next week. On 23 August, Kenyatta issued a decree stating that the Parliament will reconvene on 31 August when they assemble to swear in new members and elect respective Speakers and Deputy Speakers. On 29 August, members-elect of the new Parliament officially underwent the process of registering their political orientation and held their first unofficial meetings in Parliament before being sworn-in. They then met with respective party leaders on 30 August. The 12th Kenyan Parliament was then sworn in on 31 August and various leaders were elected by members of the Kenyan National Assembly and Kenyan Senate to serve their respective houses as well.

=== Supreme Court decision ===
On 28 August, the Kenyan Supreme Court heard Odinga's arguments for the first time. Permission was granted to allow two agents of both the ruling party and Odinga's NASA party to audit the IEBC results. Odinga's lawyer, James Orengo, alleged afterwards that the IEBC was denying his team full access to the servers and other equipment that transmitted results from polling stations to the tallying centre despite the court allowing "read-only" access.

Closing arguments then concluded on 29 August and it was announced that the court would make a decision regarding the results of the presidential election on 1 September. It was later announced on 30 August that the IEBC had submitted all result forms for scrutiny in order to give the Supreme Court a clear picture on how Kenyans voted during the elections.

On 1 September, the Supreme Court nullified Kenyatta's election victory and ordered a new presidential election to take place within 60 days.

On 5 September, the IEBC set the next presidential election to be held on 17 October. Odinga announced that he would not participate in a new presidential election without "legal and constitutional guarantees" against alleged electoral fraud. However, it was later announced on 21 September that the election would be delayed until 26 October after the IEBC sought more time to reform the voting processes. The same day, IEBC Legal Affairs officer, Praxedes Tororey, succumbed to sustained pressure from NASA and resigned from her post.

==== Evidence ====
Evidence was based on examining the forms that represented the stages of vote collection (41,451 of form 34A, 291 of form 34B and one form 34C). The court requested to inspect the originals of all forms.

- Form 34A: 10,438 of the forms, out of a total of 41,451, were missing when the results were declared. Some of the forms, presented by IEBC, were carbon copies while others did not bear the IEBC stamp, and some had the IEBC stamp on a photocopy of the original.
- Form 34B: 10 of the forms were illegible, 56 of them had no watermark, 10 were not signed by the returning officer, and 66 bore no stamp. 31 of the forms had no serial number, and 32 were not signed by party agents.
- Form 34C: had no security features or serial number. "The form looked like a photocopy."

The NASA opposition claimed this jeopardised 7 million votes when the margin of the result was 1.5 million votes.

On 20 September, Justice Philomena Mwilu issued a court statement saying that the IEBC's refusal to provide access and failure to provide information on the IT system's firewall configuration left the court "no choice but to accept the petitioner's claims that the IEBC's IT system was infiltrated and compromised, and the data therein interfered with, or IEBC's officials themselves interfered with the data." A day before the court delivered its statement, Chief Justice David Maraga said judges on the bench had faced death threats since declaring the election results void and criticized the police for "ignoring calls to act."

On 21 September, Kenyatta decried the ruling as a "coup."

==== Calls to prosecute IEBC officials ====
On 22 September, Mathare MP Anthony Olouch, a member of NASA who runs a firm called AT Olouch and Company Advocates, issued a statement to the Director of Public Prosecutions (DPP) Keriako Tobik calling for the prosecution of the following IEBC officials: CEO Ezra Chiloba, Chairman Wafula Chebukati, Betty Nyabuto, Immaculate Kassait, James Muhati, Praxedes Tororey (who has since retired), Moses Kipkogei, Abdi Guliye, Molu Boya and Marjan Hussein Marjan. The letter also stated, "unless investigation leading into criminal charges and prosecution is commenced within 72 hours [by] this office, our instructions are to institute private prosecutions according to Section 28 of the Office of the Director of Public Prosecutions [Act]."

==== Odinga Withdrawal from Second Election ====
On 10 October, Odinga quit the second election, citing problems with the IEBC and withdrawals from his coalition. Odinga strongly believes he cannot go into another election with no reforms in the IEBC.

==== Doubts of Fair Second Presidential Election ====
On 18 October recently resigned IEBC Commissioner, who fled to the United States, issued a statement declaring that the second Kenyan Presidential election would not be a fair election. The same day, IEBC Chairman Wafula Chebukati expressed skepticism about a fair election as well, claiming the IEBC commissioners were partisan-minded and that he resign unless certain conditions are met to reform the IEBC. On 20 October, the IEBC's chief executive officer Ezra Chiloba announced that he will not be monitoring the election and that starting 23 October, he will take a three-week vacation. Chiloba's departure created more uncertainty over who will monitor the election.

On 24 October, the IEBC announced that it would now count back-up paper ballots and not rush to announce the official results based only on numbers sent from the polling stations like in the first Presidential election as well. The same day, Chebukati appointed IEBC Vice Chair Consolata N.B. Maina as the IEBC Deputy National Returning Officer.

Second Petition Filing

Honorable Mwau, Njonjo Mue and Khalef Khalifa filed petitions challenging the declaration at Supreme Court on 8 November.This act triggered political deadlock and uncertainty. President Uhuru Kenyatta launched his 24- page response stating his legally elected and accuses the petitioners for being used as NASA 'agents'. He also stated his acceptance on the verdict made to repeat the elections, and further accused the opposition of frustrating IEBC'S capability of handling the elections and attaching the Jubilee administration of interference in the electoral decisions putting it as propaganda.

He further denied claims of sing state resources for campaigning and involvement of cabinet ministers in his campaign, voter influence, intimidation and corruption during the repeat polls.

NASA defended its withdrawal in the second polls through its Chief Principal Raila Odinga. NASA Co- Principal maintained that the election was a 'sham' and IEBC was at all not independent as its decisions were solemnly made by foreign organs acting as relations officers to the public and the Jubilee Administration.

=== Kenyatta Inauguration ===
Despite challenges to his second victory, Kenyatta was officially sworn in for a second and final term on 28 November.

=== Aftermath ===
In 2022, the head of the 2017 Kenya European Union Election Observation Mission Hannah Roberts, explaining the situation at Oxford University, stated, "The court was under a lot of pressure because of the political tensions that there were between the two sides and also they had a huge amount of evidence that they had to wade through in two weeks so they had an enormous political and practical load on their shoulders. As the days were progressing we could see more of the rationale that they were following and could start to see that possibly they were going to annull this election. For us that was a very key thing that any decision by a court should be something that has a logic is a logical consequence of the legal framework in a country and the evidence of what's actually happened but still when the decision came it was a huge shock for us because it never happened before."

For the court to "demonstrate its ability to operate independently by making a decision against the ruling party it was very difficult on a practical level but of course much better than going to the streets and they're being violent on the streets the other aspect that was very apparent to us was the amount of pressure that was being put on the judiciary throughout the election process in 2017 so before during and after the election when they were subject to extremely harsh criticism extensive complaints and intimidation," she said.

Ugochukwu Ezeh, researcher at Oxford University, called the ruling an "absolutely radical intervention ... but also justifiable based on a plausible reading of the applicable constitutional and statutory frameworks." He also said that the decision did "reverberate beyond Kenya's borders" and that what he "most admired about the decision was the court's emphasis on the need to conceptualize elections as a process not just as a one day event but to assess, evaluate the quality of an electoral contest we need to look at the process leading up to our voting day."
