= 2013 Vihiga local elections =

Local elections in Kenya

Local elections were held in Vihiga to elect a Governor and County Assembly on 4 March 2013. Under the new constitution, which was passed in a 2010 referendum, the 2013 general elections were the first in which Governors and members of the County Assemblies for the newly created counties were elected. They will also be the first general elections run by the Independent Electoral and Boundaries Commission (IEBC) which has released the official list of candidates.

== Gubernatorial election ==
Candidate	Running Mate	Coalition	Party	Votes
Akaranga, Epainitous Moses	Amaswache, Caleb Temba		Progressive Party	--
Amayi, Jarius Boston	Tom, Onacha Kisia		United Democratic Forum Party	--
Butiko, Kennedy Enosi	Saisi, Patrick	Cord	Orange Democratic Movement	--
Lichete, Reuben Kigame	Ayodi, Listone		Restore and Build Kenya	--
Mwanga, Francis Inganji	David, Asiligwa Amuyunza		National Agenda Party	--
Mwanje, Justus Inonda	Ligenga, Hesbon Asava		FORD–Kenya	--
