= Erastus Edung Ethekon =

Kenyan lawyer (born 1977)

Chairperson of the Independent Electoral and Boundaries Commission
- Incumbent
- Assumed office 11 July 2025
- Appointed by: William Ruto
- Preceded by: Wafula Chebukati

County Attorney of Turkana County
- In office 2018–2024
- Governor: Josphat Nanok
- Preceded by: Inaugural
- Succeeded by: Ruth Emanikor

Personal details
- Born: 1977 (age 48–49) Turkana, Kenya
- Education: University of Nairobi (LLB); University of Derby (LLM); University of Liverpool (MSc); Jaume I University (MA)
- Profession: Lawyer

Erastus Edung Lokaale Ethekon (born 1977) is the current chairperson of the Independent Electoral and Boundaries Commission of Kenya.

== Early childhood and education ==
Ethekon was born in 1977 in Turkana. He enrolled at Starehe Boys’ Centre and School in 1991 and completed in 1995. He later studied law at the University of Nairobi, graduating with a Bachelor of Laws in 2001 and obtained a postgraduate diploma in law from the Kenya School of Law in 2003.

In 2007, he received a postgraduate certificate in the Implementation of International Human Rights Treaties from the University of Nottingham under the Chevening Scholarship. He afterwards earned a Master of Arts in Peace, Conflict and Development Studies from Universidad Jaume I in Spain in 2012, a Master of Science in Project Management from the University of Liverpool in 2013, and a Master of Laws in Oil, Gas and Energy Law from the University of Derby in 2016.

His 2016 dissertation was titled, Evaluating Legal, Political and Commercial Risks in the Emerging Oil and Gas Sector in Kenya.

== Career ==
Ethekon served as the county attorney for Turkana County from 2018 to 2024.

He has also held positions with the United Nations Development Program, as a programme advisor at the regional service centre in Addis Ababa and as a chief technical advisor in Kenya.

He is currently the chairperson of the Independent Electoral and Boundaries Commission, taking over from Wafula Chebukati. After his nomination and subsequent parliamentary approval, he was sworn in on 11 July 2025. Prior to his appointment, he was serving as the lead expert and programme advisor for the Africa Union Development Agency NEPAD programme on governance, peace, security and development, based in South Africa.

== See also ==
- Independent Electoral and Boundaries Commission
