= Marjan Hussein Marjan =

Kenyan business executive (born 1979)

Chief Executive Officer and Commission Secretary, IEBC
- In office 8 March 2022 – 3 February 2026
- Preceded by: Ezra Chiloba
- Succeeded by: Moses Ledama Sunkuli (acting)

Personal details
- Born: 1979 (age 46–47)
- Citizenship: Kenya
- Education: University of Nairobi (B.Com, MBA); ICPAK (CPA(K))
- Occupation: Chief Executive

Marjan Hussein Marjan (born in 1979) was the Chief Executive Officer at Kenya's Electoral Agency IEBC from 2022 up to his resignation on 3 February 2026. He was confirmed to the post in 8 March 2022 after being picked from a short list of five candidates, and sworn in after a week. Until then, he held the CEO's post in an acting capacity for five years since the exit of Ezra Chiloba in 2017.

== Personal life ==
He obtained a Bachelor of Commerce degree and a Master of Business Administration (MBA) in Strategic Management from the University of Nairobi. And several professional certifications like Certified Public Accountant of Kenya (CPA-K), Information Systems Auditor (CISA), Certified Internal Auditor (CIA), Control Self-Assessment specialist (CCSA), and Certified Quality Assessor (CQA).

== Career ==
Marjan worked at Telkom Kenya for over 20 years as the Head of Internal Audit, Investigation, and Quality. Thereafter, he joined the IEBC in March 2015 after being appointed as Deputy CEO in Charge of Support Services in place of Wilson Sholei. He was then appointed as the Lead Coordinator at the same entity before stepping up to be the acting CEO back on 5 Sep 2017. What followed next was his full elevation as CEO on 8 March 2022. Part of his intray after that appointment was overseeing the 2022 Kenyan general election.
