= Thomas Letangule =

Kenyan lawyer

Thomas Letangule (born 11 December 1968) is a Kenyan constitutional and human rights lawyer and former commissioner at the Independent Electoral and Boundaries Commission (IEBC) of the Republic of Kenya from November 2011 to 2016.

== Early life ==
Letangule was born on 11 December 1968 in Ng'ambo, a small village South West of Lake Baringo. He went to Ng'ambo Primary School and Later Perkerra Primary School. He attended Marigat High school in 1984 before proceeding to Sacho High School for O-levels completing in 1989 and then joined the University of Nairobi to pursue a degree in Law; he graduated from the University of Nairobi Law School in 1993. Thereafter went for pupilage, before proceeding to obtain the Kenya School of Law Diploma in Legal Practice. He was admitted to the Bar as an Advocate of the High Court of Kenya on 20 June 1996.

== Career ==
He went into private legal practice founding his firm, Letangule & Company Advocates in October 2004.

In the March 2013 General Elections he chaired the IEBC Dispute Resolutions Tribunal handling over 2000 complaints from political parties nominations.

In 2017, his bank accounts were frozen pending the hearing of a case filed by former Telkom employees.

In 2020, he received Sh2.6 million compensation for medical negligence leading to the death of his wife, Esther, in childbirth in 2013.

He self-published an autobiography, Trailblazer, in 2017; it was the subject of an MA dissertation from the University of Nairobi.

== Selected publications ==
- Letangule, Thomas (2017). Trailblazer. Thomas Letangule. ISBN 9789966103567.
