= Joshua Odongo =

Kenyan politician

Joshua Odongo Onono was a Kenyan running for Deputy President in the March 2013 Kenyan Presidential election on an Alliance of Real Change party ticket. He was the running mate to Mohammed Abduba Dida.
