= Wafula Chebukati =

Kenyan lawyer (1961–2025)

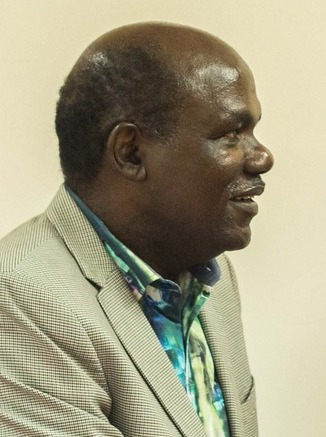
- Chebukati in 2024
- Born: 19 December 1961; Nanyuki County, Colony and Protectorate of Kenya
- Died: 20 February 2025 (aged 63); Nairobi, Kenya
- Citizenship: Kenya
- Education: University of Nairobi (LLB); Kenya School of Law (PGDip); JKUAT (MBA)
- Occupation: Lawyer
- Known for: Corporate Law, Commercial Law, Corporate Governance, Dispute Resolution
- Title: Former Chairperson, IEBC
- Spouse: Mary Chebukati Wanyonyi

Wafula Wanyonyi Chebukati (19 December 1961 – 20 February 2025) was a Kenyan lawyer most known for serving as chairman of the Independent Electoral and Boundaries Commission (IEBC), which is responsible for overseeing elections in Kenya. Wafula Chebukati was appointed to the position on a six-year tenure in January 2017 by the retired president of Kenya Uhuru Kenyatta. Following his appointment in 2017, he succeeded Ahmed Issack Hassan. He retired on 17 January 2023, following the end of his term. He led Kenya through two heavily contested and controversial general elections; August 2017 and 2022 General Elections.

His tenure at Kenya's electoral body was also one marred with resignation of IEBC commissioners, including his deputies, who faulted his leadership.

== Career ==
Chebukati was a Kenyan lawyer with many years of experience. He ran his sole proprietorship law firm for 20 years and thereafter in 2006 he founded a Nairobi-based partnership law firm, Cootow & Associates Advocates, which he resigned from on 17 January 2017, prior to taking up the job as a State Officer in accordance with the law and in order to avoid conflict of interest. In 2017, he was accused of conflict of interest by fronting his law firm for contracts at the IEBC but the matter was dismissed by Parliament for lack of evidence. He was a politician and member of the Orange Democratic Movement party, which he resigned from before applying for the position of Chairperson of IEBC. In 2007, he contested for the Saboti Constituency parliamentary seat and came in second place.

=== IEBC Tenure ===
In January 2017, he was appointed chairperson of the IEBC. During his tenure he managed three Kenyan elections: the 2017 Kenyan general election, October 2017 Kenyan presidential election and the 2022 Kenyan general election.

On 17 January 2023, Chebukati became the first chairperson of the IEBC to successfully complete the 6-year constitutional term. Chebukati was awarded Elder of the order of the Golden Heart (EGH) – Kenya's second highest award given to a civilian – by the president of Kenya.

Seven months following his appointment at the IEBC, he oversaw the 2017 elections that saw the Supreme Court of Kenya historically nullify the presidential election results over electoral irregularities and illegalities. During this period he had also lost two of his commissioners; Roslyn Akombe and his CEO Ezra Chiloba.

In 2018, IEBC Vice Chair Connie Nkatha Maina, together with fellow commissioners Margaret Mwachanya and Paul Kurgat, stood down from the electoral organising body citing the inability of the Commission's chairman Wafula Chebukati to lead IEBC effectively.

During the 2022 presidential election, Chebukati found himself at the center of intense political controversy. As the head of the IEBC, he was responsible for overseeing the election that saw William Ruto declared the winner against Raila Odinga. However, the results were heavily contested, with Odinga and his supporters alleging electoral fraud and irregularities. The situation escalated when four out of the seven IEBC commissioners disowned the final results, citing lack of transparency in the tallying process. Chebukati, however, maintained that the election was conducted fairly and stood by the results, a decision that led to threats, legal battles, and heightened political tensions in the country. The Supreme Court eventually upheld Ruto's victory, but the disputed election further divided public opinion on Chebukati's legacy as an election official.

== Personal life and death ==
Wafula Chebukati was born in Bungoma County on 22 December 1961. He was an alumnus of St Peters School Mumias, Bokoli Secondary school and Lenana School.

Chebukati held a Bachelor of Law degree from the University of Nairobi, and Master of Business Administration from the JKUAT. He was a member of LSK, Institute of Certified Secretaries, and ICJ.

He was married to Mary Wanyonyi, who was in 2023 nominated by President Ruto as the chairperson of the Commission of Revenue Allocation.

Chebukati became critically ill in 2024, and died in Nairobi on 21 February 2025, at the age of 63.
