= Ahmed Issack Hassan =

Kenyan lawyer and civil servant

Mr Ahmed Issack Hassan E.B.S.
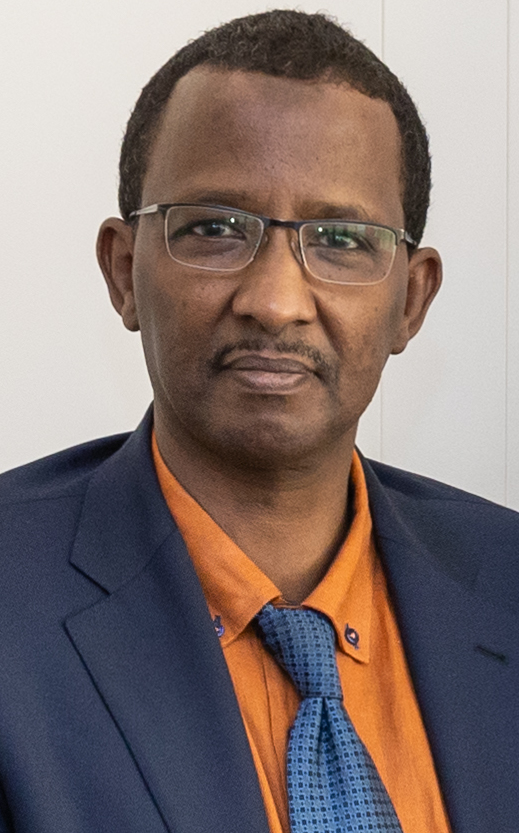
- Ahmed Issack Hassan in 2023
- President: Emilio Mwai Kibaki
- Prime Minister: Raila Odinga
- Vice President: Kalonzo Musyoka
- Vice PM: Musalia Mudavadi; Uhuru Kenyatta

Personal details
- Education: University of Nairobi
- Website: www.ahmedissackhassan.com

Ahmed Issack Hassan (born March 2, 1970) is an Advocate of the High Court of Kenya and a public servant. He was the Chairperson of the Independent Electoral and Boundaries Commission (IEBC) of the Republic of Kenya from November 2011 to October 6, 2016.

== Early life ==
Isaack was born in Bura, Garissa, Kenya and grew up in a pastoralist family. He attended Garissa High School in 1988 before proceeding to the University of Nairobi, where he graduated from in 1992 with a bachelor's degree in law. Thereafter he proceeded to obtain a post-graduate diploma in Legal Practice from the Kenya School of Law in 1994. He was admitted to the bar as an Advocate of the High Court of Kenya on 23 February 1995. He later went into private legal practice.

== Career ==
Issack served as the Chairperson of the Interim Independence Electoral Commission (IIEC) from May 2009 to November 2011. He was appointed on November 9, 2011 to chair the electoral body comprising eight Commissioners following a recommendation by Parliament.

As a practicing lawyer, Issack specialized in commercial and constitutional Law. He worked as an associate advocate, partner and managing partner in the law firm of Messrs Ibrahim, Issack & Co. Advocates until May 2009. He served as a Commissioner on the Constitution of Kenya Review Commission (CKRC) from 2000 to 2005. In June 2006, he was appointed by President Mwai Kibaki to serve on a Presidential Commission of Inquiry to inquire into breaches of national security by Artur Margaryan and Artur Sargasyan. He also worked as a legal consultant for the United Nations Political Office for Somalia (UNPOS), training Somali parliamentarians on constitutionalism and federalism in Baidoa, Somalia in 2006.

Issack also served as Legal Consultant for UNDP-Somalia on the Somalia Constitution Making Project from June to December 2008. Between June 2006 and May 2009, he served as a General Legal Counsel for the Transitional Federal Government of Somalia. During the same period, he also served as a Special Legal Adviser to the Transitional President of the Transitional Federal Government of Somalia, Abdullahi Yusuf.

In April 2011, he was the Head of the AU Observer Mission to Nigerian elections. In December 2012, he was the Head of the EISA Observer Mission to Ghanaian elections. In December 2010, Hassan was awarded the Uwiano Platform Award by the UN and the Kenyan National Cohesion & Integration Commission. In December 2010, he was awarded a National Honour titled the Order of the Elder of the Burning Spear Second Class, conferred by the President of the Republic of Kenya for "rendering exemplary services to the nation."

He has served as Chair of the East African Community – Electoral Commission Forum (EAC – ECF) based in Arusha, and a member of the Executive Committee of the COMESA Electoral Commission Forum based in Lusaka. He is the chairman of the Executive Council of the Association of African Election Authorities (AAEA) based in Accra. He also served on the Executive Board of the Association of World Election Bodies (A-WEB) based in Seoul and was also the Chairperson of the Commonwealth Electoral Network Steering Committee (CEN – SC), based in London. Issack preceded Mark Ramkerrysingh.

Issack was appointed the chairperson of the board of the Independent Policing Oversight Authority (IPOA) by president William Ruto in December 2024. He resigned from the position on 17 February 2026 stepping down following his appointment as a Judge of the Court of Appeal.
