= Ann Nderitu =

Kenyan registrar

Dr. Ann Nderitu CBS
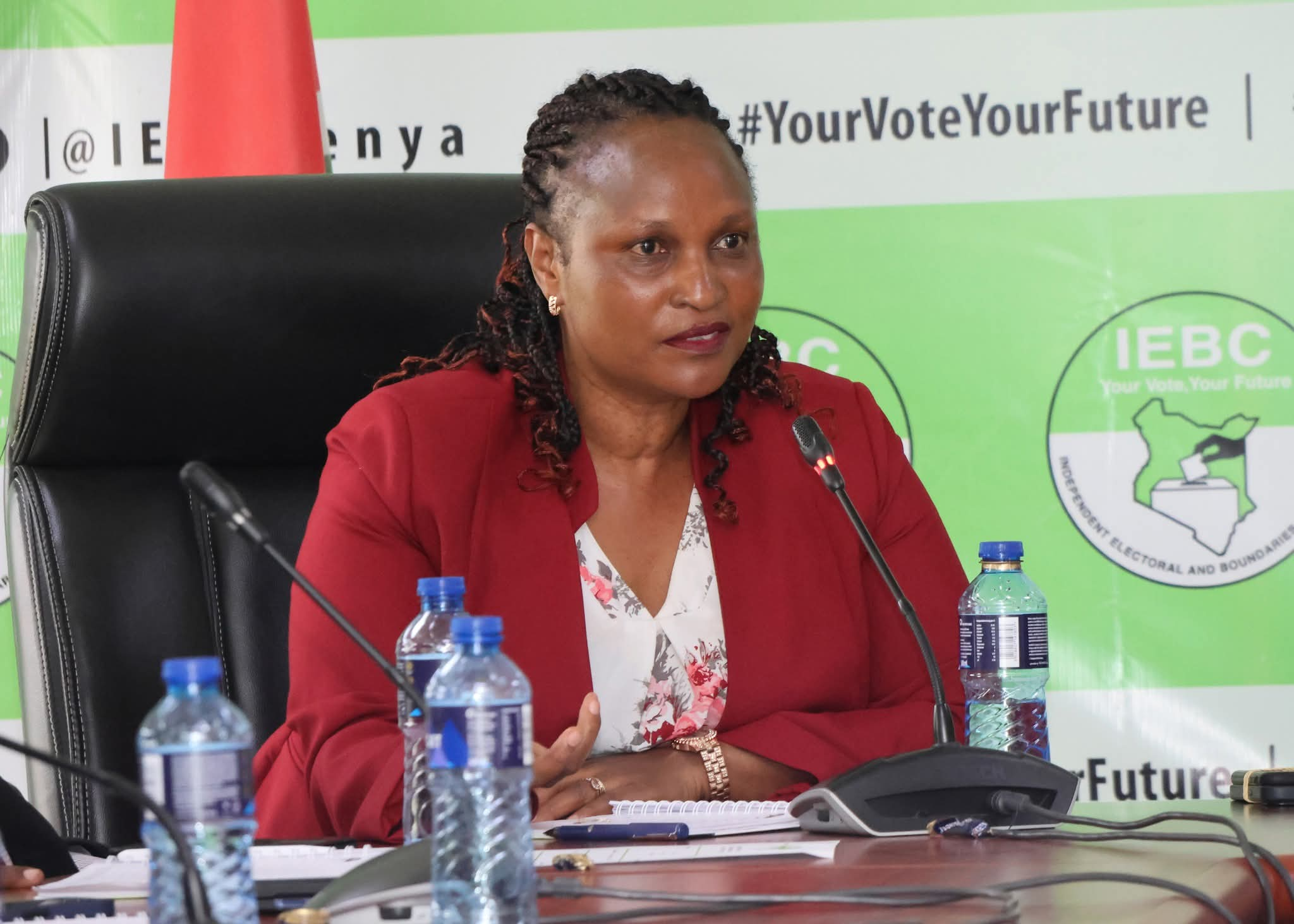
- Ann Nderitu
- Born: Nyandarua District, Kenya
- Citizenship: Kenyan
- Education: Bachelor of Education in English and Literature, Moi University (1995); Master of Arts in Linguistics, University of Nairobi (2007)
- Occupation: Public administrator
- Office: Commissioner of the Independent Electoral and Boundaries Commission
- Awards: Moran of the Order of the Burning Spear (2017); Chief of the Order of the Burning Spear (2022); Trailblazer Presidential Award for Women in Leadership (TPAW) -2023; Utumishi Bora Award for Outstanding Leadership (UBA) - 2024
- Website: https://www.annnderitu.co.ke

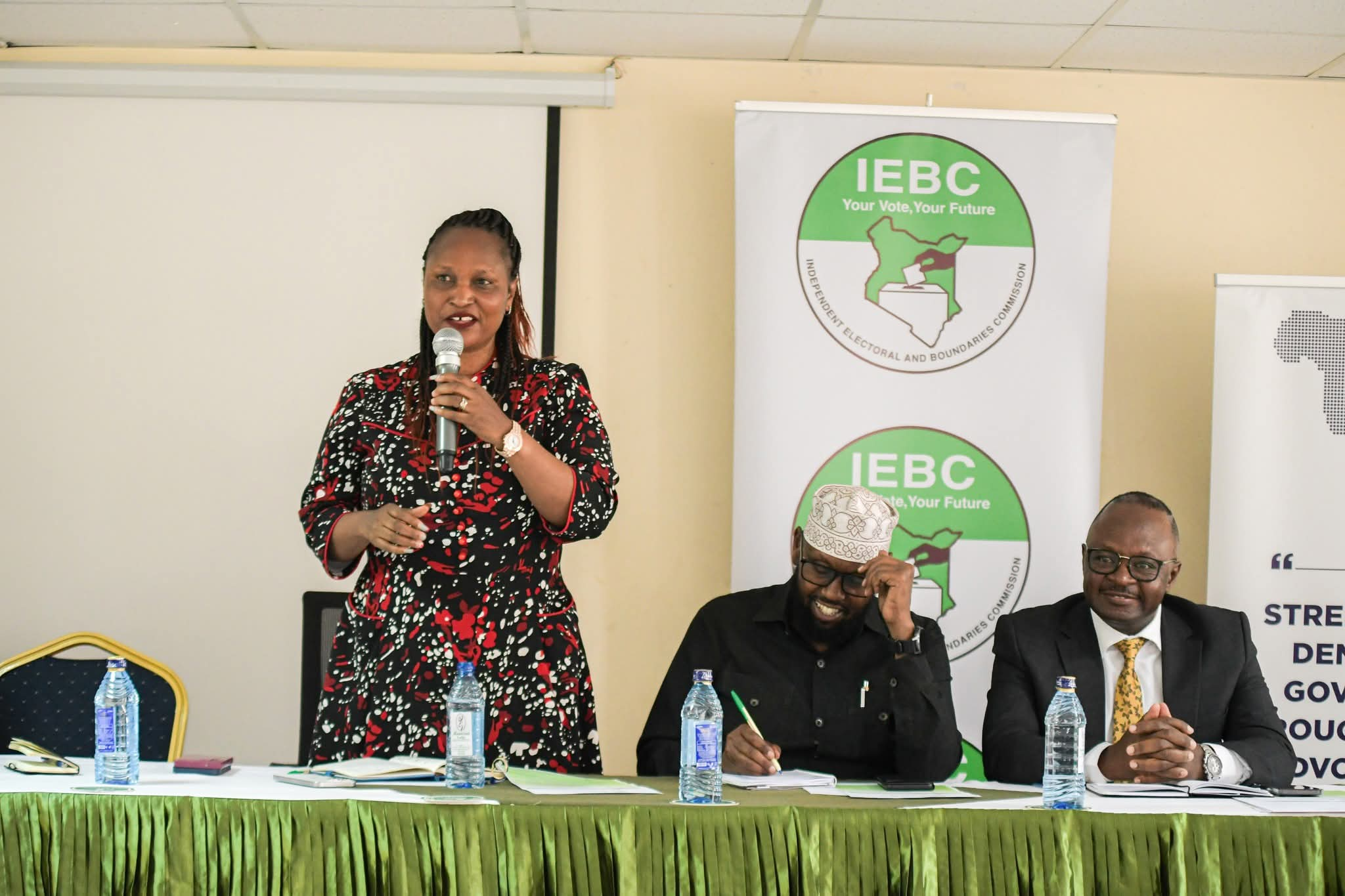

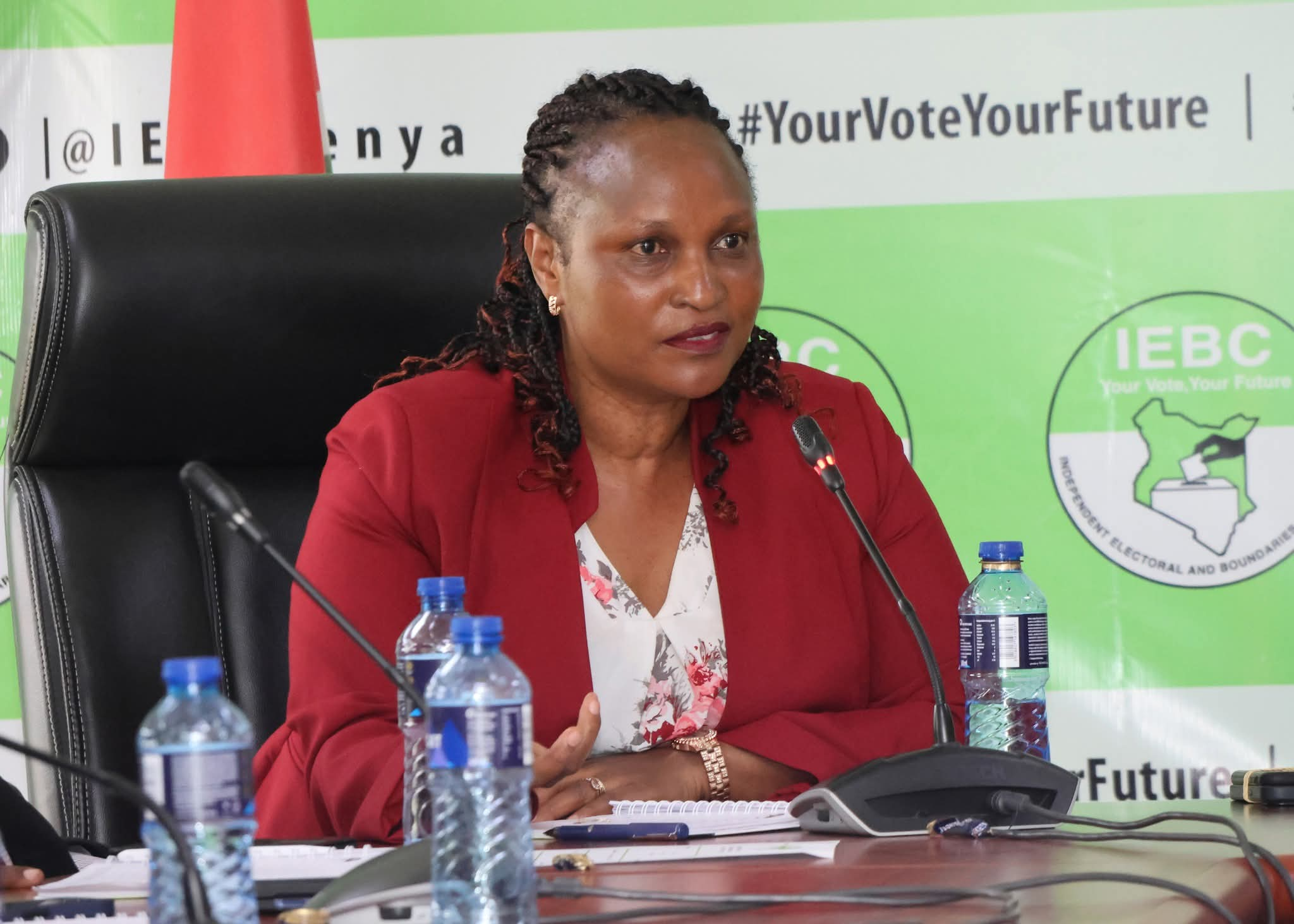

Ann Nderitu, CBS is a Kenyan public administrator who has served as a Commissioner of the Independent Electoral and Boundaries Commission (IEBC) since 2025.

== Career ==
Dr. Ann Nderitu, CBS, is an elections and governance specialist with over two decades of distinguished public service. She currently serves as a Commissioner at the Independent Electoral and Boundaries Commission (IEBC), where she chairs the Elections Operations Technical Committee overseeing the planning and management of electoral operations. Her 2025 appointment was historic the first time a former IEBC staff member was elevated to Commissioner within the same institution.

Previously, she served an eight-year tenure as Registrar of Political Parties and CEO of the Office of the Registrar of Political Parties (ORPP), leading transformative institutional reforms that positioned the ORPP as a regional benchmark in political party governance. She is an accredited BRIDGE Facilitator, a published author, has developed over 20 training manuals, and has participated in election observation missions across more than 25 countries.

Her career began in education, rising from Schools Inspector to one of the youngest District Education Officers, with notable contributions to curriculum development and teacher training. She also served on the National Taskforce for implementing Kenya's two-thirds gender rule and is a committed advocate for the inclusion of youth, persons with disabilities, and marginalized communities.

Dr. Ann Nderitu, CBS expertise spans corporate governance, mediation and conflict resolution, human resource management, and transformative leadership, among other areas. She is highly skilled in linguistics and communication, education and training, public administration, and project management. Her standing in leadership and governance has been formally recognized through an honorary doctorate conferred by Commonwealth University, London Graduate School.

Her exemplary service has been recognized with several prestigious Presidential National Awards.

Dr. Ann Nderitu, CBS has held roles across, education, political party regulation, and electoral management over more than two decades of public service. Her work in these areas has contributed to institutional development in Kenya's political and electoral systems, and she is recognized within these fields for her focus on inclusive processes and credible governance..

== Education ==
She attained a Bachelor of Education English and Literature from Moi University in 1995, a Master of Arts in Linguistics from the University of Nairobi in 2007 and a Diploma in Public Administration from the Galilee Institute of Management, Israel in 2018.

== Awards and honours ==
Ann Nderitu's awards include:

- Moran of Burning Spear (MBS) - 2017.
- Chief of Burning Spear (CBS) - 2022.
- Trailblazer Presidential Award for Women in Leadership (TPAW) -2023.
- Utumishi Bora Award for Outstanding Leadership (UBA) - 2024.
