= Mohammed Abduba Dida =

Kenyan teacher

Alliance for Real Change candidate for President of Kenya
- Running mate: Joshua Odongo
- Opponent: Seven
- Incumbent: Mwai Kibaki

Personal details
- Born: 1974 (age 51–52) Wajir District
- Citizenship: Kenyan
- Party: ARC
- Spouse(s): Amina; Estail; Rukia
- Relations: 3
- Children: 12
- Education: Kenyatta University
- Occupation: Businessman
- Profession: Teacher

Mohammed Abduba Dida (born 1974) is a Kenyan teacher who vied for the country's presidency in the 2013 General Election on an Alliance of Real Change party ticket. Dida ran again in the 2017 General Election, conceding hours before the election was called in favour of the incumbent; President Uhuru Kenyatta, but at the same time calling into question the integrity of the election and the conduct of the two main political parties; Jubilee and Nasa.

Dida was not well known prior to his presentation of papers to the IEBC. He previously taught English Literature and Religion at Lenana School and Daadab Secondary School at the refugee camp. In 2013, Dida garnered 52,848 votes representing 0.43% of the popular vote.

He has been incarcerated at Big Muddy River Correctional Center since 2022, serving a 7-year sentence after being found guilty of stalking and intimidation.
