= James Ole Kiyiapi =

Kenyan academic (born 1961)

Professor James Ole Kiyiapi

Permanent Secretary at the Ministry of Education
- In office 2010–2012

Permanent Secretary at the Ministry of Medical Services
- In office 2008–2010

Permanent Secretary at the Ministry of Environment and Natural Resources
- In office 2006–2008

Personal details
- Born: 17 May 1961 (age 65) Trans Mara District, Kenya
- Party: RBK
- Education: Moi University (BSc), (MSc); University of Toronto (PhD)
- Profession: Professor
- Positions: Lecturer, Moi University (1994–2006)

James Ole Kiyiapi is a Kenyan academic and politician. In the 2013 Kenyan general elections, Ole kiyiapi vied for the seat of president under the Restore and Build Kenya Party.

== Early life ==
James Ole Kiyiapi was born on 17 May 1961 at Osupuko Location Transmara District, Kenya. His origin was a humble background. His father, Daudi ole Kapur belonged to the Ilnyangusi age set and had two wives with Kiyiapi's mother, Naomi being the second. Kiyiapi is the last born of Naomi's six children. As a boy, he grew up herding his fathers flock and lived a typical village life.

== Education ==
Ole Kiyiapi holds a Doctor of Philosophy degree (PhD) in Forestry from the University of Toronto. He also has a Master and Bachelor of Science degrees from Moi University.

== Career ==
Prior to entering the race for the presidency of Kenya he served as a permanent secretary in the Ministries of Education and Local Government. He also previously served as an associate professor at Moi University.
