= Rose Njeri =

Kenyan software developer

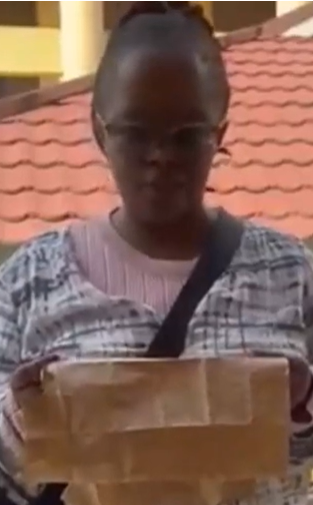
- Njeri in 2025
- Born: 1989-1990; Kenya
- Occupations: coder; activist
- Known for: "Civic Email" tool and subsequent arrest

Rose Njeri Tunguru (born 1989–1990) is a Kenyan coder and activist. She became known for her creation of "Civic Email," a digital tool aimed at helping Kenyans email officials expressing opposition to the Kenyan Finance Bill 2025, for which she was subsequently arrested. Her arrest sparked national outrage and protest. She was named as a Time 100 Next in 2025.

== Biography ==
Tunguru resides in an apartment in Embakasi, Nairobi, and earned a bachelor's degree in commerce. She subsequently began learning web development through She Codes, Harvard Online, and Alt Africa.

On May 19, 2025, Tunguru announced on X that she "wrote a simple program that lets you reject the Finance Bill 2025 with just one click". The tool was called "Civic Email". The launch coincided with public discontent over the Kenyan Finance Bill 2025, and could be used to help citizens voice their objections to that tax law. On May 31, she was arrested during a graduation ceremony, and her devices were confiscated. She has stated that she was "never read her rights" and was detained for 88 hours due to the weekend and a public holiday.

She was officially charged with unauthorized interference with a computer system for, according to prosecutors, "interfering with the normal functioning of government systems" by making her tool which "automatically generated and sent mass emails." She was subsequently released on bond. Video footage captured her smiling, which went viral on social media.

Her case led to a national outcry, a trending hashtag of #FreeRoseNjeri and activists protesting outside her jail. She received support from organizations including Amnesty International Kenya and attorneys including former Chief Justice of Kenya David Maraga. The case against her was ultimately dismissed by a magistrate, who also ordered her devices returned. However, she has stated that her devices still have not been returned, and that officers have attempted to arrest her again since. Since then, she has described herself as a "civic tech activist."

In 2026, she launched a new tool called Tuma Report, a platform allowing users to submit reports of events. She has stated she was inspired to create this by the clashes in Kakamega County, where households were meant to be displaced by gold mining, which she has stated was not reported by news media.

She was named as a Time 100 Next in 2025. She has also been named to the 40 under 40 list by Business Daily Africa.

== Personal life ==
Tunguru has anemia, which she has stated was worsened by her time being detained. She has two children.
