= David Maraga =

14th Chief Justice of the Republic of Kenya

Justice David Maraga E.G.H.
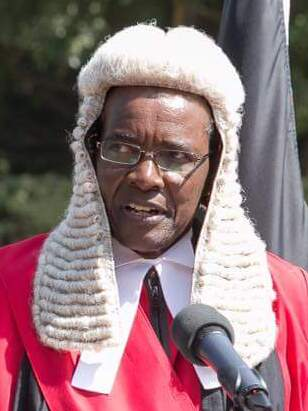
- Maraga being sworn in on 19 October 2016

14th Chief Justice of Kenya
- In office 19 October 2016 – 12 January 2021
- Nominated by: Judicial Service Commission (Kenya)
- Appointed by: Uhuru Kenyatta
- Preceded by: Willy Mutunga
- Succeeded by: Martha Koome

Judge, Court of Appeal
- In office January 2012 – October 2016

Presiding Judge, Court of Appeal, Kisumu
- In office October 2014 – October 2016

Personal details
- Born: David Kenani Maraga; 12 January 1951 (age 75) Bonyamatuta, South Nyanza District, Nyanza Province, Kenya
- Spouse: Yucabeth Nyaboke
- Children: 3
- Education: UoN (LL.B); UoN (LL.M)

David Kenani Maraga (born 12 January 1951) is a Kenyan lawyer and jurist. He was the 14th Chief Justice and President of the Supreme Court of Kenya from October 2016 until his retirement in January 2021.

== Early life and education ==
Maraga was born in Bonyamatuta, South Nyanza District in Nyanza Province (present-day Nyamira County), on 12 January 1951. He attended Sironga DEB Primary School from 1961 to 1967 for his Certificate of Primary Education (CPE), Maranda High School from 1968 to 1971 for his East African School Certificate (O Level), and Kisii High School from 1972 to 1973 for his East African Advanced Certificate of Education (A Level).

He studied law at the University of Nairobi, and was awarded a Bachelor of Laws in 1977. He also holds a post-graduate diploma awarded in 1978 by the Kenya School of Law. He was admitted to the Kenyan bar in October 1978.

He later obtained a Master of Laws from the University of Nairobi in 2011.

== Legal career ==
Following his admission to the Kenyan bar in 1978, David Maraga ran a private law practice for over 25 years in Nakuru, specializing in civil and criminal litigation as well as conveyancing. He served from 1987 to 1989 as the chairperson of the Rift Valley Law Society.

=== Judicial Career in the High Court and Court of Appeal ===
==== High Court ====
Justice Maraga joined the bench as a High Court Judge in October 2003 having been appointed by President Mwai Kibaki. Subsequently, he served as a judge of the High Court in Mombasa (2003–2007), Nakuru (2008–2010), and Nairobi (2010–2011).

He also served in various leadership roles, including as the resident judge, High Court of Kenya in Nakuru from May 2009 to August 2010 and as the presiding judge of the Family Division of the High Court in Nairobi from April 2010 to December 2011.

==== Vetting ====
Since he was appointed to a judicial office before the 2010 Constitution of Kenya came into force, Justice Maraga went through the mandatory vetting by the Judges & Magistrates Vetting Board in 2012. The Vetting Board unanimously declared him fit to continue serving in office, though his vetting took a dramatic twist when he demanded a Bible and swore before the vetting panel that he had never taken a bribe in his judicial career and would never take bribes in the future.

==== Court of Appeal ====
He was elevated to the Court of Appeal in January 2012 following an interview process by the Judicial Service Commission.

A year after joining the Court of Appeal, he vied for the position of President of the Court of Appeal, losing by a solitary vote to Justice Paul Kihara Kariuki, who served as the President of the court before his appointment as the Attorney-General.

Justice Maraga served in the Court of Appeal in Nairobi from January 2012 to September 2014, and as the presiding judge of the Court of Appeal in Kisumu from October 2014 until his appointment as the Chief Justice two years later.

==== Judiciary Committee on Elections ====
Justice Maraga was appointed by retired Chief Justice Willy Mutunga in May 2012 as the vice chair of the Kenya Judiciary Working Committee on Election Preparations (JWCEP) which was constituted to ensure the judiciary was fully prepared to deal in a timely manner, with any disputes that would arise from the March 2013 General Election.

As a result of the committee's work, the judiciary was in position to deal with all election petitions within the strict statutory timelines. The committee was thus reconstituted in August 2015 as a standing Committee and renamed the Judiciary Committee on Elections (JCE) with Justice Maraga as chairperson.

==== Joseph Mutava judicial misconduct tribunal ====
In 2013, the President of Kenya named Justice Maraga as the chair of a tribunal which was constituted to investigate the conduct of High Court Judge Joseph Mutava after the Judicial Service Commission recommended a tribunal to investigate complaints that the Judge had been compromised to deliver a judgment which cushioned Goldenberg suspect Kamlesh Pattni from prosecution over his involvement in the Goldenberg scandal.

The tribunal's work was delayed when the Judge challenged its constitutionality in the High Court, but was finally able to complete its work in September 2016. The tribunal submitted a report in September 2016, recommending to the president that Justice Mutava be removed from office for improperly allocating himself the Kamlesh Pattni file when it did not fall under his docket, and proceeding to write a judgment in the case even though the Judicial Service Commission was investigating his conduct.

Justice Mutava challenged the findings of the tribunal before the Supreme Court but the highest court affirmed his removal in a March 2019 decision. Justice Maraga abstained from these proceedings at the Supreme Court having chaired the tribunal that recommended the dismissal of the Justice Mutava.

=== Appointment to the Office of Chief Justice of Kenya ===
Following the voluntary early retirement of Dr. Willy Mutunga in June 2016, Justice Maraga was among the ten people who applied to replace him. Judge Maraga emerged victorious from a list of eminent judges, legal practitioners and scholars, including law professor Makau Mutua, Supreme Court of Kenya Judges Jackton Ojwang and Smokin Wanjala, East Africa Court of Justice Judge Aaron Ringera and his Court of Appeal colleague Alnashir Visram.

==== Parliamentary vetting and confirmation hearing ====
Having been nominated for appointment by the Judicial Service Commission, his name was forwarded to the president, who transmitted it to the National Assembly for vetting before formal appointment. The National Assembly voted unanimously to approve his appointment as the Chief Justice on 18 October 2016.

==== Official appointment and oath of office ====
He was officially appointed by President Uhuru Kenyatta on 19 October 2016, when he took the oath of office as the 14th chief justice of independent Kenya and the second chief justice in Kenya's new constitutional dispensation. Unlike his predecessor Willy Mutunga, who showed up for his oath wearing a normal suit, Maraga took his oath of office in full judicial regalia.

=== Tenure as Chief Justice and President of the Supreme Court ===
==== Nullification of 2017 presidential election ====
Joined by Deputy Chief Justice Philomena Mwilu and associate justices Isaac Lenaola and Dr Smokin Wanjala (with Justices Njoki Ndung'u and Prof. J. B. Ojwang' dissenting), Chief Justice David Maraga made history by nullifying the August 2017 presidential election because of illegalities and irregularities that were presented by the petitioners. President Kenyatta was in the lead with 54% of the vote, but opponent Raila Odinga reported the evidence of the hacking to the Supreme Court. The Chief Justice ruling acquitted Kenyatta of any misconduct. The supporters of the president were disappointed with the ruling, while many Kenyans praised the ruling against President Uhuru Kenyatta, and restoring the independence of the judiciary. After issuing veiled threats against the Supreme Court Judges, President Kenyatta told media outlets that he does not agree with a ruling that disappointed millions of his supporters, but he would respect and tolerate the ruling.

While the Chief Justice and the rest of the Supreme Court Judges who nullified the 2017 presidential election were subjected to verbal attacks by the President, who called them crooks and his supporters, this decision earned Maraga tremendous respect from people who praised him for his bravery and was a key pillar of his legacy as the Chief Justice. He is particularly remembered for stating in the brief ruling nullifying the election that "The greatness of any nation lies in its fidelity to the Constitution and adherence to the rule of law and, above all, respect to God."

==== Advisory on the dissolution of Kenya's Parliament ====
On 21 September 2020, Maraga issued an advisory calling on the President to dissolve Kenya's Parliament owing to the failure by Parliament to enact legislation which would give effect to a provision in Kenya's Constitution that requires gender quotas in all public bodies. Under the 2010 Constitution, Kenya's Parliament had five years to enact legislation ensuring that no more than two-thirds of members of elective public bodies be of the same gender. The 2010 Constitution gives the Chief Justice the power to issue an advisory to the President to dissolve Parliament if a court has declared that Parliament has failed to enact any of the laws required to give full effect to the Constitution within the timelines provided in the Constitution. These laws, and the timelines within which they are to be enacted by Parliament, are listed in the Fifth Schedule to the Constitution.

The Two-thirds Gender Rule had been the subject of years of litigation by civil society organizations which resulted in numerous Court Orders requiring Parliament to pass the law but the House did not enact any such legislation despite several extensions of the original 5-year deadline. While the High Court issued orders freezing the advisory, this move worsened the relations between the Executive headed by President Kenyatta and the judiciary under Maraga's leadership.

==== Petitions seeking removal over misconduct ====
Chief Justice David Maraga was the subject of several petitions inviting the Judicial Service Commission to remove him from office over gross misconduct. One such petition was filed in March 2019 by Yusuf Dimbil through lawyer Charles Koech on grounds that the Chief Justice allegedly attended Jubilee Party's political rallies, employed people from his ethnic Kisii group in the judiciary and made unconstitutional utterances. Maraga had earlier been spotted attending a Jubilee Party rally headlined by President Kenyatta and his Deputy William Ruto in Kisii. He was also accused of tribalism, employing only members of his Kisii tribe in his office. The petition claimed that nearly 85% of the staff in the Office of the Chief Justice under Maraga were from his Kisii ethnic group. These included his chief of staff, personal assistant, legal counsel, secretaries and other staff.

In August 2019, Francis Obilo filed a petition seeking the removal of the Chief Justice over his failure to name a three judge bench to hear a case that had been filed against the judiciary over the institution's failure to pay rent for a building which had been leased to house the Court of Appeal. In 2013, the judiciary entered into a six-year lease agreement of Elgon Place in Upper Hill for an annual rent of Sh603.6 million to be used by the Court of Appeal. However, the building went unoccupied because the judges declined to occupy office spaces citing potential radiation risks.

Another petition seeking Maraga's removal was filed in March 2020 by activist Okiya Omtata who alleged that the Chief Justice had interfered with the independence of a judge in discharging his judicial functions by removing an active case file from the judge while judgment was pending. The activist had filed a case in the Employment & Labour Relations Court to challenge a move by the government to re-advertise the vacancy for the auditor general. On the day the Court was to deliver judgment, the presiding judge informed the parties that he had not been able to prepare the judgment since the Chief Justice had called for the file from his docket for unexplained reasons.

Yet another petition was filed in June 2020 by an activist who alleged that the Chief Justice had breached the Code of Conduct when he made public utterances condemning President Kenyatta for refusing to appoint 41 individuals nominated by the Judicial Service Commission for judicial appointment.

==== Child-support case ====
On 30 June 2020, a 30-year-old woman caused a dramatic scene at the Milimani Law Courts in Nairobi, where she alleged that Chief Justice Maraga had neglected a child they had together in 2014 following an extra-marital affair. The woman also alleged that the Chief Justice had subsequently used his high office to frustrate her attempts to file a child support case in Kenyan Courts. Speaking through his lawyers, the Chief Justice denied any knowledge of the woman while dismissing her claims as the latest in a well choreographed state-sponsored plot to undermine his office and malign his name. Maraga's lawyers highlighted several gaps in the woman's claims, including inconsistencies in the Birth Certificate she produced to support the child's parentage. The Children's Court in Nairobi dismissed the case three weeks later when it emerged that the woman had not paid the mandatory court filing fees.

=== Retirement and legacy ===
Justice Maraga retired on 12 January 2021 when he turned 70 in accordance with Article 167(1) and 167(2) of the Constitution of Kenya which provides that an individual shall retire from the Office of the Chief Justice after serving for 10 years or on reaching the age of 70, whichever comes first. He handed the leadership of the judiciary to Lady Justice Philomena Mwilu, deputy chief justice and vice president of the Supreme Court, who would serve as the Acting Chief Justice and president of the Supreme Court until a substantive chief justice is appointed.

In his valedictory message during his retirement ceremony, Justice Maraga indicated that he was proud to be leaving behind "a strong Judiciary, a professional and enthusiastic corps of Judges and Judicial Officers as well as staff who [were] deeply committed to the administration of justice, and an increasingly enlightened public whose confidence in and demand for [the Judiciary's] services grows by the day."

On 8 June 2026, Maraga was briefly arrested while participating in a protest against construction works inside Nairobi National Park. He also participated in the protests for the freedom of Rose Njeri.

== Campaign ==
Maraga is a candidate for President of Kenya in 2027.

== Personal life ==
David Maraga is married to Yucabeth Nyaboke, with whom they have three children; Dr. Edith K. Maraga, Emma I. Maraga-Mangoa, and Moses K. Maraga. He is also a grandfather of two. Maraga is a member of the Seventh-day Adventist Church (SDA).

== See also ==
- Judiciary of Kenya
- Supreme Court of Kenya
- Philomena Mwilu
