= Ekuru Aukot =

Kenyan lawyer and politician

John Ekuru Longoggy Aukot
- Born: c. 1972; Turkana County, Kapedo.
- Education: University of Warwick, UK
- Occupations: Lawyer, politician
- Known for: PunguzaMizigo2019 Constitutional Amendment
- Political party: Thirdway Alliance

Dr. John Ekuru Longoggy Aukot (born c. 1972) is a Kenyan lawyer and politician. He was a third tier candidate in the 2017 Kenyan general election.

Dr. Aukot Sponsored a Bill to amend the Kenya Constitution popularly known as Punguza mzigo Bill through a popular initiative, managed to garner 1.2 Million signatures and approved By IEBC to proceed to county assemblies for debate.

The high court in Kenya, allowed the Punguza Mzigo Bill sponsored by Thirdway alliance to proceed in the 47 County Assemblies for debate.

In March 2024, Ekuru Aukot announced that he was launching a new legal challenge against the plan to send Kenyan police forces to Haiti, ravaged by gangs.
