= Joseph Momanyi =

Kenyan judoka

Personal information
- Nationality: Kenyan

Sport
- Sport: Judo

Joseph Momanyi is a Kenyan judoka. He competed in the men's half-lightweight event at the 1992 Summer Olympics. He later served as sports director for the national judo association.
