= Martha Koome =

15th and Current Chief Justice of the Republic of Kenya

Hon. Justice Martha Koome EGH
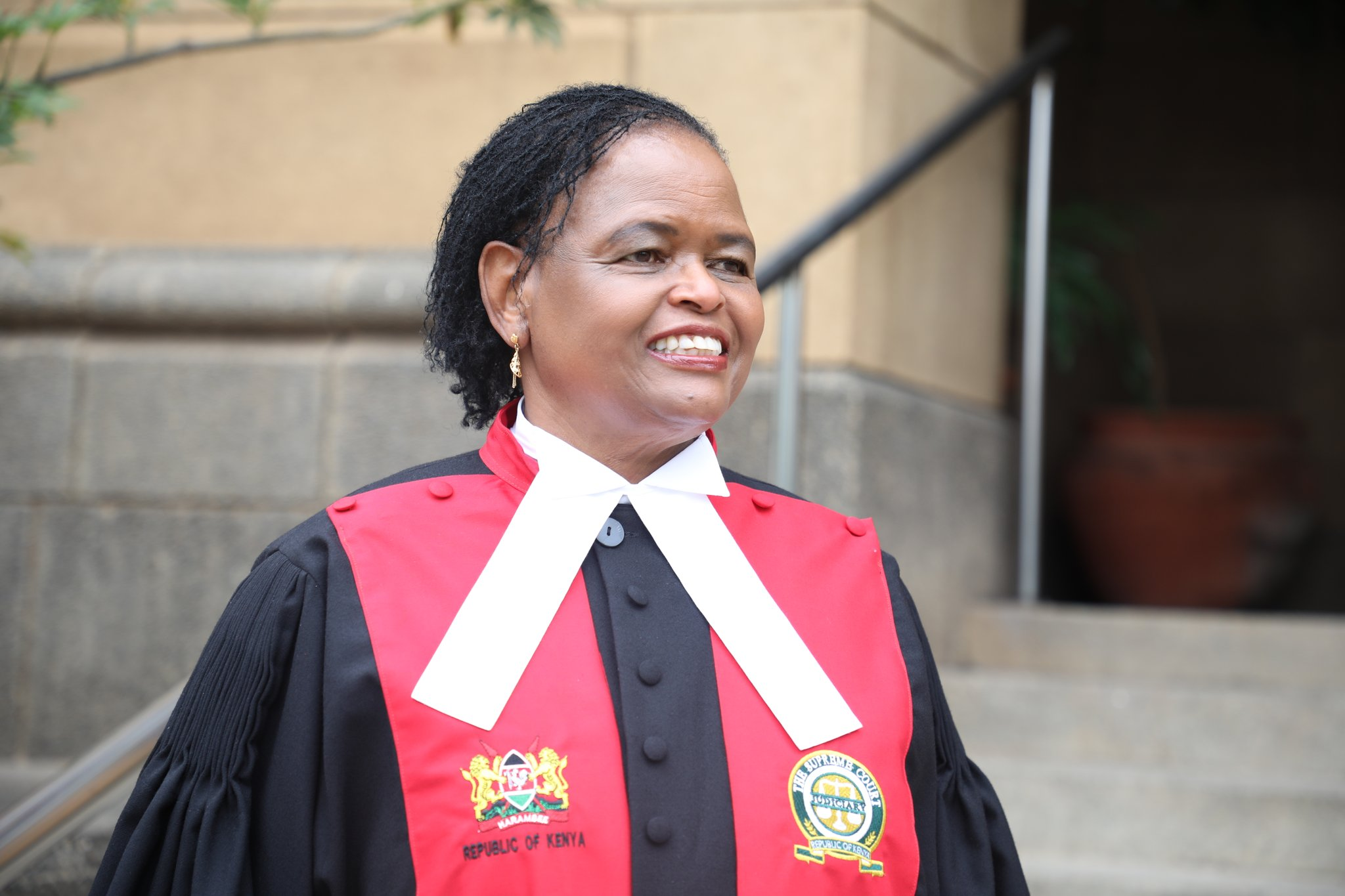
- Koome in 2022

Chief Justice of Kenya
- Incumbent
- Assumed office 21 May 2021
- Appointed by: Uhuru Kenyatta
- Deputy: Philomena Mwilu
- Preceded by: David Maraga

Judge at the Court of Appeal of Kenya
- In office January 2012 – 19 May 2021

Chairperson of Kenya Magistrates and Judges Association.
- In office January 2012 – January 2016

Personal details
- Born: Martha Karambu; 3 June 1960 (age 66) Meru District, Kenya Colony
- Spouse: Koome Kiragu
- Children: 3
- Education: University of Nairobi (LLB); University of London (LLM)
- Occupation: Chief Justice of Kenya

Martha Karambu Koome (born 3 June 1960) is a Kenyan advocate who is currently serving as the chief justice of Kenya and is the first woman to occupy the post.

== Early life and education ==
Koome was born on 3 June 1960 in Kithiu village, Meru District, Kenya. She attended Our Lady Consolata Mugoiri Girls High School in Murang'a County. She holds an LL.B. from the University of Nairobi, which she received in 1986. Koome enrolled at Kenya School of Law the following year. She completed her master's degree (LL.M) in public international law at the University of London in 2010.

== Career ==
Koome began her legal career as a legal associate at Mathenge and Muchemi Advocates, and later started a law firm, working as a managing partner until 2003. She was elected as a council member of the Law Society of Kenya (LSK) in 1993–1996.

During her tenure at the Law Society of Kenya, she took a leading role in constitutional and legal reforms and was part of the constitutional review process as a delegate at the Bomas of Kenya where she partially chaired the thematic area on the Bill of Rights. Koome also served as the inaugural treasurer of the East Africa Law Society between 1994 and 1996. She has also served as chairperson of FIDA, one of the leading human rights organizations in the country.

Koome has distinguished herself as a defender of human and gender rights. She was one of the lawyers who actively participated in the clamor for the repeal of section 2A of the Constitution of Kenya and for the independence of the judiciary. She is an acclaimed expert in family law and she takes a keen interest in the welfare of children. She was a runner-up in the 2020 United Nations person of the year. In 1995 she was appointed by the African Union meeting of heads of states as a commissioner to the African Committee on the Rights and welfare of children. She has also served as the chairperson of the National Council on the Administration of Justice special taskforce on children matters where she helped steer the review of the Children's Act.

Koome was appointed Judge of the Court of Appeal in January 2012. Prior to her appointment to the Court of Appeal, she served as a judge of the High Court of Kenya for over eight years.

In the same year she was appointed as Court of Appeal judge, she was also elected the chairperson of the Kenya Magistrates and Judges Association. In 2016 she was among 13 female candidates shortlisted by the Judicial Service Commission for the deputy chief justice position, which would later be occupied by Justice Philomena Mwilu.

Koome was among 13 candidates who applied for appointment to replace David Maraga when he retired in January 2021. She was shortlisted for the position, and attended her public interview on 14 April 2021. Koome is a renowned human rights and gender advocate. She participated in the campaign for the repeal of section 2A of the Kenyan constitution which converted Kenya into a multi-party state. This essential repeal introduced term limits on the presidency.

Koome is also a protector of women and children's rights. She was the African Union Commissioner to the African committee on the rights and welfare of children.

When the JSC invited memoranda on her suitability for nomination, the president of the Law Society of Kenya submitted a complaint accusing her of being an unfair arbiter, by ruling some specific court cases based on nepotism, favouritism and improper motive by ruling in favour of the executive arm of the Kenyan government for improper motive and sometimes based on ethnicity. Later, she instructed her lawyers to issue a demand to the LSK president to retract the law society's allegations against her within seven days, threatening to sue him over defamation arising from the complaints he submitted to the JSC. In May 2021, the president of the LSK, Nelson Havi, told off Koome and demanded she be transparent and accountable for her actions in the mentioned memoranda, by vowing not to apologize for the evidence-backed memoranda.

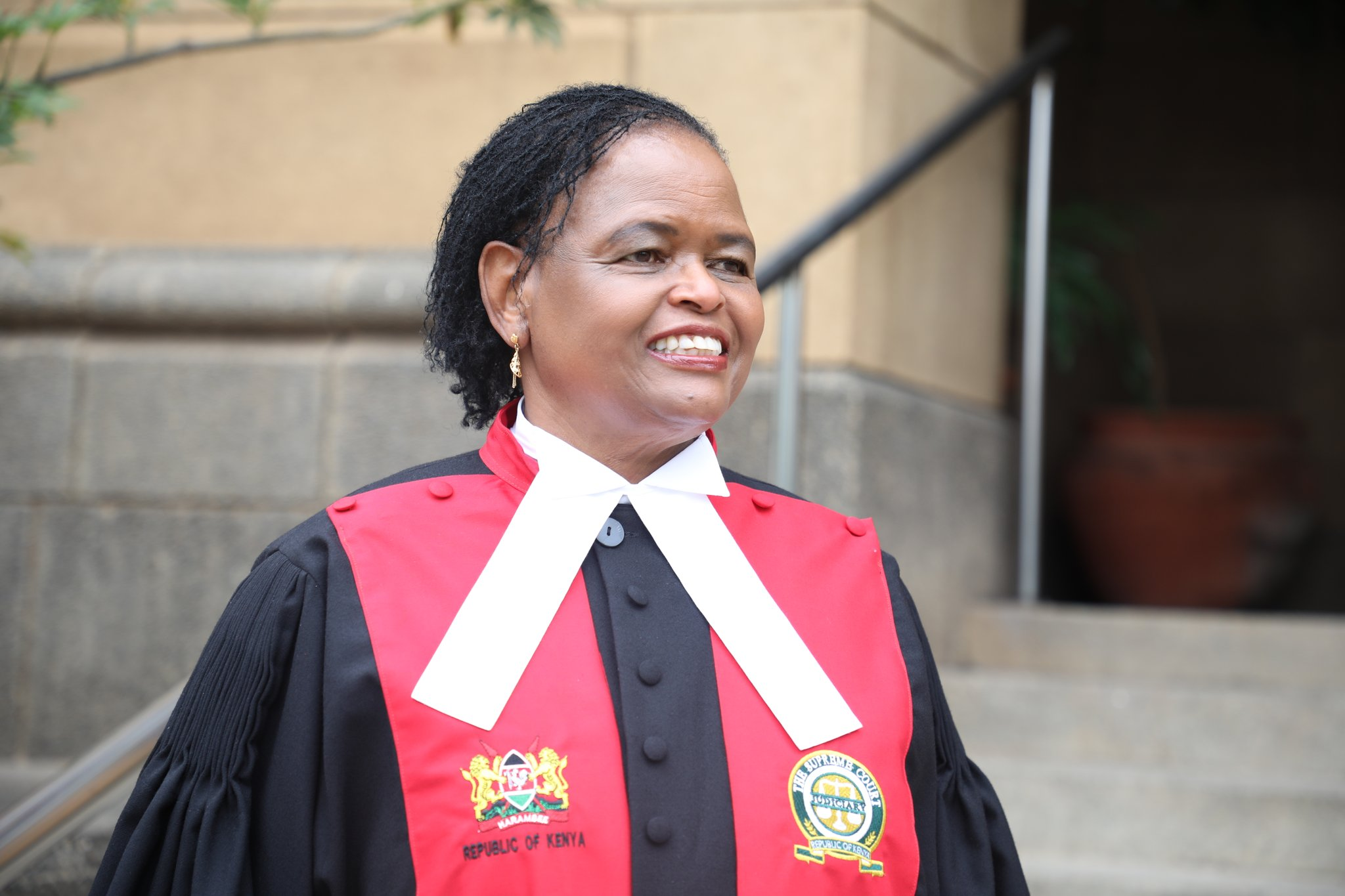
Martha Koome at the Supreme Court of Kenya

Koome's suitability was also challenged by Khelef Khalifa who questioned the manner in which she took part in a Court of Appeal sitting that reversed a judgment of the High Court that had declared that all returning officers who had been retained by the IEBC to manage the repeat presidential election on 26 October 2017 had been unlawfully appointed. Once arguments in the case were concluded, the High Court scheduled the judgment for delivery on 25 October 2017, the eve of the repeat presidential election. On the eve of this judgment, the government declared 25 October a public holiday, meaning courts would not be operational and judges would not be in a position to render any judgments. Chief Justice David Maraga issued special authority to the Judicial Review Division of the High Court in Nairobi to sit during the public holiday so that the judges could dispense with the scheduled judgment. No such authority was given for the Court of Appeal, whose registries remained closed. Once the High Court delivered the judgment holding that the returning officers were in office illegally, the IEBC somehow managed to file an appeal at the Court of Appeal which was closed due to the public holiday, and Koome appeared alongside two other judges of the Court of Appeal to handle the matter. All three judges were not serving in the Court of Appeal in Nairobi at the time, and the chief justice had not given authority for the court to sit on a public holiday. The three judges had ostensibly been called to sit by the then president of the Court of Appeal, Justice Paul Kihara Kariuki. The judges stayed the High Court Judgment, thereby giving the IEBC the green light to run the repeat presidential poll the following day.

When questioned about her role in this case during the interviews, she indicated that she had to comply with the directives of the president of the Court of Appeal who summoned her to sit, and that the sitting was important because it saved the country from a constitutional crisis, alluding to the apparent lack of a provision in Kenya's laws for the extension of the term of the president where a repeat presidential election is not held within 60 days as demanded by the Constitution.

At the conclusion of the interviews, the JSC announced her nomination for the position, setting her up to be the 1st female, 15th chief justice, and the third chief justice after the 2010 constitution.

Her name was subsequently transmitted to the president, who sent it to Parliament for vetting and approval before her formal appointment. The Justice & Legal Affairs Committee of the National Assembly conducted her vetting hearing on 13 May and recommended that the full house should approve her nomination. The report of the committee was tabled before the full house on 19 May for discussion. The full house voted to approve her nomination on 19 May 2021 paving the way for her appointment as the chief justice.

Within hours of Parliament's approval vote, President Uhuru Kenyatta appointed her on 19 May 2021, as the chief justice of the Republic of Kenya. She took her oath of office at State House, Nairobi, on 21 May 2021.

She assumed office on Monday, 24 May 2021, in an Assumption of Office ceremony at the Supreme Court Building during which Deputy Chief Justice Philomena Mwilu handed over the instruments of power to the new chief justice.

On Monday 5 February 2024, Hon. Martha Koome presided over the launch and commissioning of the Nairobi Land Justice Working Group which is tasked with Expediting Land Justice through a People Centered Approach.

== Personal life ==
Koome is married to Koome Kiragu and has three children.
