= Ezra Chiloba =

Kenyan business executive (born 1979)

Ezra Chiloba Simiyu
- Born: 1979 (age 46–47); Trans Nzoia County, Kenya
- Citizenship: Kenya
- Education: University of Nairobi; Bachelor of Law; University of Oxford; Master of Science; Central European University; Master of Public Policy
- Occupation: Chief Executive
- Known for: Governance
- Title: Director General, Communications Authority of Kenya

Ezra Chiloba Simiyu is the current Consul General at the Kenyan mission in Los Angeles, USA. Chiloba is also a former Kenyan C-Suite executive in the ranks of the Communications Authority of Kenya where he served as the Director General after taking over from Francis Wangusi on 4 October 2021. Chiloba served as Director general at CAK until October 2023 when he was suspended by the board of management and subsequently voluntarily resigned from the position

== Career ==
He previously served as a Programme Officer at Cemiride and Oxfam Novib, as a Human Rights Officer at KNHCR, and as a Project Manager at UNDP. He also held the position of Deputy team leader (Governance) at Drivers of Accountability Programme (DAP) in 2015.

From January 2015 he was named CEO of the IEBC. In April 2018 he was suspended from his post, a matter that moved to court, before he was ultimately let go.

After IEBC he became Principal Partner at Chil & Kemp Strategies before being appointed to serve as a board member of the Youth Enterprise Development Fund.

In September 2021 he was appointed the Director General at Communications Authority of Kenya.

== Education ==
He attended Mutua Primary School in Kwanza County before joining St. Joseph's Kitale High School and then Kwanza Boys High School. He holds a Bachelor of Laws degree from the University of Nairobi, a Master of Science in Major Programme Management (MMPM) from the University of Oxford, and a Master of Public Policy from Central European University, Hungary.

== Awards ==
He was named to the Top 40 under 40 men by the Business Daily in 2015.
