= Alliance for Real Change =

Political party in Kenya

- Leader: Mohammed Abduba Dida
- Founded: 2010
- Headquarters: Nairobi

Website
- www.allianceforrealchange.com

The Alliance for Real Change (ARC) is a Kenyan political party founded in 2010 but registered in 2012, by Mohammed Abduba Dida a candidate in the March 2013 Kenyan Presidential election.
