= Restore and Build Kenya =

Political party in Kenya

- Leader: James Ole Kiyiapi
- Chairman: Samson Chemai
- Secretary-General: Dr. Charles Jakait
- Founded: 2012
- Headquarters: Eldoret
- Slogan: Kenya Mpya (New Kenya)

Website
- www.restoreandbuildkenya.org

Restore and Build Kenya (RBK) is a Kenyan political party launched in April 2012 by former Permanent Secretary Professor James ole Kiyiapi as part of his campaign to become the fourth President of Kenya.
