= Independent Electoral and Boundaries Commission =

Electoral commission of Kenya

- IEBC
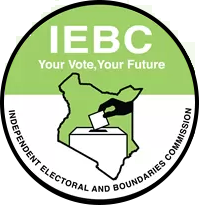
- IEBC Emblem
- Formation: 9 November 2011; 15 years ago
- Type: Electoral commission
- Headquarters: Anniversary Towers, Nairobi, Kenya
- Chairperson: Erastus Edung Ethekon
- Vice Chairperson: Fahima Araphat Abdallah
- Acting Chief Executive Officer and Commission Secretary: Moses Ledama Sunkuli
- Employees: 900 (2025)
- Website: www.iebc.or.ke
- The Commission consists of the Chairperson, Vice Chairperson and five Commissioners (seven members total) plus the separate Chief Executive Officer/Commission Secretary.

The Independent Electoral and Boundaries Commission (IEBC) is an independent regulatory agency that was founded in 2011 under the Constitution of Kenya. The Commission is responsible for conducting or supervising referendums and elections to any elective body or office established by the Constitution, and any other elections as prescribed by an Act of Parliament. It was created in a provision of the 2010 constitution and the Independent Electoral and Boundaries Commission Act. Its mandate includes "the continuous registration of voters and revision of the voter's roll, the delimitation of constituencies and wards, the regulation of political parties process, the settlement of electoral disputes, the registration of candidates for elections, voter education, the facilitation of the observation, monitoring and evaluation of elections, the regulation of money spent by a candidate or party in respect of any election, the development of a code of conduct for candidates and parties, [and] the monitoring of compliance with legislation on nomination of candidates by parties."

== Membership ==
The Commission is made up of seven commissioners and a CEO appointed by them (who also acts as the commission secretary). The commissioners are appointed by the President of Kenya and confirmed by the Kenyan Parliament. Each member serves a six-year term. By law, no Commissioner can be a member of a political party, and at least four votes are required for any official Commission action. Once appointed, the new commissioners are sworn in by the chief justice in office at the time of their appointment.

== Commissioners ==
  - Current Commissioners
    - Mr. Erastus Edung Ethekon, HSC – Chairperson
    - Ms. Fahima Araphat Abdallah, OGW – Vice Chairperson
    - Ms. Ann Njeri Nderitu, CBS – Commissioner
    - Dr. Alutalala Mukhwana – Commissioner
    - Mrs. Mary Karen Sorobit – Commissioner
    - Mr. Hassan Noor Hassan, EBS – Commissioner
    - Prof. Francis Odhiambo Aduol – Commissioner

=== Immediate former ===
- Marjan Hussein – IEBC Chief Executive Officer and Commissioner Secretary from 8 March 2022 to 3 February 2026, when he stepped down.
- Albert Casmus Bwire – June 2008 – confirmed 9 November 2011
- Kule Galma Godana – June 2008 – confirmed 9 November 2011
- Amb. Yusuf A. Nzibo – June 2008 – confirmed 9 November 2011
- Eng. Abdullahi Sharawe – June 2008 – confirmed 9 November 2011
- Thomas Letangule – June 2008 – confirmed 9 November 2011
- J. Muthoni Wangai – June 2008 – confirmed 9 November 2011
- Mohamed Alawi Hussun – June 2008 – confirmed 9 November 2011
- Prof. Abdi Yakub Guliye – sworn in on 19 January 2017
- Molu Boya – sworn in on 19 January 2017
- Ezra Chiloba – 2015 – Commission Secretary appointed Director-General of Communications Authority of Kenya
- Wafula Chebukati- 2017 []

== Offices ==
=== National office ===
The IEBC national office is located on the 6th Floor of Anniversary Towers, University Way in Nairobi.

=== Constituency offices ===
The Commission currently has offices in every constituency and county in the country.

== Key roles ==
For the Kenyan general election, 2013, IEBC has appointed individuals to the following positions:

=== Returning Officer ===
These are individuals appointed by the commission for the purpose of conducting an election or a referendum at the County Level. County Returning Officers are assisted by Deputy County Returning Officers.

=== Constituency Returning Officer ===
These are individuals appointed by the commission for the purpose of conducting an election or a referendum at the Constituency-Level. Constituency returning officers will be assisted by a Deputy Constituency Returning Officer.

== Elections carried out ==
The Commission has the constitutional mandate to conduct and supervise referendums and elections to any elective body or office established by the Constitution, and any other elections as prescribed by an Act of Parliament.

=== By-Elections ===
| Area | Position | Date |
|---|---|---|
| Makueni County | Member of Senate | 26 July 2013 |
| Kajiado West Constituency, Kajiado County | Member of County Assembly | 26 October 2017 |
| Bura Constituency, Tana River County | Member of County Assembly | 26 October 2017 |
| Bobasi Constituency, Kisii County | Member of County Assembly | 26 October 2017 |
| Turkana Central Constituency, Turkana County | Member of County Assembly | 26 October 2017 |
| Kitutu Chache South | Member of Parliament | 7 November 2017 |
| Masalani, Garissa county | Member of County Assembly | 7 November 2017 |
| Bogichora, Nyamira | Member of County Assembly | 7 November 2017 |

=== General Elections ===
| Date | Position | Presidential Winner |
|---|---|---|
| 4 March 2013 | President; Member of Senate; Member of Parliament; Woman Representative; County Governor; Member of County Assembly | Uhuru Muigai Kenyatta |
| 8 August 2017 | President; Member of Senate; Member of Parliament; Woman Representative; County Governor; Member of County Assembly | Presidential Results Nullified by Supreme Court |
| 26 October 2017 | President | Uhuru Muigai Kenyatta |
| 9 August 2022 | President; Member of Senate; Member of Parliament; Woman Representative; County Governor; Member of County Assembly | William Ruto |

The commission organised the general election on 4 March 2013. The presidential election was petitioned at the Supreme Court of Kenya.

The IEBC's handling of the Kenyan general election, 2017, has drawn scrutiny. The Supreme Court of Kenya invalidated the first Presidential election results due to voting irregularities. Former IEBC Commissioner Roselyn Akombe also issued a statement declaring that the second Presidential election would not be a fair election. Just before making this statement, she resigned and fled to the United States out of fear for her life.

== Potential misinformation on social media platforms. ==
A fake statement was circulating on Facebook claiming that the Independent Electoral and Boundaries Commission (IEBC) had issued a clarification on the distribution of 6,000 additional polling stations in Kenya before the 2022 general elections. This misinformation was not posted by IEBC and it was looked into by PesaCheck and Code for Africa.

== See also ==
- Constitution of Kenya
- Elections in Kenya
- Political parties in Kenya
- Kriegler Commission
