= Referendums in Kenya =

Referendums in Kenya are polls held in Kenya on particular issues.

== List ==
- 2005
- 2010
- 2021

== See also ==
- Referendum
