= 2013 Mandera local elections =

Local elections in Kenya

Local elections were held in Mandera County to elect a Governor and County Assembly on 4 March 2013. Under the new constitution, which was passed in a 2010 referendum, the 2013 general elections were the first in which Governors and members of the County Assemblies for the newly created counties were elected.

== Gubernatorial election ==
Candidate	Running Mate	Coalition	Party	Votes
Abdikadir, Adan Abdulla	Mohamed, Yussuf Abdi		The National Alliance	--
Ahmed, Abdi Noor	Yussuf, Maalim Hassan	Cord	Orange Democratic Movement	--
Ali, Ibrahim Roba	Abdifatah, Hasan Maalim		United Republican Party	--

== Prospective candidates ==
The following are some of the candidates who have made public their intentions to run:

- Ahmed Abdullahi
- Mohammed Abdi
- Abdirahaman Abass
- Mohammed Omar
- Abdikadir Adan Chitto
