= 2013 Tharaka-Nithi local elections =

Local elections in Kenya

Local elections were held in Tharaka-Nithi County to elect a Governor and County Assembly on 4 March 2013. Under the new constitution, which was passed in a 2010 referendum, the 2013 general elections were the first in which Governors and members of the County Assemblies for the newly created counties were elected. They will also be the first general elections run by the Independent Electoral and Boundaries Commission(IEBC) which has released the official list of candidates.

== Gubernatorial election ==
Candidate	Running Mate	Coalition	Party	Votes
M'nkiria, Petkay Shen Miriti	John, David Mbaya		Unity Party of Kenya	--
Mutegi, Francis Kijogi	Gitari, Boniface Juma	Cord	Wiper Democratic Movement – Kenya	--
Ragwa, Samuel Mbae	Muriithi, Eliud Mate	Jubilee	The National Alliance	--
