= 2013 Nakuru local elections =

Local elections in Kenya

Local elections were held in Nakuru County to elect a Governor and County Assembly on 4 March 2013. Under the new constitution, which was passed in a 2010 referendum, the 2013 general elections were the first in which Governors and members of the County Assemblies for the newly created counties were elected. They will also be the first general elections run by the Independent Electoral and Boundaries Commission(IEBC) which has released the official list of candidates.

== Gubernatorial election ==
Candidate	Running Mate	Coalition	Party	Votes
Bomett, Lawrence Kiprop	Omwenyo, Elizabeth Afwande	Cord	Orange Democratic Movement	--
Kiranga, Francis Peter	Mwendwa, Ossalla		United Democratic Forum Party	--
Mbugua, Kinuthia	Rutto, Joseph Kibore		The National Alliance	--
