= 2021 Kenyan constitutional referendum attempt =

2021 political related event

The Building Bridges Initiative (BBI) was a proposed set of amendments to the Constitution of Kenya initially proposed in October 2019. In the wake of the 2017 general election annulment and subsequent re-run, incumbent President Uhuru Kenyatta mandated the formation of the Presidential Taskforce on Building Bridges to Unity Advisory on 31 May 2018. The Taskforce was assigned to provide constitutional and legislative solutions in 9 broad categories:

1. Lack of National Ethos
2. Ethnic Antagonism and Competition
3. Responsibilities and Rights
4. Shared Prosperity
5. Divisive Elections
6. Safety and Security
7. Devolution
8. Corruption
9. Inclusivity

In October 2019, the Taskforce published their findings, which were incorporated into the Constitutional Amendment Bill, introduced in November 2020. The initiative consisted of 78 amendments, spanning 13 of the Constitution's 18 chapters. After the Bill passed, a Constitutional referendum was scheduled to occur in Kenya in June 2021, per the Kenyan Constitution.

The referendum, which was approved by 30 of the 47 county assemblies, was halted on 13 May 2021, by a five-judge panel of the High Court of Kenya. In its decision, the court stated that the process by which the referendum was formed was unconstitutional and barred the Independent Electoral and Boundaries Commission from proceeding with the referendum. In response to this, the Attorney General of Kenya and the Kenyan government filed an appeal of the court's decision, asking that the ruling be overturned.

On 20 August 2021, a seven-judge panel from Kenya's Court of Appeal upheld the High Court's ruling that the BBI process was unconstitutional.

In September 2021, Kenya's Attorney General's Office filed a notice of appeal announcing that it will challenge the Court of Appeal's ruling, taking the case to Kenya's Supreme Court.

On 31 March 2022, the Supreme Court of Kenya upheld the rulings of the lower courts, ruling that "The Constitution Amendment Bill of 2020 is unconstitutional," because President Kenyatta initiated the amendments through his creation of the Presidential Taskforce on Building Bridges to Unity Advisory, and vocal endorsement of the legislation crafted based on their findings.

== Background ==
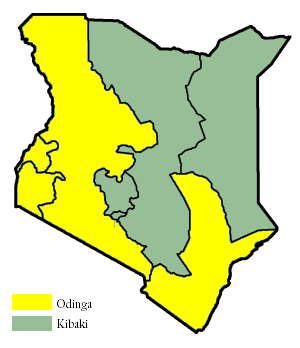
Kenya Presidential Election Results, 2007

Since Kenya held its first multi-party elections in 1992, subsequent elections have all been extremely competitive. Widespread ethnic tension and political violence characterized the aftermath of both the 2007 and 2013 general elections, the latter of which saw incumbent President Uhuru Kenyatta elected for the first time. In the face of such destabilizing, political, ethnically-motivated violence, a subsequent constitutional crisis produced a grand coalition government and a new Constitution in 2010, as well as a protracted process in the International Criminal Court which saw Uhuru Kenyatta and his future Deputy President William Ruto accused of crimes against humanity. Despite these charges, both Kenyatta and Ruto continued to serve as President and Deputy President respectively, and seek election together in 2017. While there was less overall political violence through the course of the 2017 general election campaign, an attack on the home of William Ruto, and the murder of Christopher Msando of the Independent Electoral and Boundaries Commission (who had helped design a new voting system for the election), garnered international attention.

=== 2017 aftermath, annulment, and re-run ===
Though international missions from the African Union, Carter Center, East African Community, and European Union all praised the election as free and fair, opposition leader and presidential candidate of the National Super Alliance (NASA), Raila Odinga, suggested that the Independent Electoral and Boundaries Commission (IEBC) had been hacked, and that vote totals had been tampered with. Odinga then went on to challenge the electoral results, appealing to the Supreme Court of Kenya. Representatives of both Odinga's National Super Alliance and President Kenyatta's Jubilee Party were allowed to audit the IEBC's official results. After three days of deliberation, the Supreme Court ruled in favor of annulling the election, and a new Presidential election was scheduled for 17 October. A week before the re-run, former Prime Minister Odinga announced he was withdrawing from the election, citing a lack of "legal and constitutional guarantees" against another allegedly fraudulent result. President Kenyatta was re-elected with 98.3% of the popular vote and was sworn in on 28 November 2017. At least 92 civilians died in instances of election-related violence throughout the campaign period.

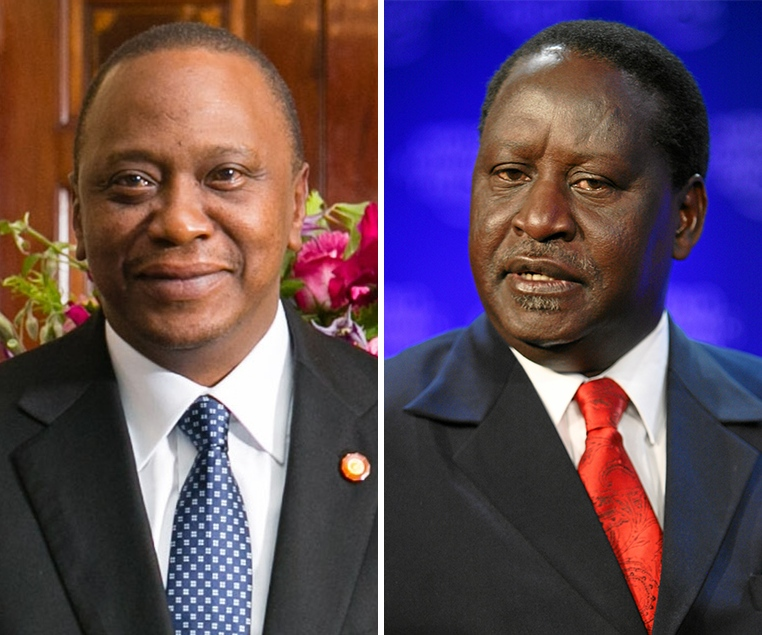
President Uhuru Kenyatta (left) and former Prime Minister Raila Odinga (right)

=== Reconciliation and "The Handshake" ===
Faced with a continuing political crisis in the wake of the 2017 election, negotiations began between President Kenyatta and former Prime Minister Odinga to end their longstanding rivalry. On 9 March 2018, the two men were photographed symbolically shaking hands. During the event, former Prime Minister Odinga declared, "The rift that has existed since independence now comes to an end with this act." President Kenyatta echoed his former rival: "We have come to a common understanding. An understanding that this country Kenya is greater than any one individual." This new alliance fundamentally reshaped and realigned Kenyan politics. Constituent parties in both the Jubilee and NASA coalitions who supported the alliance between Kenyatta and Odinga formed the Azimio la Umoja coalition, while those who did not, including the incumbent Deputy President William Ruto, formed their own pact: the Kenya Kwanza Coalition. Of the 416 members of the Parliament of Kenya in both houses, over 180 members have changed their party affiliation from 2017. While the exact terms of President Kenyatta and former Prime Minister Odinga's agreement have not been published, both men agreed on a program of Constitutional reform which would facilitate their power-sharing, which later became the Building Bridges Initiative.

== Amendment process ==
Following "the Handshake" on 9 March, the original Building Bridges Initiative task force was announced, and on 31 May 2018, President Kenyatta officially decreed the creation of the Presidential Taskforce on Building Bridges to Unity Advisory, and the appointment of its 14 Members and 2 Secretaries. Both President Kenyatta and former Prime Minister Odinga claimed that the chief goal of the BBI task force was to address the problems inherent in Kenya's "winner-take-all" electoral system. The Taskforce carried out a large-scale research mission, spending 18 months meeting with citizens in all of Kenya's 47 counties, totaling more than 7,000 citizens. Over 400 elected leaders at the National and County level were consulted, as well as 123 "individuals representing major institutions, including constitutional bodies and major stakeholders in the public and private sectors."

After the Presidential Taskforce's findings were released to the public, the final draft of the amendment proposals was presented to Parliament on 25 November 2020 as the Constitutional Amendment Bill of 2020.

=== Amending the Constitution ===
The 2010 Kenyan Constitution contains two provisions for amendment, one by "parliamentary initiative," and one by "popular initiative." To amend the Constitution by parliamentary initiative, an amendment bill must be introduced in either House of the Kenyan Parliament and must pass both chambers with 2/3rds supermajority support. Then, the Speakers of the two Houses of Parliament jointly submit the Bill for the President's signature. However, according to Article 255 of the Constitution, a national referendum to approve the changes must be called after the President signs the bill if its amendments relate to any of the following:

"

- The Supremacy of this Constitution;
- The territory of Kenya;
- The sovereignty of the people;
- The national values and principles of governance mentioned in Article 10 (2) (a) to (d);
- The Bill of Rights;
- The term of office of the President;
- The independence of the Judiciary and the commissions and independent offices...;
- The functions of Parliament;
- The objects, principles, and structure of devolved government;
- The provisions of [amending the Constitution].

"

Should this referendum pass with a simple majority of votes, and as long as "at least [20%] of [registered voters] in each of at least half of the counties vote in the referendum," then the Constitution is amended.

However, the legislation crafted out of the Building Bridges Initiative called for an "amendment by popular initiative," by which an amendment to the Constitution can be proposed by a popular petition with at least 1 million signatures of registered voters. The petition is then evaluated by the IEBC, which submits the bill containing the proposed amendments to each of the 47 county assemblies for approval within three months. If passed with simple majority support from over 50% of the county assemblies, the Bill then goes to parliament, where it requires only simple majority support to then be signed by the President. If the Bill fails to clear the 50% support threshold in either House of Parliament, the Bill is again voted on in a national referendum, requiring the same 20% of registered voter turnout in at least half the counties, and a simple majority of votes.

=== Kenyatta and the popular initiative ===
While the BBI Constitutional Amendment Bill was originally brought before parliament in 2020, President Uhuru Kenyatta ultimately decided to change tactics, and the BBI Secretariat, began a signature collection drive, which reached the requisite 1,000,000 registered voter threshold, as 1.33 million signatures were verified by the IEBC on 22 January 2021. By 23 February 2021, 30 of the 47 county assemblies had approved the BBI referendum, surpassing the minimum threshold of 24 counties to trigger a national referendum. By the time of the High Court ruling on the BBI in May 2021, 42 county assemblies had approved the BBI referendum. The Nandi and Elgeyo Marakwet assemblies voted no, while the Baringo county assembly decision had been vetoed by a local court, and two counties had not held votes. Members of the National Assembly then overwhelmingly passed the BBI Constitutional Amendment Bill, voting 224–63 in favor, with two abstentions.

== BBI contents ==
Members of the Presidential Taskforce on Building Bridges to Unity Advisory were tasked with addressing nine major categories through legislative and constitutional policy proposals:

1. Lack of National Ethos
2. Ethnic Antagonism and Competition
3. Responsibilities and Rights
4. Shared Prosperity
5. Divisive Elections
6. Safety and Security
7. Devolution
8. Corruption
9. Inclusivity

To address these nine major challenges, a sweeping 78 constitutional amendments were proposed in the Constitutional Amendment Bill of 2020, affecting 13 of the Kenyan Constitution's 18 chapters. The proposed amendments include changes in these key areas:

=== National commitments ===
New general language was inserted into the Constitution in the opening chapters on "The Republic," and "Citizenship," particularly relating to national values. A new article committed to advancing "African Unity and political confederation of the eastern Africa region," as well as the Sustainable Development goals set out by the U.N. Additional new articles in these chapters included firmer state commitments to protecting intellectual property and data privacy, as well as advancing economic digitization. New responsibilities for citizens include "national unity," "well-being of the family," "[combatting] corruption," self-improvement, paying taxes, respecting private property, and African unity. The BBI also included several constitutional commitments to Parliament prioritizing the passage of anti-corruption bills introduced as a part of the BBIs legislative framework.

=== Women's representation ===
A key piece of the BBI's proposed reforms was the overhaul of Constitutionally-protected women's representation in elected offices. In the chapter on "Representation of the People," new language would require the Kenyan Independent Electoral and Boundaries Commission to enforce a 1-to-2 gender ratio for all parties' candidate lists and would allow Parliament to pass laws penalizing political parties for violations of that ratio. While ideally the 1-to-2 ratio in candidate lists would result in a 1-to-2 gender ratio in actually elected representatives, the Constitution provides for "special top-up seats," which will be allocated to female candidates to achieve mandated gender parity, though this provision sunsets after 15 years. A similar requirement is mandated for all county assemblies, though the gender-equalizing top up seat provision sunsets in this case after 10 years. In a newly reformed Senate fashioned after the American two-senators-per-state model, new language in Article 98 mandates gender parity. Each county is required to send one woman and one man. Three additional members of the Senate will be added, one of whom will represent all county governors, and two will be nominated by a "statutory body responsible for the professional regulation of accountants," for a total of 97 representatives. County gubernatorial/deputy gubernatorial tickets would also now require gender parity.

=== Executive and parliamentary expansion ===
The most controversial and impactful reform proposed in the BBI package is the unilateral increase in size made to the National Assembly. 70 new districts would be added, for a total of 360 members, though the first-past-the-post electoral system would be preserved, along with existing constituencies. Special seats will also be allocated specifically for people with disabilities and youth, to increase marginalized voices' presence in the National Assembly. To check and balance a larger and more influential Parliament, an expanded executive branch is also mandated. The BBI reestablishes the position of Prime Minister, which was initially introduced after the 2007 constitutional crisis, but abolished in 2013. This position would be appointed and dismissed by the President, but would also be subject to majority votes of confidence in the National Assembly. The Prime Minister must be nominated from the sitting National Assembly and would receive a seat on the National Security Council upon being confirmed. If a President fails twice to nominate a Prime Minister who holds the confidence of the National Assembly, their third nomination is not subject to a National Assembly vote. New language also empowers the President to appoint a Cabinet of Ministers and Deputy Ministers who are not required to already be Members of the National Assembly and would be granted special seats if not already elected. From this Cabinet, two Deputy Prime Ministers would be nominated by the President, subject to a vote in Parliament. Unique to the Cabinet's Finance Minister would be the sole power to halt government funding for a national or county-level "state organ" deemed fiscally irresponsible, though this would be subject to a vote by the National Assembly or Senate for national or county matters respectively.

As a consolation prize, the runner-up in the Presidential election will be granted the title of Leader of the Official Opposition and a special seat as a member of the National Assembly, as long as their party won at least a quarter of the seats in the most recent election. The Prime Minister and Leader of the Official Opposition cannot be from the same party.

=== Judicial and policing policy ===
In line with President Kenyatta's promise to "revisit" and "fix" the judiciary after the Supreme Court nullified his initial electoral victory in 2017, the BBI makes sweeping changes to both police and judicial institutions. New language establishes minimum qualifications for judges on the Supreme Court (20 years on the bench), the Court of Appeal (15 years), and the High Court (10 years), severely limiting pathways for non-career justices to be confirmed to higher courts. A new office, the Judiciary Ombudsman, is also established by the BBI, whose primary obligation would be the oversight of a new judicial impeachment process based on "public complaint," though they would also hold a non-voting position on the existing Judicial Service Commission. New language would empower the Judicial Service Commission to "discipline judicial officers including judges." Elected members of the commission would also be barred from practicing or serving in courts and tribunals to guard against conflicts of interest. A similar change would be made to the national policing structure, as a new governing Inspector General of Police would be head of an expanded National Police Service, replacing the civilian-led National Police Service Commission. The Inspector General of Police would be solely responsible for overseeing promotions and transfers within the National Police Service, while a new deputy Inspector General would oversee the Directorate of Criminal Investigations.

== Criticisms of the BBI ==
While an overwhelming majority of county assemblies voted to advance the BBI bill to the referendum stage, the proposed referendums drove a deeper wedge in an already deeply polarized political climate:

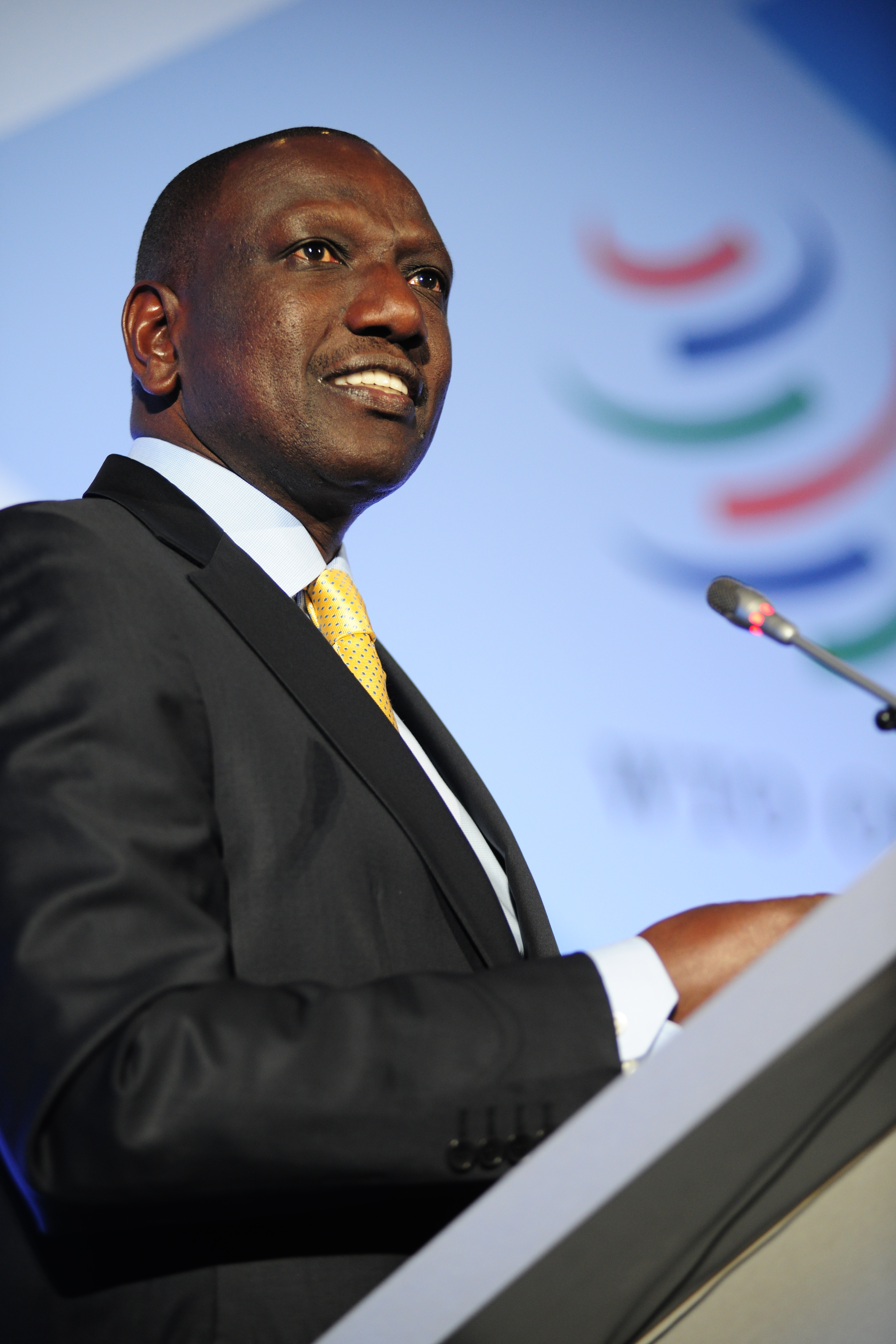
Deputy President William Ruto

=== Ruto's criticisms ===
Incumbent Deputy President and main opposition candidate in the upcoming 2022 Kenyan Presidential election, William Ruto, was sharply critical of the bill. He identified five key pieces of the proposal — particularly those that would expand the power and size of Kenya's executive branch— as concerning. He asserted that the President appointing a political ally to a Constitutionally-empowered Prime Ministerial position would not "[sort out] the winner-takes-all question," pointing out that in Kenya's current Parliament, every powerful office under the BBI system would be held by the incumbent Jubilee Party. He also took issue with the BBI's specific mentions of powers for either the "majority" or "minority" party as Kenya currently has a multi-party parliamentary system of democracy. He also claimed that the BBI's proposed changes to the National Police Service Commission and Judiciary Ombudsman positions would strip these offices of any pretense of independence from Kenya's executive. Finally, Ruto refuted the idea that the BBI promoted gender equality by instituting candidate and legislator quotas, especially in a disempowered Senate: "...we are making the participation of women nominal. The participation of women should be substantive." Similar shortcomings in regards to women's rights and representation were identified by the Sustainable Development Goals Forum Kenya in their November 2020 report on the BBI.

=== Political and legal criticisms ===
Among journalists and academics who lived through the violence following the 2007 Kenyan election, the BBI's solutions for reducing ethnic tension were not convincing. Rasna Warah, an editor for the United Nations Human Settlements Program wrote, "The BBI report recognises that ethnic divisions have polarised the country, but it does not acknowledge that ethnic polarisation is the result of a political leadership that forms opportunistic tribal alliances for its own advantage and is happy to pit one ethnic community against another in order to win elections." The BBI's provisions on education and ethnic leadership are based on a unifying framework that pushes groups into political and economic cooperation, however it is argued that this can lead to ineffective leadership and enforcement of political and societal rules. Warah claimed that police officers and teachers serving in the areas they grew up and were educated in often increases community buy-in, as opposed to the nationalization of policing and educational vocational training proposed in the BBI's reforms. The 2010 Constitution already includes articles that put the police under civilian control, yet violence ordered by the state is still prevalent in Kenyan policing.

Others raised objections similar to Ruto's, that with an expanded executive and a new order of precedence in Kenya's parliamentary procedures, the government would "[start] to look rather like a one-party state." And given that the elections in 2017, 2013, and 2007 all saw fierce competition between coalitions of roughly equal size, at least half of Kenya's voters and political establishment would be shut out of power for years. Professor Jill Cottrell Ghai at the Katiba Institute for Kenyan constitutional law claimed that given its adherence to a first-past-the-post electoral system, and pledge to preserve existing constituencies in a nod to incumbent politicians, the BBI reforms would not bring "a true parliamentary system," or "any sort of solution to Kenya's problems."

Dr. Patrick Mbugua, an expert on Peace & Conflict Studies applied a peace studies framework to the BBI and found that, given its unclear institutional origins as well as its contents, the legislation would not solve political violence in Kenya. Mbugua asserted that because the BBI "started as an exclusive and opaque process driven by two men," and was heavily influenced by their existing political alliances, "the process was heavily skewed towards the interests of [President Kenyatta and former Prime Minister Odinga]." Asserting that Kenya's electoral violence was never truly about ethnic tension, but was instead politically motivated and encouraged by the state, the BBI's proposals to fix "ethnic antagonism and competition" and "divisive elections" through a patriotic school curriculum and criminalization of hate speech and electoral violence would do little to solve Kenya's continuing political violence. The BBI's reforms assume that the offices in its newly expanded executive branch would all be filled by members of different ethnic groups, dependent on the President as the "appointing authority." Mbugua disagrees, arguing that "good faith cannot be legislated," and citing the breakdown of Kenya's 2017 alliance system in favor of today's realignment as proof. He agrees with Professor Ghai's criticisms about too much concentrated executive power: "[The BBI] echoes the late Mobutu Sese Seko's strategy in Zaire of co-opting would-be opponents, letting them feed at the state trough, rotating them in and out of office, and encouraging them to become wealthy through corruption to neutralise them....as the collapse of Mobutu's Zaire shows, such a strategy does not foster durable peace."

Before the rulings on BBI, objections to the constitutionality of its process were also raised. Dr. Westen K. Shilaho at the University of Johannesburg wrote in a Quartz Africa article that the BBI "is a product of an informal process – there is no provision for it under [Kenya's] Constitution." The passage of BBI would mean that presidents would have the right to call for and organize popular initiatives which could pass through a majority vote in a referendum, circumventing Parliament. Former Minister of Justice and 2013 presidential candidate Martha Karua created the #LindaKatiba (Protect the Constitution) movement in response to the BBI's perceived end run around the 2010 Constitution, arguing that the BBI represented a return to autocratic rule. She argued that because a presidentially-proposed popular initiative was not in the Constitution, "the BBI project has illegally spent and continues to spend taxpayer's money. No disclosures are made on what the money has so far been spent and how much more is expected." Despite these criticisms, Karua has since joined Raila Odinga's Azimio la Umoja ticket as his nominee for Deputy President.

== Court challenges ==
=== High Court ruling ===
Although the BBI Constitutional Amendment Bill had gathered over 1 million valid signatures and the approval of a majority of the county assemblies, a five-judge panel from Kenya's High Court of Justice ruled on 13 May 2021 that President Kenyatta had violated the Constitution of Kenya through his heavy-handed involvement with the entire amendment process, making a critical Constitutional error by choosing to advocate for a popular initiative. Under the Constitution of Kenya, Constitutional reform is a right shared by the citizens and the Parliament, with the President being nominally confined to the signing of the already-passed amendment bill. The High Court ordered the Independent Electoral and Boundaries Commission to halt its preparations for a national referendum on the BBI Constitutional Amendment Bill. On 16 May 2021, the Attorney General ask the High Court to suspend their decision while the government filed with the Court of Appeal to hear the case again.

=== Court of Appeal ruling ===
On 21 August 2021, the Court of Appeal upheld the illegality of the BBI Constitutional Amendment Bill's unconstitutional process after 10 hours of deliberation. Like the High Court, the seven-judge panel agreed that constitutional amendments could only be initiated through Parliamentary proceedings or popular initiative, regardless of whether or not the million signature threshold was cleared. Because the amendments originated with the Presidential Taskforce, and not an initial signature drive or Parliamentary process, the reforms were again deemed unconstitutional. In addition, the Court of Appeal reasoned that President Kenyatta could be targeted by a civil suit for his role in violating the Constitution. The Attorney General again announced in September that the government would appeal the Court of Appeal's decision, taking the case to the Supreme Court of Kenya.

=== Supreme Court ruling ===
On 31 March 2022, The Supreme Court upheld the two lower courts' rulings that the BBI amendment process was unconstitutional. The seven Justices decided on seven key points of the BBI's unconstitutionality:

1. No, the basic structure doctrine does not apply in Kenyan jurisprudence (6–1)
2. Yes, the President initiated the amendment process (5–2)
  1. Yes, the President cannot utilize the popular initiative mechanism for constitutional change (6–1)
3. Yes, the BBI's provisions for the expansion of the National Assembly and drawing of new district borders are unconstitutional due to a lack of public participation (unanimous)
4. Yes, the President has immunity from civil proceedings in any court as a result of his actions surrounding BBI (unanimous)
5. No, the IEBC had no obligation to enforce that the BBI Taskforce complied with Constitutional requirements on public participation (unanimous)
  1. Yes, there was public participation in the BBI process (4–3)
6. Yes, the IEBC was right to verify the signatures gathered in the BBI popular initiative drive despite the process being unconstitutional (6–1)
7. No, this case does not warrant a broad ruling on the constitutional scope of referendum questions (unanimous)

Aside from the ruling on increasing the size of the National Assembly, the Supreme Court declined to rule on whether the content of the BBI Constitutional Amendment Bill, which leaves open the possibility that should a proper process be conducted through either another signature drive, or a properly conducted Parliamentary vote and subsequent referendum, the institutional changes promised in the BBI Bill could still be approved by Kenyans without President Kenyatta's expressed involvement.

== Impact ==
International and domestic journalists agree that these repeated legal defeats are a blow to President Kenyatta's outgoing administration, and the election chances of his endorsed candidate, former rival Raila Odinga, in 2022. Journalists and political professionals in Kenya agree that "President Kenyatta and Odinga must go back to the drawing board to find a formula for satisfying competing interests." A referendum on the BBI reforms would've been an electoral test run for the national appeal of Kenyatta and Odinga's new alliance before the 2022 elections. However, despite the failure of their signature reform package, Kenyatta and Odinga's alliance continues. President Kenyatta's refusal to endorse his own sitting Deputy President, William Ruto of the United Democratic Alliance has set up the 2022 Presidential election as a match between Kenyatta and Odinga's new alliance, and Ruto's more youthful constituency. The 2022 elections have been characterized as a referendum on Hustlers — Ruto's promised economic reform — vs. Dynasties — the alliance between two of Kenya's most prominent political families.

Kenyatta and Odinga's Azimio la Umoja coalition remains committed to the BBI as a centerpiece of their platform. After the High Court ruling in May, former Prime Minister Odinga voiced his continued belief in the reform package. As Kenya's politics are still split along ethnic lines, with the victors controlling the "spoils of power," the Azimio coalition supporting Odinga is filled with political veterans with large ethnic bases of support. Kenyatta's support brings a sizeable constituency of Kikuyu voters, one of Kenya's dominant ethnic groups. The addition of Kalonzo Musyoka's Wiper Party brings the Kamba group on board. The coalition contains over 20 parties, including the Kenya African National Union, led by Gideon Moi. KANU previously held power in Kenya from 1961 until 2002, first under Uhuru Kenyatta's father, President Jomo Kenyatta, and then under President Daniel arap Moi, father of Gideon.

Odinga's challenger, Deputy President William Ruto, is publicly skeptical of the BBI, arguing for prioritizing "bottom up" economic change before massive constitutional alteration. After the Supreme Court ruling, Ruto publicly called on President Kenyatta and Former Prime Minister Odinga to apologize to the people for "wasting four good years of our time" with the BBI reforms. Ruto's Kenya Kwanza coalition is made up of nine parties, including the Democratic Party, headed by the current Speaker of the National Assembly, Justin Muturi, who was previously a close ally of President Kenyatta. Ruto has been sharply critical of the alliance between Odinga and Kenyatta as an alliance of elites on both sides: "Today in Kenya you have a mongrel of a governance system, [...] you don't know whether the government is in opposition or the opposition is the one that is in government." Ruto has committed to "[accepting] the outcome of the election whichever way it goes."

== See also ==
- Constitution of Kenya
- Constitutional Reforms in Kenya
- Kenyan constitutional referendum, 2005
- Kenyan constitutional referendum, 2010
