= 2013 Nyandarua local elections =

Local elections in Kenya

Local elections were held in Nyandarua to elect a Governor and County Assembly on 4 March 2013. Under the new constitution, which was passed in a 2010 referendum, the 2013 general elections were the first in which Governors and members of the County Assemblies for the newly created counties were elected. They will also be the first general elections run by the Independent Electoral and Boundaries Commission(IEBC) which has released the official list of candidates.

== Gubernatorial election ==
Candidate	Running Mate	Coalition	Party	Votes
Gathimba, Peter Mwangi	Muchiri, Geoffrey Gachara		National Rainbow Coalition	--
Mwangi, Daniel Withaka	Kirika, Waithaka Mwangi	Jubilee	The National Alliance	--
Ngugi, David Mwaniki	Murage, Susan Wagaki		Grand National Union	--
