= 2013 Kericho local elections =

Local elections in Kenya

Local elections were held in Kericho County to elect a Governor and County Assembly on 4 March 2013. Under the new constitution, which was passed in a 2010 referendum, the 2013 general elections

== Gubernatorial election ==
Candidate	Running mate	Coalition	Party	Votes
Chepkwony, Paul Kiprono	Kikwai, Susan Chepkoech		United Republican Party	--
Keter, Jonah Kipkemoi	Kirui, Kenneth Kipkoech		United Democratic Forum Party	--
Kirui, Charles Davy Kipngetich Arap	Samuel Rotich Kimutai		Kenya African National Union	--
Sigei, Joel Kipkosge	Samumkut, Beatrice Chepkemoi		Orange Democratic Movement	--

== Prospective candidates ==
The following are some of the candidates who have made public their intentions to run:

- Charles Kirui - former Belgut MP
- Prof. Paul Chepkwony - a former Moi University lecturer
- Sammy Chepkwony
- Jonah Keter - a former deputy chairman of Tea Board of Kenya
- Joel Sigei - a career provincial administrator.
