= 2013 Trans-Nzoia local elections =

Local elections in Kenya

Local elections were held in Trans-Nzoia County to elect a Governor and County Assembly on 4 March 2013. Under the new constitution, which was passed in a 2010 referendum, the 2013 general elections were the first in which Governors and members of the County Assemblies for the newly created counties were elected.

== Gubernatorial election ==
Candidate	Running Mate	Coalition	Party	Votes
Bisau, Maurice Kakai	Mbito, Michael Maling'a		New Ford Kenya	--
Gesuk, Joel Onsare	Kihiko, Jane Wamboi	Jubilee	The National Alliance	--
Khaemba, Patrick E.S. Simiyu	Tarus, Stanely Kiptoo Kenei		FORD-KENYA	--
Wasike, Godfrey Siundu	Khalayi, Cyncia		Wiper Democratic Movement – Kenya	--
Wekesa, Noah Mahalang'ang'a	Muliro, Mukasa Mwambu		Orange Democratic Movement	--
