= 2013 Taita-Taveta local elections =

Local elections in Kenya

Local elections were held in Taita-Taveta to elect a Governor and County Assembly on 4 March 2013. Under the new constitution, which was passed in a 2010 referendum, the 2013 general elections were the first in which Governors and members of the County Assemblies for the newly created counties were elected.

== Gubernatorial election ==
Candidate	Running Mate	Coalition	Party	Votes
Kibai Sophy Wali	Mghalu, Kevin Mwandoe		FORD-KENYA	--
Mruttu, John Mtuta	Kibuka, Mary Ndiga	Cord	Orange Democratic Movement	--
Mwamburi, Wisdom Kazungu	Mgendi, Faustine Mwanyolo		United Republican Party	--
Mwandoe, Elijah Mwamidi	Mwakuriga, Jacob Mwakugu		SDP	--
Mwatela, Jacinta Wanjala	Masawi, Dr. Vincent Mwandima		Wiper Democratic Movement – Kenya	--
Ngali, Mwanyengela	Shambi, Manuel Mwawaza		NARC–Kenya	--
