= 2013 Homa Bay local elections =

Local elections in Kenya

Local elections were held in Homa Bay County to elect a Governor and County Assembly on 4 March 2013. Under the new constitution, which was passed in a 2010 referendum, the 2013 general elections were the first in which Governors and members of the County Assemblies for the newly created counties were elected. They will also be the first general elections run by the Independent Electoral and Boundaries Commission(IEBC) which has released the official list of candidates.

== Gubernatorial election ==
Candidate	Running Mate	Coalition	Party	Votes
Auko, Philip Ochieng'	Ajengo, Dickson Oyoo		Independent	--
Awiti, Cyprian A. Otieno	Orata, Hamilton Onyango	Cord	Orange Democratic Movement	--
Odhiambo, Benson Owiti	Otieno, Tommy Okoth	Jubilee	The National Alliance	--

== Prospective candidates ==
The following are some of the candidates who have made public their intentions to run:

- Ben Odero
- Tom Ogada
- Philip Auko - an independent candidate,
- Philip Okundi
- Cyprian Awiti
- George Ogada
