= 2013 West Pokot local elections =

Local elections in Kenya

Local elections were held in West Pokot to elect a Governor and County Assembly on 4 March 2013. Under the new constitution, which was passed in a 2010 referendum, the 2013 general elections were the first in which Governors and members of the County Assemblies for the newly created counties were elected.

== Gubernatorial election ==
Candidate	Running Mate	Coalition	Party	Votes
Kitalei, Simon Kachapin	Lotee, Titus		Kenya African National Union	--
Lipale, Geofrey	Kalinyong'ar, Monicah Kakuko	Cord	Orange Democratic Movement	--
Powon, Micha Pkopus	Seretion, Michael Kimpur		United Republican Party	--
Ripko, Hezron Krop	Chenanga, Lucia		The National Alliance	--
