= 2013 Uasin Gishu local elections =

Local elections in Kenya

Local elections were held in Uasin Gishu to elect a Governor and County Assembly on 4 March 2013. Under the new constitution, which was passed in a 2010 referendum, the 2013 general elections were the first in which Governors and members of the County Assemblies for the newly created counties were elected.

== Gubernatorial election ==
Candidate	Running Mate	Coalition	Party	Votes
Kamar, Margaret Jepkoech	Chelogoi, Stephen Kimutai	Cord	Orange Democratic Movement	--
Mandago, Jackson Kiplagat	Kiprotich, Daniel Kiplagat		United Republican Party	--
