= 2013 Nyeri local elections =

Local elections in Kenya

Local elections were held in Nyeri County to elect a Governor and County Assembly on 4 March 2013. Under the new constitution, which was passed in a 2010 referendum, the 2013 general elections were the first in which Governors and members of the County Assemblies for the newly created counties were elected. They will also be the first general elections run by the Independent Electoral and Boundaries Commission(IEBC) which has released the official list of candidates.

== Gubernatorial election ==
| Candidate | Running Mate | Coalition | Party | Votes |
|---|---|---|---|---|
| Gachagua, James Nderitu | Githaiga, Wamathai Samwel | | Grand National Union | -- |
| Gakuru, Patrick Wahome | Munene, Maina Patrick | Jubilee | The National Alliance | -- |
| Mathenge, Thuo | Ndegwa, Geoffrey Gitonga | | Saba Saba Asili | -- |
| Mwangi Njururi Mutahi | Macharia, David Wanjohi | | NARC–Kenya | -- |
| Wang'ondu, John Githinji | Gichuki, Eliud Kanyi | | Orange Democratic Movement | -- |
