= 2013 Turkana local elections =

Local elections in Kenya

Local elections were held in Turkana County to elect a Governor and County Assembly on 4 March 2013. Under the new constitution, which was passed in a 2010 referendum, the 2013 general elections were the first in which Governors and members of the County Assemblies for the newly created counties were elected. They will also be the first general elections run by the Independent Electoral and Boundaries Commission(IEBC) which has released the official list of candidates.

== Gubernatorial election ==
Candidate	Running Mate	Coalition	Party	Votes
Ekalimana, Malachy Charles	Erukudi, Chris Ekutani		New Ford Kenya	--
Logurale, Matthew Esinyen	Lonyipo, Alexander Alea		NARC–Kenya	--
Lomulen, Peter Lokol	Namaa, Cosmas Ekidor	Cord	Wiper Democratic Movement – Kenya	--
Peter Emuria Lotethiro	Lothike, John Bosco Eris		United Republican Party	--
Nanok, Josphat Koli	Lokoel, Peter Ekai		Orange Democratic Movement	--
