= Jacqueline Mutere =

Kenyan women's rights activist

- Citizenship: Kenya
- Occupation: Women's rights activist
- Organization: Grace Agenda
- Website: Grace Agenda Facebook; Grace Agenda Twitter

Jacqueline Mutere is a Kenyan women's rights activist who is the co-founder of Grace Agenda, a foundation which provides assistance and counseling to rape victims in Kenya. Mutere is also a member of the National Victims and Survivors Network, an organization which seeks to pursue the reparations agenda of the Truth, Justice and Reconciliation Commission (TJRC).

== Activism ==
In Kenya's 2007-2008 post-election violence following the disputed election, 1,000 people were killed and at least 900 women and girls experienced sexual violence. Mutere similarly was raped and impregnated by a neighbour. She sought an abortion, but because it was prohibited by law in Kenya, completed her pregnancy and gave birth to a daughter, Princess. Her own experience and resilience motivated her to support other survivors and their children by founding Grace Agenda.

Mutere founded Grace Agenda in 2010 to support the children of rape victims from that wave of ethnic violence. Shortly after creating the foundation, Mutere realized that many mothers of these children also needed a safe place to discuss their trauma, and that by providing that outlet, fewer mothers would pass on their trauma to their children. Due to the chaos that existed during the period of violence, the difficulty of identifying the attackers, many of them policemen, and the fact that many victims have not been able to come out publicly, this organization was dedicated to speak for the survivors. Her organization aids victims by sending survivors as monitors to accompany them in those visits to health facilities after being victimized. Mutere says, "The group is really key in moving the processes that support survivors; the representatives report to each other, including the government, so they know what to anticipate."

=== Covid-19 Pandemic Activism ===
During the COVID-19 pandemic, Mutere's work as a women's rights defender was made more difficult by fears that women visiting health facilities due to sexual or domestic violence would be tested and forcibly quarantined, and by economic hardships borne by the community. Mutere continues to advocate for and help victims in new cases, such as in seeking justice by testifying in court hearings, visiting the hospital, and attending counseling, among other aspects of post-assault treatment of sexual assault victims.

Mutere also focuses on pressuring the Kenyan government to follow through on its promise to distribute more than US$100 million worth of reparations to survivors of rape during the 2007-2008 unrest. These efforts included a peaceful march to deliver a petition to the Kenyan senate to remind its members of the pledges they made to rape survivors. The group also advocates for survivors' dignity and police vetting.

Mutere has also advised other women's welfare organizations in seeking funds and applying for grants.
