= David Ndii =

Kenyan economist

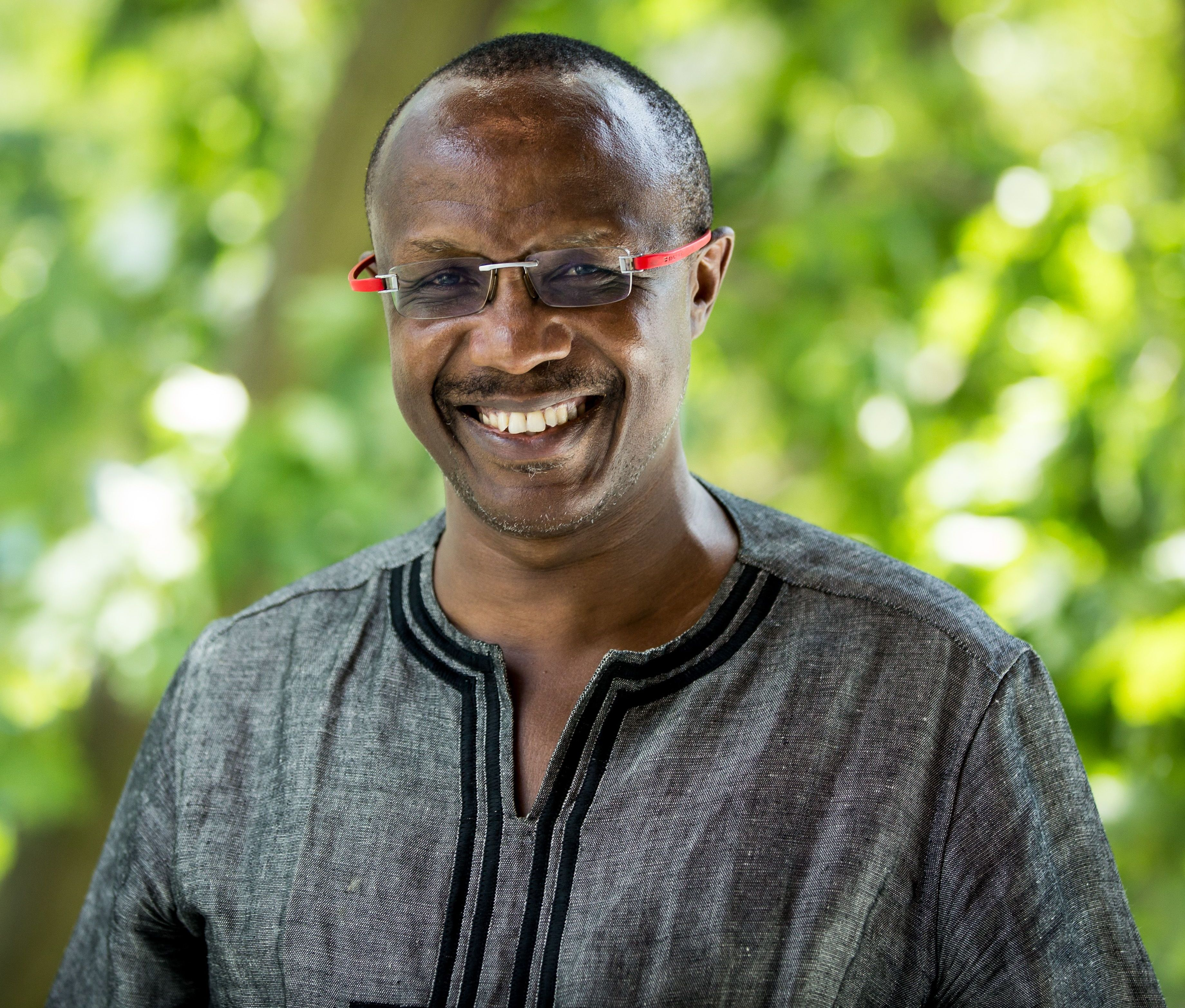
- David Ndii, 2017
- Born: David Ndìi; Kiambu, Kenya
- Education: University of Nairobi (Bachelor and Master); Oxford University (PhD)
- Occupations: Economist, columnist, journalist
- Spouse: Mwende Gatabaki

David Ndìi (born in Kiambu, Kenya) is an economist, a columnist, and an author. The Telegraph has described him as "one of Africa's best known economists and an outspoken anti-corruption crusader".

== Early life and education ==
He is a Rhodes scholar at Oxford University and an Eisenhower Fellow. Ndii holds a doctorate and master's degrees in economics from Oxford, masters and bachelor's degrees from the University of Nairobi.

== Politics ==
For several years, he was chief strategist of the National Super Alliance.

In recent years he has been an open critic of the economic policy of the Uhuru Kenyatta administration, writing several open letters and tweets criticizing the government's economic policies and borrowing of loans. This, among other things, led to him being barred from accessing the Technical University of Mombasa for "security reasons".

Ndìi opposed Kenyatta and Prime Minister Raila Odinga's signature handshake project, the Building Bridges Initiative. Together with other activists, he petitioned the High Court of Kenya in the landmark David Ndii & Others V. Attorney General & Others case which was argued all the way to the Supreme Court of Kenya leading to the collapse of the Building Bridges Initiative.

He would go on to support the presidential bid of William Ruto. He subsequently was involved in the crafting of the Kenya Kwanza manifesto which was anchored on the bottom-up economic agenda. After Ruto won the Presidency, Ndìi was appointed the chairperson of the President's Council of Economic Advisors (CEA) in President Ruto's State House.

More recently, David Ndìi has been responding to tweets on X (formerly Twitter) about government policy with what one news source called "unspeakable language". In one instance, he tweeted, "We will leave Kenya as corrupt as we found it. On this Sunday I suggest you contemplate your own life and leave the other sinners to contemplate theirs. Tomorrow we go back to matters Ceaser."

== Career ==
He is the chairman of the board of Zimele Asset Management Company Limited and the managing director of African Economics.

Ndìi has previously served as an economic advisor to the Government of Rwanda and led the NARC Economic Recovery Strategy (ERS) taskforce which was widely credited with the post-2003 economic recovery in Kenya. He cofounded Kenya's first independent policy think tank, the Institute of Economic Affairs, together with Prof. Anyang' Nyong'o.

Ndìi lectured at Strathmore University.
