= Constitutional reforms in Kenya =

Since Kenya gained independence in 1963, the constitution has been altered many times. During the early years of Kenya's existence, the constitution was abused by the president and the ruling party to gain and consolidate power. This was achieved through the creation of a single-party state, the abolition of secret ballots, and increasing the power and prestige that comes with the presidential position.

More recently, Kenya's constitution has become more democratic. The additions of a Prime Minister, two Deputy Prime Ministers, and the abolition of section 2A of the constitution (which had prevented Kenya from being a multi-party state) have all contributed to this reform.

== History of reform ==
Constitutional reform in Kenya has been a major issue since Kenya gained independence. The highlights of the evolution of Kenya's constitution can be highlighted by the following events:

- 1963 – Kenya's 1963 independence constitution provides for a multi-party parliamentary system. Jomo Kenyatta is installed as Kenya's first Prime Minister.
- 1964 – Kenya becomes a republic and Jomo Kenyatta becomes Kenya's first President, with the position of Prime Minister scrapped.
- 1966 – Provincial assemblies scrapped. Senate dissolved and its members combined with those of the House of Representatives into a unicameral National Assembly.
- 1969 – New constitution adopted, consolidating amendments already made to the 1963 independence constitution, and further strengthening presidential powers.
- 1976 – Constitutional amendment enabling president to pardon politicians barred from contesting elections over electoral malpractices. Opposition to amendment the leads to the arrest and imprisonment of Philomena Chelagat Mutai and George Anyona.
- 1982 – Multi-partyism is abolished making Kenya a single party state with KANU as the ruling party. This was followed by the mlolongo system where secret-ballots were no longer used.
- 1991 – President Moi in December 1991 at a KANU delegates meeting at Kasarani Stadium, repealed Section 2A of the constitution, thereby making Kenya a multi-party state. The change enabled the introduction of term limits to the Presidency.
- 2000 – Commission for Constitutional Reform of Kenya was set up by President Moi and Prof Yash Pal Ghai was installed as its chairman to spearhead Kenya's first major constitutional reform.
- 2005 – In November 2005, a constitutional referendum defeats government's proposed new constitution (see below).
- 2008 – In March 2008, the National Assembly of Kenya passed the Nation and Reconciliation Accord Act that introduced a temporary change to the constitution introducing the position of Prime Minister and two Deputy Prime Ministers.
- 2009 – Parliament prioritises constitution reform through Agenda No. 4. Deliberations on how this reforms will be tackled will be discussed in the second session of the 10th Parliament that began in April 2009.

Previous Proposed Constitution Drafts and processes

The 1969 Constitution which replaced the 1963 independence constitution had already been amended at least 12 times by 2010, and was widely agreed to require a major overhaul to create a more democratic framework with greater oversight of the executive by parliament. The constitution gave the president wide-ranging powers, provided for no prime minister, and was ill-suited to multiparty politics, despite the 1991 repeal of a 1982 amendment that had formalised the one-party state.

The constitutional reform process that began in 2000 led to the adoption of several competing drafts, and a deadlock between government and opposition, until 2008.

- 2004 Bomas Draft (named after the location of the constitutional reform conference that adopted it) – Proposed transferring most of the powers of the office of the President elected by the people to the Prime Minister that would be elected by Parliament. In addition, there would have been checks on executive appointments. The PM would nominate MPs to become Cabinet ministers, the President would then appoint them. All appointments would require up and down votes by a members of the Senate.
- 2005 Wako Draft (named after the Attorney General, Amos Wako) – Put forward unilaterally by the government instead of the Bomas Draft, which it rejected. A modified version of the 1969 constitution but got rid of 25% requirement in general elections that requires the winner in the presidential election to have 25% in at least 5 provinces. The winner would also have to get more than 50% of the vote, else an instant re-run would occur.
- 2005 A constitutional referendum defeated the proposed constitution supported by the government.
- Post-2005 Minimal Constitution Reform option – proposed by Prof. Yash Pal Ghai after the failed referendum. His proposal suggested that for political and practical reasons, the best way to achieve constitutional change would be to do it in small phases as opposed to immediate and complete overhaul of the current system.

Constitutional drafts and processes leading up to the adoption of the 2010 text

Following the post-election violence that broke out after the controversial December 2007 elections in which the renewed mandate of President Mwai Kibaki was alleged to be stolen, a team of mediators led by Kofi Annan, proposed by President Kufuor of Ghana, then chair of the African Union, pushed for a renewed constitutional review process. The National Dialogue and Reconciliation process led to an agreement between the parties in February 2008, including the formation of a government of national unity and other reforms. Agenda item 4 in the agreement focused on "Long-Term Issues", including constitutional and institutional reform.

- March 2008 – The parties agree on the principles for a constitutional review process, and Parliament establishes a Committee of Experts on Constitutional Reform to gather views from the public, deliberate on contentious issues and come up with a draft of the new constitution. A Constitution of Kenya Review Act 2008 governs the review process and enters into force in December 2008. The Committee held extensive public consultations and received many dozens of submissions.
- November 2009 – The harmonised draft constitution written and proposed by the Committee of Experts was released on 17 November 2009 and had the following highlights:
  - Transfer of executive authority from the President to the Prime Minister position who will be the Head of Government.
  - President will be the Head of State and maintain a more ceremonial role.
  - Prime Minister will be the Head of Government and will be the head of the party/coalition with a majority in Parliament – He will nominate ministers to the Cabinet.
  - Half of the ministers in cabinet can be nominated from non-MPs.
  - The total number of MPs will be increased from 222 to 295.
  - An upper house, a Senate, will be introduced to represent the regions – the total number of Senators will be 113.
  - Devolution to the provincial level – current 8 provinces will be now referred to as regions.
  - The 8 regions/provinces will be subdivided into counties – There will be a total of 70 counties and will each be headed by executives.
  - Nairobi Province will become a region and have a popularly elected Mayor as opposed to having the city councillors elect the Mayor.
  - Retention of Kadhi court system as it is in the current constitution.
- February 2010 – Following further consultation and amendment a revised text is published.
- May 2010 – On 6 May, the final text of the constitution is published, for approval by referendum.
- August 2010 – The draft constitution text is approved by a 67% margin in a national referendum. The constitution is promulgated on 27 August.
- October 2010 – On 5 October, parliament establishes the Constitutional Implementation Oversight Committee (CIOC), which is mandated to oversee the entire implementation process of the reforms required by the new constitution.

== See also ==
- Constitution of Kenya
- 10th Kenyan Parliament
- 2007–2008 Kenyan crisis
- Kenyan constitutional referendum, 2005
- Kenyan constitutional referendum, 2010
