= BBI =

BBI may refer to:

- Biju Patnaik Airport (IATA code: BBI) in Bhubaneswar, India
- Berlin-Brandenburg International Airport in Germany
- Blockbuster Inc. (NYSE ticker: BBI)
- Building Bridges Initiative, an attempted constitutional referendum in Kenya
- Burton Blatt Institute, research institute at Syracuse University
- Bijzondere Belastinginspectie, Federal Public Service of Belgium.
- Black, Brown, and Indigenous; see BIPOC
- Best Bowling in Innings, bowling statistics used in cricket
