= Death of Caroline Mwatha =

Kenyan human rights activist

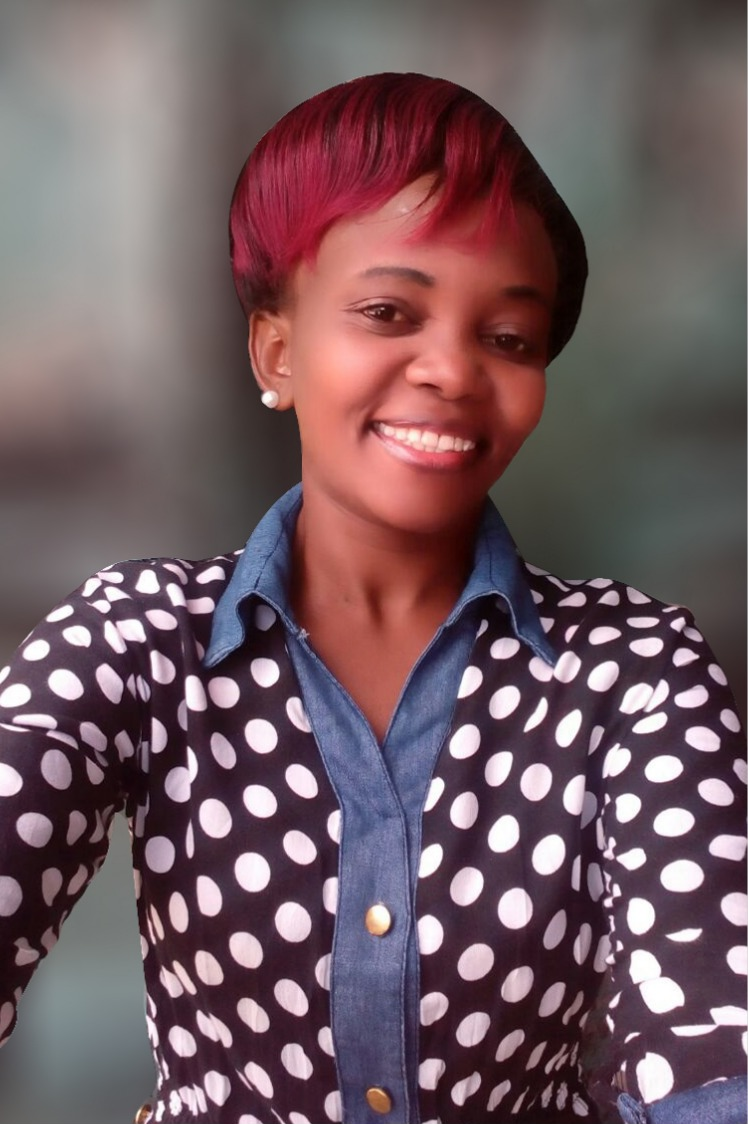
Caroline Mwatha

On 6 February 2019, 37-year-old Caroline Mwatha Ochieng’, a Kenyan human rights activist and founder of the Dandora Community Center (which investigates and documents cases of police killings in Dandora), went missing.

Her disappearance drew a lot of attention with Kenyans mobilising on social platforms such as Twitter, under the Hashtag #FindCarolineMwatha to draw attention on the matter. The then Nairobi Governor, Mike Sonko, promised a bounty of Ksh 300,000 to anybody who had any information regarding her whereabouts.

Her body was found in Nairobi's City mortuary on 12 February where it had been registered under a different name. Police reports established that she had died on 7 February. A post-mortem examination determined that she died due to exsanguination. The bleeding was caused by a rupture at the rear of her uterus, reportedly as the result of an unsafe abortion. The remains of a male fetus were still in the womb, minus a hand.

== Death ==
Her father, Stanslaus Mbai, and husband told reporters that they did not believe police reports, since they were unaware that she had been pregnant. Patrick Gathara of The Washington Post noted skepticism was warranted, since police had been involved with covering up the murders of human rights defenders in the past. A second, independent autopsy confirmed the cause of death. Amnesty International Kenya stated: "If Mwatha was not killed by State execution, she was killed by a system that allows crude abortion clinics to exist for its failure to provide safe abortion services."

== Aftermath of death ==
Memorial services were held on 21 February at Uhuru Park's Freedom Corner. They were attended by Chief Justice Willy Mutunga, politician Martha Karua and Nairobi Women Representative Esther Passaris. A Requiem Mass was refused by the Catholic Church because of its opposition to abortion. The funeral was on 23 February in Asembo Bay, Siaya County near her family's home. She is survived by her two children and a husband.

Eight people have been arrested on suspicion of involvement in the abortion, which is illegal in Kenya unless the mother's life is at risk. The clinic where the procedure was performed was not licensed to operate.

== See also ==
- List of solved missing person cases (post-2000)
