= Zimele Asset Management Company Limited =

Zimele Asset Management Company, Limited
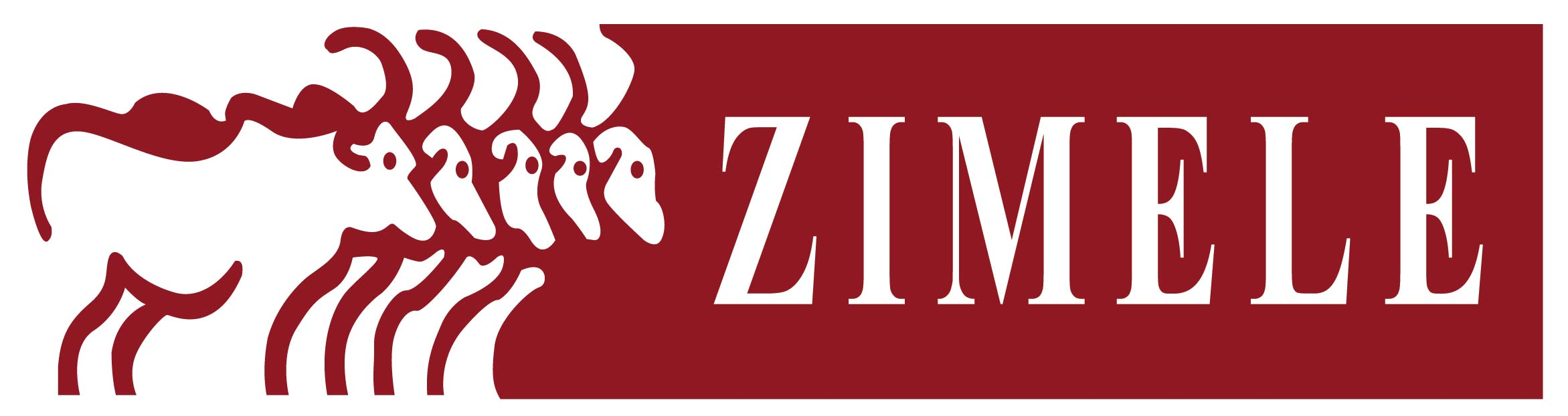
- Company type: Private
- Industry: Financial services
- Founded: August 1, 1998; 27 years ago in Nairobi, Kenya
- Headquarters: 7th floor, Ecobank Towers, Muindi Mbingu Street, Nairobi, Kenya
- Products: Investments, Money Market Fund, Balanced Fund, Pension Funds, Asset Management
- Website: www.zimele.co.ke

Zimele Asset Management Company, also Zimele (from Zulu, independent), is a Kenyan investment company licensed by the Retirement Benefits Authority (RBA) and the Kenyan Capital Markets Authority (CMA). The company offers financial products and services such as unit trusts, pension funds, fund management services, and investment advice.

With over Ksh 3 billion in funds under management, Zimele is one of the top fund managers in Kenya. The company has always targeted retail or individual clients, although it also provides investment advisory services to a range of corporate clients.

== History ==
The company was founded in August 1998 as a co-operative society under the name Zimele Multi-Purpose Co-operative Society Ltd.

In 2018, Zimele Asset Management was named in Kenya's Top 100 Mid-Sized Companies survey conducted by KPMG and Nation Media Group.

In 2019, the corporation blog was nominated for the BAKE Award in the category "Best Corporate Blog" but lost to the blog of "brightermonday.co.ke".

== Governance ==
Zimele's board is chaired by Dr. David Ndii. Other board members are Mrs. Njeri Kariuki, Mr. George Ooko, and Mr. Peter Waa.
