= BBI Judgement =

David Ndii & Others V. Attorney General & Others, also known as the BBI Judgement, was a landmark ruling made in the Kenya High Court on 13 May 2021, which issued an injunction on Kenya's Independent Electoral and Boundaries Commission (IEBC) from proceeding with President Uhuru Kenyatta's and retired Prime Minister Raila Odinga's Building Bridges Initiative. The five-judge bench was to determine seventeen questions raised on the petition against the BBI Process.

On 18 March 2018, President Uhuru Kenyatta and retired Prime Minister Raila Odinga had what is now referred to as the "handshake", an initiative which they termed as being "towards a united Kenya". Following this "handshake" with Mr. Odinga, the President appointed the Building Bridges to Unity Advisory Taskforce (BBI Taskforce) comprising 14 committee members and 2 joint secretaries through Gazette Notice No. 5154 of 24 May 2018.

In a unanimous decision, the bench, led by Justice Joel Ngugi, declared the process unconstitutional and prohibited the IEBC from conducting a referendum on the Constitution of Kenya (Amendment) Bill. The judges also ruled that the president had acted in excess of his powers by initiating the constitution amendment process through the Building Bridges Initiative (BBI). The judges described the BBI process as "a presidential initiative guised as a popular initiative", and allowing it to be sustained would amount to having the Head of State as promoter and referee of his own initiative. "In reality, BBI was the president's initiative which is contrary to article 257 of the Constitution. The task force that morphed to a steering committee was an unlawful and unconstitutional outfit. It was invalid from the beginning," said the judges. The court also held that a sitting president can be sued personally in civic proceedings if they act against the constitution for his actions or inaction. According to the court, President Uhuru Kenyatta should have entered into appearance in the petition because it was a civil case, instead of the Attorney General responding on his behalf.

== Background ==
Mr. Uhuru Kenyatta and Mr. Raila Odinga had just come off a hard-fought and intensely contested presidential election in 2017 in which they were the main contenders. The first round of presidential elections was held on 8 August 2017 and was characterized by allegations of vote fraud leading to its overturning by the Supreme Court. The repeat elections were held on 25 October 2017 but Mr. Raila Odinga boycotted - citing lack of electoral reforms, handing the victory to the incumbent.

The political climate remained charged with the opposition, led by Mr. Odinga, calling for a boycott of products and services from companies seen as beneficiaries of the marred electoral process. These boycotts and demonstrations, which could sometime turn violent, continued and culminated with a mock swearing in of Raila Odinga as the "Peoples President" on 30 January 2018. On 9 March 2018, President Uhuru and Mr. Raila Odinga brokered a deal to end the tension symbolized by a handshake outside Harambee House. During the launch of the BBI Report, Mr. Odinga revealed that they held a 19-hour talk with President Uhuru to deliberate on how to put an end to the tension. The president and Mr. Odinga had spent an hour alone at State House before they had "actual talk". They spent most of the night discussing the details of the agreement, inviting lawyers in the end to compile and draft the deal before the handshake was made public.

It is on these grounds that the President started an initiative which he described as being "towards a united Kenya." After the famous "handshake" with Mr. Odinga, the President appointed the Building Bridges Unity Advisory Taskforce comprising 14 committee members and 2 joint secretaries on 24 May 2018. The key mandate of the BBI Taskforce was to come up with recommendations and proposals for building a lasting unity in the country.

The BBI Taskforce came up with an interim report in November 2019. On 3 January 2020, through Gazette Notice No. 264, the President appointed the Steering Committee (BBI Steering Committee) on the Implementation of the Building Bridges comprising 14 members and 2 joint secretaries. The committee was led by Garissa County Senator, Senator Yusuf Haji. In November 2020, the Constitution of Kenya (Amendment) Bill, 2020 was introduced in parliament.

There was some controversy on how exactly the Report of the BBI Steering Committee, after it was handed over to the President, became the Constitution of Kenya Amendment Bill, 2020. Nonetheless, the BBI Secretariat submitted the signatures to the Independent Electoral and Boundaries Commission (IEBC), for verification and submission to the County Assemblies and Parliament for approval.

== Proceedings ==
This judgment arose from eight consolidated constitutional petitions which challenged, in some fashion the Building Bridges Initiative and the resulting Constitution Amendment Bill and its associated Popular Initiative. On 16 September 2020, economist Dr David Ndii, together with Jerotich Seii, James Ngondi, Wanjiru Gikonyo and Ikal Angelei moved to the High Court seeking determination of three key issues among them whether the basic structure of the constitution can be amended. Public defender Okiya Omtata was also among the petitioners.

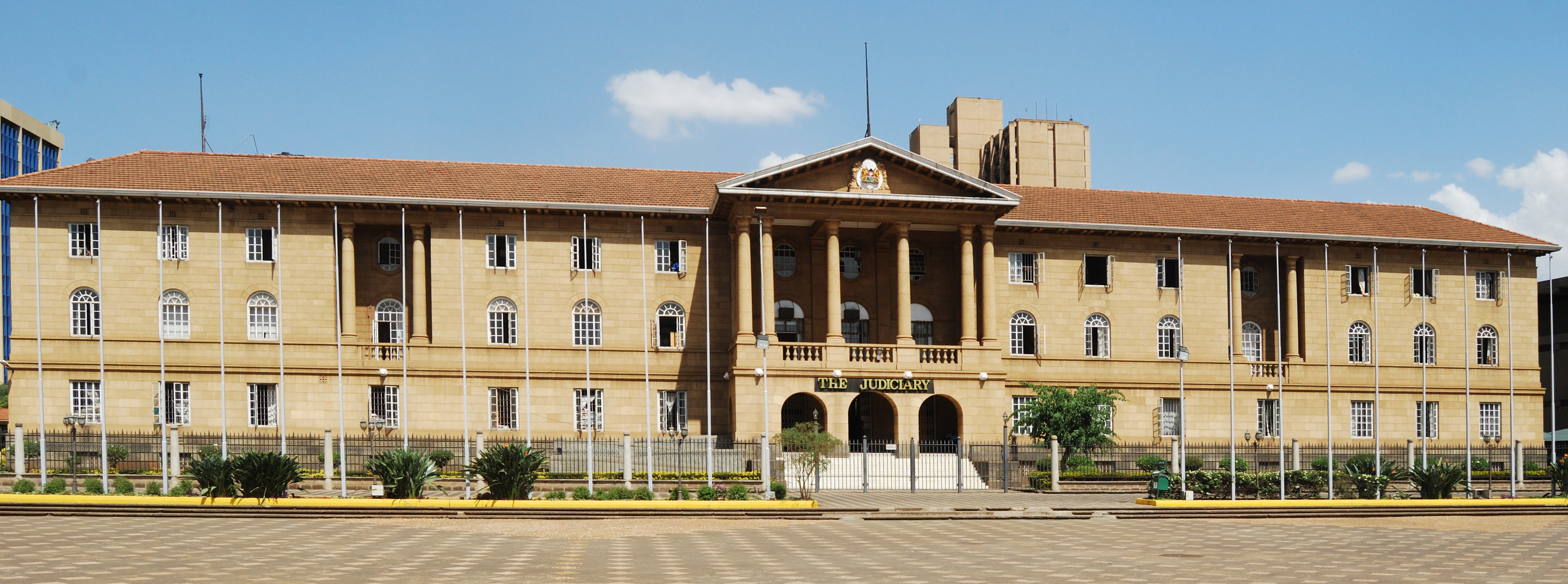
The Kenyan High Court

On 21 January 2021 the Kenya National Commission on Human Rights and four law professors were enjoined as amici curiae in Petition No. E282 of 2020. Seven of the eight petitions were consolidated on 21 January 2021 and the eighth petition-Petition No. E002 of 2021 was consolidated on 10 March 2021. Kituo Cha Sheria, a human rights NGO, was enjoined as an interested party in the same petition and Phylister Wakesho were enjoined as an interested party in Petition No. E400 of 2020. Petition No. E282 of 2020 was designated as the lead file. In February 2021, the High Court issued conservatory orders to the IEBC from facilitating a referendum. The Consolidated Petitions proceeded for hearing from 17 March 2021 to 19 March 2021 via video conference. The counsel for the petitioners included Law Society of Kenya president; Nelson Havi, LSK Upcountry Representative; Esther Ang'awa, Open Society Justice Initiative director; Waikwa Wanyoike, advocate of the High Court; Sing'Oei Korir.

The High Court was set to give a ruling on the petitioners case on 13 May 2021. Earlier that day, Kenyan MP Moses Kuria admitted in an interview with BBC to taking $1,000 parliamentary bribe to vote for the constitutional amendment bill known as the Building Bridges Initiative (BBI). Hon. Kuria alleged that the bribery happened in parliament. "It is not unusual for members to get this kind of an inducement", Hon. Kuria said, adding he would return the payment. The National Assembly had voted on 6 May 2021 to pass the Constitution of Kenya (Amendment) Bill, 2021; with 235 MPs voting yes, against the 83 votes for no and 2 abstained votes on the second reading. Majority leader Amos Kimunya denied that any bribery took place in parliament. Speaker of the National Assembly, Justine Muturi, suspended Gatundu South Constituency Member of Parliament, Moses Kuria, and Kiharu Constituency Member of Parliament, Ndidi Nyoro, to four consecutive parliament sittings for their claims. The Kenyan Senate had voted for the bill on 11 May 2021; with 51 voting yes, 12 voted no and 1 abstained.

=== Petitioners argument ===
The petitioners' lead argument was that the legal and judicial doctrines and theory of the basic structure of a constitution, the doctrine of constitutional entrenchment clauses, unamendable constitutional provisions, the doctrine of unconstitutional constitutional amendments, theory of unamendability of eternity clauses, essential features, supra-constitutional laws in a constitution and the implied limitations of the amendment power in the constitution are applicable in Kenya to substantively limit the ability to amend the Constitution under Articles 255-257 of the Constitution. The petitioners cited with approval works by Prof. Richard Albert especially his seminal book, Constitutional Amendments: Making, Breaking and Changing Constitutions. The petitioners further argued that it is the role of Parliament to protect the Constitution against tainted amendment bills and that the court has the role to declare a constitutional amendment unconstitutional in the event Parliament fails in its role.

They relied on various treatises and written works in constitutional law and social contract. The petitioners also cited at length the work of Prof Ben. Nwabueze. The primary cases they cited included Njoya and 5 Others Vs Attorney General & Others (2004) for establishing the juridical status of the doctrine of the Constituent Power in Kenya. They also heavily relied on Kesavananda Bharati v State of Kerala & Another (1973) 4 SCC 225 for establishing the Basic Structure Doctrine and applying it to the Indian context.

=== Respondents argument ===
The 1st respondent, the Honorable Attorney General of Kenya opposed the petition vide their grounds of opposition dated 18 January 2021. The Honorable Attorney General opposed the petition on two broad grounds: First, he argued that the doctrine of basic structure and the corollary doctrines of constitutional unamendability and eternity clauses which the petitioners invoked are inapplicable in Kenya. The Attorney General asserted that the petitioners had not made out a case for the application of the doctrine of basic structure and the corollary doctrines of constitutional unamendability and eternity clauses. The Honorable Attorney General argued that the petitioner's argument failed to consider "the unique cultural, historical developed Constitutional norms and national identity of the Kenyan Constitution."

Second, the Honorable Attorney General argued that the issues raised in the case are not justiciable. He contended that the Petitioners' case was speculative to the extent that the Petitioners presumed the contents of future amendments to the Constitution, without specifying the specific proposed amendments they objected to and to the extent that the Petitioners merely based their arguments on previous failed attempts at amending the Constitution. The Attorney General associated himself with the submissions of the Building Bridges to a United Kenya Taskforce National Secretariat on the issue of the Basic Structure Doctrine, to wit, that the same is not applicable in Kenya. They relied on the principle set out in the Indian cases of AK Gopalan vs the State (1950) SCR 88,120 (50) A Sc. 27 and Central Province Case1959 FC R 18 (39) AFC, which encouraged the application of the ut res magis valeat quam pareat doctrine ("It is better for a thing to have effect than to be made void.")

The Speaker of the National Assembly also argued that the Constitution of Kenya Amendment Bill was under consideration before Parliament and that, therefore, the Court lacked jurisdiction to intervene in an active Parliamentary process.

=== Ruling ===
In a unanimous ruling, the five-judge bench made up of presiding judge, Justice Joel Ngugi; Justice George Odunga; Justice Jairus Ngaah; Justice Teresia Matheka; and Justice Chacha Mwita declared the BBI Process as irregular, illegal and unconstitutional. The judges focused on 17 issues "which form the center of dispute surrounding the BBI initiative and forms the background of the final reliefs issued by the court," Justice Ngugi said. In a four-hour televised ruling, the judges said that President Kenyatta had violated the constitution by initiating a process which ought to have been started by ordinary citizens. They also ruled that the BBI constitutional committee, a body created by the president, was illegal, adding that Mr Kenyatta had failed the leadership and integrity test.

The court also said that the five million signatures collected by the BBI taskforce to support the initiative did not make it a citizen-led process.

==== Conclusions and findings ====
The court made the following conclusions and findings;

1. The text, structure, history and context of the Constitution of Kenya, 2010 all read and interpreted using the canon of interpretive principles decreed by the Kenyan Constitution yield the conclusion that the Basic Structure Doctrine is applicable in Kenya.
2. As applied in Kenya, the Basic Structure Doctrine protects certain fundamental aspects of the Kenyan Constitution from amendment through the use of either Secondary Constituent Power or Constituted Power.
3. The essential features of the Constitution forming the Basic Structure can only be altered or modified by the People using their Sovereign Primary Constituent Power and not merely through a referendum.
4. From a holistic reading of the Constitution, its history and the context of the making of the Constitution, the Basic Structure of the Constitution consists of the foundational structure of the Constitution as provided in the Preamble; the eighteen chapters; and the six schedules of the Constitution. It also includes the specific substantive areas Kenyans thought were important enough to pronounce themselves through constitutional entrenchment including land and environment; Leadership and Integrity; Public Finance; and National Security.
5. The Basic Structure Doctrine protects the core edifice, foundational structure and values of the Constitution but leaves open certain provisions of the Constitution as amendable through the procedures outlined in Articles 255, 256 and 257 of the Constitution in as long as they do not change the Basic Structure.
6. There are certain provisions in the Constitution which are insulated from any amendment at all because they are deemed to express categorical core values. These provisions are, therefore, unamendable and cannot be changed through the exercise of Secondary Constituent Power or Constituted Power.
7. The Sovereign Primary Constituent Power is only exercisable by the People after four sequential processes namely: civic education; public participation and collation of views; Constituent Assembly debate; and ultimately, a referendum.
8. The power to amend the Constitution through the Popular Initiative route under Article 257 of the Constitution is reserved for the private citizen. Neither the President nor any State Organ is permitted under the Kenyan Constitution to initiate constitutional amendments using the Popular Initiative.
9. Under Article 143(3) of the Constitution, the President can be sued in his or her personal capacity during his or her tenure in office except for actions or omissions ‘in respect of anything done or not done in the exercise of [his or her] powers under [the] Constitution.
10. The Constitution Amendment Bill, 2020 which was developed by the BBI Steering Committee and is being promoted by the BBI Secretariat is an initiative of the President. The President does not have constitutional mandate to initiate constitutional amendments through Popular Initiative under Article 257 of the Constitution.
11. To the extent that the BBI Steering Committee was employed by the President to initiate proposals to amend the Constitution contrary to Article 257 of the Constitution, the BBI Steering Committee is an unconstitutional entity.
12. Additionally, the BBI Steering Committee is unlawful because the President violated the provisions of Article of 132(4)(a) of the Constitution in its establishment.
13. In taking initiatives to amend the Constitution other than through the prescribed means in the Constitution, the President failed to respect, uphold and safeguard the Constitution and, to that extent, he has fallen short of the leadership and integrity threshold set in Article 73 of the Constitution and, in particular, Article 73(1)(a) thereof.
14. The history of Article 257 of the Constitution read together Articles 95(3) and 109(1) and (2) of the Constitution yields the conclusion that in order to effectively carry out referendum process as contemplated under the Kenyan Constitution, it is necessary that a specific legislation be enacted for that purpose.
15. Notwithstanding the absence of an enabling legislation as regards the conduct of referenda, such constitutional process may still be undertaken as long as the constitutional expectations, values, principles and objects especially those in Article 10 of the Constitution are met.
16. Parliament and the County Assemblies or any other State organ cannot under the guise of consideration and approval of a Popular Initiative to amend the Constitution under Article 257 of the Constitution alter or amend the Constitution Amendment Bill presented to them.
17. Article 255(1) of the Constitution yields the conclusion that each of the proposed amendment clauses ought to be presented as a separate referendum question.
18. Article 89(1) of the Constitution –which provides for the exact number of constituencies –while being part of the Basic Structure of the Constitution, is not an eternity clause: it can be amended by reducing or increasing the number of constituencies by duly following and perfecting the amendment procedures outlined in Articles 255 to 257of the Constitution.
19. The criteria and procedure for delimitation and apportionment of constituencies set out in Articles 89(4); 89(5); 89(6); 89(7); 89(10); 89(12)are unamendable constitutional provisions. They can only be amended by the exercise of Primary Constituent Power
20. It is unconstitutional for a Constitution of Kenya Amendment Bill to directly allocate and apportion constituencies in contravention of Article 89 of the Constitution.
21. The Independent Electoral and Boundaries Commission (IEBC) cannot conduct any proposed referendum because:
  1. It has no quorum: the quorum for the conduct of business by the IEBC is five Commissioners.
  2. It has not carried out nationwide voter registration.
  3. It has no legal/regulatory framework for the verification of signatures as required by Articles 257(4) of the Constitution.
22. In view of (xxi) above, all actions taken by the IEBC with respect to the Constitution Amendment Bill, 2020 are null and void.

==== Disposition ====
The court granted the following orders;

1. A declaration hereby issues:
  - That the Basic Structure Doctrine is applicable in Kenya.
  - That the Basic Structure Doctrine limits the amendment power set out in Articles 255 –257 of the Constitution. In particular, the Basic Structure Doctrine limits the power to amend the Basic Structure of the Constitution and eternity clauses.
  - That the Basic Structure of the Constitution and eternity clauses can only be amended through the Primary Constituent Power which must include four sequential processes namely: civic education; public participation and collation of views;Constituent Assembly debate; and ultimately, a referendum.
2. A declaration is hereby made that civil Court proceedings can be instituted against the President or a person performing the functions of the office of President during their tenure of office in respect of anything done or not done contrary to the Constitution.
3. A declaration is hereby made that the President does not have authority under the Constitution to initiate changes to the Constitution, and that a constitutional amendment can only be initiated by Parliament through a Parliamentary initiative under article 256 or through a Popular Initiative under Article 257 of the Constitution.
4. A declaration is hereby made that the Steering Committee on the Implementation of the Building Bridges to a United Kenya Taskforce Report established by the President vide Kenya Gazette Notice No. 264 of 3 January 2020 and published in a special issue of the Kenya Gazette of 10 January 2020 is an unconstitutional and unlawful entity.
5. A Declaration is hereby made that being an unconstitutional and unlawful entity, the Steering Committee on the Implementation of the Building Bridges to a United Kenya Taskforce Report, has no legal capacity to initiate any action towards promoting constitutional changes under Article 257 of the Constitution.
6. A declaration is hereby made that the entire BBI Process culminating with the launch of the Constitution of Kenya Amendment Bill, 2020 was done unconstitutionally and in usurpation of the People's exercise of Sovereign Power.
7. A declaration is hereby made hat Mr. Uhuru Muigai Kenyatta has contravened Chapter 6 of the Constitution, and specifically Article 73(1)(a)(i), by initiating and promoting a constitutional change process contrary to the provisions of the Constitution on amendment of the Constitution.
8. A declaration is hereby made that the entire unconstitutional constitutional change process promoted by the Steering Committee on the Implementation of the Building Bridges to a United Kenya Taskforce Report is unconstitutional, null and void.
9. A declaration is hereby made that the Constitution of Kenya Amendment Bill, 2020 cannot be subjected to a referendum before the Independent Electoral and Boundaries Commission carries out nationwide voter registration exercise.
10. A declaration is hereby made that the Independent Electoral and Boundaries Commission does not have quorum stipulated by section 8 of the IEBC Act as read with paragraph 5 of the Second Schedule to the Act for purposes of carrying out its business relating to the conduct of the proposed referendum including the verification of signatures in support of the Constitution of Kenya Amendment Bill under Article 257(4)of the Constitution submitted by the Building Bridges Secretariat.
11. A declaration is hereby made that at the time of the launch of the Constitutional of Kenya Amendment Bill, 2020 and the collection of endorsement signatures there was no legislation governing the collection, presentation and verification of signatures nor a legal framework to govern the conduct of referenda.
12. A declaration is hereby made that the absence of a legislation or legal framework to govern the collection, presentation and verification of signatures and the conduct of referenda in the circumstances of this case renders the attempt to amend the Constitution of Kenya through the Constitution of Kenya Amendment Bill, 2020 flawed.
13. A declaration is hereby made that County Assemblies and Parliament cannot, as part of their constitutional mandate to consider a Constitution of Kenya Amendment Bill initiated through a Popular Initiative under Article 257 of the Constitution, change the contents of such a Bill.
14. A declaration be and is hereby made that the Second schedule to the Constitution of Kenya (Amendment) Bill, 2020 in so far as it purports to predetermine the allocation of seventy constituencies is unconstitutional.
15. A declaration be and is hereby made that the Second schedule to the Constitution of Kenya (Amendment) Bill, 2020 in so far as it purports to direct the Independent Electoral and Boundaries Commission on its function of constituency delimitation is unconstitutional.
16. A declaration be and is hereby made that the Second schedule to the Constitution of Kenya (Amendment) Bill, 2020 in so far as it purports to have determined by delimitation the number of constituencies and apportionment within the counties is unconstitutional for want of Public Participation.
17. A declaration is hereby made that Administrative Procedures for the Verification of Signatures in Support of Constitutional Amendment Referendum made by the Independent Electoral and Boundaries Commission are illegal, null and void because they were made without quorum, in the absence of legal authority and in violation of Article 94 of the Constitution and Sections 5, 6 and 11 of the Statutory Instruments Act, 2013.
18. A declaration is hereby made that Article 257(10) of the Constitution requires all the specific proposed amendments to the Constitution be submitted as separate and distinct referendum questions to the People.
19. A permanent injunction be and is hereby issued restraining the Independent Electoral and Boundaries Commission from undertaking any processes required under Article 257(4) and (5)in respect of the Constitution of Kenya (Amendment) Bill 2020.
20. The prayer for an order that Mr. Uhuru Muigai Kenyatta makes good public funds used in the unconstitutional constitutional change process promoted by the Steering Committee on the Implementation of the Building Bridges to a United Kenya Taskforce Report established by Mr. Uhuru Muigai Kenyatta is declined for reasons that have been given.
21. The prayer for the orders that the Honourable Attorney General to ensure that other public officers who have directed or authorised the use of public funds in the unconstitutional constitutional change process promoted by the Steering Committee on the Implementation of the Building Bridges to a United Kenya Taskforce Report make good the said funds is declined from the reasons that have been given.
22. The rest of the reliefs in the Consolidated Petitions not specifically granted are deemed to have been declined.
23. This being a public interest matter, parties shall bear their own costs.

== Aftermath ==
There was mixed reaction to the ruling. A section of Murang'a town resident took to the streets to celebrate the ruling.

Kenya's Solicitor General, Kennedy Ogeto, filed a notice of appeal to the appellate court and was seeking to have the Constitutional and Human Rights Division at the High Court suspend implementation of the orders it issued. The Attorney General, Paul Kihara, said he was dissatisfied with the entire decision of the court and wanted implementation of the judgment suspended, pending determination of his appeal. ODM Party leader, Raila Odinga said he would calmly and respectfully move to the Court of Appeal to present their case as to why they thought the High Court did not render the right verdict. "We will do so with sobriety and with respect for our judges and courts" he added. BBI Secretariat co-chair, MP Junet Mohammed said he respected the decision of the court but didn't agree with it. He vowed to "fight to the bitter end until a new Kenya is realised."

The Deputy President of Kenya, William Ruto, reacted on his Twitter account posting "There is a God in heaven who loves Kenya immeasurably. May God's name be praised forever."Senior Counsels Ahmednasir Abdullahi and Taib Ali Taib termed the ruling as solid, saying an appellate process would require the annulment of multiple decrees issued by the court. "[T]hrough the BBI judgment, the Judiciary has staked out its claim to independence, in as profound and as dramatic a manner as is possible. Whatever one thinks of the judgment, the real cause for celebration is this fearless declaration of independence by the Judiciary" wrote Senior Counsel Taib Ali Taib. Narc Kenya Party Leader and 2013 presidential candidate, Senior Counsel Martha Karua, tweeted "Congrats to Jerotich Seii, David Ndii and all those who boldly petitioned the courts culminating in today's historic ruling." Kenyan Human Rights lawyer and politician, Gitobu Imanyara wrote an OpED on The Daily Nation noting "the court has saved our hard-won constitution from the most serious assault it has faced during the ten years of its existence."

Indian Constitutional Scholar and author, Gautam Bhatia called the ruling "an instant classic" noting that "the BBI Judgment is a landmark judicial verdict that will be studied by students of constitutional law across the world, in the days to come." Professor of world constitutions & director of constitutional studies at University of Texas School of Law, Professor Richard Albert said the ruling was historic and congratulated the petitioners.
