= Constitution of Kenya (1963) =

Kenya's 1963 Constitution, also called the Independence Constitution, was based on the standard "Lancaster House template" used for the former British colonies in Africa, was subject to early amendments, and was replaced in 1969.

Under the Constitution of Kenya, the British monarch, Queen Elizabeth II, was represented as head of state by a Governor-General of Kenya. The Constitution also provided for a bicameral parliament, the National Assembly, consisting of the Senate and the House of Representatives. Each province had an elected assembly.

In 1964, the Constitution was amended to make the country a republic with the President as both head of state and head of government, and in 1966, the membership of the Senate and House of Representatives was combined to form a unicameral National Assembly.

== History ==
=== The KANU and the KADU ===
The Kenya African National Union (KANU) and the Kenya African Democratic Union (KADU) were the two major political parties in Kenya during the early 1960s, KANU being the more popular of the two. The KADU and the KANU had opposing views on government structure and as both parties were involved in the development of the Independence Constitution, this made the process more difficult as evident throughout the Independence Conferences.

The KANU were pushing for a largely centralized government structure where power would be concentrated at the center while the KADU were proponents to regionalism, where power would vary distributed across a variety of geographical regions.

=== The Independence Conferences ===
Between the years 1960 and 1963, three Independence Conferences, also named the Lancaster House Conferences (Kenya), were held between British officials, European settlers, and a Kenyan delegation at Lancaster House. These conferences were instrumental in setting Kenya up for independence from the British and for uniting the political factions in Kenya. The Independence Conferences represented two things. One, that there was a great imbalance of power that Britain still had over Kenya even at the brink of independence and two, that there were deep internal divisions between Kenya's political factions that posed a threat to the stability of the fledgeling independent state.

Before "setting Kenya free" the British wanted to ensure that their interests were still a part of the decision making system in Kenya. The KANU and KADU had continual disagreements over the course of the first two conferences which prevented any true progress from being made.

==== Independence Conference of 1960 ====
At this conference that it was decided that Kenya's constitution would be based on the Westminster model. Both the Kenyan delegation and British government brought demands to the table which were not agreed on and so this conference ended with no formal decisions made.

==== Independence Conference of 1962 ====
Political animosity continued between the KADU and KANU. Their disagreements also took attention from the needs of native Kenyans who were not well-represented at these conferences.

==== Independence Conference of 1963 ====
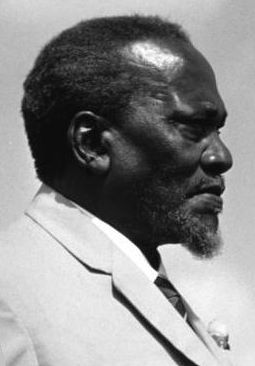
Jomo Kenyatta, First President of Kenya

Jomo Kenyatta became the Prime Minister of Kenya after the 1963 general election which resulted in the KANU being the dominant political party in Kenya. As a result, the political tensions that had been present at previous Independence Conferences were absent at this final conference. The Independence Conferences took place between 25 September and 19 October 1963 and the Independence Constitution was finally completed. On 12 December 1963 Kenya officially declared its independence.

== Basic Outline ==
As the Independence Constitution was based on the Westminster system, it followed the basic structure of having a legislative, executive, and judiciary branch. The Constitution also outlined a Bill of Rights.

=== Chapters ===
Chapter 1: Citizenship
Chapter 2: Protection of Fundamental Rights and Freedoms of the Individual
Chapter 3: The Governor-General
Chapter 4: Parliament
Chapter 5: Executive Powers
Chapter 6: Regions
Chapter 7: Special Provisions Relating to Legislative and Executive Powers of the Centre and the Regions
Chapter 8: Finance
Chapter 9: Police
Chapter 10: The Judicature
Chapter 11: The Public Service of Kenya
Chapter 12: Land
Chapter 13: Local Government
Chapter 14: Alternation of Regional Boundaries
Chapter 15: Miscellaneous

=== Bill of Rights ===
==== Property ====
1. The compulsory acquisition of the property of any individuals must have public justifications.
2. The justification for the acquisition of the property of another must be reasonable.
3. Those who have their property taken are entitled to full compensation for their loss.

==== Discrimination ====
The Kenyan Constitution states that no law may be made to discriminate against another nor may any person discriminate against another and claim it was justified through law or governmental authority.

However, for all that it says against discrimination, the Constitution does permit some forms of discrimination. A distinction was made between legislative action and administrative action, and the former allowed discrimination in certain cases.

==== Citizenship ====
The idea of citizenship was a complicated issue because at the time of their independence, there were many different immigrant communities living in Kenya. Immigrants in Kenya were unsure if they wanted to be citizens of Kenya and Kenyans weren't sure that they trusted the allegiances of immigrants enough to make them dual citizens.

In the end, most indigenous people automatically became citizens in Kenya. For anyone else to become a citizen automatically, they had to have been born by Kenya's Independence Day, had one parent born in Kenya, and a citizen of the United Kingdom.

=== Government Structure ===
==== Legislature ====
Kenya's legislature was bicameral with 41 Senators in the Senate and 129 Members in the House of Representatives. With the creation of the third amendment, the legislature became a unicameral National Assembly.

==== Executive ====
In 1963, the head of state was Queen Elizabeth II who was represented through a governor-general in Kenya. This governor-general could then select a prime minister from whichever political party had the majority in the House of Representatives.

==== Judiciary ====
Members of the judiciary were selected by the Judicial Service Commission. A Public Service Commission was created to establish a way for each of the six Regions to have representation in government. Primary function was to uphold the Constitution.

==== Regions ====
A highly contested section of the Constitution. Kenya essentially had two sources of power, central and regional, but power from the central government was always seen as a threat to the power of the regions. Minority groups in Kenya were able to petition for provisions to be added to the constitution to preserve some of their power. Under the Independence Constitution, seven regions were defined, each with their own legislature and Executive.

== Amendments ==
Between the years 1964 and 1969, the Independence Constitution had 10 amendments added to it.

No.	Action	Year	Description
1	28	1964	Established Kenya as a Republic with a president and set up structures for succession.
2	38	1964	Began stripping power from regional governments.
3	14	1965	Completed the destabilization of regionalization and weakened the amendment process for the constitution.
4	17	1966	Enforced attendance requirements for members of parliament and gave the President the power to appoint and fire public officials.
5	17	1966	Outlined what would force a member of parliament to give up his position.
6	18	1966	Gave the President increased power while removing the power in other branches to check the executive.
7	40	1966	Established a unicameral legislature.
8	16	1968	Abolished regionalism.
9	45	1968	General Election established as the way to elect a president.
10	5	1969	Brought together previously listed amendments.

== Reception of the Independence Constitution ==
From the start of the Independence Conferences in 1960, Kenyans were averse to the idea of basing their constitution on the Westminster model. Kenyans struggled to see how Western forms of government would work with traditional Kenyan systems. It was clear that although this was named the Independence Constitution, the British still had a high level of control over their former colony. Additionally, while the interests of the KANU and KADU can be seen throughout the Independence Constitution, the concerns of minority tribes and people throughout Kenya were rarely considered. This led to violence and unrest from minorities like the Somalis and the Arabs in 1963.

The KANU, supporters of a central government, openly opposed the regional aspects of the constitution. Their lack of support toward upholding the constitution as a whole served to weaken it as the KANU worked to strip power from that section.

Considering that at the time of the Independence Constitution's completion Kenya had only been independent for around ten years, it may not be surprising that most Kenyans did not regard the Constitution as an especially important political document. When it came to political issues, Kenyans would instead defer to other ways of resolving conflicts. It would take several more years and the establishment of later constitutions for it to hold a higher level of legitimacy for Kenyans.

== Transition from Independence Constitution and Establishment of Dictatorship ==
Since the first Lancaster Conference, it was apparent that the Independence Constitution would not be a lasting document. Its foundation in Western government structures, overly complex and difficult to understand provisions, and lack of Kenyan representation made the 1963 Constitution something that majority of Kenyans could not agree on. In 1969, a new constitution was created which consolidated all the amendments to the 1963 constitution and clarified much of what was confusing before. This coincided with the establishment of a de facto one-party state after the main opposition party was simultaneously banned, leading to the Kenya African National Union establishing complete dominance of the Kenyan state until opposition parties were once again legalized in 1991.

== See also ==
- Constitution of Kenya, 2010
- Constitutional Reforms in Kenya
- Kenyan constitutional referendum, 2005
