= Abortion in Kenya =

Abortion in Kenya is prohibited with the exception of certain circumstances including danger to the life and health of the expectant mother, and rape. Unsafe abortions are a major cause of deaths and health complications for women in Kenya.

Voice of America: Kenya debate ignites over issue of unsafe abortions, reporting on abortion statistics in Kenya (2019). Video 3:25 m.

== Legislative policy and legal status ==
=== The Constitution ===
Abortion in Kenya is regulated by Article 26(4) of the Constitution of Kenya (2010), which states that:

Abortion is not permitted unless, in the opinion of a trained health professional, there is need for emergency treatment, or the life or health of the mother is in danger, or if permitted by any other written law.

The 2010 Kenyan constitutional referendum that introduced article 26 broadened access to abortion by allowing it for maternal health reasons. Prior to the 2010 referendum, criminalization for abortion was common, especially that of abortion providers. A well-known court case in Kenya took place in 2004 where three healthcare workers were charged with murder after performing an abortion in the Republic v. Nyamu and Others case. Although access has been broadened by Article 26, due to the lack of specificity in the rhetoric of the 2010 clause in the Constitution debates about abortion in Kenya continue. Many providers are reluctant to offer abortions because of the uncertainty regarding whether they would be legally backed and protected under the Constitution regardless of providing safe options to abort.

Prior to the re-draft of the 2010 constitution, many Kenyan anti-abortion advocates and religious leaders, with the support of U.S. pro-life organizations, stood in opposition of the 2010 version of the Constitution of Kenya due to the inclusion of the article concerning abortion. The National Council of Churches of Kenya, which feared it would lead to the legalisation of abortion, opposed the amendment. Those promoting anti-abortion agendas proposed seven amendments to Article 26 of the new drafted 2010 Constitution. Due to the persistent efforts of the Kenyan Federation of Women Lawyers (FIDA) and other women's choice organizations, the amendments were never implemented.

=== The Kenyan Penal Code ===
The 2012 [2010] revision of The Kenyan Penal Code Chapter 63 incorporates and prescribes punishments regarding abortion laws. Sections 158-160 directly address women aborting or miscarrying.

Section 158: Attempts to procure abortion

Any person who, with intent to procure miscarriage of a woman, whether she is or is not with child, unlawfully administers to her or causes her to take any poison or other noxious thing, or uses any force of any kind, or uses any other means whatever, is guilty of a felony and is liable to imprisonment for fourteen years.

Section 159: The like by woman with child

Any woman who, being with child, with intent to procure her own miscarriage, unlawfully administers to herself any poison or other noxious thing, or uses any force of any kind, or uses any other means whatever, or permits any such thing or means to be administered or used to her, is guilty of a felony and is liable to imprisonment for seven years.

Section 160: Supplying drugs or instruments to procure abortion

Any person who unlawfully supplies to or procures for any person any thing whatever, knowing that it is intended to be unlawfully used to procure the miscarriage of a woman whether she is or is not with child, is guilty of a felony and is liable to imprisonment for three years.

Additionally, Section 240 of the Kenyan Penal Code (Cap 63) provides further clarification of the basis of surgical operations in relation to a mother's health and unborn children.

Section 240: Surgical operation

A person is not criminally responsible for performing in good faith and with reasonable care and skill a surgical operation upon any person for his benefit, or upon an unborn child for the preservation of the mother's life, if the performance of the operation is reasonable, having regard to the patient's state at the time and to all the circumstances of the case.

=== Abortion and rape ===
After the growth of sexual violence coupled with the overall post election violence of the 2007-2008 Kenyan crisis, Kenya saw a need to address the threat and the various consequences of sexual violence, particularly against women and girls, that had risen in the country. Although Kenya's Ministry of Health did not intend to include abortion in the debate at the time, a decade later the topic of rape and abortion was clarified in the Supreme Court. Pregnancies that are the result of a rape can be terminated by experts, a June 2019 judgment by the Supreme Court ruled. The court was compelled to advise health workers to provide safe and legal abortion in a petition by the Kenyan Federation of Women Lawyers (FIDA).

== Impact of abortion laws ==
Due to the limitations placed on abortions in the constitution, women often seek secretive and illegal methods of obtaining an abortion in Kenya.

=== Historical context ===
Aside from the cultural stigmas associated with abortion as a result of traditional customs and religious beliefs, many limiting abortion laws throughout Africa are rooted in rules and regulations set during the colonial era.

During the 1990s, there were increased opposition movements against educating adolescents on sexual reproductive health headed by religious and political leaders in Kenya. Both Catholic and Muslim religious leaders led public demonstrations in August 1995. President Daniel arap Moi supported these movements until 1999 when he declared support for the purveying of contraception amidst the HIV/AIDS epidemic in Kenya. This began a new wave of debates and discourse regarding contraception and sexual reproductive health on a public stage in Kenya. In the 1980s and 90s, and in regards to abortion specifically, the Kenyatta National Hospital's data reveals "incomplete abortions accounted for more than half of all the gynecological admissions."

=== Unsafe abortion practices ===
Some of the reasons why Kenyan women choose unsafe methods for abortion is due to the stigma of terminating a pregnancy, the fear of reduction of privacy as well as the lack of education and knowledge about reproductive health and contraceptive options in Kenyan society. Women who choose clandestine abortions may find services from doctors at private clinics, midwives, herbalists, or terminate their pregnancy on their own. A 2014 study reveals various methods Kenyan women claim to use to induce abortions independently of a medical clinic or medical provider. Among some of the most prevalent answers included tea leaves, quinine, detergent and bleach, undiluted fruit juice, traditional herbs, a metal rod, wire, or stick inserted into the uterus, and overdoses of paracetamol and malaria pills.

Post-abortion complications and delays in care-seeking are also underlying causes for mortality rates in Kenya. Post-abortion admissions have seen over 75% of patients with moderate to severe ailments. Studies have revealed that the largest delays in seeking post-abortion care are from adolescents and young adults aged 10-19, and that higher incidents of abortion complications occur within these ages. While dangerous abortion practices can result in moderate to severe complications such as localized peritonitis and sepsis, maternal deaths have been revealed as a paramount consequence of unsafe abortions.

Article 26 of the 2010 Constitution and its allowance of abortions taking into consideration the health of the mother has prompted public sectors to offer a higher degree of access to abortions. In this regard, many providers have not been trained properly or are equipped to provide safe services due to the lack of specificities in the constitution and safe practices. While the constitution allows for abortion under specific circumstances, not all abortions are being administered safely, and due to other cultural implications such as stigmatization, women are still seeking and utilizing life-threatening methods of procuring abortions.

Safe abortions provided by trained professionals in hygienic settings correlate with fewer health risks than unsafe abortion practices. Due to the restrictive laws on abortion in Kenya, there continues to be limited access to safe options for women. As a result, many organizations have called for scaling up the number of safe abortion providers.

=== Family planning and post abortion care ===
Because the delay in seeking care following safe or unsafe abortion is a cause for higher complications post abortion, there have been pushes to establish more access to family planning and post abortion care in Kenya. Post abortion care tends to refer to emergency medical treatment, but also incorporates family planning for the patient. In combination, these services include counseling, education about reproductive health, and distribution of contraceptives. A suggested increase in family planning in Kenya may also curb repeat abortions for some women.

The 2008-2009 Kenya Demographic and Health Survey uncovered that 43% of women in Kenya who gave birth in the previous five years from when the report was documented communicated the births as "unwanted or mistimed". This statistic reflects the usage, or lack thereof of contraceptives in Kenya. According to a Guttmacher Institution report, 12-17% of poor and uneducated married women use modern contraceptives in Kenya, while 48-52% of wealthy and educated married women in Kenya use and have access to modern birth control methods. An organization that has addressed these shortages and needs relating to reproductive health is Marie Stopes International. Since its opening in Kenya in 1985, Marie Stopes has served as the largest reproductive health services and family planning clinic in Kenya. As reported by Marie Stopes Kenya, in 2019 the health center prevented 180,000 unsafe abortions through post abortion care and family planning.

Other organizations and activist groups including the Center for Reproductive Rights and FIDA use their resources and legal platforms to fight for more accessible and equitable care for women seeking reproductive health services and abortions in Kenya.

== Socio-cultural opinions and impacts on abortion ==
Reasoning for abortion often varies on a case-to-case basis, but for both married and unmarried Kenyan women, economic objectives are frequently a primary concern. For single women, common reasons also include their single status, unemployment, and economic dependence on a family member that may hinder their desire to bear a child.

=== Stigmatization ===
There are many cultural stigmas that are associated with women and terminating a pregnancy. In Kenya, both women seeking abortions and abortion providers are met with socio-cultural disgrace and discrimination, and abortion remains a taboo topic across the country. A combination of traditional cultural expectations and religious beliefs formulate stigmas against abortions. Many stigmas are based on the belief that a woman's purpose is to bear children and her role in society is to be a mother. In regards to young girls and adolescents, there are social and cultural expectations that young people should refrain from sexual activity and maintain innocence.

Research has revealed that young, unmarried women from lower socioeconomic classes feel a higher burden from these cultural stigmas. The same research has also revealed that stigma is a root cause for reluctance and untimeliness of seeking post-abortion care.

== Statistics ==
On the continent of Africa as a whole, 97% of abortions are unsafely performed. Unsafe abortion is predicted to account for 35% of maternal deaths in Kenya, whereas in East Africa as a whole unsafe abortions account for 18%.

A survey of 2012 by the Kenyan Ministry of Health, African Population and Health Research Center and IPSAS found that there were 464,000 abortions induced that year, which translates to an abortion rate of 48 per 1,000 women aged 15–49; and an abortion ratio of 30 per 100 live births. A study analyzing this survey reveals of the reported abortions in 2012, 116,000 of them, nearly 25%, were treated for complications. Within the women who faced complications from abortions, 87,000 of cases were moderate to severe complications, and 40,000 of the complications were experienced by women who were 19 years old and younger. Hospital-based data reveals that between 2004 and 2012 the estimated number of induced abortions increased in Kenya. About half (49%) of all pregnancies in Kenya were unintended and 41% of unintended pregnancies ended in an abortion. Marie Stopes International estimates that 2,600 women die from unsafe abortions annually, an average seven deaths a day. Nearly 120,000 women are hospitalized each year due to abortion-related complications.

The publication of the 2012 survey in 2018 and the death of activist Caroline Mwatha in February 2019 following an unsafe abortion brought the debate on abortion to the forefront in 2019.

== See also ==
- Health in Kenya
- Women in Kenya
