= Religious court =

Religious court may refer to either a religious group's internal tribunal, or a state-affiliated court with religious jurisdiction:

- Beth din, in Judaism
- Ecclesiastical court, in Christianity
- Islamic court

== See also ==
- Separation of church and state
