= Kadhi courts =

Kadhi courts or Kadhi's courts are a court system in Kenya that enforce limited rights of inheritance, family, and succession for Muslims. The history of Kadhi courts extends prior to the colonization of East Africa in the 19th century, and the courts continued under British rule and after Kenyan independence in 1963. An estimated 7% to 20% of the population of Kenya is Muslim.

In May 2010, a three-judge bench of the High Court ruled that the inclusion of Kadhi courts in current Constitution was illegal and discriminatory.

A new Constitution of Kenya approved by referendum on August 4, 2010 establishes the Kadhi court system as a subordinate court under the superior courts of Kenya (Supreme Court, Court of Appeal, and High Court).

The language of the new constitution (section 170) states, "There shall be a Chief Kadhi and such number, being not fewer than three, of other Kadhis as may be prescribed under an Act of Parliament.... The jurisdiction of a Kadhi's court shall be limited to the determination of questions of Muslim law relating to personal status, marriage, divorce or inheritance in proceedings in which all the parties profess the Muslim religion and submit to the jurisdiction of the Kadhi's courts". The establishment of Kadhi courts in the proposed constitution was a subject of debate, especially among Christian church leaders.

== See also ==
- Qadi
- Constitution of Kenya
- Proposed Constitution of Kenya, 2010
- Kenyan constitutional referendum, 2010
