= 2005 Kenyan constitutional referendum =

21 November 2005
- Are you for or against the ratification of the proposed new constitution?

Results
Choice	Votes	%
Yes	2,578,831	41.88%
No	3,579,241	58.12%
- Results by province

A constitutional referendum was held in Kenya on 21 November 2005. Although many government officials, including President Mwai Kibaki, had campaigned for a "yes" vote, the proposed new constitution was rejected by 58% of voters.

Despite the rising number of literate voters in Kenya (74%), ballot papers used symbols as well as text to indicate the choices. Supporters of the new constitution were assigned the symbol of a banana, while the opposition was assigned the orange, ultimately leading to the opposition group being named the Orange Democratic Movement.

The referendum divided the ruling National Rainbow Coalition into camps for and against the proposal, as well as spurring violence between Orange and Banana supporters; nine people died during the campaign period spread over several months, but the process itself was peaceful.

== Draft constitution ==
During the drafting of the constitution there were disagreements over how much power should be vested in the President, with many believing Kibaki was attempting to garner dictatorial powers. In previous drafts, those who feared a concentration of power in the president added provisions for a power-sharing between the President and Prime Minister. However, the final draft of the constitution retained sweeping powers for the Head of State.

The issue of land reform was also prevalent due to the frequency of land disputes between ethnic groups. The draft constitution sought to deal with this and included measures against the ownership of land by foreigners (European immigrants and their descendants own numerous large tracts of land in Kenya). The constitution would have also permitted women to own land for the first time, although only through inheritance, and sought to establish a "Land Commission" that would manage and oversee the redistribution of land (the formation of a commission was included primarily as a means of preventing the gifting of land by government officials in return for favours). The commission would also serve as a human rights watchdog over land disputes and would attempt to give back land to ethnic groups and individuals who had unfairly lost land in the past.

The constitution sought also to classify land as either government, community, or individual property. Many had been alarmed by a more radical provision which would allow the land commission to redistribute land that was "idle"—not being used to its fullest potential—to the landless and squatters. This met the most resistance amongst absentee land owners and nomadic groups such as the Maasai, whose land could potentially be repossessed.

Religious courts were also an area of concern prior to the voting. Since Islamic religious courts already existed in Kenya, demands for courts specific to other religions (mainly Christian and Hindu) were adhered to and the draft constitution provided a legal basis for a number of religious judiciaries.

== Campaign ==
Because Kibaki so vigorously promoted the new constitution and based his election campaign around it, many voters used the referendum merely as means to voice their approval or disapproval of the Kibaki government. This would become the sentiment on which the victorious Orange camp would base their demands for snap elections, claiming the government had lost its mandate to rule as a result of the "no" vote by the people.

== Opinion polls ==
There was a single opinion poll taken by Steadman International, which showed 42% against, 32% for and 22% undecided, with 4% refusing to answer.

== Results ==
Are you for or against the ratification of the proposed new constitution?

Choice	Votes	%
For	2,578,831	41.88
Against	3,579,241	58.12
Total	6,158,072	100.00
Registered voters/turnout	11,595,201	–
Source: African Elections Database

=== By province ===
Province	For		Against		Total	Registered voters	Turnout
Province	Votes	%	Votes	%	Total	Registered voters	Turnout
Central	1,023,219	93.2	74,394	6.8	1,097,613	1,795,277	61.1
Coast	64,432	19.3	269,655	80.7	334,087	967,518	34.5
Eastern	485,282	49.5	494,624	50.5	979,906	1,977,480	49.6
Nairobi	161,344	43.2	212,070	56.8	373,414	961,295	38.8
North Eastern	12,401	24.1	39,028	75.9	51,429	237,321	21.7
Nyanza	114,077	12.2	822,188	87.8	936,265	1,664,401	56.3
Rift Valley	395,943	24.5	1,218,805	75.5	1,614,748	2,668,981	60.5
Western	240,582	40.2	358,343	59.8	1,322,604	598,925	45.3
Total	2,532,918	41.7	3,548,477	58.3	6,081,395	11,594,877	52.4
Source: Electoral Commission of Kenya

== Aftermath ==
After voters rejected a draft constitution, President Kibaki dismissed his entire cabinet and deputy ministers, moving quickly to reassert his political authority. Kibaki said of his decision, "Following the results of the Referendum, it has become necessary for me, as the President of the Republic, to re-organise my Government to make it more cohesive and better able to serve the people of Kenya."

Although the dismissal of individual officials is commonplace in government, the dissolution of the cabinet in its entirety is rare. The only member of the cabinet office to be spared a midterm exit was the Attorney General, whose position was constitutionally protected against Kibaki's presidential powers. Vice-President Moody Awori retained his post; however, he was deprived of his position as Minister of Home Affairs. The dismissal of the cabinet followed a seven-month period in which its members never actually met formally, instead preferring to make political statements through the media. Kibaki pledged to appoint a new cabinet within two weeks, prior to which he would be managing the nation's affairs single-handedly.

The cabinet had been increasingly divided for an extended period of time, and the issue of the constitution had created further fracturing. Because the National Rainbow Coalition was a grouping of several smaller parties (the Democratic Party, FORD–Kenya, Liberal Democratic Party, and NPK), members of the Kibaki government maintained differing agendas and loyalties, often being more loyal to their party than to the coalition. Corruption charges and investigations into the affairs of the cabinet had gone undisciplined by the president, who had been criticized for not reeling in his officials.

The response to the sacking of the cabinet and ministers by Kenyans, as a result, was overwhelmingly positive. However, the opposition spearheaded by the Orange Democratic Movement (whose key members consist of a number of MPs from the now moribund cabinet) expressed that Kibaki had not gone far enough and a dissolution of both the legislature and administration was necessary. This combined with the referendum's failure and Kibaki's inability to deliver on his campaign promises caused an increase in demands for new elections for the entire Kenyan government by the opposition leaders.

After rallies on 27 November 2005 by the opposition demanding new elections as soon as possible, the Kenyan government outlawed all demonstrations in support of new elections. The Kibaki government dismissed the idea of early elections, and claimed that such gatherings were a "threat to national security". The opposition encouraged nationwide pro-election demonstrations and scheduled a rally led by the Orange team at Mombasa Municipal Stadium for 10 December. The government called in police to seal off access the stadium and prevent the rally from taking place. All other pro-election rallies throughout the country were suppressed by law enforcement. Kibaki postponed the reconvening of the Legislature, which was scheduled to resume its affairs on 6 December.

=== Cabinet appointment ===
As promised, on 7 December 2005 President Kibaki announced his new appointments for his cabinet and empty minister positions. However, almost immediately a large portion of the appointees turned down the job offers; at least 19 MPs are said to have rejected the appointment. Many of those who turned down positions were members of FORD–Kenya and the NPK, who constituted the political backbone of Kibaki's regime. Both FORD–Kenya and the NPK formally withdrew their support for the Government, resulting in the rejection of the high-level posts by their MPs. Many cited a failure on Kibaki's part to consult with other parties in the coalition regarding the make-up of the new cabinet as the principal cause for the rejections.

On 9 December 2005, Kibaki swore in the new cabinet, made up almost exclusively of his closest political allies.

== See also ==
- Constitutional Reforms in Kenya
- 2010 Kenyan constitutional referendum
