= Constitution of Kenya =

Supreme law of the Republic of Kenya

Overview
- Jurisdiction: Kenya
- Ratified: 4 August 2010
- Date effective: 27 August 2010
- System: Unitary presidential republic

Government structure
- Branches: Three (Executive, Legislature and Judiciary)
- Chambers: Bicameral (Parliament)
- Executive: President
- Judiciary: Supreme Court

History
- Amendments: 0
- Last amended: 4 July 2019
- Author: Committee of Experts
- Supersedes: Constitution of Kenya Act, 1969

Full text
- Constitution of Kenya (2010) at Wikisource

The Constitution of Kenya is the supreme law of the Republic of Kenya. There have been three significant versions of Kenya's constitution, with the most recent being the one promulgated in 2010. The constitution was presented to the Attorney General of Kenya on 7 April 2010, officially published on 6 May 2010, and was subjected to a referendum on 4 August 2010. The new Constitution was approved by 67% of Kenyan voters. The constitution was promulgated on 27 August 2010, marking an historic chapter in Kenya's governance.

The 2010 new constitution of Kenya enshrined power to the citizens of Kenya and fundamentally reshaped the country's governance landscape in several ways included the introduction of a devolved system of governance, Checks on Executive Power, Expanded Bill of Rights and Judicial Independence.

== Constitutional reforms ==
Constitutional reforms involving wholly new texts since gaining independence: in 1969 and in 2010. In 1969, the 1963 independence constitution was replaced with a new text that entrenched amendments already made to the system of government that the independence constitution had contemplated.

These changes included: changing the structure of the state from a federal, or Majimbo system, to a unitary system; creating a unicameral instead of bicameral legislature; changing from a parliamentary to a presidential system with a powerful presidency; and reducing the protections of the bill of rights. Further amendments to the 1969 constitution were later effected, including, in 1982, the institution of a de jure single party government.

The demand for a new constitution to replace the 1969 text with a more democratic system began in the early 1990s, with the end of the Cold War and democratic changes taking place elsewhere in Africa. The single party system was ended in 1991, and the first presidential election took place in 1992. Calls for a comprehensive review of the 1969 Constitution intensified in the late 1990s and early 2000s, helped by the victory of the opposition National Rainbow Coalition (NARC) party in the 2002 general elections. Official and civil society consultation processes led to the adoption of what became known as the "Bomas draft" constitution (after the location of the conference that adopted it).

However, substantial amendments were nonetheless made to this draft prior to a referendum in 2005, resulting in a split in the then ruling coalition. The Liberal Democratic Party faction of the government, led by the Late Raila Odinga, and supported by KANU led a successful 'No' vote against the amended Bomas Draft (called the Wako draft after the alleged mastermind of the changes). The review of the Constitution stalled and negotiations over the adoption of a new text seemed deadlocked. A deadlock only finally broken by the intervention of the African Union through a mediation team headed by Kofi Annan, following the outbreak of serious post-election violence in early 2008.

== Drafting process for the 2010 Constitution ==
The Constitution of Kenya was the final document resulting from the revision of the Harmonized draft constitution of Kenya written by the Committee of Experts initially released to the public on 17 November 2009 so that the public could debate the document and then parliament could decide whether to subject it to a referendum in June 2010. The public was given 30 days to scrutinize the draft and forward proposals and amendments to their respective members of parliament, after which a revised draft was presented to the Parliamentary Committee on 8 January 2010. The Parliamentary Select Committee (PSC) revised the draft and returned the draft to the Committee of Experts who published a Proposed Constitution on 23 February 2010 that was presented to Parliament for final amendments if necessary.

After failing to incorporate over 150 amendments to the proposed constitution, parliament unanimously approved the proposed constitution on 1 April 2010. The proposed constitution was presented to the Attorney General of Kenya on 7 April 2010, officially published on 6 May 2010, and was subjected to a referendum on 4 August 2010. The new Constitution was approved by 67% of Kenyan voters.

== Government structure ==
The key changes proposed by the new constitution released are in the following areas:

- Separation of Powers between the three arms of government i.e., executive, legislature and judiciary.
- The executive – who holds executive authority and the qualifications.
- The legislature – the composition, and representation of the people. An introduction of an upper house – the Senate.
- The judiciary – qualifications to hold office and appointment.
- Devolution – only two levels of Government: National and Counties.
- Citizenship – among other issues, gender discrimination was ended, and citizens who acquire foreign citizenship will not lose their Kenyan citizenship.

Gains achieved

- An advanced Bill of Rights that among other things recognizes socio-economic rights of Kenyan citizens. (Chapter Four).
- The removal of age limit of 35 years to run for president. New draft allows people to run as long as they are of adult age. Article 137(b)
- Right to recall legislators (senators and members of the National Assembly). (Article 104)
- Representation in elective bodies has to effectively meet a gender equity constitutional requirement, namely that no more than two-thirds of members shall be from either gender in its make up. Chapter 7, Article 81(b)
- Integrity Chapter, requires an independent ethics commission to will monitor compliance with integrity in all government institutions and make investigations, recommendations to the necessary authorities i.e. Attorney General and any other relevant authority.(Chapter Six)
- An advanced Human Rights and Equality Commission that will also have power to investigate and summon people involved in Human Rights abuses within the government and with the public. (Article 252)
- Equitable sharing of resources between the national government and the county governments through a resolution of Parliament. Chapter 12- Part 4.
- An Equalization Fund to improve basic access to basic needs of the marginalized communities. (Article 204).
- Any member of the public has a right to bring up a case against the government on the basis of infringement of Human Rights and the Bill of Rights – Article 23(1)(2). The courts and government institutions are bound to the Bill of Rights as per the constitution Article 2(1), Article 10(1).
- The Salaries and Remuneration Commission, an independent entity which has the power of regularly reviewing salaries of all state officers to ensure the compensation bill is fiscally sustainable. Article 230(5).
- Independence of the judiciary is affirmed Article 160.
- An Independent National Land Commission created to maintain oversight and manage all public land belonging to National and County Government and recommend policy on addressing complaints from public, advise the National government on ways of improving National and County land management, planning, dispute resolution. Article 67.
- Environmental Rights are recognized under Chapter 5 (Part 2)
- Freedom of media establishment from penalty on expression, by the state on any opinion and dissemination of media. Article 34. This is subject to Article 33.

=== The executive ===
The executive at the top most levels will be constituted of a president, deputy president and the Cabinet.

==== Key functions of the president ====
The key functions of the President of Kenya are as follows:

- Shall be the head of state and head of government of the Republic of Kenya.
- Shall not be a member of parliament
- Commander-in-Chief – and will declare war and state emergency upon approval by the National Assembly and Cabinet respectively.
- Head of Government – will wield executive authority and will co-ordinate and supervise all major sections of the executive branch.
- Shall nominate, appoint with prior approval of the national assembly, and dismiss Cabinet Secretaries.
- Preside over Cabinet meetings.
- Shall assent bills into law or refer them back to parliament for further review.
- Shall nominate, and after approval of Parliament, appoint a Chief Justice.
- Shall nominate, and after approval of Parliament, appoint an Attorney General
- Shall nominate, and after approval of Parliament, appoint a Director of Public prosecution.
- Shall appoint Judges to the Superior Court recommended to him/her by an independent Judiciary Service Commission.
- Shall appoint Ambassadors/High Commissioners to Kenyan embassies abroad.

=== The legislature ===
The Legislative branch is multicameral and will constitute of the following.

==== An upper house – the Senate ====
- Each of the 47 counties will have a Senator
- A senator will be elected by the voters.
- Tentative total number of Senators will be 60.
- Presides over presidential impeachment hearings (article 145)

==== A lower house – the National Assembly ====
- Each constituency (290 the number gazetted by Independent Electoral and Boundaries Commission in October 2012).
- Majority of the Members of National Assembly will be directly elected by voters
- There will be a Women's Representative MP elected from each county – therefore guaranteeing a minimum of 47 women MPs in the National Assembly.
- Tentative total number of MPs will be 347.
- Votes to investigate and impeach the president (article 145)

==== County Assemblies and Executive ====
- The country will be divided to approximately 47 counties,
- Each county will have a County Executive headed by a county governor elected directly by the people and;
- A county assembly elected with representatives from wards within the county.

=== Judiciary ===
There will be three superior courts:

- Supreme Court – highest judiciary organ consisting of the Chief Justice, the Deputy Chief Justice and five other judges. This court will handle appeals from the Appeals and Constitutional courts. It will also preside over presidential impeachment proceedings.
- Court of Appeal – will handle appeal cases from the High Court and as prescribed by Parliament. It will constitute not less than 12 judges and will be headed by a president appointed by the chief justice.

An independent Judicial Service Commission has been set up to handle the appointment of judges. They will recommend a list of persons to be appointed as judges by the president (this article will be enforced after the transitional period). The commission will consist of the following:

- A Supreme Court judge – elected by members of the Supreme Court to chair the commission
- Court of Appeal judge – elected by members of the Court of Appeals to chair the commission
- The Attorney-General
- Two advocates, one a woman and one a man, each of whom has at least fifteen years' experience, nominated by the statutory body responsible for the professional regulation of advocates
- One person nominated by the Public Service Commission.

==== Attorney General ====
- Shall be appointed by the president – with approval from the National Assembly
- Hold office for only one term of not more than 8 years (article 157(5)).

== Devolution ==
Devolution to the county governments will only be autonomous in implementation of distinct functions as listed in the Fourth Schedule (Part 2). This is in contrast with the Federal System in which Sovereignty is Constitutionally divided between the Federal government and the States. The Kenyan Devolution system still maintains a Unitary Political Concept as a result of distribution of functions between the two levels of government under the Fourth schedule and also as result of Article 192 which gives the president the power to suspend a county government under certain conditions.

A conflict of laws between the two levels of government is dealt with under Article 191 where National legislation will in some cases override County legislation. The relationship between the National Government and the Counties can be seen as that of a Principal and a limited autonomy Agent as opposed to an Agent and Agent relation in the Federal System.

More checks and balances have been introduced as requirements for accountability of both levels of government. The Parliament (Senate and National Assembly) has much discretion on the budgetary allocations to the County Governments. Every Five years the Senate receives recommendations from the Commission of Revenue Allocation (Article 217) and a resolution is passed on the criteria for Revenue allocation.

The National Government is constitutionally barred from intruding wilfully with the county government role and function under the Fourth Schedule. Exceptions may require parliamentary approval (Article 191 and 192). The National Government has a role to play in the County level by performing all the other functions that are not assigned to the County Government as listed on the Fourth Schedule (Part 1).

== Citizenship ==
The new constitution makes important reforms to the previous framework on citizenship, in particular by ending gender discrimination in relation to the right of a woman to pass citizenship to her children or spouse; by ending the prohibition on dual citizenship; and by restricting the grounds on which citizenship may be taken away. The text has been criticised, however, for not providing sufficient protections against statelessness for children or adults.

- A person is a citizen by birth if on the day of the person's birth, whether or not the person is born in Kenya, either the mother or father of the person is a citizen (Art 14(1)).
- A person who has been married to a citizen for a period of at least seven years is entitled on application to be registered as a citizen (Art 15(1)).
- A person who has been lawfully resident in Kenya for a continuous period of at least seven years, and who satisfies the conditions prescribed by an Act of Parliament, may apply to be registered as a citizen (Art 15(2)).
- A person who is a citizen does not lose citizenship by reason only of acquiring the citizenship of another country (Art 16) and persons who are citizens of other countries may acquire Kenyan citizenship (Art 15(4)).
- A person who as a result of acquiring the citizenship of another country ceased to be a Kenyan citizen is entitled, on application, to regain Kenyan citizenship (Art 14(5)).

== Disagreements over reform ==
=== Initial reform efforts ===
After the draft of the constitution was released the type of government which would be implemented with the constitution was a debate amongst the various government coalitions. The two major political parties, the Party of National Unity and the Orange Democratic Movement disagreed on many points. the greatest discrepancy in opinion was over the nature of the executive branch of the government.

The economic interest represented by the Kenya Private Sector Alliance (KEPSA), openly opposed the new style of government. Eventually the contentious issue of the position of Prime Minister was removed. The remaining contentious issues primarily concern abortion, Kadhi courts and land reform.

=== Christian leaders' opposition ===
Mainstream Christian leaders in Kenya object to the constitution

1. The Proposed Constitution of Kenya in Sec 26(4) reiterates and reaffirms the current Kenyan penal code by stating: Abortion is not permitted unless, in the opinion of a trained health professional, there is need for emergency treatment, or the life or health of the mother is in danger, or if permitted by any other written law. However, the church insists that the weak drafting of the clause, especially the last two parts, could allow for the same clause to be used to enact laws or justify procurement of on-demand abortion.
1. The Proposed Constitution of Kenya in Sec 24(4) exempts a section of society that profess Islam as their religion from broad sections of the Bill of Rights that relate with Personal Status, Marriage, Divorce and Inheritance.
2. The Proposed Constitution of Kenya in Sec 170 Provides for the Establishment of Kadhi Courts.
3. The Proposed Constitution of Kenya in Sec 170 (2)a Discriminates against all other sectors of society by limiting the Kadhi's Job opportunity only to persons that Profess the Muslim Religion. The church leaders also insist that for the clarity of the separation of religion and state doctrine and equality of religion, the Kadhi courts should not be in the constitution.

=== High Court rejects Kadhi court ===
A three Judge Bench of the High Court has since, in a landmark ruling of a case filed six years ago, declared the inclusion of the Kadhi court illegal and against the principles of non-discrimination, separation of religion and state and constitutionalism.

A section of the Muslim leadership vowed to retaliate the ruling by seeking their own judicial declaration that the teaching of Christian religious Education in public school curriculum is illegal. The education curriculum includes religious education syllabus for both Christianity and Islam.

=== BBI ===
==== Proposal ====
Following the contentious 2017 presidential election (initially ruled illegal by the Supreme Court, which forced President-elect Kenyatta into a re-run), the two leading contenders—rivals Uhuru Kenyatta (who won election) and Raila Odinga—proposed a "Building Bridges Initiative" (BBI), which consisted of a number of proposed amendments to Kenya's constitution.

Promoted by Kenyatta and Odinga as a way to resolve factional tensions in the nation—improving inclusion and ending Kenya's winner-take-all elections (often followed by deadly violence)—the amendments sought to:

- expand the executive and legislative branches;
- add the post of prime minister;
- add two deputies
- add official leader of the opposition
- revert to selecting cabinet ministers from among the elected Members of Parliament,
- create at least 70 new constituencies; and
- add an affirmative action clause that would create the possibility of up to 300 unelected new members of Parliament—potentially creating a Parliament nearing the size of the United States Congress.

Critics alleged the effort was unnecessary, and was a selfish attempt to reward political dynasties, and weaken Deputy President William Ruto (Odinga's rival for the next presidency) — which would produce an over-sized government that debt-laden Kenya could not afford.

Kenyatta created a BBI constitutional committee to present the BBI as a popular initiative, allegedly started by ordinary citizens, as allowed by the Kenyan constitution. A BBI task force gathered five million signatures in support of the proposal.

The BBI was reportedly a matter of great political importance to both Kenyatta (who was due to leave office shortly thereafter) and Odinga (who was expected to run for the presidency), and reportedly bribes of up to $1,000 (£700) were given to some members of Parliament to secure support for the BBI. The issue dominated Kenyan politics from 2019 to 2021.

The BBI was passed by Kenya's National Assembly and Senate, and was awaiting President Kenyatta's approval when it was challenged in the Kenyan High Court.

==== High Court rejection ====
In May, 2021, the Kenyan High Court blocked the BBI plan, declaring it irregular, illegal and unconstitutional.

The court ruled that the Kenyatta was not eligible to undertake such an amendment process because he was not simply an ordinary citizen—the only people authorized by the constitution to undertake such an effort.

The court further chastised President Kenyatta, saying that his BBI constitutional committee was illegal, and the five million signatures it gathered were not proof that it was a true citizen-led initiative, saying:

"A popular initiative to amend the constitution can only be started by the people not by the government"

The court added that the president had failed to pass the leadership and integrity test—warning that he could be sued, personally, for his actions. The court's ruling established grounds for impeachment of the president—though the parliament, which passed the bill, was reported unlikely to challenge Kenyatta.

== International reaction ==
Generally the whole world praised the approach that the Kenyans took to constitutional reform, seeing it as a viable way to keep corruption in check. United States Secretary of State Hillary Clinton said that "I am pleased that they have taken this step, which represents a major milestone." Other United States diplomats also commented on the unity and meaningful intent which Kenyans were presenting in approaching the reform.

Non-profits concerned with civil society and other reforms also praised the approach. For example, the Africa director for the International Foundation for Electoral Systems said that "The fact that they are bringing in stakeholders to lend their voice and make recommendations will strengthen civil society because they will keep a close eye on the process and, if it is passed, will ensure that it is respected and properly implemented."

Canadian Foreign Affairs Minister Lawrence Cannon stated: "On behalf of the Government of Canada, I wish to congratulate Kenya on the adoption of its new constitution. This is a significant achievement and an important moment in Kenya's history. We welcome the leadership shown by President Mwai Kibaki and Prime Minister Raila Amolo Odinga within the Grand Coalition Government in bringing Kenyans together to tackle their future and make progress through dialogue, and in implementing the reforms set out in the country's National Accord and Reconciliation Act and should reaffirm its complete cooperation and commitment to the ICC.".

Researchers at the UK-based Overseas Development Institute have praised the 2010 Constitution as a positive step forwards in terms of securing greater equity for women and children in Kenya, highlighting "A new narrative for social justice" and "Institutional reforms to strengthen accountability". However, they stress that a constitution alone will not generate the desired changes; what matters is how the constitutional commitments are translated into policy and practice.

== See also ==
- Constitution of Kenya (1963)
- Constitutional Reforms in Kenya
- Kenyan constitutional referendum, 2005
- Kenyan constitutional referendum, 2010
