= 2010 Kenyan constitutional referendum =

- 4 August 2010
- Do you approve the proposed new Constitution?

Results
Choice	Votes	%
Yes	6,092,593	68.55%
No	2,795,059	31.45%
Valid votes	8,887,652	100.00%
Invalid or blank votes	218,633	2.46%
Total votes	8,887,652	100.00%
Registered voters/turnout	12,616,627	70.44%
- Results by province

A constitutional referendum was held in Kenya on 4 August 2010. Voters were asked whether they approved of a proposed new constitution, which had been passed by the National Assembly on 1 April 2010. The new constitution was seen as a vital step to avoid a repetition of the violent outbursts after the 2007 general elections.

The result was a victory for the "Yes" campaign, with 68.6% of voters approving the constitution. The "No" campaign's main spokesman, Higher Education Minister William Ruto, conceded defeat. The new constitution came into force on 27 August.

== Background ==
The 1963 constitution was replaced by a new constitution in 1969. This was amended on several occasions, including a 1982 amendment that led to a coup attempt. The amendment saw the addition of a section 2A to the constitution, making Kenya a single-party state under President Daniel arap Moi. Following protests in the late 1980s, section 2A was repealed in 1991, establishing the multi-party state, and the constitution had existed unmodified since then. Although this was seen as a step forward, the country retained a reputation for corruption and many Kenyans desired a completely revised document. This came a step closer to reality in 1998 when a law was passed in parliament calling for a review of the constitution. However, little was done to effect this during the remaining years of Moi's administration.

In the run-up to his victory in the 2002 general elections, President Mwai Kibaki made constitutional reform and the anti-corruption drive a key priority. Despite promises to conduct a review early in the parliament, the new government continued to drag its feet. This was due mainly to the presence of senior officials from the previous regime, whose defection had been vital to Kibaki's election success, but who were ultimately unwilling to risk upsetting the status quo. Eventually, in 2004, a proposed new constitution known as the Bomas draft was released. This proposed wide-reaching changes to the structure of government, including the transfer of some powers from the President to a newly created post of Prime Minister, representing a change to a semi-presidential republic. Fearing the loss of power, senior government figures watered down the Bomas draft, leading to widespread opposition, civil unrest and the resignation of several senior members of Kibaki's coalition. The revised document was presented to the people in the November 2005 constitutional referendum, and was defeated.

Following the referendum, politicians that had campaigned against the draft united to form a new party in opposition, known as the Orange Democratic Movement, after the symbol of an orange, which had been present on the referendum ballot papers to signify a "no" vote. Despite splits, the party appeared to be in a strong position going into the 2007 presidential election, but was ultimately defeated in controversial circumstances, leading to the violence of the 2007–2008 Kenyan crisis. The peace deal that ended the crisis mandated that the constitutional question be revisited, which led in November 2009 to a new draft. After minor modifications and the passage of the draft through parliament, the referendum date was set for 4 August 2010.

== Question ==
The referendum question was announced on 13 May 2010:

Do you approve the proposed new Constitution?
Swahili: Je, unaikubali katiba mpya inayopendekezwa?

Voter's choices in response to this question were "Yes" or "No". To reduce confusion and make it easier for understanding, the law required that each response was accompanied by a visual symbol to ensure voters were aware of which choice they were making. The symbols chosen for this referendum were colours: green for "Yes" and red for "No".

To be passed, the referendum required a simple majority overall and at least 25% of votes in five of Kenya's eight provinces.

== Campaign ==
Most senior figures in the coalition government were supporters of the "Yes" campaign, including President Mwai Kibaki, Prime Minister Raila Odinga, Vice-president Kalonzo Musyoka and both deputy Prime Ministers, Musalia Mudavadi and Uhuru Kenyatta. The notable exceptions to this were Minister for Higher Education, William Ruto and Minister for Information, Samuel Poghisio, who led the "No" campaign along with former president Daniel arap Moi. These politicians felt the new law would not be good for Kenyans, arguing that the President would still retain excessive powers and that the provisions on land ownership were anti-capitalist.

The other major source of opposition to the constitution came from the Christian churches, who feared it would lead to the legalisation of abortion, due to a clause permitting abortion for maternal health reasons. The other clause considered contentious by the church was the inclusion of Kadhi courts for settling some civil issues relating to Muslim citizens. Although these courts have been present since pre-colonial times, they were not previously enshrined in the Constitution.

== Conduct ==
The run-up to the referendum was largely peaceful, although there were isolated incidents of violence, such as when six people were killed and many more injured in June 2010, in a bomb attack on a rally for the "No" campaign in Nairobi. The Uchaguzi organisation was established to monitor the referendum.

The vote took place amid tight security to avoid a repeat of the previous elections' aftermath. There were particular worries in the Rift Valley Province, where tensions between Kalenjin and Kikuyu populations had caused the worst of the 2007 violence. The vote eventually passed off peacefully, with no reports of violence.

== Opinion polls ==
Opinion polls taken between April and July 2010 showed a consistent lead for the "Yes" campaign, with support ranging between 49% and 64%, compared to a range of 17% — 22% for the "No" campaign.

Date	For	Against	Undecided
24 April 2010	64%	17%	19%
29 May 2010	63%	21%	16%
4 June 2010	57%	20%	19%
7 July 2010	49%	22%	22%
16 July 2010	62%	20%	18%
23 July 2010	58%	22%	17%

== Results ==
Results by Province: 1. Central; 2. Coast; 3. Eastern; 4. Nairobi / 5. North Eastern; 6. Nyanza; 7. Rift Valley; 8. Western

The result was a victory for the "Yes" campaign, with 69% in favour and 31% against on a turnout of 72.2%. Most areas of the country voted in favour of the Constitution, with the notable exception of the Rift Valley Province, where the majority of voters followed the advice of local leaders William Ruto and Daniel arap Moi in voting against. The only area that failed to vote overwhelmingly as predicted was the Ukambani area of the lower Eastern Province, where the "Yes" camp recorded only a very narrow victory despite support from local leaders Kalonzo Musyoka and Charity Ngilu.

Choice	Votes	%
For	6,092,593	68.55
Against	2,795,059	31.45
Total	8,887,652	100.00
Valid votes	8,887,652	97.60
Invalid/blank votes	218,633	2.40
Total votes	9,106,285	100.00
Registered voters/turnout	12,616,627	72.18
Source: African Elections Database

=== By province ===
Province	For		Against		Invalid/ blank	Total	Registered voters	Turnout
Province	Votes	%	Votes	%	Invalid/ blank	Total	Registered voters	Turnout
Central	1,274,967	84.4	235,588	15.6	29,692	1,540,247	1,958,898	78.6
Coast	425,626	79.24	111,532	20.76	16,388	553,546	997,086	55.5
Eastern	741,109	56.43	572,109	43.57	32,480	1,345,698	2,028,444	66.3
Nairobi	678,621	76.52	208,195	23.48	29,298	916,114	1,292,229	70.9
North Eastern	110,992	95.71	4,970	4.29	599	116,561	231,928	50.3
Nyanza	1,174,033	92.04	101,491	7.96	20,257	1,295,781	1,705,292	76.0
Rift Valley	971,331	40.52	1,426,102	59.48	65,447	2,462,880	3,046,294	80.8
Western	715,914	84.13	135,072	15.87	24,472	875,458	1,356,456	64.5
Total	6,092,593	68.55	2,795,059	31.45	218,633	9,106,285	12,616,627	72.2
Source: African Elections Database

== Reactions ==
The result was generally welcomed by the international community, with messages of congratulations to the government and people of Kenya from, amongst others, US President Barack Obama, former UN Secretary General Kofi Annan and the leaders of other African Great Lakes nations.

== Aftermath ==
As required by the law mandating the referendum, the new Constitution was formally promulgated in a ceremony on 27 August 2010 by President Kibaki. This historic occasion was attended by foreign leaders and dignitaries from Africa and all over the world.
