= List of members of the Senate of Kenya, 2013–2017 =

Senate elections were held in Kenya on 4 March 2013 as part of the general elections. Under the new constitution, which was passed in a 2010 referendum, the 2013 elections were the first run by the Independent Electoral and Boundaries Commission (IEBC). The constitution re-established the Senate, previously disbanded in 1966. The new body was to have 47 elected members (one for each county) and 20 nominated members (16 women appointed on the basis of elected seat distribution, two representing youth and two representing people with disabilities). The Speaker of the Senate, who is an ex-officio member, was elected by the Senators during the first sitting of the Senate.

== Results summary ==
| Coalition | Party | Elected | Nominated | Total |
|---|---|---|---|---|
| Jubilee Alliance | The National Alliance | 11 | 6 | 17 |
| Jubilee Alliance | United Republican Party | 9 | 3 | 12 |
| Jubilee Alliance | National Rainbow Coalition | 1 | – | 1 |
| Jubilee Alliance | Total | 21 | 9 | 30 |
| CORD | Orange Democratic Movement | 11 | 6 | 17 |
| CORD | FORD–Kenya | 4 | 1 | 5 |
| CORD | Wiper Democratic Movement – Kenya | 4 | 1 | 5 |
| CORD | Federal Party of Kenya | 1 | – | 1 |
| CORD | Total | 20 | 8 | 28 |
| Amani | Kenya African National Union | 2 | 1 | 3 |
| Amani | United Democratic Forum Party | 2 | 1 | 3 |
| Amani | Total | 4 | 2 | 6 |
| Unaffiliated | Alliance Party of Kenya | 2 | 1 | 3 |
| Unaffiliated | Total | 2 | 1 | 3 |
| Total | | 47 | 20 | 67 |

== Members ==
=== Elected ===
| County No | County | Name | Party |
|---|---|---|---|
| 1 | Mombasa | Hassan Omar | Wiper Democratic Movement – Kenya |
| 2 | Kwale | Boy Juma Boy | Orange Democratic Movement |
| 3 | Kilifi | Stewart Madzayo | Orange Democratic Movement |
| 4 | Tana River | Ali Bule | Federal Party of Kenya |
| 5 | Lamu | Abu Chiaba | The National Alliance |
| 6 | Taita-Taveta | Dan Mwazo | Orange Democratic Movement |
| 7 | Garissa | Yusuf Haji | The National Alliance |
| 8 | Wajir | Abdirahman Ali | Orange Democratic Movement |
| 9 | Mandera | Billow Kerow | United Republican Party |
| 10 | Marsabit | Godana Hargura | Orange Democratic Movement |
| 11 | Isiolo | Mohammed Kuti | United Republican Party |
| 12 | Meru | Mithika Linturi | Alliance Party of Kenya |
| 13 | Tharaka | Kithure Kindiki | The National Alliance |
| 14 | Embu | Lenny Kivuti | Alliance Party of Kenya |
| 15 | Kitui | David Musila | Wiper Democratic Movement – Kenya |
| 16 | Machakos | Johnstone Muthama | Wiper Democratic Movement – Kenya |
| 17 | Makueni | Mutula Kilonzo | Wiper Democratic Movement – Kenya |
| 18 | Nyandarua | Muriuki Karue | The National Alliance |
| 19 | Nyeri | Mutahi Kagwe | National Rainbow Coalition |
| 20 | Kirinyaga | Daniel Karaba | The National Alliance |
| 21 | Murang'a | Kembi Gitura | The National Alliance |
| 22 | Kiambu | Paul Kimani | The National Alliance |
| 23 | Turkana | John Munyes | FORD–Kenya |
| 24 | West Pokot | John Lonyangapuo | Kenya African National Union |
| 25 | Samburu | Sammy Leshore | United Republican Party |
| 26 | Trans-Nzoia | Henry Ndiema | FORD–Kenya |
| 27 | Uasin Gishu | Isaac Melly | United Republican Party |
| 28 | Elgeyo-Marakwet | Kipchumba Murkomen | United Republican Party |
| 29 | Nandi | Stephen Sang | United Republican Party |
| 30 | Baringo | Gideon Moi | Kenya African National Union |
| 31 | Laikipia | Godffrey Gitahi Kariuki | The National Alliance |
| 32 | Nakuru | James Kiarie Mungai | The National Alliance |
| 33 | Narok | Stephen Kanyinge ole Ntutu | United Republican Party |
| 34 | Kajiado | Peter Mositet | The National Alliance |
| 35 | Kericho | Charles Keter | United Republican Party |
| 36 | Bomet | Wilson Lessan | United Republican Party |
| 37 | Kakamega | Bonny Khalwale | United Democratic Forum Party |
| 38 | Vihiga | George Khaniri | United Democratic Forum Party |
| 39 | Bungoma | Moses Wetangula | FORD–Kenya |
| 40 | Busia | Amos Wako | Orange Democratic Movement |
| 41 | Siaya | James Orengo | Orange Democratic Movement |
| 42 | Kisumu | Peter Anyang' Nyong'o | Orange Democratic Movement |
| 43 | Homa Bay | Otieno Kajwang | Orange Democratic Movement |
| 44 | Migori | Wilfred Machage | Orange Democratic Movement |
| 45 | Kisii | Chris Obure | Orange Democratic Movement |
| 46 | Nyamira | Kennedy Mong'are Okong'o | FORD–Kenya |
| 47 | Nairobi | Gideon Mbuvi | The National Alliance |

=== Nominated ===
==== Women ====
| # | Name | Party |
|---|---|---|
| 1 | Beatrice Elachi | Alliance Party of Kenya |
| 2 | Catherine Mukite Nabwola | FORD–Kenya |
| 3 | Janet Ongera | Orange Democratic Movement |
| 4 | Elizabeth Ongoro Masha | Orange Democratic Movement |
| 5 | Halima Abdille Mohamud | Orange Democratic Movement |
| 6 | Agnes Zani (Dr.) | Orange Democratic Movement |
| 7 | Beth Wambui Mugo | The National Alliance |
| 8 | Emma Mbura Gertrude | The National Alliance |
| 9 | Naisula Lesuuda | The National Alliance |
| 10 | Joy Adhiambo Gwendo | The National Alliance |
| 11 | Martha Wangari | United Democratic Forum Party |
| 12 | Mshenga Mvita Kisasa | United Republican Party |
| 13 | Chelule Liza | United Republican Party |
| 14 | Dullo Fatuma Adam | United Republican Party |
| 15 | Judith Achieng Sijeny | Wiper Democratic Movement – Kenya |
| 16 | Zipporah Jepchirchir Kittony | Kenya African National Union |

==== Youth ====
| # | Name | Party |
|---|---|---|
| 1 | Kanainza Nyongesa Daisy | Orange Democratic Movement |
| 2 | Hosea Onchwangi | The National Alliance |

==== Persons with disabilities ====
| # | Name | Party |
|---|---|---|
| 1 | Linet Kemunto Nyakeriga | The National Alliance |
| 2 | Harold Kimunge Kipchumba | Orange Democratic Movement |

== Changes during term ==
=== Nominated members ===
| Date | Previous Senator | Party | Reason for replacement | New Senator | Party |
|---|---|---|---|---|---|
| 15 October 2013 | Linet Kemunto Nyakeriga | The National Alliance | Nomination nullified by High Court | Ben Njoroge | The National Alliance |
| 15 October 2013 | Harold Kimunge Kipchumba | Orange Democratic Movement | Nomination nullified by High Court | Godliver Nanjira Omondi | Orange Democratic Movement |

=== By-elections ===
| Constituency | Date | Previous Senator | Party | Reason for by-election | New Senator | Party |
|---|---|---|---|---|---|---|
| Makueni | 26 July 2013 | Mutula Kilonzo | Wiper Democratic Movement – Kenya | Kilonzo died on 27 April 2013 | Mutula Kilonzo, Jr. | Wiper Democratic Movement – Kenya |
| Bungoma | 19 December 2013 | Moses Wetangula | FORD – Kenya | Result annulled | Moses Wetangula | FORD – Kenya |
