= Senate of Kenya =

Upper house of the Parliament of Kenya

Coordinates: 1.2899°S 36.8200°E

The Senate of the Republic of Kenya Bunge la Seneti la Kenya
- 13th Parliament

Type
- Type: Upper house of the Parliament of Kenya
- Term limits: None

History
- Founded: 1963 (original) 2013 (reconstruction)
- Disbanded: 1966
- New session started: 8 September 2022

Leadership
- Speaker: Amason Kingi, Kenya Kwanza since 8 September 2022
- Deputy Speaker: Kathuri Murungi, Kenya Kwanza since 8 September 2022
- Majority Leader: Aaron Cheruiyot, Kenya Kwanza since 17 September 2022
- Minority Leader: Stewart Madzayo, Azimio-One Kenya since 17 September 2022
- Majority Whip: Bonny Khalwale, Kenya Kwanza since 17 September 2022
- Minority Whip: Olekina Ledama, Azimio-One Kenya since 17 September 2022

Structure
- Seats: 67
- Political groups: Government (66): Kenya Kwanza (33); Azimio la Umoja (33); Vacant (1): Vacant (1)

Elections
- Voting system: 47 First Past the Post, 20 co-opted, 1 ex-officio
- First election: 18–26 May 1963 (original) 4 March 2013 (reconstruction)
- Last election: 9 August 2022
- Next election: No later than 10 August 2027

Meeting place
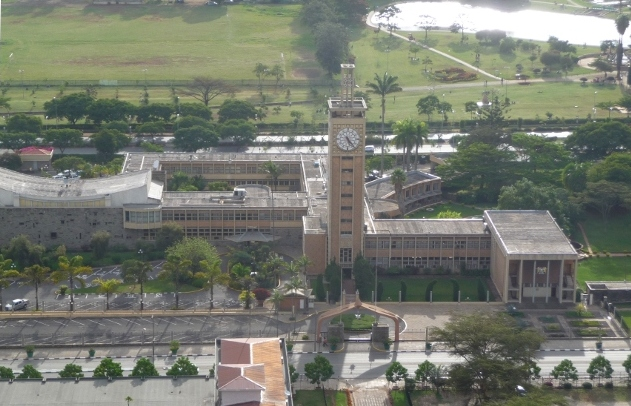
- Parliament Buildings, Nairobi, Kenya

Website
- Official website

The Senate of the Republic of Kenya (swahili: Seneti ya Jamhuri ya Kenya) is one of the two Houses of the Parliament of Kenya, along with the National Assembly. The Senate was first established as part of Kenya's 1963 Constitution.

After being abolished in 1966, the Senate was re-established by Article 93 of the new 2010 Constitution to represent counties' interests as well as pass legislation concerning counties.

== Powers ==
The powers and role of the Senate in Kenya are as follows:

- Empowered to represent the interests of the counties and their governments
- Participates in law-making by considering, debating and approving bills concerning counties
- Determines allocation of national revenue among counties.
- Has powers of impeachment over the president, deputy president, county governor, and deputy governors

== First Senate, 1963–1966 ==
Kenya's 1963 Constitution established a Senate that consisted of 41 senators elected for six years, with one-third of the members retiring every two years. Timothy Chokwe served as the first speaker of the Senate. The Senate was abolished in 1966, when its membership was combined with that of the House of Representatives to form a unicameral legislature, the National Assembly.

=== Members of the first Senate (1963–1966) ===
	Constituency	Senator	Party
1	Mombasa District	S. R. D. Msechu	
2	Kwale District	Rocky Mchinga	
3	Kilifi District	H. J. Malingi	
4	Tana River District	Martin T. Jilo	
5	Lamu District	Msallam M. Ali	
6	Taita-Taveta District	W. K. Mengo	
7	Garissa District	Abdi Haji Ahmed	
8	Wajir District	Noor Adhan Hassan	
9	Mandera District	Mohamed Nur Hussein	
10	Marsabit District	S. A. Galgallo	
11	Isiolo District	Mkubito Lawi	
12	Meru District	Julius Muthamia	
13	Embu District	S. R. Nyaga	
14	Kitui District	Permenas Nzilu Munyasia	
15	Machakos District	J. M. Nthula	
16	Nyandarua District	Gideon G. Kago	
17	Nyeri District	James P. Mathenge	
18	Kirinyaga District	Ndegwa Njiru	
19	Fort Hall District	Tadeo Mwaura	
20	Kiambu District	J. M. Koinange	
21	Thika District	J. M. Njonjo	
22	Turkana District	J. H. Robaro	
23	West Pokot District	E. Porriot Kassachon	
24	Samburu District	J. Lenayiarra Kanite	KADU
25	Trans-Nzoia District	William Wamalwa	
26	Uasin Gishu District	E. M. Daliti	
27	Elgeyo-Marakwet District	J. K. Arap Chemjor	
28	Nandi District	G. N. Kalya	
29	Baringo District	William Kiptui Rotich	
30	Laikipia District	Tom Kariuki Gichohi	
31	Nakuru District	W. Sijeyo	
32	Narok District	P. T. Ole Lemein	
33	Kajiado District	G. K. Ole Kipury	
34	Kericho District	James K Arap Soi	
35	Kakamega District	A. R. Tsalwa	
36	Bungoma District	Nathan W. Munoko	
37	Busia District	. J. W. Machio	
42	Central Nyanza District	D. O. Makasembo	
39	South Nyanza District	S. F. Mbeo-Onyango	
40	Kisii District	J. K. Kebaso	
41	Nairobi Extra-Regional Area	C. K. Lubembe	KANU

== Modern Senate, 2013–present ==
The 2013 General Election took place on 4 March 2013. Under the new Constitution, which was passed during the 2010 Referendum, the 2013 general election was the first to include the election of Senators representing the 47 newly created counties. They were also the first general elections run by the Independent Electoral and Boundaries Commission.

According to their share of elected seats, the political parties nominated an additional 16 women. Additional nominations were made for two members representing the youth and two members representing Persons Living with Disabilities (PLWD). The Speaker of the Senate, who is an ex officio member, is elected by the Senators sworn in on the first Sitting of the Senate.

== Members of the Senate from 2017 to 2022 ==
=== Elected senators ===
County number	County	Senator	Party	Coalition
1	Mombasa	Mohamed Faki Mwinyihaji	ODM	NASA
2	Kwale	Boy Issa Juma	ODM	NASA
3	Kilifi	Stewart Madzayo	ODM	NASA
4	Tana-River	Golich Juma Wario	JP	Jubilee
5	Lamu	Anuar Loitiptip	JP	Jubilee
6	Taita-Taveta	Johnes Mwashushe Mwaruma	ODM	NASA
7	Garissa	Abdulkadir Haji	JP	Jubilee
8	Wajir	Abdullahi Ibrahim Ali	JP	Jubilee
9	Mandera	Mohamed Maalim Mahamud	JP	Jubilee
10	Marsabit	Godana Hargura	JP	Jubilee
11	Isiolo	Adan Dullo Fatuma	PDR	Jubilee
12	Meru	Mithika Linturi	JP	Jubilee
13	Tharaka Nithi	Kithure A. Kindiki	JP	Jubilee
14	Embu	Peter Ndwiga	JP	Jubilee
15	Kitui	Enoch Kiio Wambua	WDM-K	NASA
16	Machakos	Boniface Mutinda Kabaka	WDM-K	NASA
17	Makueni	Mutula Kilonzo, Jr.	WDM-K	NASA
18	Nyandarua	Paul Githiomi Mwangi	JP	Jubilee
19	Nyeri	Ephraim Maina	JP	Jubilee
20	Kirinyaga	Charles Kibiru	JP	Jubilee
21	Murang'a	Irungu Kang'ata	JP	Jubilee
22	Kiambu	Kimani Wamatangi	JP	Jubilee
23	Turkana	Malachy Charles Ekal Imana	ODM	NASA
24	West-Pokot	Samuel Poghisio	KANU	Jubilee
25	Samburu	Steve Ltumbesi Lelegwe	JP	Jubilee
26	Trans-Nzoia	Michael Maling’a Mbito	JP	Jubilee
27	Uasin-Gishu	Margaret Kamar	JP	Jubilee
28	Elgeyo-Marakwet	Kipchumba Murkomen	JP	Jubilee
29	Nandi	Samson Cherarkey	JP	Jubilee
30	Baringo	Gideon Moi	KANU	Jubilee
31	Laikipia	John Nderitu	JP	Jubilee
32	Nakuru	Susan Kihika	JP	Jubilee
33	Narok	Olekina Ledama	ODM	NASA
34	Kajiado	Phillip Salau Mpaayei	JP	Jubilee
35	Kericho	Aaron Cheruiyot	JP	Jubilee
36	Bomet	Christopher Langat	JP	Jubilee
37	Kakamega	Cleophas Malala	ANC	NASA
38	Vihiga	George Khaniri	ANC	NASA
39	Bungoma	Moses Wetangula	FORD-KENYA	NASA
40	Busia	Amos Wako	ODM	NASA
41	Siaya	James Orengo	ODM	NASA
42	Kisumu	Frederick Outa Otieno	ODM	NASA
43	Homa Bay	Moses Otieno Kajwang	ODM	NASA
44	Migori	Ochilo Ayacko	ODM	NASA
45	Kisii	Sam Ongeri	UDA	NASA
46	Nyamira	Kennedy Mong'are Okong'o	ODM	NASA
47	Nairobi	Sakaja Johnson	JP	Jubilee
48	Kisii	Millicent Omanga	JP	Jubilee

Source: Kenyan Parliament (2020)

== Members of the Senate from 2022 to 2027 ==
=== Elected senators ===
County number	County	Senator	Party	Coalition
1	Mombasa	Mohamed Faki Mwinyihaji	ODM	Azimio-One Kenya
2	Kwale	Boy Issa Juma	ODM	Azimio-One Kenya
3	Kilifi	Stewart Madzayo	ODM	Azimio-One Kenya
4	Tana-River	Danson Mungatana	UDA	Kenya Kwanza
5	Lamu	Joseph Githuku	JP	Azimio-One Kenya
6	Taita-Taveta	Johnes Mwashushe Mwarume	ODM	Azimio-One Kenya
7	Garissa	Abdulkadir Haji	JP	Azimio-One Kenya
8	Wajir	Abass Mohamed	UDM	Kenya Kwanza
9	Mandera	Ali Roba	UDM	Kenya Kwanza
10	Marsabit	Mohamed Said Chute	UDA	Kenya Kwanza
11	Isiolo	Adan Dullo Fatuma	JP	Azimio-One Kenya
12	Meru	Kathuri Murungi	UDA	Kenya Kwanza
13	Tharaka Nithi	Gataya Mwenda	UDA	Kenya Kwanza
14	Embu	Alexander Mundigi	DP	Kenya Kwanza
15	Kitui	Enoch Kiio Wambua	WDM-K	Azimio-One Kenya
16	Machakos	Agnes Kavindu Muthama	WDM-K	Azimio-One Kenya
17	Makueni	Dan Maanzo	WDM-K	Azimio-One Kenya
18	Nyandarua	John Penninah Methu	UDA	Kenya Kwanza
19	Nyeri	Wahome Wamatinga	UDA	Kenya Kwanza
20	Kirinyaga	James Murango	UDA	Kenya Kwanza
21	Murang'a	Joe Nyutu	UDA	kenya Kwanza
22	Kiambu	Paul Karungo Thang'wa	UDA	Kenya Kwanza
23	Turkana	James Lomenen Ekomwa	UDA	Kenya Kwanza
24	West-Pokot	James Murgor	UDA	Kenya Kwanza
25	Samburu	Steve Ltumbesi Lelegwe	UDA	Kenya Kwanza
26	Trans-Nzoia	Allan Chesang	UDA	Kenya Kwanza
27	Uasin-Gishu	Jackson Mandago	UDA	Kenya Kwanza
28	Elgeyo-Marakwet	William Kisang	UDA	Kenya Kwanza
29	Nandi	Samson Cherarkey	UDA	Kenya Kwanza
30	Baringo	William Cheptumo	UDA	Kenya Kwanza
31	Laikipia	John Nderitu	UDA	Kenya Kwanza
32	Nakuru	Tabitha Keroche	UDA	Kenya Kwanza
33	Narok	Olekina Ledama	ODM	Azimio-One Kenya
34	Kajiado	Samuel Kanar Seki	UDA	Kenya Kwanza
35	Kericho	Aaron Cheruiyot	UDA	Kenya Kwanza
36	Bomet	Hillary Sigei	UDA	Kenya Kwanza
37	Kakamega	Bonny Khalwale	UDA	Kenya Kwanza
38	Vihiga	Geoffrey Osotsi	ODM	Azimio-One Kenya
39	Bungoma	David Wakoli Wafula	FORD-KENYA	Kenya Kwanza
40	Busia	Okiya Omtatah	NRA	Azimio-One Kenya
41	Siaya	Oburu Odinga	ODM	Azimio-One Kenya
42	Kisumu	Tom Ojienda	ODM	Azimio-One Kenya
43	Homa Bay	Moses Otieno Kajwang	ODM	Azimio-One Kenya
44	Migori	Eddy Oketch	ODM	Azimio-One Kenya
45	Kisii	Richard Onyonka	ODM	Azimio-One Kenya
46	Nyamira	Kennedy Mong'are Okong'o	ODM	Azimio-One Kenya
47	Nairobi	Edwin Sifuna	ODM	Azimio-One Kenya

== Members of the senate between 2013 and 2017 ==
The Senate consists of 47 members directly elected by their counties, 16 women nominated by the political parties according to their relative strength in the Senate elections, two members to represent the youth, and two members to represent persons with disabilities.

=== Elected senators ===
County number	County	Senator	Party	Coalition
1	Mombasa	Hassan Omar	WDM-K	CORD
2	Kwale	Issa Juma Boy	ODM	CORD
3	Kilifi	Stewart Madzayo	ODM	CORD
4	Tana-River	Ali bule	FPK	CORD
5	Lamu	Abu Chiaba	TNA	Jubilee
6	Taita-Taveta	Dan Mwazo	ODM	CORD
7	Garissa	Yusuf Haji	TNA	Jubilee
8	Wajir	Abdirahman Ali	ODM	CORD
9	Mandera	Billow Kerow	URP	Jubilee
10	Marsabit	Godana Hargura	ODM	CORD
11	Isiolo	Mohammed Kuti	URP	Jubilee
12	Meru	Kiraitu Murungi	APK	Jubilee
13	Tharaka Nithi	Kithure Kindiki	TNA	Jubilee
14	Embu	Lenny Kivuti	APK	Jubilee
15	Kitui	David Musila	WDM-K	CORD
16	Machakos	Johnstone Muthama	WDM-K	CORD
17	Makueni	Mutula Kilonzo, Jr.	WDM-K	CORD
18	Nyandarua	Muriuki Karue	TNA	Jubilee
19	Nyeri	Mutahi Kagwe	NARC	Jubilee
20	Kirinyaga	Daniel Karaba	TNA	Jubilee
21	Murang'a	Kembi Gitura	TNA	Jubilee
22	Kiambu	Paul Kimani	TNA	Jubilee
23	Turkana	John Munyes	FORD-KENYA	CORD
24	West-Pokot	John Krop Lonyangapuo	KANU	Jubilee
25	Samburu	Sammy Leshore	URP	Jubilee
26	Trans-Nzoia	Henry Ndiema	FORD-KENYA	CORD
27	Uasin-Gishu	Isaac Melly	URP	Jubilee
28	Elgeyo-Marakwet	Kipchumba Murkomen	URP	Jubilee
29	Nandi	Stephen Sang	URP	Jubilee
30	Baringo	Gideon Moi	KANU	Amani
31	Laikipia	Geoffrey Gitahi Kariuki	TNA	Jubilee
32	Nakuru	James Kiarie Mungai	TNA	Jubilee
33	Narok	Stephen Kanyinge ole Ntutu	URP	Jubilee
34	Kajiado	Peter Mositet	TNA	Jubilee
35	Kericho	Charles Keter	URP	Jubilee
36	Bomet	Wilson Lessan	URP	Jubilee
37	Kakamega	Bonny Khalwale	UDF	Amani
38	Vihiga	George Khaniri	UDF	Amani
39	Bungoma	Moses Wetangula	FORD-KENYA	CORD
40	Busia	Amos Wako	ODM	CORD
41	Siaya	James Orengo	ODM	CORD
42	Kisumu	Peter Anyang' Nyong'o	ODM	CORD
43	Homa Bay	Moses Kajwang	ODM	CORD
44	Migori	Wilfred Machage	ODM	CORD
45	Kisii	Chris Obure	ODM	CORD
46	Nyamira	Kennedy Mong'are Okong'o	FORD-KENYA	CORD
47	Nairobi	Gideon Mbuvi	TNA	Jubilee

== Women senators ==
Women Nominated to the senate 2022-2027

	Name	Political Party
1.	Abdalla Shakilla Mohamed	WDM
2.	Beatrice Akinyi Ogolla	ODM
3.	Beth Kalunda Syengo	ODM
4.	Betty Batuli Montet	ODM
5.	Catherine Muyeka Mumma	ODM
6.	Crystal Kegehi Asige	ODM
7.	Esther Anyieni Okenyuri	UDA
8.	Hamida Ali Kibwana	ODM
9.	Hezena M. Lemaletian	ODM
10.	Joyce Chepkoech Korir	UDA
11.	Miraj Abdillahi Abdulrahman	UDA
12.	Tabitha Maureen Mutinda	UDA
13.	Karen Nyamu	UDA
14.	Omar Mariam Sheikh	UDM
15.	Pesi Peris Tobiko	UDA
16.	Prof. Margaret Jepkoech Kamar	JP
17.	Veronica Waheti Nduati	UDA

=== Women nominated to the senate between 2013-2017 ===
#	Senator	Party
1	Beatrice Elachi	APK
2	Catherine Mukite Nobwola	FORD-KENYA
3	Janet Ongera	ODM
4	Elizabeth Ongoro Masha	ODM
5	Halima Abdille Mohamud	ODM
6	Agnes Nzani (Dr.)	ODM
7	Beth Wambui Mugo	TNA
8	Emma Mbura Getrude	TNA
9	Naisula Lesuuda	TNA
10	Joy Adhiambo Gwendo	TNA
11	Martha Wangari	UDF
12	Mshenga Mvita Kisasa	URP
13	Chelule Liza	URP
14	Adan Dullo Fatuma	URP
15	Judith Achieng Sijeny	WDM-K
16	Zipporah Jepchirchir Kittony	KANU
17	Naomi Masitsa Shiyonga	ODM

=== Members nominated to senate to represent youth ===
#	Name	Party
1	Kanainza Nyongesa Daisy	ODM
2	AMOS OLWAL	TNA

=== Members nominated to senate to represent people with disabilities ===
#	Name	Party
1	Ben Njoroge	TNA
2	Godliver Nanjira Omondi	ODM

=== Summary by coalition and party between 2013 and 2017 ===
These summaries are based on post-election coalitions as reported by the press.

Coalition	Party	Elected senators	Nominated senators	Total
Jubilee	TNA	11	6	17
Jubilee	URP	9	3	12
Jubilee	NARC	1	–	1
Jubilee	Total	21	9	30
Amani Jubilee-affiliated	KANU	2	1	3
Amani Jubilee-affiliated	UDF	2	1	3
Amani Jubilee-affiliated	Total	4	2	6
Jubilee-affiliated	APK	2	1	3
Jubilee-affiliated	Total	2	1	3
CORD	ODM	10	6	16
CORD	FORD-KENYA	4	1	5
CORD	WDM-K	4	1	5
CORD	FPK	1	–	1
CORD	Total	19	8	27
Vacant		1	0	1
Total		47	20	67

== Committees ==
Committees 2022–

- Senate committee on Health
  - Chairperson: Jackson Mandago
  - Vice Chair:Mariam Omar Sheikh
- Senate Budget and Finance committee
  - Chairperson: Ali Roba
  - Vice Chair: Tabitha Mutinda
- Senate Committee on Information, Communication and Technology
  - Chairperson: Allan Chesang
  - Vice Chair: Gloria Orwoba
- Senate Committee on Justice, Legal And Human Rights
  - Chairperson: Hillary Sigei
  - Vice Chair: Raphael Chimera
- Senate Committee on Labour and Social Welfare Committee
  - Chairperson: Julius Murgor
  - Vice Chair: John Mbugua
- Senate Committee on Agriculture, Livestock and Fisheries
  - Chairperson: James Murango
  - Vice Chair: Alexander Mundigi
- Senate Committee on Devolution and Intergovernmental Relations
  - Chairperson: Sheikh Mohamed Abass
  - Vice Chair: Rosalinda Tuya
- Senate Committee on Education
  - Chairperson: Joseph Nyutu
  - Vice Chair:Peris Tobiko
- Senate Committee on Energy
  - Chairperson: Wahome Wamatinga
  - Vice Chair:Veronicah Nduati

Committees 2013–2022

- Senate Rules and Business Committee
  - Chair: Ekwee Ethuro
- Senate Committee on Education, Information and Technology
  - Chair: Mutahi Kagwe (NARC)
  - Vice Chair: Mohamud Halima Abdille (ODM)
- Senate Committee on Energy, Roads and Transportation
  - Chair: Gideon Moi (KANU)
  - Vice Chair: Mwakulegwa Danson Mwazo (ODM)
- Senate Committee on Finance, Commerce and Economic Affairs
  - Chair: Billow Kerrow (URP)
  - Vice Chair: Peter Mositet (TNA)
- Senate Committee on Health, Labour and Social Welfare
  - Chair: Mohammed Kuti (URP)
  - Vice Chair: Kittony Zipporah (KANU)
- Senate Committee on Legal Affairs and Human Rights
  - Chair: Amos Wako (ODM)
  - Vice Chair: Sang Stephen (URP)
- Senate Committee on National Security and Foreign Relations
  - Chair: Yusuf Haji (TNA)
  - Vice Chair: Dullo Fatuma (URP)
- Senate Committee on Agriculture, Land and Natural Resources
  - Chair: Kivuti Lenny (APK)
  - Vice Chair: George Khaniri (UDF)
- Senate Delegated Legislation Committee
  - Chair: Kisasa Mshenga Mvita (URP)
  - Vice Chair: Sijeny Judith Achieng (WDM-K)
- Senate Implementation Committee
  - Chair: James Orengo (ODM)
  - Vice Chair: Kanainza Nyongesa Daisy (ODM)
- Senate Devolved Government Committee
  - Chair: Murkomen Kipchumba (URP)
  - Vice Chair: Wangari Martha (UDF)
