= 11th Parliament of Kenya =

←	10th	12th	→
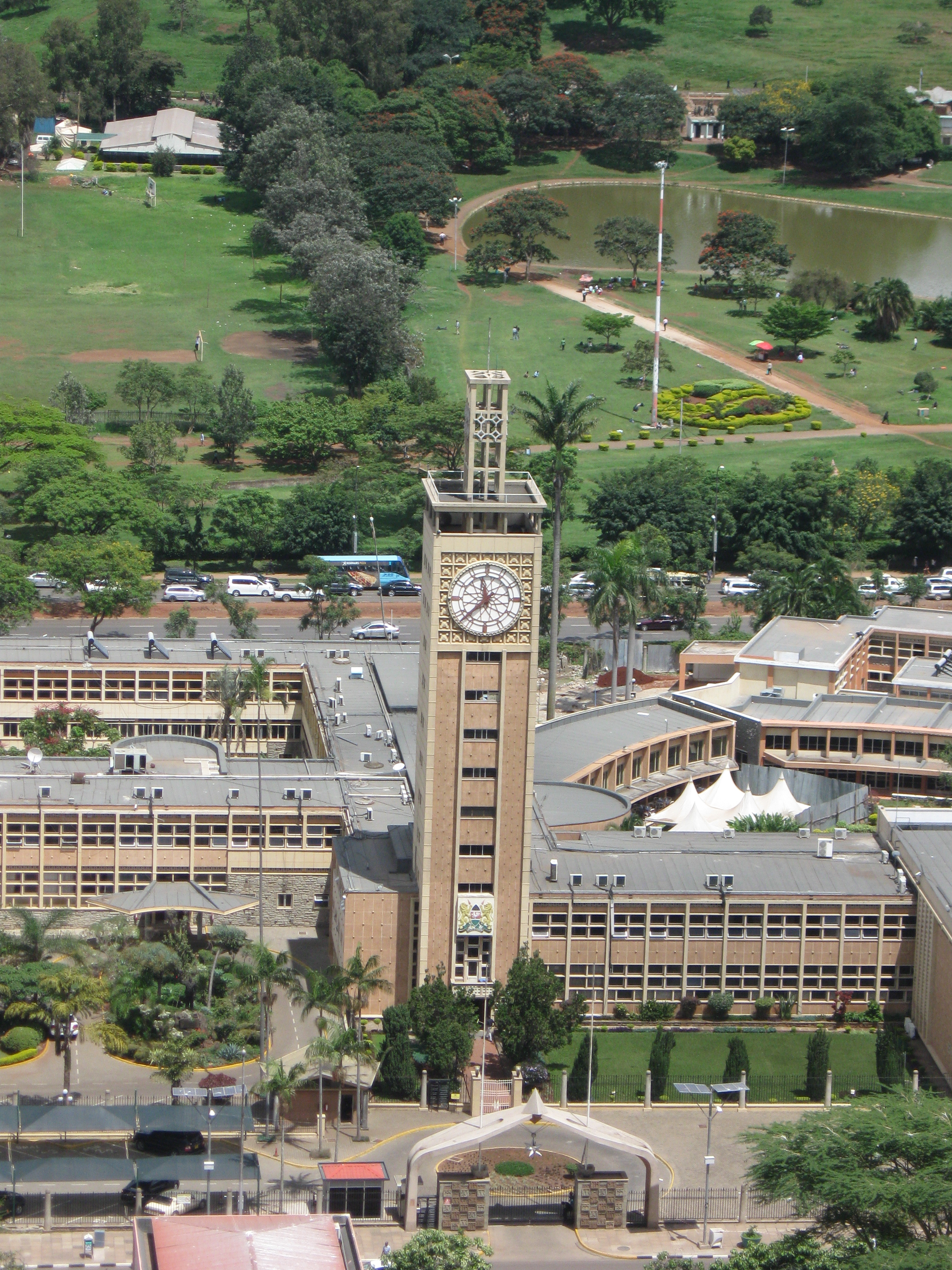
- Parliamentary Buildings, Nairobi

Overview
- Legislative body: Parliament of Kenya
- Meeting place: Nairobi
- Term: 28 March 2013 – 15 June 2017
- Election: 4 March 2013
- Government: Jubilee Alliance
- Opposition: Coalition for Reforms and Democracy
- Website: www.parliament.go.ke

National Assembly
- Members: 349
- Speaker: Justin Muturi
- Deputy Speaker: Joyce Laboso
- Majority Leader: Aden Duale
- Minority Leader: Francis Nyenze
- Party control: Jubilee Alliance

Senate
- Members: 67
- Speaker: Ekwee Ethuro
- Deputy Speaker: Kembi Gitura
- Majority Leader: Kithure Kindiki (2013–2016); Kipchumba Murkomen (2016–2017)
- Minority Leader: Moses Wetang'ula (until 2013); Hassan Abdurrahman (acting, from 2013)
- Party control: Jubilee Alliance

Sessions
- 1st: 28 March 2013 – 5 December 2013
- 2nd: 11 February 2014 – 4 December 2014

The 11th Parliament of Kenya was the meeting of the legislative branch of the national government of Kenya, which began on 28 March 2013. It is the first Parliament to incorporate the structural reforms laid out in the 2010 Constitution. The constitution re-established the Senate and increased the size of the National Assembly from 224 seats to 349 seats.

In the 2013 parliamentary elections, the Jubilee Alliance won a majority of seats in both the National Assembly and the Senate.

== Major events ==
- Jubilee signed post-election coalition agreements with the New Ford Kenya, Alliance Party of Kenya, Chama Cha Uzalendo, People Democratic Party, Ford People, and Kenya African National Union. Reports indicate that there are currently 212 Members of the National Assembly who have agreed to work with the Jubilee Alliance.
- On 1 March 2013, the Salaries and Remuneration Commission gazetted salary and benefits for state officers in the executive, parliament, constitutional commissions, independent offices, and county governments. The notice reduced salaries for Members of Parliament from 851,000 Ksh to 532,500 Ksh per month. On 28 May 2013, the National Assembly unanimously voted to adopt the recommendations of the Committee on Delegated Legislation, finding that the SRC's notices were "unconstitutional, unlawful, ultra vires and therefore null and void." On 12 June 2013, the SRC and the Parliamentary Service Commission agreed to maintain the reduced salaries, allowed for annual pay increases, and increased other allowances and benefits.
- In November 2013, the parliament moved a motion to remove the cabinet secretary for Land, Housing and Urban Development, Charity Ngilu on grounds that she breached the Kenyan constitution by making some appointments at the ministry. She was accused of appointing the director-general without involving the parliament which is a requirement of the law.

== Party summary ==
=== Senate ===
Senate Party standings (at the beginning of this Parliament) 30 Jubilee 6 Amani 3 Unaffiliated 28 CORD

	Party (Shading indicates majority caucus)				Total	Vacant
	Jubilee	Amani	Jubilee-Affiliated	CORD	Total	Vacant
Begin	30	6	3	28	67	0
27 April 2013	30	6	3	27	66	1
1 August 2013	30	6	3	28	67	0
16 October 2013	30	6	3	27	66	1
4 February 2014	30	6	3	28	67	0

=== National Assembly ===
National Assembly Party standings (at the beginning of this Parliament) 167 Jubilee 24 Amani 17 Unaffiliated 141 CORD

	Party (Shading indicates majority caucus)					Total	Vacant
	Jubilee	Amani	Jubilee-Affiliated	CORD	Unaffiliated	Total	Vacant
Begin	167	24	21	133	4	349	0
20 August 2013	167	24	21	132	4	348	1
22 August 2013	167	24	21	132	3	347	2
2 October 2013	167	25	20	132	3	347	2
10 October 2013	167	25	20	131	3	346	3
25 October 2013 (Note: Except in the case of death, official vacancy dates are listed as the date in which the Speaker issues notice a notice of vacancy to be published in the Kenya Gazette. News media outlets generally place date of vacancy at the time of the court ruling, though usually there is a discrepancy between a court ruling and the Speaker's declaration of vacancy (see Changes in Membership). In the case of vacancies in Bomachoge Borabu and Nyaribari Chache, no such notice from the National Assembly Speaker appears to be publicly available. However, Kisumu Court of Appeals judges found in the dispute over the seat for Nyaribari Chache that a vacancy notice from the National Assembly Speaker was published on 25 October 2013. Since both seats were declared vacant on the same day by the same court, it is approximated that both seats became vacant on or near 25 October.)	166	25	20	130	3	344	5
30 October 2013	166	25	20	131	3	345	4
5 November 2013	166	25	20	131	4	346	3
5 December 2013	166	25	20	132	4	347	2
11 February 2014	167	25	21	132	4	349	0

== Leadership ==
Senate

- Speaker — Ekwee Ethuro
- Deputy Speaker — Kembi Gitura

Majority (Jubilee) leadership

- Majority Leader — Kindiki Kithure
- Deputy Majority Leader — Charles Keter
- Majority Chief Whip — Susan Kihika
- Majority Deputy Chief Whip — Mike Sonko

Minority (CORD) leadership

- Minority Leader — Moses Wetangula
- Deputy Minority Leader — Hassan Abdurrahman
- Minority Chief Whip — Johnstone Muthama
- Minority Deputy Chief Whip — Janet Ongera

National Assembly

- Speaker — Justin Muturi
- Deputy Speaker — Joyce Laboso

Majority (Jubilee) leadership

- Majority Leader — Aden Duale
- Deputy Majority Leader — Naomi Shaban
- Majority Chief Whip — Katoo ole Metito
- Majority Deputy Chief Whip — Benjamin Washiali

Minority (CORD) leadership

- Minority Leader — Francis Mwanzia Nyenze
- Deputy Minority Leader — Jakoyo Midiwo
- Minority Chief Whip — Thomas Ludindi Mwadeghu
- Minority Deputy Chief Whip — Chris Wamalwa

== Committees ==
=== Senate ===
House Keeping Committees

- Rules and Business Committee
  - Chair — Ekwee Ethuro
- Liaison Committee

Standing/Portfolio Committees

- Committee on Education, Information and Technology
  - Chair — Mutahi Kagwe (NARC)
  - Vice Chair — Mohamud Halima Abdille (ODM)
- Committee on Energy, Roads and Transportation
  - Chair — Gideon Moi (KANU)
  - Vice Chair — Mwakulegwa Danson Mwazo (ODM)
- Committee on Finance, Commerce and Economic Affairs
  - Chair — Billow Kerrow (URP)
  - Vice Chair — Peter Mositet (TNA)
- Committee on Health, Labour and Social Welfare
  - Chair — Mohammed Kuti (URP)
  - Vice Chair — Kittony Zipporah (KANU)
- Committee on Legal Affairs and Human Rights
  - Chair — Amos Wako (ODM)
  - Vice Chair — Sang Stephen (URP)
- Committee on National Security and Foreign Relations
  - Chair — Yusuf Haji (TNA)
  - Vice Chair — Dullo Fatuma (URP)
- Committee on Agriculture, Land and Natural Resources
  - Chair — Kivuti Lenny (APK)
  - Vice Chair — George Khaniri (UDF)

Sessional Committees

- Delegated Legislation Committee
  - Chair — Kisasa Mshenga Mvita (URP)
  - Vice Chair — Sijeny Judith Achieng (WDM-K)
- Senate Implementation Committee
  - Chair — James Orengo (ODM)
  - Vice Chair — Kanainza Nyongesa Daisy (ODM)
- Devolved Government Committee
  - Chair — Murkomen Kipchumba (URP)
  - Vice Chair — Wangari Martha (UDF)

=== National Assembly ===
House Keeping Committees

- House Business Committee
  - Chair — Justin Muturi
- Committee on Selection
  - Chair — Aden Duale (URP)
  - Vice Chair — Francis Nyenze
- Procedure and House Rules Committee
  - Chair — Justin Muturi
- Liaison Committee
  - Chair — Joyce Laboso
- Catering and Health Club Committee
  - Chair — Janet Nangabo Wanyama
  - Vice Chair — Elijah Lagat

Standing Committees

- Committee on Appointments
  - Chair — Justin Muturi
- Public Accounts Committee
  - Chair — Nicholas Gumbo ( Rarieda )
  - Vice Chair — Jackson Rop ( Kipkelion west, URP )
- Public Investments Committee
  - Chair — Adan Keynan
  - Vice Chair — Kimani Ichung'wah
- Budget and Appropriations Committee
  - Chair — Mutava Musyimi
  - Vice Chair — Mary Emaase
- Committee on Implementation
  - Chair — Roselinda Soipan
  - Vice Chair — David Gikaria
- Committee on Delegated Legislation
  - Chair — William Cheptumo
  - Vice Chair — Joseph Gitari
- Committee on Regional Integration
  - Chair — Florence Kajuju
  - Vice Chair — Christopher Nakuleu

Departmental Committees

- Defence and Foreign Relations Committee
  - Chair — Ndungu Gethenji
  - Vice Chair — Elias Bare Shill
- Administration and National Security Committee
  - Chair — Asman Kamama
  - Vice Chair — Alois Lentoimanga
- Agriculture, Livestock and Cooperatives Committee
  - Chair — Ayub Savula
  - Vice Chair — Kareke Mbiuki
- Environment and Natural Resources Committeemembers
  - Chair — Amina Abdalla
  - Vice Chair — Alexander Kosgey
- Education, Research and Technology Committee
  - Chair — Sabina Chege
  - Vice Chair — Julius Melly
- Energy, Communication and Information Committee
  - Chair — Jamleck Kamau
  - Vice Chair — Jackson Kiptanui
- Finance, Planning and Trade Committee
  - Chair — Benjamin Langat
  - Vice Chair — Nelson Gaichuhie
- Health Committee
  - Chair — Rachel Nyamai
  - Vice Chair — Robert Pukose
- Justice and Legal Affairs Committee
  - Chair — Samuel Chepkong'a
  - Vice Chair — Priscilla Nyokabi
- Labour and Social Welfare Committee
  - Chair — David Were
  - Vice Chair — Tiyah Galgalo
- Lands Committee
  - Chair — Alex Mwiru
  - Vice Chair — Moses Ole Sakuda
- Transport, Public Works and Housing Committee
  - Chair — Maina Kamanda
  - Vice Chair — Amb. M. Maalim

Other Committees

- Committee on Constituency Development Fund
  - Chair — Moses Lessonet
  - Vice Chair — Esther Gathogo
- Constitution Implementation Oversight Committee
  - Chair — Njoroge Baiya
  - Vice Chair — Joyce Akai Emanikor
- Pensions Committee
  - Chair — Justin Muturi

=== Joint Committees ===
- Committee on National Cohesion and Equal Opportunity
- Committee on Parliamentary Broadcasting and Library

== Administrative officers ==
- Parliamentary Joint Services Director General — Clement Nyandiere
- Parliamentary Joint Services - Litigation and Compliance Director — Anthony Thiong'o Njoroge
- Centre for Parliamentary Studies and Training Director — Nyokabi Kamau
- Finance and Accounting Services Director — Paul Onyangoh
- Information and Research Services Director — Paul Ngetich
- Chief, Security and Safety — Solomon Obange
- Maintenance and Buildings Chief Engineer — Eng. Pius Kioko
- Commission Secretariat Head — Shadia Fary
- Internal Audit Head — Amos Guchu (acting)

=== Senate ===
- Clerk — Jeremiah Nyegenye
- Senior Deputy Clerk — Consolata Waithera Munga
- Legal Services Director — Eunice Gichangi
- Committee Services Director — Samuel Njenga Njuguna
- Legislative and Procedural Services Director — Serah Kioko
- Speaker's Office Director — Mohammed Ali Mohammed
- Chief Serjeant-at-Arms — Maj. (Rtd) Samson Sorobit
- Hansard Editor — Gladys Ingoyi Ndenda

=== National Assembly ===
- Clerk — Michael Silai
- Senior Deputy Clerk — Michael Rotich Sialai
- Legal Services Director — Jeremiah Ndombi
- Committee Services Director — Florence Abonyo
- Committee Services Deputy Director- Peter Chemweno
- Legislative and Procedural Services Director — James Mwangi
- Legislative and Procedural Services Deputy Director - Samuel Njoroge
- Speaker's Office Director — Nancy Mukunya
- Chief Serjeant-at-Arms — Aloisie Lekulo
- Hansard Editor — Jeremiah Kiema
