= 2013 Kenyan local elections =

Local elections were held in Kenya on 4 March 2013 as part of the general elections. Voters elected governors and members of County Assemblies of the 47 counties created by the 2010 constitution.

== Electoral system ==
Kenyan law requires governors to have a recognised university degree. This clause resulted in challenges for aspirants including Soita Shitanda in Kakamenga and Margaret Wanjiru in Nairobi

County Representative were elected in single member wards, of which there were a total of 1,450. Several County Representatives were also nominated to represent youths and disabled people in the various county assemblies from party lists, and after the elections 680 women were also nominated to the various county assemblies to ensure gender balance.

== Results ==
=== Governors ===
#	County	Governor	Deputy Governor	Party
1	Mombasa	Hassan Ali Joho	Hazel Ezabel Nyamoki Ogunde	ODM
2	Kwale	Salim Mvurya	Fatuma Achani	ODM
3	watamu ward	Amason Kingi	Kenneth Mwakombo Kamto	ODM
4	Tana River	Tuneya Dado	Jire Siyat Mohamed	WDM-K
5	Lamu	Issa Timamy	Erick Kinyua Mugo	UDF
6	Taita-Taveta	John Mtuta Mruttu	Mary Ndiga Kibuka	ODM
7	Garissa	Nathif Jama Adan	Abdullahi Hussein Ali	WDM-K
8	Wajir	Ahmed Abdullahi Mohamad	Abdulhafid Abdullahi Yarow	ODM
9	Mandera	Ibrahim Roba Ali	Omar Mohamed Maalim	URP
10	Marsabit	Ukur Yattani	Omar Abdi Ali	ODM
11	Isiolo	Godana Doyo	Mohamed Gulleid Abdille	URP
12	Meru	Peter Munya	Raphael Muriungi	APK
13	Tharaka	Samuel Mbae Ragwa	Eliud Mate Muriithi	TNA
14	Embu	Martin Nyaga Wambora	Dorothy Nditi Muchungu	TNA
15	Kitui	Julius Malombe	Malonza Peninah	WDM-K
16	Machakos	Alfred Mutua	Benard Muia Tom Kiala	WDM-K
17	Makueni	Kivutha Kibwana	Adelina Ndeto Mwau	MP
18	Nyandarua	Daniel Waithaka Mwangi	Waithaka Mwangi Kirika	TNA
19	Nyeri	Nderitu Gachagua	Wamathai Samwel Githaiga	GNU
20	Kirinyaga	Joseph Kathuri Ndathi	Julius Muthike Njiri	TNA
21	Muranga	Mwangi wa Iria	Augustine J Gakure Monyo	TNA
22	Kiambu	William Kabogo	Gerald Gakuha Githinji	TNA
23	Turkana	Josphat Nanok	Peter Ekai Lokoel	ODM
24	West Pokot	Simon Kachapin Kitalei	Titus Lotee	KANU
25	Samburu	Moses Lenolkula Kasaine	Joseph Lemarkat	URP
26	Trans-Nzoia	Patrick Khaemba	Stanley Kiptoo Kenei Tarus	FORD-Kenya
27	Uasin Gishu	Jackson Kiplagat Mandago	Daniel Kiplagat Kiprotich	URP
28	Elgeyo-Marakwet	Alex Tanui Tolgos	Gabriel Lagat Kosgey	URP
29	Nandi	Lagat Cleophas	Dominic Kimutai Biwott	URP
30	Baringo	Benjamin Cheboi Chesire	Mathew Kipyator Tuitoek	URP
31	Laikipia	Joshua Irungu	Josphat Gitonga Kabugi|TNA	
32	Nakuru	Kinuthia Mbugua	Joseph Kibore Rutto	TNA
33	Narok	Samuel Kuntai Ole Tunai	Aruasa Evalyn Chepkirui	URP
34	Kajiado	David ole Nkedianye	Paul Mpute Ntiati	ODM
35	Kericho	Prof. Paul Chepkwony Kiprono	Susan Chepkoech Kikwai	URP
36	Bomet	Isaac Ruto	Stephen Kipkoech Mutai	URP
37	Kakamega	Wycliffe Oparanya	Philip Museve Kutima	ODM
38	Vihiga	Moses Akaranga	Caleb Temba Amaswache	PPK
39	Bungoma	Ken Lusaka	Hillary Moywo Chongwony	NFK
40	Busia	Sospeter Ojaamong	Kizito Osore Wangalwa	ODM
41	Siaya	Cornel Rasanga Amoth^{[a]}	Wilson Ouma Onyango	ODM
42	Kisumu	Jack Ranguma	Ruth Adhiambo Odinga Busia	ODM
43	Homabay	Cyprian Awiti	Hamiliton Onyango Orata	ODM
44	Migori	John Obado	Nelson Mahanga Mwita	PDP
45	Kisii	James Ongwae	Arthur Maangi Gongera	ODM
46	Nyamira	John Nyagarama Obiero	Amos Kimwomi Nyaribo	ODM
47	Nairobi	Evans Kidero	J. Mwangangi Mueke	ODM
Source: IEBC

^{a} Cornel Rasanga's election as Siaya governor was nullified in August 2013 following a petition at the High Court in Kisumu. He won the subsequent by-election and was sworn in again as governor.

==== By party ====
Party or alliance		Seats
Coalition for Reforms and Democracy	Orange Democratic Movement	16
Coalition for Reforms and Democracy	Wiper Democratic Movement – Kenya	4
Coalition for Reforms and Democracy	FORD-Kenya	1
Coalition for Reforms and Democracy	Muungano Party	1
Coalition for Reforms and Democracy	Peoples Democratic Party	1
Coalition for Reforms and Democracy	Total	23
Jubilee Alliance	United Republican Party	10
Jubilee Alliance	The National Alliance	8
Jubilee Alliance	Total	18
Amani Coalition	Kenya African National Union	1
Amani Coalition	New Ford Kenya	1
Amani Coalition	United Democratic Forum Party	1
Amani Coalition	Total	3
Alliance Party of Kenya		1
Grand National Union		1
Progressive Party of Kenya		1
Total		47
