= 2013 Murang'a local elections =

Local elections in Kenya

The 2013 gubernatorial elections for Murang'a County, Kenya, were held on 4 March 2013. Under the new constitution, which was passed in a 2010 referendum, the 2013 general elections were the first in which Governors and members of the County Assemblies for the newly created counties were elected. They will also be the first general elections run by the Independent Electoral and Boundaries Commission(IEBC) which has released the official list of candidates.

== Gubernatorial election ==
Candidate	Running Mate	Coalition	Party	Votes
Kaberere, Julius Ndungu	Karuru, Michael Kamotho		Alliance Party of Kenya	--
Karenge, Gacuru Wa	Gachoka, Wilfred Mwangi		Saba Saba Asili	--
Mwangi, Moses Ndung'u	Kihara, Charles Njuru		Mzalendo Saba Saba	--
Mwangi, Wa Iria	Monyo, Augustine J Gakure		The National Alliance	--
Njuguna, Samuel Mwangi	Maina, John Kamau		Orange Democratic Movement	--

== Prospective candidates ==
The following are some of the candidates who had made public their intentions to run:

- Joshua Toro - former Roads assistant minister
- Francis Mwangi - former New KCC managing director
- Julius Kaberere - Commonwealth Technocrat
- Moses Mwangi - Murang’a County Initiative chairman
- Peter Karanja - an Anglican priest (He however dropped out of the race citing intimidation and threats to his life.)
