= Hezena Lemaletian =

Kenyan politician

Hezena Lemaletian is a nominated senator in the Kenyan Parliament under the Orange Democratic Movement (ODM).

She graduated from the University of Nairobi in 2015. In March 2026, she accused German embassy in Nairobi of racial discrimination against blacks and Kenyans after being kept waiting for several hours at the gate of the embassy while whites were allowed into the premises.

== Employment history ==
| From | To | Employer | Position Held |
|---|---|---|---|
| 2015 | 2017 | Ministry of Environment Mineral and Natural Resources | Finance Assistant |
| 2013 | 2015 | Tourism Fund (CTDLT) | Finance Assistant |
