= Murungi =

Murungi is a surname. Notable people with the surname include:

- Kagendo Murungi (1971–2017), Kenyan feminist, LGBT rights activist and filmmaker
- Kathuri Murungi, Kenyan politician
- Kiraitu Murungi (born 1952), Kenyan politician, lawyer, and civil rights advocate
