= Janet Ong'era =

Kenyan politician

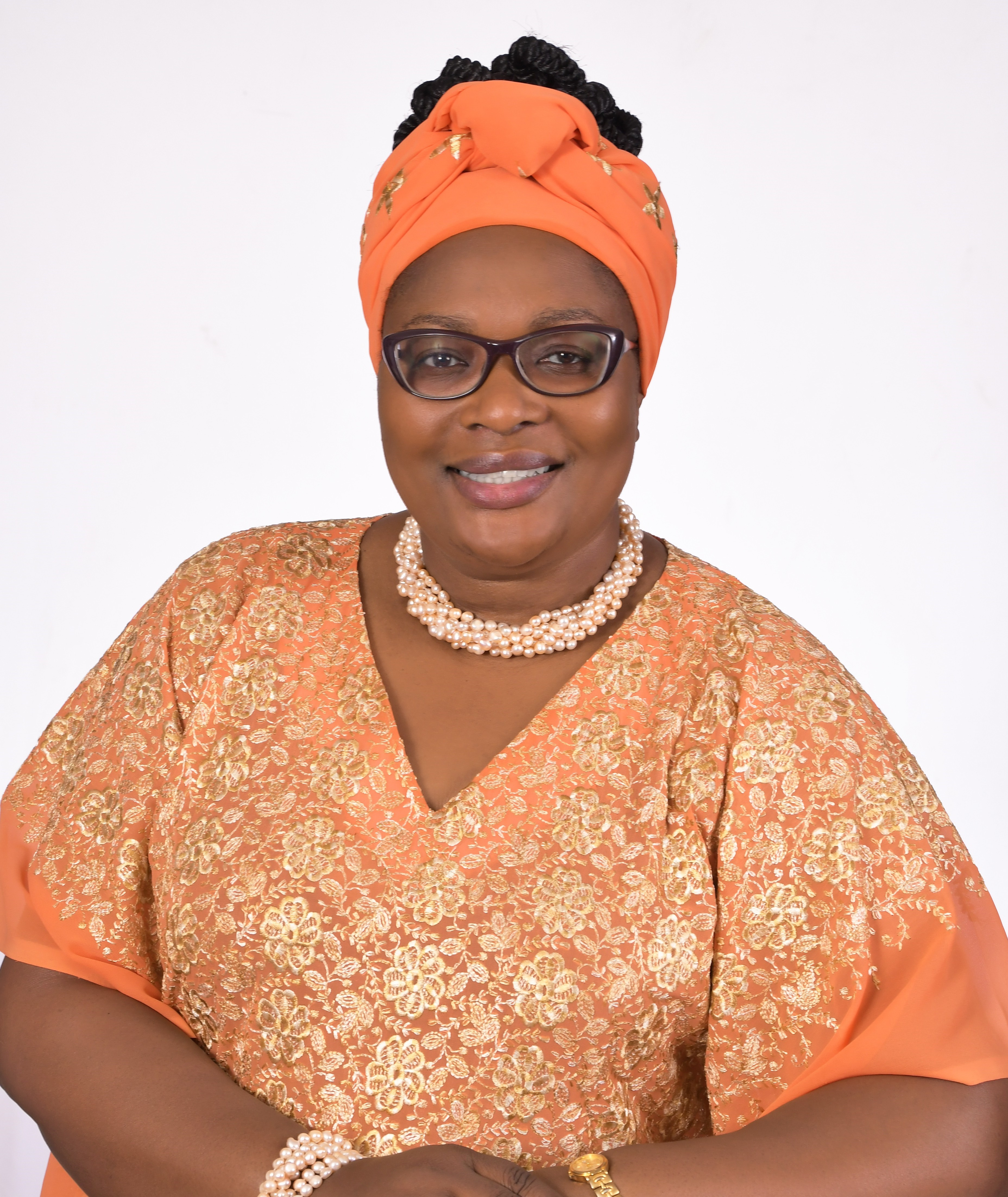

Janet Ong'era

Janet Ong'era is the immediate former Kisii County Woman Member of the National Assembly (2017-2022) in the Republic of Kenya. She is the Chairperson of the Eastern Africa Region at the Pan African Parliament.

She is an advocate of the High Court of Kenya and the Managing Partner in the law firm Ongera and Company.

From the year 2013 - 2017 Ong'era was nominated by her Party The Orange Democratic Movement to serve as a Senator in the 11th Parliament. At the senate she was the Minority Deputy Whip and a member of The Kenyan Delegation to the Pan African Parliament

Ong'era served as the Executive Director of the Orange Democratic Movement and during her tenure she successfully conducted party primaries of which her Political Party Orange Democratic Movement won 95 Parliamentary and 3380 civics seats in 2007 General Elections and won 118 Parliamentary seats and 367 members of the County Assembly in 2013 General Elections. Janet Onge'ra was also the director of the two Kenyan Constitution referendums conducted in 2005 and 2010, and both polls were won by her team.

Ong'era is the Founder and Patron of Kisii County Women Agribusiness Empowerment (KCWAES), a savings and credit cooperative society that empowers women to grow and transform their economic status. She has a number of initiatives that are aimed at empowering the Kisii County Society.

Ong’era is also a life member of the following organizations:

- League of Women Voters
- Maendeleo Ya Wanawake
- Oversight Board Member, Centre for Multi-Party Democracy
- Law Society of Kenya
- Global Platform for UN Disaster Risk Reduction

== Early life ==
The Hon. Janet Ong’era was born on 5 July 1965 to the late Mama Peripetua Nyang’ate Ong’era and the late Mzee William Ong’era. Her mother was a vegetable vendor in Kisii Municipal Market and her father a Prisons officer.

Ong’era attended Nubia Primary School in Kisii County and Bernard Estate Primary School, where she excelled and joined Precious Blood Riruta Secondary School for O level and Moi Girls High School, Eldoret for her A-levels. She holds a Bachelor of Laws Degree from the University of Nairobi and a Diploma in Laws from the Kenya School of Law.

== Career ==
Ong'era's other career roles have included:

- Deputy Managing Director/ Corporation Secretary, Kenya Airports Authority Acting Managing Director, Kenya Airports Authority
- Registrar of Titles, Ministry of Lands
- State Counsel, Office of the Attorney General
- Elected President Africa Region, Airports Council International
