= Gibson Kamau Kuria =

Kenyan lawyer

Gibson Kamau Kuria (born 3 March 1947 in Mahiga Location, Othaya Division, Nyeri District) is a Kenyan lawyer and a recipient of the Robert F. Kennedy Human Rights Award for 1988.

== Early education ==
Kuria started his formal education at Mahiga Intermediate School from 1954 to 1961 before going on to high school at Kagumo High School from 1962 to 1967.

== Higher education ==
Kuria graduated in March 1971 with a Bachelor of Laws degree (Upper Division) at the then University of East Africa, University College, Dar-es-Salaam, Tanzania. He then pursued a Bachelor of Civil Law at Oxford University. He was awarded the Doctorate of Laws by Lewis & Clark Law School, Oregon, US, because of his human rights work.

== Career ==
In May 1971 Kuria was appointed a tutorial fellow in the Faculty of Law, University of Nairobi, where he taught law and carried out research between then and September 1972 and 1975. In 1974 he was appointed lecturer, Faculty of Law, by the University of Nairobi, where he taught law and researched between 1974 and 26 February 1987, when he was arrested and detained without trial until 12 December 1987, publishing articles on the rule of law, legal education, legal profession, human rights, and family law. In 1975 he started legal activism with a few practicing lawyers in the Kenya bar, including Paul Muite, former Attorney-General of Kenya Amos Wako, and two other attorneys.

Since 1975, Kuria has published many articles on constitutionalism, rule of law, human rights, legal education, family law, and succession in such scholarly journals as The East African Law Journal. During this time he also represented Wanyiri Kihoro, against the State over violations against Human Rights committed against Mr Kihoro whilst in detention in the famous Nyayo House torture chambers. he was arrested and spent time detained without charge at Naivasha Maximum Security Prison for his involvement in the case whilst his partner in his law firm Kiraitu Murungi was forced into exile.

In July 1995 he was elected secretary general of the East Africa Law Society. In this capacity, Kuria devised programs for promoting regional integration with a view to establishing an East African federal state to be served by a Federal bar Association and published two articles on how to establish an East African federal state and enforce a Bill of Rights. He served in that position until April 1998. Between 1997 and 1998 Kuria served as the vice-chairman of the Law Society of Kenya, rising to chairman from March 1999 to 2001. This bar association has been in the forefront in the struggle to restore constitutionalism. On 22 February 2003 he was appointed by the president a member of a tribunal to enquire into allegations of the Chief Justice's inability to discharge the functions of his office; the CJ resigned about a week after the setting up of the commission. On 28 March 2003, Kuria was appointed by the president to serve as assisting counsel in the commission to enquire into the Goldenberg scandal.

== Awards and achievements ==
- 1988 – Awarded the Robert F. Kennedy Human Rights Award from the Robert F. Kennedy Center for Justice and Human Rights; The Kenya government which had confiscated Dr. Kuria’s passport refused to allow him to travel to the US to receive the award;
- 1988 – The Lawyers Committee for Human Rights award – Hon. Paul Muite, Kenyan lawyer and chairman of the Parliament Select Committee on Constitutional Reform, travelled to the US and received the award on Dr. Kuria’s behalf and his passport was confiscated upon his return to Kenya,
- August 1990 – Kuria was awarded the Rule of Law Award by the American Bar Association for his work in human rights in Kenya,
- December 1990 – received Human Rights Watch's award as a human rights monitor,
- 1993 – Kuria was awarded the Jurists of the Year Award by the International Commission of Jurists (Kenya Chapter).
