= 2013 Kakamega local elections =

Elections held in Kenya

Local elections were held in Kakamega County to elect a Governor and County Assembly on 4 March 2013. Under the new constitution, which was passed in a 2010 referendum, the 2013 general elections were the first in which Governors and members of the County Assemblies for the newly created counties were elected.

== Gubernatorial election ==
| Candidate | Running Mate | Coalition | Party | Votes |
|---|---|---|---|---|
| Mwilitsa, Albert Stanslous | Chiluka, Caleb Musire | | United Republican Party | -- |
| Ndombi, Lawrence Simbauni | Echessa, Francis Kangwana | Cord | Federal Party of Kenya | -- |
| Olando, Paul Polland | Mukhwana, Mohammed | | United Democratic Forum Party | -- |
| Oparanyah, Wycliffe Ambetsa | Kutima, Philip Museve | | Orange Democratic Movement | -- |
| Shitanda, Soita Peter | Omusotsi, David Wamatsi | | New Ford Kenya | -- |
| Wangia, Jared Waudo | Wangia, Christine Ongayo | | Independent | -- |

== Prospective candidates ==
The following are some of the candidates who have made public their intentions to run:

- Wycliffe Oparanya - Minister Planning Development and Vision 2030
- Soita Shitanda - Minister Housing
- Paul Olando - former Nyanza Provincial Commissioner
- Albert Mwilitsa - former Turkana North District Commissioner
- Simbauni Ndombi - businessman
- Suleiman Sumba - former Kenya army officer
