= Nerima Wako-Ojiwa =

Kenyan political analyst, who serves as the executive director of Siasa Place

- Born: 1989 (age 36–37); Nairobi, Kenya
- Citizenship: Kenyan
- Education: Jacksonville State University (Bachelor of Arts in Journalism and Sociology) (Master of Public Administration)
- Occupations: Political Analyst & Corporate Executive
- Years active: Since 2014
- Title: Executive Director of Siasa Place
- Predecessor: None

Nerima Wako-Ojiwa (née Nerima Wako), is a Kenyan political analyst, who serves as the executive director of Siasa Place, an organization, led by young people that engages young Kenyans, educating them about the constitution, governance and electoral processes, through community engagements and social media.

== Background and education ==
Nerima was born in Nairobi, Kenya's capital, circa 1989, the third-born in a family of four children. She attended St. Nicholas Primary School, before finishing her high school at Aga Khan Academy, both in Nairobi.

After high school, she secured a scholarship to study at Jacksonville State University, in Jacksonville, Alabama in the United States. She graduated with a Bachelor of Arts degree in Journalism and Sociology. Later, she was awarded a Master of Public Administration degree, also by Jacksonville State University.

== Career ==
While at university, Nerima participated in campus politics and was elected president of the International Student's Organization. This allowed her to receive a solid grounding in her political attributes and weaknesses.

In 2015, she together with other young people started a youth-led organization called Siasa Place. For the first year, they funded the organization's operations out of their own pockets, before they received any outside funding. Nerima serves as the executive director.

In 2024, she publicly condemned the creation of AI-based jobs by American companies in Kenya, which she labeled as "modern-like slavery".

== Family ==
Nerima is married to Billian Ojiwa, who is also involved in politics. She is a niece to Senator Amos Wako who represents Busia County in the Kenyan Senate, (2013–2017) and (2017–2022).

== See also ==
- Susan Oguya
- Borna Nyaoke-Anoke
