= Millicent Omanga =

Kenyan politician and Businesswoman

Hon Millicent Omanga

Senator

Personal details
- Born: 30 May 1982 (age 44) Kisii Kenya
- Party: Jubilee Party
- Other political affiliations: United Democratic Alliance; Democracy for the Citizens Party
- Education: University of Nairobi
- Occupation: Politician

Millicent Omanga (born 30 May 1982) is a Kenyan politician and businesswoman who served as a nominated Senator in Kenya under the Jubilee Party.

== Education ==
Omanga has a degree in journalism and a master's degree in commerce from the University of Nairobi.

== Career ==
Before joining politics, Omanga was involved in business ventures in Nairobi.

== Political career ==
Omanga contested the Nairobi Woman Representative seat during the 2017 Kenyan general election under the Jubilee Party ticket but was unsuccessful. She was later nominated to the Senate of Kenya, where she served from 2017 to 2022. She was a member of the Jubilee Party and later aligned herself with the United Democratic Alliance (UDA). In 2026, Omanga joined the Democracy for the Citizens Party (DCP) after leaving the United Democratic Alliance.

In 2023, Omanga was appointed to a government position as a member of the Board of the Kenya Shipyards Limited.
