= 2013 Isiolo local elections =

Elections in Isiolo County, Kenya

Local elections were held in Isiolo County to elect a Governor and County Assembly on 4 March 2013. Under the new constitution, which was passed in a 2010 referendum, the 2013 general elections were the first in which Governors and members of the County Assemblies for the newly created counties were elected. They will also be the first general elections run by the Independent Electoral and Boundaries Commission(IEBC) which has released the official list of candidates.

== Gubernatorial election ==
Candidate	Running Mate	Coalition	Party	Votes
Adhi, Godana Doyo	Abdille, Muhamed Gulleid		United Republican Party	--
Ali, Abdul Bahari	Lenawasae, Patrick		The National Alliance	--
Dogo, Yusuf Wako	Ntongondu, Nicholas Mugambi		Wiper Democratic Movement – Kenya	--
Maingi, Laikuru Domiziano	Lekoona, David Kitopia		Alliance Party of Kenya	--

=== Prospective candidates ===
The following are some of the candidates who have made public their intentions to run:

- Godana Doyo - a lawyer
- Abdul Bahari Ali - Isiolo South MP
- Yussuf Dogo - Coordinator, Friends of Nomads
- Domiciano Mainge - Businessman

== County Assembly ==
Elected representatives included:

- Isiolo North - Joseph Samal
- Isiolo South - Abdullah Jaldesa Banticha
