= Kericho High School =

Location
- P.O. Box 252- 20200; Kericho, Kericho; Kenya

Information
- Other names: K-Hetch bazuus'
- School type: Public
- Motto: Elimu ni Uhai
- Established: 1959
- Principal: Daniel Chelule
- Grades: 9-12
- Gender: Male
- Enrollment: 1200
- Color: Green
- Mascot: Green Bisons
- Website: http://www.kerichohigh.ac.ke/

Kericho High School is a Kenyan boys secondary school, located in Kericho, Kericho County about 3.9kilometers from Kericho Town CBD. The current principal is Dr Daniel Chelule. Edwin Cheres the soin sigowet Mp aspirant 2022 is one of the alumnae. Former Kericho County governor Paul Chepkwony, current Ainamoi MP constituency Benjamin Langat, former Kericho County senator Charles Keter and the sitting Kericho County Senator Aaron Cheruiyot#:~:text=Aaron Kipkirui Cheruiyot, MGH( born,of the senate in 2022.Aaron Cheruiyot are alumni of Kericho High School

== History ==
The school started on 15 June 1959, with eleven boys and two teachers – Mr. John Bowles the first Head teacher and Mr. Wesley Rono, the first African teacher in the school. It currently has a population of approximately two thousand students.

The school boasts of various notable alumni including:

- Prof. Davy Kiprotich Koech Former and the Longest Serving CEO of Kenya Medical Research Institute and an accomplished scientist.
- Energy Cabinet Secretary Charles Keter
- First governor of Kericho County Professor Paul Chepkwony
- Bomet governor Hillary Barchok
- Kericho Senator Aaron Cheruiyot
- MP Benjamin Langat
- MP David Ole Sankok
- KNUT Secretary General and nominated MP Wilson Sossion
- Current principal Dr Daniel Chelule
- Belgut MP Nelson Koech
- Founder and CEO of Vanguard Alliance Kenya Hon Edwin Kipkemoi Cheres
