= Githu =

Githu is a given name. Notable people with the name include:

- Githu Muigai (born 1960), Attorney General of the Republic of Kenya
- Githu, leader of the Nairobi "Superpower" gang in the Netflix television series Sense8
