= Bonny Khalwale =

Kenyan politician

Member of the Kenyan Senate
- Incumbent
- Assumed office 9 August 2022
- Preceded by: Cleophas Malala
- Constituency: Kakamega County

Member of the Kenyan Senate
- In office 28 March 2013 – August 2017

Member of the Kenyan Parliament
- In office 2002–2013
- Constituency: Ikolomani

Personal details
- Born: 5 August 1960 (age 66) Malinya, Kakamega County, Kenya
- Party: UDA
- Education: University of Nairobi
- Occupation: Politician
- Profession: Doctor

Bonny Khalwale is a Kenyan politician, the current Senator for Kakamega County and a medical doctor.

== Personal details ==
Khalwale, was chairman of the Parliamentary Accounts Committee in the 9th Kenyan Parliament, where he made a reputation for leading censure motions against high profile cabinet ministers. He was appointed on a similar role in the 10th Kenyan Parliament.

He was educated at Musingu High school before proceeding to Kakamega School for his A levels. He graduated from The University of Nairobi with a degree in Medicine in 1987.

== Politics ==
He first ventured into politics in 2002 by winning the Ikolomani Constituency Parliamentary Seat on a NARC party ticket. In 2007, he retained the same seat on a New Ford Kenya party ticket.

His election as an MP in the 2007 Kenyan parliamentary election was nullified in February 2011. Dr Bonny Khalwale won back his Ikolomani seat on 23 May 2011, beating off a strong challenge from the Orange Democratic Movement, the dominant party in the region.

Voters in Ikolomani handed New Ford Kenya’s Dr Khalwale 13,208 votes, followed closely by Mr Bernard Shinali of ODM with 10,702. Ford People’s Collins Matemba came a distant third with 293 votes. A total of 24,592 voters out of the registered 35,833 voted in the 63 polling stations in a by-election seen as a fight between ODM and New Ford-K.

The victory for the man, popularly referred to as the bullfighter, over Mr Shinali, whom he defeated with a slim margin of 200 votes in the 2007 elections, came in the wake of high-profile campaigns mounted by the then ODM leadership led by Deputy Prime Minister Musalia Mudavadi.

The defeat was seen as a blow not only to Mr Mudavadi but also ODM which was restamping its authority in the region where it had more MPs than any other party, and as a boost to the presidential ambitions of Saboti MP Eugene Wamalwa who along with Housing minister Soita Shitanda for the New Ford-K candidate. The by-election was unique in that it attracted leaders Cyrus Jirongo, Mukhisa Kituyi (from Western), Martha Karua and Peter Kenneth from Mount Kenya region to campaign for him. The group were seen to have come together based on their political activism relationship.

In 2012, he comfortably contested and won the Kakamega Senatorial seat on a UDF Party ticket garnering 248,888 votes seeing off a lesser challenge from the wealthy and flamboyant Lugari politician Cyrus Jirongo who got 145,736 votes.
