= Aaron Cheruiyot =

Kenyan politician

Honourable Aaron Kipkirui Cheruiyot

Majority Leader of the Kenyan Senate
- Incumbent
- Assumed office September 2022
- Preceded by: Samuel Poghisio

3rd Member of the Kenyan Senate
- Incumbent
- Assumed office March 2016
- Preceded by: Charles Keter
- Constituency: Kericho County

Personal details
- Born: Aaron Kipkirui Cheruiyot; 23 February 1986 (age 40) Kapchebet, Kabianga, Kenya
- Citizenship: Kenya
- Party: UDA
- Other political affiliations: JP (2016–2022)
- Spouse: Linah Chesang Cheruiyot
- Children: 1
- Education: Moi University, Eldoret. United States International University Africa, Nairobi. Kericho High School
- Occupation: Politician

Aaron Kipkirui Cheruiyot, MGH (born 23 February 1986) is a Kenyan politician. He was elected as senator for Kericho County succeeding Charles Keter who had resigned to take up a cabinet portfolio. He was elected Majority Leader of the senate in 2022.

== Early years and education ==
Aaron Cheruiyot was born in 1986. He grew up in Kericho County. He undertook his primary and secondary education at Unity Primary school and Kericho High School respectively, before proceeding to Moi University in Eldoret where he acquired a BA degree specialising in Language and Literary studies. In 2010 he joined the Kenya Institute of Management and acquired a Diploma in Marketing .

== Personal life ==
Aaron Cheruiyot is married to his longtime girlfriend Lenah. The couple have a daughter Mary Cheruiyot.

Aaron Cheruiyot is a supporter of English Premier League club Manchester United.
