= Gilbert Kabere M'mbijiwe =

Kenyan politician

Gilbert Kabeere M'Mbijjewe was a Kenyan politician. He was a minister for Agriculture and a former member of parliament for the Meru Central and South Imenti Constituency. He had throat cancer.
