= Turkana Central Constituency =

Kenyan electoral constituency

Turkana Central
- constituency for the Parliament of Kenya
- Turkana Central Constituency within Turkana County

- Turkana County within Kenya
- County: Turkana County
- Population: 185,305
- Area: 6,415 km^{2} (2,476.8 sq mi)

Current constituency
- Party: UDA
- Member of Parliament: Joseph Emathe Namuar

Turkana Central Constituency is an electoral constituency in Kenya. It is one of six constituencies in Turkana County. The constituency was established for the 1988 elections.

== Members of Parliament ==
Elections	MP	Party	Notes
1988	Peter Barnabas Ejore	KANU	One-party system.
1992	Peter Barnabas Ejore	KANU	
1994	Immanuel Isaac Ichor Imana	KANU	By-election
1997	David Ethuro	KANU	
2002	David Ethuro	NARC	
2007	David Ethuro	PNU	
2013	John Lodepe Nakara	URP	
2017	John Lodepe Nakara	ODM	
2022	Joseph Emathe Namuar	UDA	

== Wards ==
Wards
Ward	Registered Voters	Local Authority
Kanamkemer	2,966	Lodwar municipality
Kawalase	812	Lodwar municipality
Kenyatta	7,039	Lodwar municipality
Nakwanga	1,032	Lodwar municipality
Napetet	1,444	Lodwar municipality
Napuu	1,849	Lodwar municipality
Kalokol	5,583	Turkana county
Kang'atotha	5,062	Turkana county
Kerio	6,663	Turkana county
Kotaruk	1,037	Turkana county
Loima	1,640	Turkana county
Lomeyan	2,717	Turkana county
Lorengippi	2,127	Turkana county
Lorugum	5,533	Turkana county
Nadapal	3,583	Turkana county
Total	49,087	
*September 2005.
