= Christopher Langat =

Kenyan politician

Honourable Christopher Langat Senator

Member of the Kenyan Parliament
- In office August 2017 – August 2022
- Succeeded by: Hillary Sigei

Personal details
- Party: Jubilee Party
- Education: University of Nairobi; Moi University

Christopher Andrew Langat is a Kenyan politician who is the former senator for Bomet County. He is a member of the Jubilee Party.

He attended the University of Nairobi and Moi University where he obtained a PhD in education.

In 2020 he was appointed to the senate's COVID-19 committee following the resignation of senator Johnson Sakaja.

== Electoral history ==
General election 2017: Bomet
Party	Candidate	Votes	%
Jubilee	Christopher Andrew Langat	140,396	53.3
KANU	Nicholas Kiptoo arap Korir Salat	100,506	38.2
Chama Cha Mashinani	Stephen kiplangat Koskey	13,696	5.2
ODM	Andrew Kimutai Langat	5,061	1.9
Independent	Andrew Kibet Toweet	2,506	1.0
The National Vision Party	Samuel Kipkemoi Kirui	1,087	0.4
Majority		39,890	15.2

1. WTCemployment history

2016-March 2017 he worked in Moi University (Bomet college Campus) as the Dean, School of Human Resource Development
