= Mohamed Faki Mwinyihaji =

Kenyan politician

Honourable Mohamed Faki Mwinyihaji

Senator of Mombasa County
- Incumbent
- Assumed office 31 August 2017

Personal details
- Party: Orange Democratic Movement

Mohamed Faki Mwinyihaji is a Kenyan politician. He is the current senator of Mombasa County
