= Ekwee Ethuro =

Kenyan politician

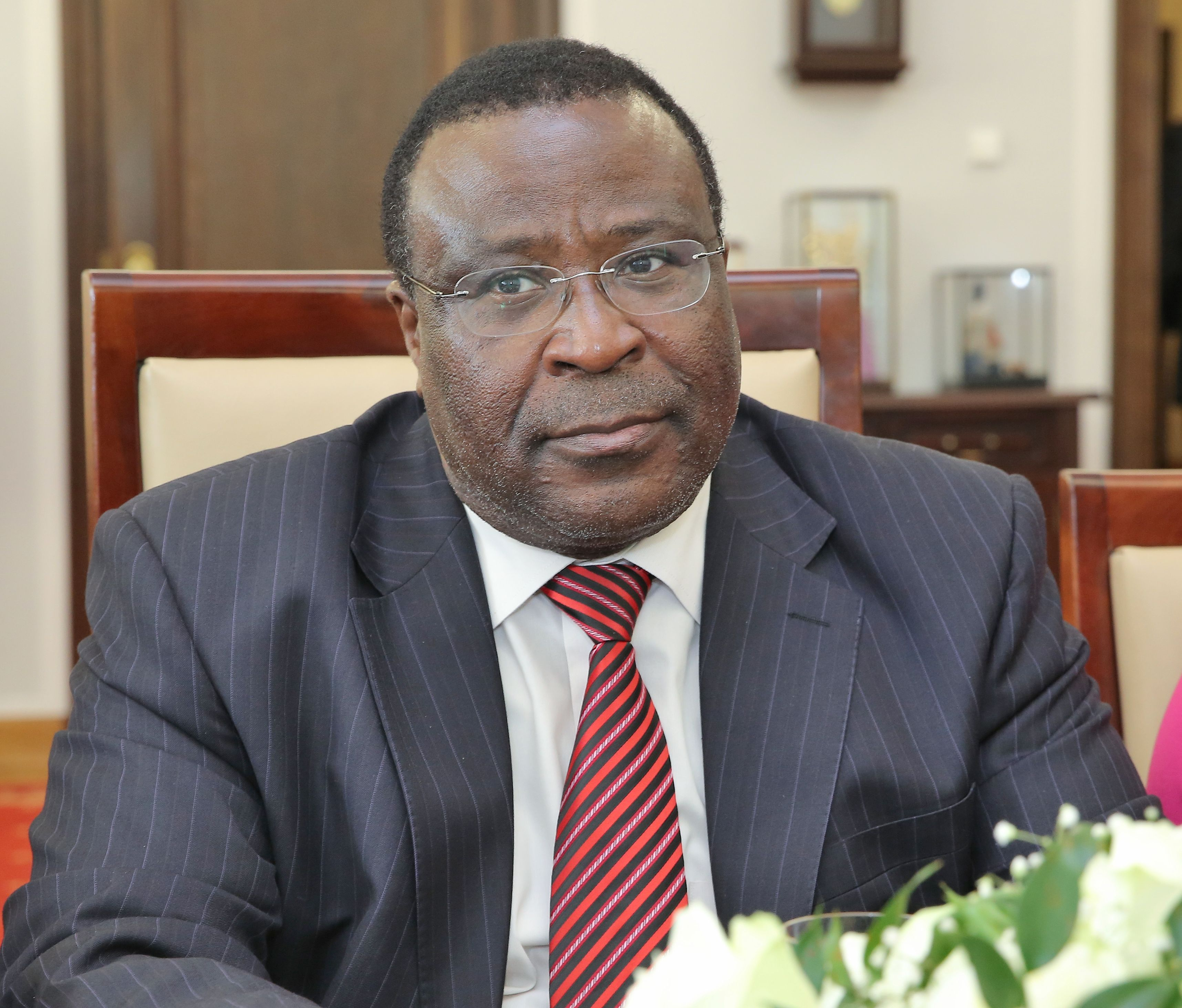
- Ethuro in 2015

1st Speaker of the Kenyan Senate
- In office 28 March 2013 – 31 August 2017
- Deputy: Kembi Gitura
- Succeeded by: Kenneth Lusaka

Member of Parliament for Turkana Central
- In office 3 February 1998 – 14 January 2013
- Preceded by: Immanuel Isaac Ichor Imana
- Succeeded by: John Lodepe Nakara

Assistant Minister for Planning
- In office 14 December 2005 – 10 January 2008
- President: Mwai Kibaki

Assistant Minister for Labour and Human Resource Development
- In office 1998–2002
- President: Daniel arap Moi

Personal details
- Born: 31 December 1963 (age 62)
- Education: University of Nairobi; Clemson University

Ekwee David Ethuro (born 31 December 1963) is a Kenyan politician. Currently he is the Chairperson of the Higher Education Loans Board (HELB). He was elected as the first Speaker of the modern Kenyan Senate on 28 March 2013. From 1998 to 2013 he served as a Member of Parliament representing Turkana Central. He also served as the Assistant Minister for Planning and National Development from 1998 to 2002 under the government of President Daniel arap Moi. He was re-elected as Member of Parliament for Turkana Central in the 2007 general elections and steered the proceedings of the 10th Parliament in the position of acting Speaker of the House whenever the Speaker and the Deputy Speaker were absent.

== Early life, education and career ==
Born on 31 December 1963, Ethuro attended secondary school at Lodwar High School from 1978 to 1981. He is an alumnus of the Alliance High School, holds an MSc degree from the Clemson University, and a BSc degree from the University of Nairobi.

Before joining Parliament, Ethuro, an ardent soccer lover and member of the Bunge FC team, served as a deputy country representative for Oxfam and as a research scientist for the Kenya Agricultural Research Institute.

== Political life ==
Ethuro was first elected to Parliament as the Member for Turkana Central in the 1997 General Election, and has been re-elected three times, consecutively. He served as the Assistant Minister for Planning and National Development from 1998 to 2002 under President Moi's government, an appointment that came immediately after his first election to Parliament.

Apart from the acting Speaker’s position, Ethuro featured in critical Parliamentary Select Committees of the House, top among them the Committees on the Constitution, the Budget Committee, and the Constituency Development Fund (CDF) Committee. He was among key members of Parliament that actively and successfully mid-wifed the Constitution, and served as a member of the Constitution Implementation Oversight Committee.

He has served as the chairperson of the parliamentary committee on CDF for two terms of Parliament from 2002 to 2012.

Ethuro played an active role in the Amani Forum — a Great Lakes regional parliamentary peace initiative that mobilised MPs and involved them in peace forums following the 2007 post-election violence and stalemate that came about from the presidential election result, which was disputed by ODM. As the chairman of the forum, and with the facilitation of Parliament, he convened an urgent meeting of MPs and dispatched various teams to the grassroots to preach peace, an initiative that contributed to calming down the political temperatures at the time.

He has also served as a member of the Procedures Committee, which deals with the Standing Orders of Parliament.

== Baragoi Massacre ==
In 2012, Ethuro and three other members of parliament from Turkana county were summoned by the CID director to shed some light on what they knew about the murder of 41 police officers in Suguta Valley. Along with Turkana South MP Josephat Nanok, Ekwe Ethuro was charged with incitement to violence, becoming the second set of leaders to be put in the dock over the Baragoi killings. They appeared before chief magistrate Waweru Kiarie but did not plead to the charge, claiming it was a violation of their rights and an abuse of the judicial system.

The two MPs were released on a cash bail awaiting a ruling on whether to refer the matter to the High Court. The court later dismissed the incitement case against the two Members of Parliament. Chief magistrate Waweru Kiarie ruled that the charges preferred against Turkana South MP Josphat Nanok and his Turkana Central counterpart David Ekwe Ethuro were defective. Through lawyers Katwa Kigen and Jotham Arwa, the legislators claimed that the charges raised constitutional issues and asked the magistrate to suspend the plea and refer the matter to the High Court for interpretation.

== Speaker of the Senate ==
The Jubilee coalition won a majority in the Senate during the 2013 general elections, with 30 seats. During his victory speech, Ethuro promised to uphold the rule of law and offer stewardship leadership. He also paid tribute to the pioneer Senators of post-independence, promising to look up to them for inspiration, guidance and advice.

Ethuro was unanimously chosen by the Jubilee coalition as their nominee for Speaker after former Speaker of Parliament Francis ole Kaparo stepped down in his favour. Ethuro won the elections for Speaker of the Senate with the backing of the Jubilee coalition, managing 38 votes against CORD's Farah Maalim's 29 votes in the second round of voting. In the first round of voting, Ethuro garnered 35 votes, which was less than the two-thirds needed for a win, while Farah got 31 votes, Omondi had one vote and there was one spoilt vote.

On 31 August 2017 Kenneth Lusaka who had lost the Bungoma county gubernatorial race (and was until then the incumbent governor) was elected speaker of the Senate. Lusaka received 42 to NASA candidate Farah Maalim 25 votes, while Ethuro received only two votes. This effectively put an end to Ethuro's term as senate speaker.
