= South Imenti Constituency =

Kenyan electoral constituency

South Imenti
- constituency for the Parliament of Kenya
- South Imenti Constituency within Meru County

- Meru County within Kenya
- County: Meru
- Population: 206,506
- Area: 418 km^{2} (161.4 sq mi)

Current constituency
- Number of members: 1
- Party: JP
- Member of Parliament: Shadrack Mwiti Ithinji
- Wards: 6

South Imenti is an electoral constituency in Kenya. It is one of nine constituencies of Meru County. It has six wards, all of which elect councillors for the Meru Central County Council. The constituency was established for the 1988 elections.

South Imenti was one of three constituencies of the former Meru Central District.

== Members of Parliament ==
Elections	MP	Party	Notes
1988	Gilbert Kabeere Mbijjewe	KANU	One-party system.
1992	Kiraitu Murungi	FORD-K	
1997	Kiraitu Murungi	DP	
2002	Kiraitu Murungi	NARC	
2007	Kiraitu Murungi	PNU	
2013	Kathuri Murungi	TNA	
2017	Kathuri Murungi	Independent	
2022	Dr Shadrack Mwiti Ithinji	JP	

== Wards ==
There are 6 wards in South Imenti Constituency: Nkuene, Abogeta East, Abogeta West, Igoji East, Igoji West, and Mitunguu. As of 2022, there are 115,642 registered voters.

Ward	Registered Voters
Abogeta East	21,169
Abogeta West	19,074
Igoji West	12,496
Igoji East	18,203
Mitunguu	14,078
Nkuene	30,622
Total	115,642
*As of 2022
