= Kathuri Murungi =

Kenyan deputy senate speaker

Senator Kathuri Murungi

Deputy Speaker of the Senate of Kenya
- Incumbent
- Assumed office 8 September 2022
- President: William Ruto
- Preceded by: Margaret Kamar

Senator for Meru County
- Incumbent
- Assumed office 2022

Member of Parliament for South Imenti Constituency
- In office 2013–2022
- Preceded by: Kiraitu Murungi
- Succeeded by: Shadrack Mwiti

Personal details
- Party: United Democratic Alliance (UDA)
- Other political affiliations: The National Alliance (TNA) (2013–2017)
- Education: Egerton University
- Profession: Politician
- Known for: Deputy Speaker of the Senate of Kenya

Kathuri Murungi is a Kenyan politician and senator for Meru County currently serving as deputy senate speaker of the Kenyan Senate. Previously, he was a member of the lower house of parliament of Kenya for South Imenti Constituency. He is rated by Politrack Africa as the second best performing senator with a percentage point of 72.8.

== Education and career ==
Kathuri Murungi studied natural resources management at Egerton University, Njoro Campus from 1994 to 1998. On campus, he trained in martial art for self-defense stating that in a multi-party politics era, anyone could attack you.

He was elected to the Kenyan lower house of parliament for South Imenti Constituency on the ticket of The National Alliance (TNA) party and with the support of Jubilee Coalition in 2013 and reelected in 2017 as an independent candidate. In the 11th parliament of Kenya (2013 – 2017), Murungi served on the house committee on Environment and Natural Resources. He was elected to the senate from Meru County on the ticket of United Democratic Alliance (UDA) in 2022. On 8 September 2022, he was elected deputy senate speaker unchallenged following the withdrawal of senator Stewart Madzayo from Kilifi County. Politrack Africa rates Murungi as the second-best performing senator with 72.8 per cent coming behind Senator Enoch Wambua of Kitui County as the best performing senator with 73.2 per cent.
