= Olekina Ledama =

Kenyan politician

Ledama Olekina is a Kenyan politician who serves as the senator for Narok County. Olekina was elected on an Orange Democratic Movement ticket in the 8 August 2017, general elections in Kenya. He was born and raised in Oloombokishi, a small village near Narok, Kenya, on 11 November 1974. As of 2020, he resides in Eor Ekule, Enkanasa Village. Olekina was educated at Narok High School and thereafter proceeded to the United States where he earned a Bachelor of Arts Degree in Political Science and English Communication from The University of Massachusetts in Boston in 2002. He is the founder of Maasai Education Discovery, an education center for girls. Olekina has been involved in efforts to conserve the Mau Forest in Kenya. His sister, Lilian Seenoi-Barr, is a councillor on Derry City and Strabane District Council in Ireland, and served as Mayor of Derry City and Strabane from 2024 to 2025.
