= Golich Juma Wario =

Kenyan politician

Honourable Golich Juma Wario Senator

Member of the Kenyan Parliament
- Incumbent
- Assumed office August 2017

Golich Juma Wario is a Kenyan politician. He is the immediate former senator who represented Tana River County.
