= Julius Muthamia =

Kenyan politician, businessman (?-2015)

Julius Muthamia (1933/34 – October 7, 2015) was a Kenyan businessman and former politician who represented Meru in the original Senate of Kenya from its establishment in 1963 until its abolition in 1966. He subsequently served in the Parliament of Kenya, where he was Assistant Minister for Agriculture and Livestock Development in the government of Daniel arap Moi.

He also served as the chairman of the traditional Njuri Ncheke council, of the Horticultural Development Authority, and of the Uchumi supermarket chain.

Muthamia died at the age of 81 on October 7, 2015.
