= Emma Getrude Mbura =

Kenyan Politician

- Citizenship: Kenya
- Occupation: Politician
- Political party: The National Alliance (TNA)
- Movement: Jubilee Alliance

Emma Getrude Mbura (Emma Mbura Getrude) is a Kenyan politician, a former member of Parliament and a member of The National Alliance (TNA) political party.

== Career ==
Mbura was a member of the 11th Kenyan Parliament from 28 March 2013 to 8 August 2018. She represented Changamwe County as a representative of the TNA party. She was a member of the Parliamentary Seasonal Committee on Implementation. Emma Mbura made a total of 87 speeches during her term in the 11th Parliament of Kenya.

She has been a member of The National Alliance (TNA) party since 2012 and also a coalition member of Jubilee Alliance since 2012.
