= Stewart Madzayo =

Kenyan politician

Honourable Stewart Madzayo Senator

Member of the Kenyan Parliament
- Incumbent
- Assumed office August 2017

Personal details
- Party: ODM

Stewart Madzayo is a Kenyan politician. He is the current senator representing Kilifi County.

As of 2026, he serves as the minority leader of the Senate under the Orange Democratic Movement party.
