= Adan Dullo Fatuma =

Kenyan politician

Fatuma Adan Dullo is a Kenyan politician and the current elected Senator for Isiolo County as well as the shortest serving Minority Whip. She once served as the Deputy Majority Leader – Senate of the Republic of Kenya. Fatuma Dullo made history after being among the first three female senators to be elected as well as the only one from the Northeastern Region. She is a lawyer and an Advocate of the High Court of Kenya and previously served in various capacities in the public sector and in civil society. Her expertise is in public administration, governance and human rights advocacy. Her interests include human rights and education particularly of marginalised groups (indigenous peoples, women, children, youth, and people living with disabilities), community mobilisation and capacity-building.

== Education ==
Dullo attended the Administration Police Training College in Embakasi, undertaking the Administrative Officer Course in 1989 as well as the Paramilitary Training (Administrative) Course in 1993. She obtained a Bachelor of Laws (LL.B) degree from The University of Nairobi in 2003 and later completed a Post-Graduate Diploma in Law (Advocates Training Programme) at the Kenya School of Law. Dullo was admitted as an Advocate of the High Court of Kenya in 2006. She subsequently pursued and completed a Master of Laws (LL.M-Governance) degree in 2011 at The University of Nairobi.

== Career ==
Fatuma Adan Dullo has had a long career in public administration and public service. Upon completing her paramilitary training, she became one of the youngest serving District Officers, having been posted to Lamu in 1989 at just 22 years of age. She was later transferred to Embu in 1990 before being promoted to Administrative Officer in 1994. Dullo proceeded to serve as an Assistant Secretary / Legal Officer at the Ministry of Health in 1995. In 2006, she worked as a Legal Advisor at the United Nations Development Programme (UNDP)-Kenya and was attached to the National Council for Persons with Disabilities (NCPWD). Whilst at UNDP, Hon. Dullo participated in the enforcement of Section 24 of the Disability Act regarding Adjustment Orders as well as the establishment of the National Development Fund as per the Disability Act. She was later appointed as a Commissioner at the Kenya National Commission on Human Rights (KNCHR) in 2007. She gave policy and strategic direction and mainstreamed children rights, disability rights and women rights in the commission. She also provided leadership to the Security Sector Reform Programme.

== Senator ==
Fatuma Dullo was nominated as a Senator by the United Republican Party (URP) in 2013. During her time as Senator in the 11th Parliament (2013 – 2017), she served as Chairperson of the Select Committee to Inquire Into Policy and Legislation on the Treatment of Detained Persons in Correctional Facilities in Kenya; Vice-chair of the National Security and Foreign Relations Committee; and member of the Legal Affairs and Human Rights Committee. Following the 2017 General Elections, Fatuma Dullo was elected Senator on a Party for Development and Reform (PDR) ticket to represent Isiolo County. She was the only woman contestant in the tightly contested race. She was subsequently elected by the majority coalition to serve as Deputy Leader of Majority in the Senate, a position she has held since 2013. During the 12th Parliament, Fatuma Dullo promoted the interests of Isiolo County and special interest groups. She conducted oversight over national revenue allocated to counties as well as state officers and state departments particularly as a Member of the County Public Accounts and Investments Committee. As Deputy Leader of Majority she succeeded in setting the House's legislative agenda as well as lobbying members in a bid to promote party interests. She is described as a team player and good manager by her peers.

== Awards ==
12 December 2015 – The First Class: Chief of the Order of the Burning Spear

11 December 2015 – Mzalendo's People's Shujaaz Awards - Wanjiku's Best Representative – Security
