= Dorothy Nditi =

Kenyan politician

Dorothy Nditi or Dorothy Nditi Muchungu (born 1973) is a Kenyan politician. She is the immediate former Deputy Governor in Embu County Kenya.

== Education ==
She holds a bachelor of arts in home economics from Kenyatta University and she is currently studying for her master's degree in nutrition and dietetics.
