= Githu Muigai =

Kenyan lawyer and politician

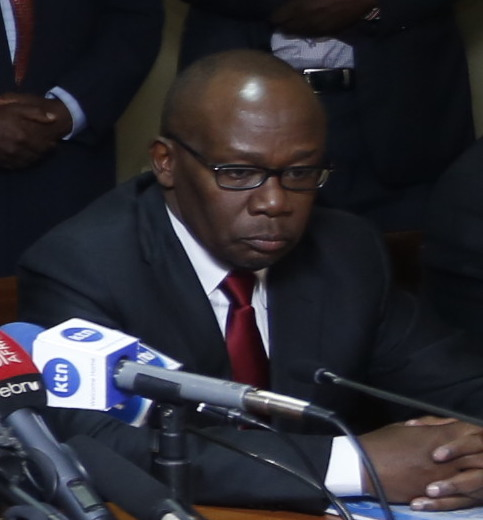

Attorney General of Kenya
- In office 27 August 2011 – 13 February 2018
- Appointed by: Mwai Kibaki; Uhuru Kenyatta
- Preceded by: Amos Wako
- Succeeded by: Paul Kihara Kariuki

Professor, School of Law, University of Nairobi

Personal details
- Born: 31 January 1960 (age 66) Pumwani hospital, Pumwani, Nairobi, Colony and Protectorate of Kenya
- Spouse: Margaret Waringa Muigai
- Children: Three
- Parent: James Stanley Muigai (father)
- Education: Columbia University (LL.M); University of Nairobi (PhD)
- Profession: Law

Githu Muigai (born 31 January 1960) is a Kenyan lawyer who was the Attorney General of the Republic of Kenya from 2011 until 13 February 2018, when he resigned.

== Education ==
He holds a bachelor's degree in law from the University of Nairobi, a master's degree in international law from Columbia University School of Law, and was awarded a doctoral degree in law in November 2002.

== Career ==
Prior to becoming Attorney General Githu Muigai served in the defunct Constitution of Kenya Review Commission and at the United Nations as Special Rapporteur on contemporary forms of racism, racial discrimination, xenophobia and related intolerance.

== 2013 Kenya presidential election petition ==
When the first round of the presidential election took place on 4 March 2013, Uhuru Kenyatta was declared the president-elect of Kenya by the Independent Electoral and Boundaries Commission. Raila Odinga challenged this in the Supreme Court of Kenya.

He was allowed by the court to be amicus curiae. In his presentation he told the court that the constitution is not clear on what "fresh elections" would entail. He further stated that that if court declare the voters register as having substantial defects as the petition is asking them to, it may mean that the legality of the elections for senators, governors and other elective posts may be questioned since they were elected using the same registers. Although he was meant to be a non-partisan friend of the court, some believed his submissions were biased towards the winning party. The court dismissed Raila Odinga's petition on 30 March 2013.

== Life after public office ==
He began teaching law at the University of Nairobi 2019 after resigning as the Attorney General. He was promoted to full professorship in 2019.

In 2021, President Uhuru Kenyatta appointed him as the non-executive chairman of the Council of Legal Education. A position he was forced to resign from in October 2023 after some utterances a week prior in a National Dialogue Committee forum, criticizing the number of representatives in the Kenyan Legislature, among other raised issues.
