= Jackson Mandago =

Kenyan politician

Senator of Uasin Gishu County
- Incumbent
- Assumed office 8 September 2022

Governor of Uasin Gishu County
- In office 2013 – 22 August 2022
- Preceded by: Inaugural Holder

Personal details
- Born: 5 May 1974 (age 51) Kenya
- Party: Jubilee Party of Kenya
- Spouse: Lucy Mandago

Jackson Kiplagat Arap Mandago is a Kenyan politician who currently serves as the senator of Uasin Gishu County. He served as the first Governor of Uasin Gishu County from 2013-2022. He was first elected Governor in 2013 and re-elected in 2017 for his second and final term.

== Education ==
Mandago joined Kenyatta University and pursued a bachelor's degree in biochemistry. He later joined the Catholic University of Eastern Africa (CUEA) to pursue procurement and strategic planning.In his tenure as a governor, he introduced an airlift study programme with aim to transform lives in his county.The programme went down after his staff allegedly misused the funds and is now to carry the blame.

On Wednesday 15 August 2023, a Kenyan court issued an arrest warrant for Jackson Mandago. According to the arrest warrant, Mandago, together with three officials, has conspired to embezzle up to one billion Kenyan shillings, or about eight million euros, from Kenyan youths and their families studying in Finland and Canada. However, Uasin Gishu County will maintain the controversial Finland education and jobs programme, in spite of scandals, Deputy Governor John Barorot has said.
