= Kenya Shipyards Limited =

Kenyan parastatal company

- Type: Military parastatal
- Industry: Ship building, repairs and maintenance
- Founded: 2020
- Headquarters: near Kenya Navy Base Mtongwe, Mombasa, Kenya
- Key people: Paul Otieno, Managing director Peter Muthungu, Deputy Managing Director
- Products: Ships & Boats
- Parent: Ministry of Defence
- Website: www.kenyashipyards.co.ke

The Kenya Shipyards Limited (KSL) is a state-owned corporation in Kenya. It is a limited liability parastatal company, under the Kenya Ministry of Defence. The company was created by Executive Order CAB/GEN.3/1/1 (60), on 14 August 2020. The primary objective of KSL is to build, repair and service water vessels (ships and boats) of the Kenyan Navy. A secondary objective is to carry out the same function for the Kenyan and regional private sector. A tertiary objective is to build, repair and service ships and boats for the regional governments. The company was incorporated and registered on 29 September 2020 with the Kenya Ministry of Finance as the 100 percent owner. KSL was commissioned to start commercial operations in June 2021.

== Location ==
According to the company website, the company headquarters are located adjacent to the Mtongwe Naval Base in the city of Mombasa, on the coast of the Indian Ocean. The company also maintains a smaller shipbuilding facility in the city of Kisumu, on the shores of Lake Victoria. In addition KSL maintains administrative offices in the capital city of Nairobi.

== Operations ==
=== Mombasa ===
The KSL shipyard in Mombasa became operational in December 2021. It is reported to be capable of handling ships weighing in excess of 4,000 tonnes (4,409 tons) and measuring up to 150 metres (492 ft) in length. The shipyard has two ship building hangars. The first one measures 150 meters (492 ft) in length and is 30 metres (98 ft) in height. The second hangar is 120 metres (394 ft) in length, 13 metres (43 ft) in width and 20 metres (66 ft) in height.

Benefits include savings on maintenance of Kenyan naval vessels, numbering 17 as of 2021, which have to undergo perioding overhaul every 10 years at an average cost of US$6,800 each. Before 2021, the maintenance was performed either in the Netherlands or in Spain. Kenya also expects to earn income from servicing some of the international maritime fleet, 40 percent of which is estimated to sail past the Kenyan coast annually.

=== Kisumu ===
In Kisumu, in western Kenya, on the shores of Lake Victoria, KSL has established a shipyard to build ships, boats and tugs to serve the countries surrounding Africa's largest freshwater lake. The first ship built here is MV Uhuru II of Kenya.

In February 2022, KSL (Kisumu) received orders for six new ships from both Tanzania and Uganda. In addition, the Kenyan private sector had ordered 11 vessels as of then, bringing the order backlog to 17 ships.

KSL has partnered with the Damen Shipyards Group, from the Netherlands in its operations, both in Mombasa and Kisumu.

== See also ==
- Kenya Defence Forces
- National Enterprise Corporation
