= Enoch Kiio Wambua =

Kenyan politician

Enoch Wambua

Senator of Kitui County
- Incumbent
- Assumed office 31 August 2017
- Preceded by: David Musila

Personal details
- Born: 31 October 1972 (age 53)
- Party: Wiper Patriotic Front
- Education: Moi University (B.Ed.)
- Occupation: Legislator; journalist

Enoch Kiio Wambua (born 31 October 1972) is a Kenyan senator representing Kitui County.

== Education ==
Wambua studied journalism and graduated from Moi University with a Bachelor of Education degree in English and Literature in 1996. He also holds a Diploma in Planning and Management of Development Studies from the Catholic University of Eastern Africa and a Postgraduate Diploma in American Studies from Smith College, Massachusetts, which he pursued between 2007 and 2008.

== Career ==
=== Journalism ===
Wambua began his career in journalism in October 1999 as a trainee sub-editor at Kenya Times Media. He later served as a sub-editor at the organization from February 2000 to April 2005. In May 2005, he joined Nation Media Group as a sub-editor and worked there until July 2013, later holding the position of associate editor. In September 2013, he served as managing editor at The Standard, and from September 2015 to December 2016 he worked as a senior editor at the same organization. He thereafter resigned in order to vie for an elective post in the government.

=== Active politics ===
In the 2017 Kenyan general election, Wambua was elected Senator for Kitui County on a Wiper Democratic Movement ticket, succeeding David Musila. He was re-elected in the 2022 general election on the same party ticket, securing a second term in the Senate. He serves as a member of the Senate County Public Accounts Committee and the Senate Roads, Transportation and Housing Committee.

During his tenure, he sponsored the Mung Beans Bill, 2022, which proposed increased regulation of the sector. The bill attracted public and parliamentary debate and was later dropped.

== See also ==
- Wiper Democratic Movement
