= John Nderitu =

Kenyan politician

Senator the Honourable John Nderitu

Member of the Kenyan Parliament
- Incumbent
- Assumed office August 2017

John Nderitu is a Kenyan politician. He is the current senator for Laikipia County.

== Education ==
Nderitu went to Kiamariga Primary School for his KCPE and Gatero Secondary School. He furthered his education at University of Nairobi, where he acquired a BSC, Chemistry and Botany.

== Career ==
Nderitu was employed by the Microlabs Pharmaceutical Company as a Medical Representative. In 2007, he left the job for other roles in politics, including Laikipia County Councilor.
