= Kennedy Mong'are Okong'o =

Kenyan politician

Hon. Kennedy Mong'are Okong'o

Immediate former Member of the Kenyan Senate
- In office March 2013 – 2017

Member of the Kenyan Senate

Personal details
- Born: 1 March 1969 (age 57) Sironga, Nyamira County
- Party: FORD KENYA
- Education: Devi Ahilya Vishwavidyalaya (Political Science)
- Occupation: Politician

Kennedy Mong'are Okong'o (born 1 March 1969) is the first and immediate former Senator of Nyamira County, Kenya.
