= Agnes Zani =

Kenyan Politician, Sociologist and Academician

Agnes Philomena Zani
- Born: 1972 (age 53–54); Mombasa, Kenya
- Education: University of Nairobi (B.A., Sociology); University of Oxford (MPhil, DPhil
- Occupations: Politician, sociologist, academic
- Political party: Orange Democratic Movement (ODM)

Dr. Agnes Philomena Zani (born 1970) is a Kenyan politician, sociologist, and academic who is a member of the Orange Democratic Movement (ODM) political party.

== Early life ==
Agnes Zani was born in 1972 in Mombasa, Kenya, the second born in a family of three children. Her father is Zacharia Zani, and her mother is Teresa Zani, who were respected educators in the Coast Province. She grew up in Golini, Kwale County, an area that was often described as marginalized, which shaped her passion for social justice and equality.

== Education background ==
Zani holds a Bachelor of Arts in Sociology from the University of Nairobi. She also holds a Master of Philosophy (MPhil) and a Doctor of Philosophy (DPhil) in Sociology from the University of Oxford in the United Kingdom.

== Career ==
She was a Senior Lecturer in the department of Sociology at the University of Nairobi from 1993 to 2013. Zani is also served as a Senior Researcher at PROSOWO project, her research studies focused on community developments and sociology of politics, she authored several research papers and contributed to scholary discourse on critical issues in Kenya and the broader African context.

== Political career ==
She served as an acting ODM Secretary General after the departure of Ababu Namwamba, a role in which she was shaping the party's policies and strategies. She was later nominated by the ODM party to serve as a Senator in Parliament from 21st March 2013 to 16th July 2017. As a Senator, she was an Advocate for policy reforms in education and social development.

She served several parliamentary committees, such as the Senate Committee on Education, as Vice Chairperson. She was also a coalition member of the Coalition for Reforms and Democracy from 2012 to 2017.

== Publications ==
- Wairire, Gidraph; Agnes P, Zani (19 October 2015). The Role of Social Work in Poverty Reduction and Realization of MDGs in Kenya. Nairobi University Press. ISBN 978-9966-792-52-5.
