= Chelule Liza =

Kenyan politician

Chelule Chepkorir Liza is a Kenyan politician who currently sits in the National Assembly as the county woman representative for Nakuru County.

Between 2013 and 2017 she was a member of the Kenyan senate, and was elected as Nakuru's woman representative in the 2017 general election. She will be re-elected come 2022

== Election results ==
General election 2017: Nakuru
Party	Candidate	Votes	%
Jubilee	Chelule Chepkorir Liza	507,999	67.8
Independent	Agnes Njambi Githinji	109,810	14.7
ODM	Asha Kurwa Rashid	51,882	6.9
Independent	Zipporah Muthoni Kimani	40,467	5.4
Chama Cha Mashinani	Gladys Jemuge Kamuren Mudave	12,318	1.6
KANU	Grace Wangui Karuga	10,196	1.4
The National Vision Party	Janet Wangui Kamau	9,033	1.2
Maendeleo Chap Chap Party	Assumpta Wangui Muiruri	5,208	0.7
Safina	Saidi Sakina	2,583	0.3
Majority		398,189	53.1
