= George Khaniri =

Kenyan politician

Senator of Vihiga County
- In office 28 March 2013 – 9 August 2022
- Preceded by: New position
- Succeeded by: Godfrey Osotsi

Member of the Kenyan Parliament
- In office 1996–2007
- Preceded by: Nicodemus Newton Khaniri
- Succeeded by: Charles Gimose
- Constituency: Hamisi

Personal details
- Born: George Munyasia; 1 July 1973 (age 52) Hamisi sub county in Vihiga County
- Party: Amani National Congress (ANC)
- Spouse: Eunice Jelagat
- Children: Ivy, Shirley, Newton, George Khaniri Jr.
- Occupation: Politician
- Profession: Economist
- Cabinet: Former assistant minister

George Khaniri is a Kenyan politician. He belongs to the Amani National Congress (ANC) and was first elected to represent the Hamisi Constituency in the National Assembly of Kenya in the 1996 by election after his father's ( the late hamisi MP Hon. Khaniri Snr) demise. He retained the seat in the following elections in 1997, 2002, and 2007. He then won in 2013 as Vihiga county senator after the creation of the two tire government following the 2010 new constitution.
