= Billow Kerow =

Kenyan politician (born 1958)

Billow Kerrow (born 1958 in Rhamu) is a Kenyan politician from Mandera County. He served as a Member of Parliament for Mandera Central Constituency from 2002 to 2007 and as the first senator from Mandera County from 2013 to 2017. Kerrow also served as KANU's shadow finance minister in the ninth parliament, and as the Chairperson of the Standing Committee on Finance, Commerce and Budget in the Senate. In February 2016, Kerrow replaced Senator Kipchumba Murkomen as a member of the Pan-African Parliament. In 2017, Billow Kerrow decided to retire from politics after 15 years saying it is "an appropriate time to re-evaluate and move on".
