= Charles Keter =

Kenyan politician

Honourable Charles Cheruiyot Keter
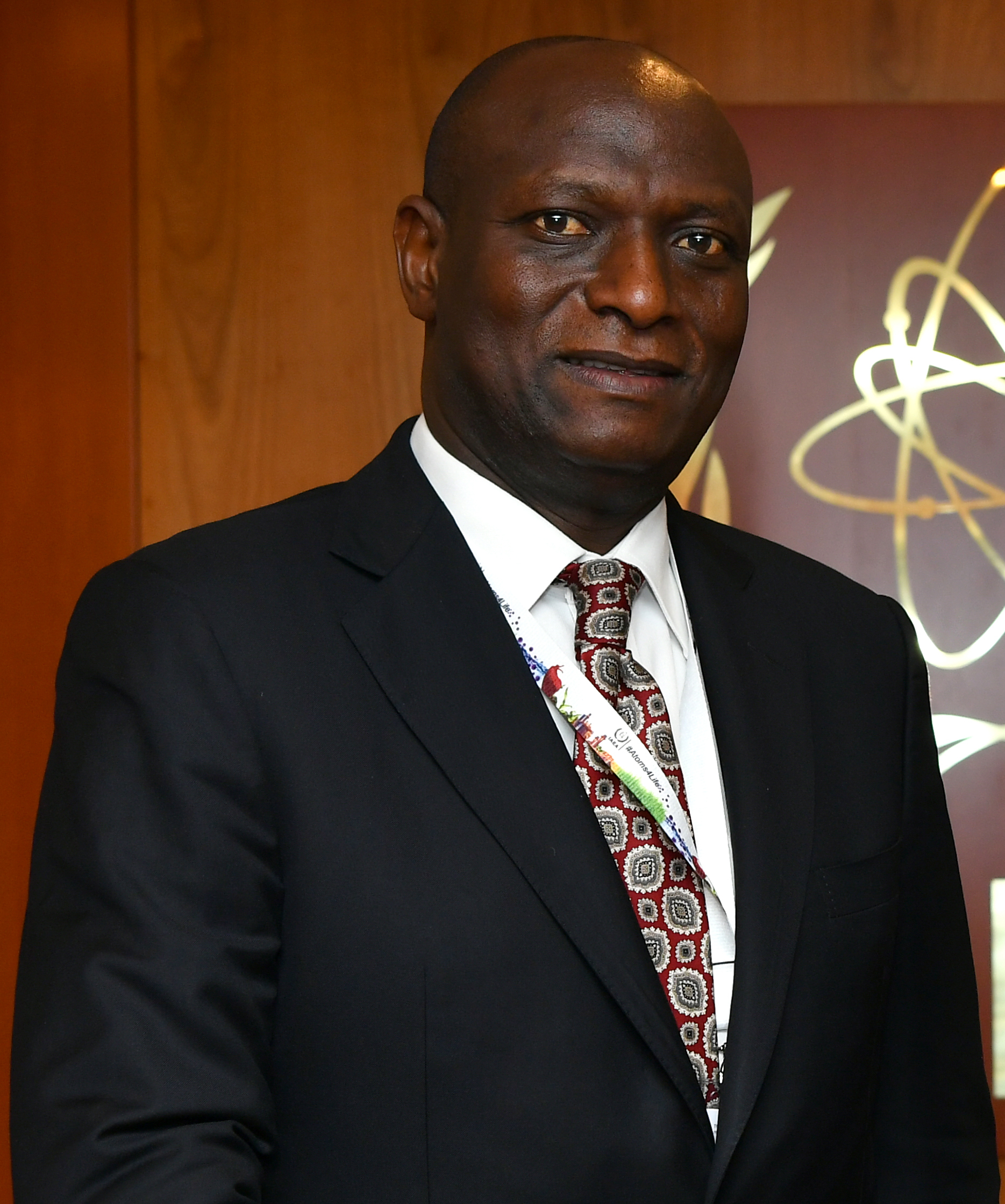
- Charles Keter in 2018

3rd Cabinet Secretary for Devolution
- In office 2021–2022
- President: Uhuru Kenyatta
- Preceded by: Eugene Wamalwa

18th Cabinet Secretary for Energy & Petroleum
- In office 2015–2021
- President: Uhuru Kenyatta
- Preceded by: Kiraitu Murungi
- Succeeded by: Monica Juma

2nd Senator
- In office 2013–2015
- Preceded by: James K Arap Soi
- Succeeded by: Aaron Cheruiyot
- Constituency: Kericho County

8th Member of the Kenyan Parliament
- In office 2002–2013
- Preceded by: Charles D. K. arap Kirui
- Succeeded by: Erick Mlimani Keter
- Constituency: Belgut

Personal details
- Born: Charles Cheruiyot Keter; 22 November 1969 (age 56) Kericho, Kenya.
- Citizenship: Kenya
- Party: UDA
- Other political affiliations: KANU (before 2005); ODM (2005–2012); URP (2012–2016); JP (2016–2022)
- Spouse: Winnie Keter
- Children: 3
- Education: Kenyatta University, Nairobi.; United States International University, Nairobi.
- Occupation: Politician
- Website: www.charlesketer.com

Charles Cheruiyot Keter (born 22 November 1969) is a Kenyan politician. He has belonged to the United Democratic Alliance Party of Kenya (UDA) since 2022.

== Career ==
From 1993 to 1994, Keter worked as a systems analyst at Telkom Kenya. He performed well and was then promoted to a position of assistant manager of the anti-fraud section.

Keter began his political career in 2002 when he contested for a parliamentary seat and won to represent the people of Belgut Constituency in the National Assembly of Kenya.

Keter joined the Orange Democratic Movement in 2007 and was elected for the second time as MP for Belgut in the National Assembly in the December 2007 parliamentary election. From 2008 to 2013, he was Assistant Minister of Energy in addition to representing his people in Parliament.

In 2013 he ran for the senatorial seat for Kericho County on a URP ticket under the Jubilee Coalition led by Uhuru Kenyatta. Keter won to become the first senator for Kericho County in 2013 since the independence of Kenya, a position that he held till he was named the Cabinet Secretary for Energy and Petroleum under Kenyatta. In 2015 he became Kenya's energy minister (Cabinet Secretary for Energy & Petroleum). He was moved to the Ministry of Devolution in 2021 in a reshuffle. He resigned in February 2022 to venture into elective politics in his Rift Valley's backyard.

== Personal life ==
Charles Keter is married to Winnie Keter and they have children. Their younger daughter Daisy graduated with a master's degree in Commercial and Corporate Law LL.M from the Queen Mary University.
