= Amos Wako =

Attorney General of Kenya from 1991 to 2011

The Honourable Amos Wako FCIArb
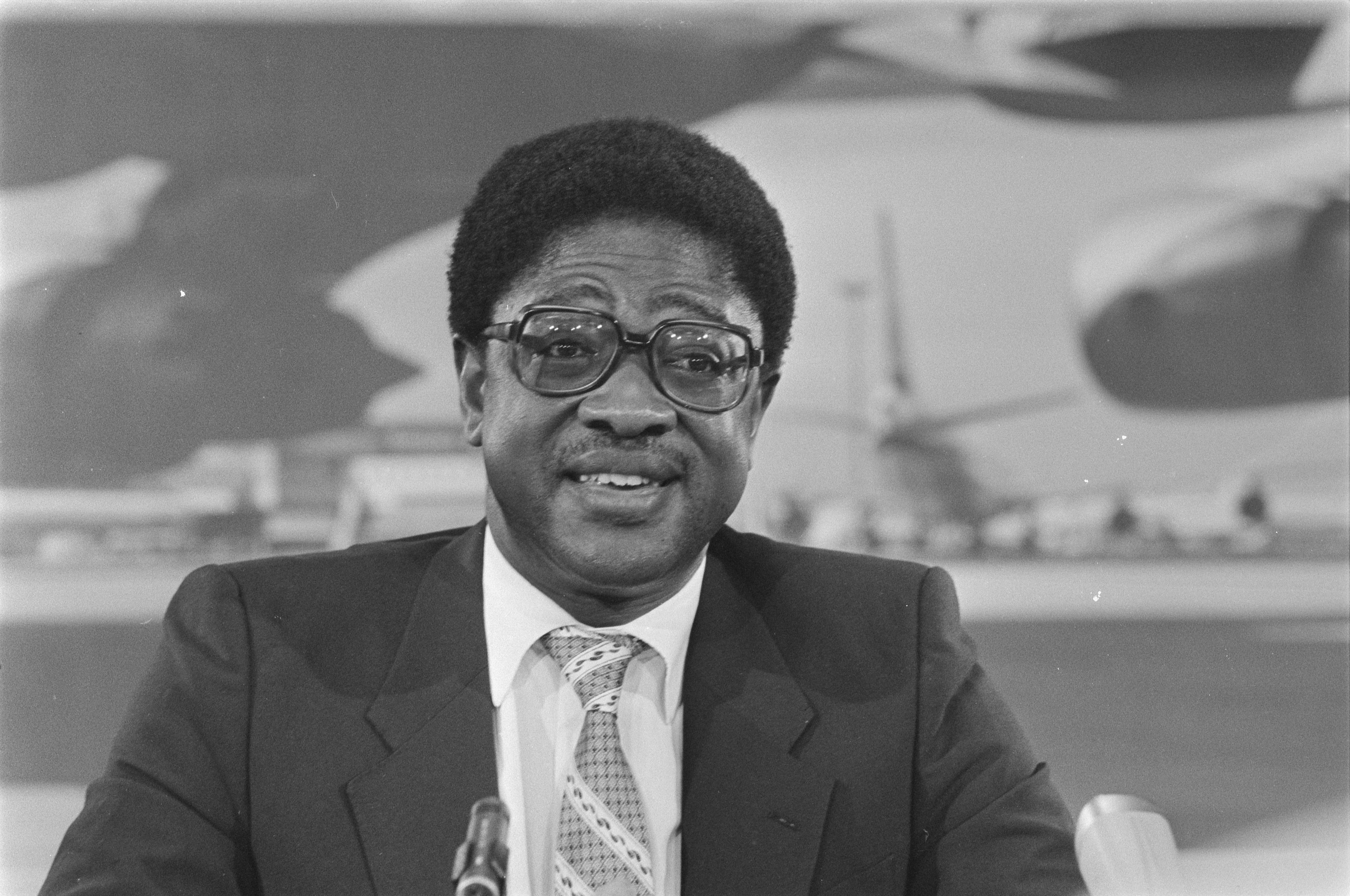
- Wako (1984)

Deputy Chairman of the Committee of Constitutional Experts for Drafting the EAC Political Federation Constitution
- Incumbent
- Assumed office September 2018
- Appointed by: Uhuru Kenyatta
- Chairman: Benjamin Josses Odoki

Senator of Busia County
- In office 28 March 2013 – 8 September 2022
- Preceded by: Office established
- Succeeded by: Okiya Omutata

4th Attorney General of Kenya
- In office 13 May 1991 – 26 August 2011
- Appointed by: Daniel arap Moi
- Preceded by: Mathew Guy Muli
- Succeeded by: Githu Muigai

Personal details
- Born: 31 July 1945 (age 81) Kenya Colony
- Party: ODM
- Domestic partner: Philomena Mwilu (1997–present)
- Children: 2
- Education: UDSM (LLB); Uni. of London (BSc), (LLM)
- Occupation: Politician
- Profession: Lawyer

Amos Wako (born 31 July 1945) is a former Attorney General of Kenya and the first senator for Busia County from 2013 to 2022. Wako currently serves as Deputy Chairman of the Committee of Constitutional Experts for Drafting the EAC Political Federation Constitution, the committee drafting the constitution for the East African Confederation.

== Education ==
Wako was born in the Colony and Protectorate of Kenya. He was educated at Kakamega School, and the Alliance High School and earned a Bachelor of Science in Economics at the University of London, a Bachelor of Laws at the University College of Dar es Salaam, and a Master of Laws at the University of London.

== Legal career ==
He served in several professional organizations, including holding the position of Secretary General of the African Bar Association from 1978 to 1980, and as the first secretary general of the Inter-African Union of Lawyers. He is a member of the Faculty Board of Law at the University of Nairobi. Between 1985 and 1992, he was a member of the UN Human Rights Committee. He worked for Kaplan & Stratton from March 1969 and became a Partner from April 1972 to May 1991 when he was appointed Attorney General. Wako served as LSK chairman from 1979 to 1981. He was also held numerous positions in regional and global bodies dealing with constitutional and governance affairs.

=== Key roles ===
A lawyer by profession, Wako served as the Attorney General of Kenya for 20 years (from 13 May 1991 to 26 August 2011).

Amos Wako has been the Attorney General at a historic and transitional period in the history of Kenya. Some of the matters dealt with are:

Oversaw the transition from one party state to a multiparty democracy (December 1991) and from one Government to another through a free and fair election in which the ruling (KANU) was defeated by the opposition (NARC) (December 2002). Piloted through Parliament the necessary Constitutional amendments and legislation including providing for a multi-party democratic State and setting up of an independent Electoral Commission. Chaired National Constitutional Conferences consisting of Members of Parliament, religious leaders and representatives of the civil society. Member of the Constitution of Kenya Review Commission.

Drafted the proposed new Constitution of Kenya based on the Constitution of Kenya Bill as drafted by the National Constitutional Conference and as amended by Parliament. This was Draft constitution was nicknamed "the Wako Draft", but failed miserably at the 2005 Kenyan constitutional referendum.

He kept his position as Attorney General through the transition from Daniel arap Moi to Mwai Kibaki. He is dealing with the Goldenberg scandal, a long-running corruption scandal that has lasted his entire time as Attorney General.

=== Other roles ===
During his reign as the attorney general, Wako was an Advocate of the High Court of Kenya, a member of the International Commission of Jurists, Member Council of Legal Education, was a Member Council of International Bar Association. Legal Advisor to Young men Christian Association (Y.M.C.A.) and Kenya Boy Scouts Association. Member Faculty Board of Law, University of Nairobi Member, O.A.U. Committee of experts on the O.A.U. charter Review Committee and African Charter on Human and Peoples Rights.

== Political career ==
Wako won the senatorial seat after defeating former minister of finance Chris Okemo. He won the senator seat on an Orange Democratic Movement (ODM) being led by former Prime Minister Raila Odinga.

== Awards ==
In 1977, Wako was awarded fellow International Academy of Trial Lawyers, and in 1978 he was honoured as a lifetime member of Wiltshire Bar Association.

== USA travel bans ==
In October 2009 he was given a travel ban by the United S of America (USA) for 'deliberately blocking political reforms' following post-poll violence in 2008. Mr Amos Wako left the State Law Office on 26 August 2011 as per the new constitution which demanded him to leave office One year after its promulgation. He is Succeeded by Prof Githu Muigai. He joined the Orange Democratic Movement, on whose ticket he contested the Busia senate seat in the 4 March General Election.

On 18 November 2019, the US State Department announced that Amos Wako, his wife and child were barred for travel to the US due to significant corruption.

== See also ==
- Corruption in Kenya
- Philomena Mwilu
- Nerima Wako-Ojiwa
- Benjamin Josses Odoki
