= Zipporah Kittony =

Kenyan politician and activist

Hon Zipporah Jepchirchir Kittony
- Born: Zipporah Jepchirchir Chesire; 1943 (age 82–83); Trans Nzoia, Kenya
- Education: Kapsabet Girls High School
- Occupation: Chairlady
- Years active: 1996 - 2006
- Organization: Maendeleo ya Wanawake Organization
- Known for: Women's Rights Activism
- Notable work: Sheer Grit
- Political party: KANU
- Spouse: Paul Kittony
- Children: 3
- Parents: Isaiah Chesire (father); Elizabeth Chesire (mother)
- Honours: Order of the Golden Warrior, American Biographical Institute Woman of the Year

Zipporah Jepchirchir Kittony (born 1943), better known as Zipporah Kittony, is a former Kenyan politician and women's and children's rights activist. She served as nominated Member of Parliament between 1988 and 2007 and as a KANU nominated Senator between 2013 and 2018 . She also served as the Chairperson of the Maendeleo ya Wanawake Organization (MYWO) from 1996 to 2006.

== Early life and education ==
Kittony was born in 1943 in Kasoyo Village, Baringo County to Isaiah and Elizabeth Chesire. Her father was a Christian missionary and her brother, Reuben Chesire, was a Member of Parliament (MP) for Eldoret North from 1988 to 1997. She is the fifth of twelve siblings, nine sisters and three brothers.

Kittony started her education at Kapropita Primary School and proceeded to Kapsabet Girls High School for her secondary education. Upon completion of secondary school, she returned to Kapropita Primary School where she worked as an untrained teacher.

She left teaching in 1964 to join the Family Planning Association of Kenya where she trained Kericho women on family planning.

In the 1970s she was appointed to the World Assembly of Youth as the East and Central Africa Senior Programmes Officer. She quit this position in 1976 to focus on farming. In 1979 she was appointed the chairperson of the Agriculture Society of Kenya, Kericho.

Kittony served as chair of MYWO for Trans Nzoia Branch then later ascended to become the national chairperson of the organization.

== Political career ==
Her political career began in 1988 when she was nominated MP for Cherangany by then President Daniel arap Moi. She held this seat until 2007 when she decided to run for elective position as MP on a KANU ticket. She lost to Joshua Kutuny of the Orange Democratic Movement. In the 2013 elections, KANU nominated her as senator.

As a nominated senator, Kittony was opposed to the two thirds gender rule. She stated that there were more women than men in Kenya and thus the one third rule limited women to the positions they could take.

She retired from active politics in 2017.

== Personal life ==
She was married to Paul Kittony in 1962 with whom she has three children - two sons and a daughter. One of her sons, Kiprono Kittony, is the Chairman of the Nairobi Securities Exchange as well as Radio Africa Group.

She enjoys a close relationship with the Moi family. Former president Daniel arap Moi lived in the Chesire homestead in his younger years and it was Chesire who taught him about Christianity. Gideon Moi has attended her grandchildren's birthdays.

On 13 February 1976, her younger sister Esther Jeruto was taken by Ugandan authorities as she was boarding a plane to Kenya at the Entebbe International Airport. She was never seen again. At the time, Jeruto was a student at Makerere University.

She contacted COVID-19 in 2019 and was on a ventilator for more than a month.

She backed Raila Odinga in the 2022 Kenya General Elections.

At the burial of her brother Reuben, Kittony told the crowd that the deceased's family was waiting for an apology from then deputy president William Ruto for having slapped the late Chesire at the State House, Nairobi in 2002. Both Chesire and Ruto were vying for the position of MP, Eldoret North. Speaking at the burial, Kalonzo Musyoka dared Ruto to deny that he had slapped Chesire.

She released her memoir titled Sheer Grit in 2022.

After retiring from active politics, she is now a full-time farmer at her Sirwo Farm in Cherangany, Trans Nzoia, where she plants green and purple tea. Her farm holds the record for the highest single day factory produce in Kenya (1,912 kilogrammes)

Kittony was awarded Order of the Golden Warrior in 1998. In 1999, she was awarded the American Biographical Institute Woman of the Year.
