= Cleophas Malala =

Kenyan politician

Honourable Cleophas Wakhungu Malalah Senator

Former Member of the Kenyan Parliament
- Incumbent
- Assumed office August 2017

Personal details
- Education: USIU

Cleophas Wakhungu Malalah is a Kenyan politician and a lecturer. He is the immediate former senator of Kakamega County.

== Early life and education ==
Cleophas Wakhungu Malalah sat for his Kenya Certificate of Secondary Education at Friends school Kamusinga before proceeding to USIU where he got his Bachelor's Degree, and currently doing a masters.

== Political career ==
Malalah was elected senator of Kakamega County in the 2017 general election with the party ANC. In 2022, he vied for the governor of Kakamega county and lost to Fernandez Barasa. In 2023, he was appointed the secretary general of the United Democratic Alliance (Kenya) party. On 2 August 2024, Cleophas Malala was removed from the UDA Secretary General position.

== Scriptwriter ==
In 2025, Malala wrote a school play titles "Echoes of War" for Butere Girls High School in Kakamega County, Kenya. He is currently the deputy party leader of DCP party under Rigathi Gachagua. See https://ntvkenya.co.ke/news/gachagua-unveils-dcp-names-malala-deputy-party-leader/
