= Kiraitu Murungi =

Kenyan politician

Hon. Kiraitu Murungi EGH

Chairman of the National Oil Corporation of Kenya
- Incumbent
- Assumed office 2023
- Preceded by: Jane Njeri Wambui

Governor of Meru County
- In office 22 August 2017 – 25 August 2022
- Preceded by: Peter Munya
- Succeeded by: Kawira Mwangaza

Member of the Kenyan Senate
- In office 28 March 2013 – 8 August 2017
- Preceded by: Julius Muthamia
- Succeeded by: Mithika Linturi
- Constituency: Meru County

Minister of Energy
- In office 2008–2013
- President: Mwai Kibaki

Minister of Justice and Constitutional Affairs
- In office 2003–2005
- President: Mwai Kibaki

Member of Parliament for South Imenti
- In office 1992–2013

Personal details
- Born: 1 January 1952 (age 74) Kionyo Village, Kenya Colony
- Party: Jubilee Party
- Spouse: Priscilla Murungi
- Children: 4
- Education: University of Nairobi (LLB), (LLM); Harvard Law School; Kenya School of Law
- Profession: Lawyer
- Website: www.kiraitumurungi.com

Kìraitū Mūrungi (born 1 January 1952) is a Kenyan politician, lawyer, and civil rights advocate. He is the Chairman of the National Oil Corporation of Kenya. He has previously held roles including Governor of Meru County, Senator for Meru, and was a long-serving Member of Parliament for South Imenti Constituency. Over his extensive political career, he has also served as a Cabinet Minister and been instrumental in advocating for social justice and democratic reforms in Kenya.

== Early life and education ==
Kìraitū Mūrungi was born on 1 January 1952 in Kionyo Village, Meru District. He attended Kionyo Primary School, then Chuka High School, and Alliance High School. Murungi earned a Bachelor of Laws from the University of Nairobi in 1977 and later an LLM from the same university in 1982. In 1991, he completed a second LLM at Harvard Law School, where he studied during his exile in the United States.

== Career ==
=== Legal and advocacy work ===
Before entering politics, Mūrungi was a partner in a law firm he co-founded with Gibson Kamau Kuria and Aaron Ringera. The firm handled significant cases, notably representing political prisoners detained during Daniel arap Moi's presidency. Murungi became well known for his work in human rights and social justice, including representing Wanyiri Kihoro against the Kenyan government. His commitment to democratic reform continued during his time in exile, where he supported efforts for multi-party democracy in Kenya.

=== Political career ===
Mūrungi entered politics in the early 1990s, joining the Forum for the Restoration of Democracy (FORD) and later the Democratic Party (DP) as he advocated for multi-party democracy. He was elected as a Member of Parliament for South Imenti in 1992 and held this seat until 2013, aligning himself with reformist leaders and later joining the National Rainbow Coalition (NARC) in 2002. He held various cabinet roles, including Minister of Justice and Constitutional Affairs and later Minister of Energy.

In 2013, Mūrungi became the senator for Meru County, representing the county in the Kenyan Senate. In 2017, he successfully ran for Governor of Meru County under the Jubilee Party and served a five-year term.

After his term as governor, Mūrungi was appointed Chairman of the National Oil Corporation of Kenya in 2023, where he has been tasked with overseeing the strategic direction of Kenya’s national petroleum interests.

== Controversies ==
Mūrungi's political career has been marked by controversies. In 2005, he faced criticism for a remark perceived as trivializing both corruption and gender violence, for which he later apologized. Mūrungi was also implicated in the Anglo Leasing Scandal, an infamous corruption case in Kenya. In 2006, John Githongo, former Governance and Ethics Permanent Secretary, released recordings alleging that Mūrungi attempted to obstruct investigations. Although he denied the accusations, he resigned from his cabinet post to allow further investigation, later returning to his position as Minister of Energy.

== Legacy and personal life ==
Mūrungi has contributed to the development of South Imenti Constituency. He is married to Priscilla Mūrungi, and they have four children. Mūrungi has had a profound influence on Kenyan politics and governance, particularly in his advocacy for democratic reforms.

== See also ==
- Corruption in Kenya
- John Githongo
