= United Democratic Forum Party =

- Founded: 2012
- Dissolved: 2016
- Merged into: Jubilee Party
- Headquarters: Nairobi
- Ideology: Liberalism; Economic liberalism Humanism
- Political position: Centre
- National affiliation: Amani Coalition

The United Democratic Forum Party (UDF) was a political party in Kenya.

== History ==
The party was founded in 2012, by a cross section of younger members of Kenya's 10th parliament under the premise of steering reforms to Kenya's governance and boosting economic growth. Its members included Deputy Prime Minister Musalia Mudavadi.

Prior to the 2013 general elections the party joined the Amani Coalition, which nominated the Mudavadi as its presidential candidate. In the elections Mudavadi came third in the presidential contest with 4% of the vote, whilst the UDF won three seats in the Senate and twelve in the National Assembly.

In 2015 Mudavadi broke away from the UDF to form the Amani National Congress. In 2016 the party merged into the Jubilee Party.
