= Amani Coalition =

- Leader: Musalia Mudavadi
- Founded: 4 January 2013
- Political position: Centre
- Colours
- Coalition Partners: UDF; KANU; New Ford Kenya

The Amani Coalition was a political party alliance in Kenya.

== History ==
The alliance was established to support the candidacy of Musalia Mudavadi in the 2013 general elections. Its members were the United Democratic Forum Party (UDF), KANU and New Ford Kenya.
