= Alliance Party of Kenya =

Alliance Party Of Kenya
- Leader: Kiraitu Murungi
- Founded: 2012
- Dissolved: 2016
- National affiliation: Jubilee Alliance (2013)

The Alliance Party of Kenya (APK) was a political party in Kenya.

== History ==
The party was established by cabinet minister Kiraitu Murungi in 2012, in an attempt to create a vehicle for Uhuru Kenyatta to use in his bid to succeed President Mwai Kibaki. Kenyatta, however, opted to form his own party, The National Alliance. APK was not formally a part of the Jubilee Alliance, but it did support Kenyatta's bid in the 2013 presidential contest.

In 2016 the party merged into the Jubilee Party.
