= Orange Democratic Movement =

Political party in Kenya

- Abbreviation: ODM
- Leader: Oburu Odinga
- Chairperson: Gladys Wanga
- General Secretary: Catherine Omanyo (acting)
- Presidium: National Executive Committee of the Orange Democratic Movement
- Spokesperson: Philip Etale
- Deputy Secretary General: Agnes Zani
- Treasurer-General: Timothy Bosire
- Senate minority leader: Stewart Madzayo
- National Assembly minority leader: Junet Mohamed
- Founder: Raila Odinga
- Founded: 2005
- Headquarters: Nairobi, Kenya
- Newspaper: Chungwa
- Youth wing: ODM Youth League (OYL)
- Women Wing: ODM Women League (OWL)
- Veterans Wing: ODM Veterans League (OVL)
- Ideology: Social democracy Populism
- Political position: Centre-left
- National affiliation: Azimio La Umoja
- International affiliation: Liberal International
- African affiliation: Africa Liberal Network
- Colours: Orange; White; Blue
- Slogan: Chungwa Moja, Maisha Bora! One Orange, Better Life!
- Parliamentary Caucus: Orange Democratic Movement Caucus
- Party Conference: National Delegates Conference (NDC)
- National Assembly: 85 / 349
- Senate: 12 / 67
- EALA: 5 / 9
- Pan-African Parliament: 2 / 5
- Governors: 16 / 47
- Members of County Assemblies: 578 / 1,450

Election symbol
- Orange fruit

Website
- www.odm.co.ke

The Orange Democratic Movement (ODM) is a centre-left political party in Kenya. It is the successor of a grassroots people's movement that was formed during the 2005 Kenyan constitutional referendum campaign. This movement separated in August 2007 into the Orange Democratic Movement Party of Kenya and the Wiper Democratic Movement – Kenya (formerly the Orange Democratic Movement – Kenya, known as ODM–Kenya).

The name "orange" originates from the ballot cards in the referendum, in which the banana represented a "yes" vote, and the orange represented a "no" vote. Thus, the party demonstrates that it supported a no vote in the 2005 referendum. The original linchpins of the ODM were Uhuru Kenyatta's KANU party and the late Raila Odinga's LDP. While Kenyatta left KANU, Odinga remained and led ODM until his death in 2025. The party tends to be more popular among the Kenyan Luo people.

== 2005 constitutional referendum ==
In the 2005 Kenyan constitutional referendum, the "no" vote, which the ODM campaigned for, won with 58.12% of Kenyans voting down the proposed constitution. Following this, President Mwai Kibaki dismissed his entire cabinet. The response of the ODM was to say that this was a step in the right direction and to call for an immediate general election, claiming that the Kibaki regime, which had campaigned vigorously in favour of a yes vote in the referendum, had lost its mandate.

Kibaki's government resisted this; elections were not to be held until the last week of Kibaki's five-year constitutionally-mandated tenure. The ODM emerged as a major opposition party, along with KANU, and organized a number of rallies asking for elections and a new constitution. The ODM also protested against the Liberal Democratic Party (LDP), which opposed the referendum, being dropped from Kibaki's new cabinet.

== 2007 elections ==
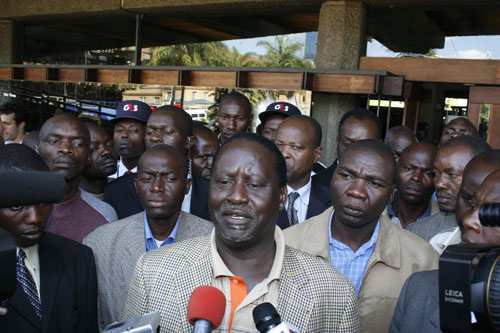
ODM leader Raila Odinga speaks with the Kenyan media during the 2007–08 Kenyan crisis.

After the 2002 elections, KANU was in opposition, while the LDP was a partner in the ruling NARC coalition until it was removed after the 2005 referendum. The LDP had supported no vote at the referendum, contrary to the policy of president Kibaki. Following their united stand in the referendum debate and responding to a threat by the newly formed Narc-Kenya party the leaders of KANU, LDP and some smaller parties decided to campaign jointly for the upcoming 2007 Kenya general election. They forming the Orange Democratic Movement, which was named after the symbol used to represent "no" in the referendum – an orange. An opportunist lawyer, Mugambi Imanyara, registered the name "Orange Democratic Movement" as a party before the coalition did, forcing them to use the name "Orange Democratic Movement-Kenya" instead.

As 2007 progressed, the coalition proved unstable, with various factions defecting. Uhuru Kenyatta's KANU was the first, pulling out in July 2007 and endorsing President Kibaki's re-election; however, some individual KANU politicians stayed with the ODM. Then, due to an internal rivalry between Kalonzo Musyoka and Raila Odinga, the ODM split into two factions in mid-August 2007. Raila's group, which also included Musalia Mudavadi, William Ruto, Joseph Nyagah and Najib Balala defected from ODM-Kenya and took over the ODM party registered by Mugambi Imanyara, while Kalonzo's group, led by himself and Dr. Julia Ojiambo remained in the original ODM-Kenya.

The two factions held their elections for presidential candidates on consecutive days at the Kasarani sports complex in Nairobi. On 31 August 2007, Kalonzo Musyoka defeated Julia Ojiambo for the ODM–Kenya ticket, then on 1 September Raila Odinga defeated Ruto, Mudavadi, Balala and Nyagah. There were allegations that some delegates voted in the nominations of both parties.

=== General election ===
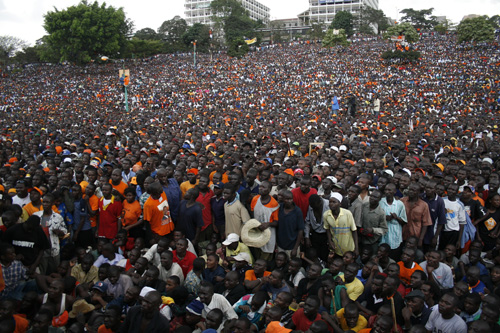
ODM supporters at a political rally at Uhuru Park, 2007

Raila and Kalonzo then faced president Kibaki in the general election. The International Republican Institute described election day as "generally calm, organized, and transparent". Kibaki was declared winner of the elections in circumstances that were described as "highly questionable" by various observers. Samuel Kivuitu, chairman of the now disbanded Electoral Commission of Kenya (ECK) could not explain why votes from nearby constituencies had not reached the tallying centre in Nairobi while those from far-flung parts of the country were tallied on time. According to election observers, both sides participated in ballot stuffing with vote-rigging in a third of all constituencies. The Independent noted two constitiencies had more votes cast than the number of registered voters. Maragua constituency, a PNU stronghold, announced a turnout of 115% while Raila won one constituency by 100.5%.

The ODM disputed the results. Violence erupted in the country with ODM supporters in Kibera, Naivasha and Nakuru being targeted for attack by Mungiki-supporting gangs, allegedly backed by police. PNU supporters were also targeted for attack by ODM supporters. People from the Luo ethnic group were shot dead in Kisumu, Kibera and Nakuru in large numbers while many ethnic Kikuyu were killed in the Rift Valley.

The ODM won the largest number of seats with 99 in the 210 seat parliament. It also won three out of five by-elections in early 2008. No sooner had the by-elections been conducted in the constituencies of two ODM MPs who were killed at the beginning of the year than two more MPs died in an aircraft crash. Some ODM MPs whose elections were contested in court lost their seats.

== Political Parties Act and party elections ==
Following the passing of the Political Parties Act months earlier, the ODM held its internal elections in late December 2008 with Prime Minister Raila Odinga emerging as party leader and Industrialisation Minister Henry Kosgey as party chairman. Due to agitation over regional and gender representation, some party posts had to be created on the day of the vote. Raila later fell out with William Ruto, Ababu Namwamba, Joseph Nyagah, Najib Balala, and Henry Kosgey among others.

== Leadership ==
Raila Odinga led the Orange Democratic Movement from 2005 (when it was still called ODM-Kenya), through 2007; when he received the party certificate, until his death on 15 October 2025. He was formally elected Party Leader in December 2008 and remained in that position through subsequent elections. On 16 October 2025, Dr Oburu Oginga was appointed acting party leader after the death of Raila. He was officially elected to the position on 27 March 2026.

Professor Anyang' Nyong'o served as ODM's first Secretary General from 2007 to 2014. Elections were held on 28 February and 1 March 2014 to elect a new leaders, where Ababu Namwamba emerged as Secretary General. He served in that capacity from 2014 to his 2016 resignation. Agnes Zani served in an acting capacity for two years; 2016 to 2018.Edwin Sifuna was elected party Secretary General on 23 February 2018, succeeding Ababu Namwamba.

It currently has two deputy Secretary Generals: Catherine Omanyo and Doctor Agnes Zani.

ODM's supreme decision-making body and highest organ (party conference) is the National Delegates Conference (NDC) sometimes referred to as the National Delegates Convention. It meets annually where it discusses the party's agenda, elects officials, and charts the way forward. It has the power to determine overall party policy, elect national officials, amend the party constitution, nominate presidential candidates and make major strategic decisions (like coalitions or leadership changes).

=== Parliamentary leadership ===
Through its existence, ODM has maintained minority party status in various administrations. Currently, Stewart Madzayo is the country's Senate minority leader. Junet Mohamed is recognised as the National Assembly minority leader.

=== 2026 Secretary general row ===
Edwin Sifuna was removed from the post on 11 February 2026 in absentia during a National Delegates Convention (NDC) meeting in Mombasa after he criticised the government's economic policies, like the "Nyota Fund" and due to his perceived role as leader of a "rebel wing" (Linda Mwananchi). Deputy Secretary General, Ms Catherine Omanyo, was picked as acting Secretary General until a new holder could be elected. Earlier, his perceived allies, senator Johnes Mwaruma, Member of Parliament Caleb Amisi and Kipkorir Arap Menjo were removed from the NDC in accordance with party rules. A day after his removal, the Political Parties Dispute Tribunal (PPDT) gave him temporary reprieve and barred ODM from executing his removal and the Registrar of Political Parties from publishing it in the Kenya Gazette. The court additionally set a 26 February hearing where it extended the restriction on his removal and set 12 March as the second hearing date. On the second hearing, ODM said that Sifuna should have exhausted the party's internal dispute resolution mechanisms while Sifuna's lawyers argued that the actions taken by the NEC were unconstitutional, did not follow the internal dispute resolution mechanisms because the matter was announced publicly on X rather than privately, did not follow due procedures, did not notify him and did not give him a chance to defend himself. The court's decision was made on 26 March, where the PPDT Chairperson, Gad Gathu, declined to make a ruling and instead urged both Sifuna and ODM to resolve the matter in good faith and exhaust the party's Internal Dispute Resolution Mechanism (IDRM). He added that ODM's disciplinary action should adhere to their constitution and all applicable laws and facilitate the subject of the action to return to the tribunal for redress as provided under the Political Parties Act. In a 9 July letter, the Registrar of Political Parties, John Cox Lorionokou, informed Sifuna that his office had reviewed the documents submitted to it and, in addition to Sifuna's lack of response, had reached the decision that his removal followed the Political Parties Act (Cap. 7D) and ODM's constitution.

== Coalitions and alliances ==
=== 2013 general election ===
In the lead up to the 2013 general elections, the ODM entered a coalition with FORD-Kenya and the Wiper Democratic Movement to support a single presidential candidate, known as the Coalition for Reforms and Democracy.

=== Azimio la Umoja ===
Prior to the 2022 Kenyan general election, the Orange Democratic Movement came together with twenty five other parties to form the Azimio la Umoja coalition in support of a single presidential candidate, Raila Odinga. On 2 February 2026, the Azimio Coalition Party Council and National Executive Committee, NEC (not to be confused with ODM's NEC) joint session removed Junet Mohamed as the coalition's Secretary General replacing him with Caroli Omondi, Raphael Tuju as Executive Director replacing him with Philip Kisiwa and naming Kalonzo Musyoka as Raila's replacement as party leader. ODM responded by issuing a 90 day formal notice of withdrawal from the Azimio Coalition.

=== UDA-ODM 10 point agenda ===
On 7 March 2025, the United Democratic Alliance's William Ruto and ODM's Raila Odinga signed a 10 point memorandum of understanding with the goal of easing political tensions after the widespread 2024 protests and making government reforms.

== Electoral history ==
=== Presidential elections ===
Election	Party candidate	Running mate	Votes	%	Result
2007	Raila Odinga		4,352,993	44.1%	Lost ✗
2013	Raila Odinga	Kalonzo Musyoka	5,340,546	43.7%	Lost ✗
2017	Raila Odinga	Kalonzo Musyoka	6,822,812	44.9%	Annulled ✗
Oct 2017	Raila Odinga	Kalonzo Musyoka	73,228	1.0%	Lost ✗
2022	Raila Odinga	Martha Karua	6,942,930	48.85%	Lost ✗

=== National Assembly elections ===
Election	Party leader	Votes		%	Seats	+/–	Position
2007	Raila Odinga	2,973,415		30.83%	99 / 210	▲99	▲1st
2013	Raila Odinga	Constituency	2,608,898	21.39%	96 / 349	▼3	1st
2013	Raila Odinga	County	2,776,214	22.94%	96 / 349	▼3	1st
2017	Raila Odinga	Constituency	2,884,267	19.23%	76 / 349	▼20	▼2nd
2017	Raila Odinga	County	3,649,509	24.06%	76 / 349	▼20	▼2nd
2022	Raila Odinga	Constituency	3,563,387	25.21%	86 / 349	▲10	2nd
2022	Raila Odinga	County	3,341,926	23.64%	86 / 349	▲10	2nd

=== Senate elections ===
Election	Party leader	Votes	%	Seats	+/–	Position
2013	Raila Odinga	2,669,514	22.01%	17 / 67	▲17	▲2nd
2017	Raila Odinga	3,603,167	23.84%	20 / 67	▲2	2nd
2022	Raila Odinga	3,283,267	23.10%	20 / 67	0	2nd
