= Sub-counties of Kenya =

Sub-counties, formerly known as Districts, are the decentralised units through which government of Kenya provides functions and services. At national level, sub-counties take a more administrative function like security, statistical purposes, provision of government services, etc. Even though the sub-counties are divisions of counties, powers to create new national sub-counties lies with the national government. As of 2023, there are 314 sub-counties, compared to 290 constituencies. A deputy county commissioner is appointed by the state to lead each sub-county. The sub-counties are further divided into divisions, locations and sub-locations.

Districts were introduced in Kenya by the colonial government to ease control and management of the colony. The number of districts in Kenya through the colonial period varied. Headed by District Commissioners (DC), districts were the second level of administration after the provinces. In 1962, as the colony was transitioning to self-rule, the colonial government redrew the districts and capped them at forty, in addition to the Nairobi Area. A bicameral parliament meant that the districts were to send one senator to the Senate. In 1966, the Senate was abolished by an amendment to the constitution, making the districts purely administrative. By 1992, one district had been eliminated, six more had been created by splitting some of the existing districts. By the start of the 21st century more districts had been created, and by 2005, seventy two districts were in existence, and by 2010, Kenya had 265 districts. In 2009, the High Court declared all districts created after 1992 unlawful, though they remained functional.

Under the former Constitution of Kenya, the Provinces of Kenya were subdivided into a number of districts (wilaya). In line with restructuring the national administration to fit with the devolved government system brought in by the 2010 Constitution, that came into full effect following elections in March 2013, the 8 provinces and their administrators and districts were replaced by County Commissioners at the county level, while former districts existing as of 2013 were re-organised as sub-counties, and had Deputy Commissioners appointed over them.

At county government level, except for the parts which fall under urban areas, sub-counties coincide with the constituencies created under article 89 of the Constitution of Kenya. In that case, constituencies are sometimes referred to as 'sub-counties' at county management level, but defer significantly from the sub-counties at national level. The sub-counties have a sub-county administrator, appointed by a County Public Service Board. The sub-counties or constituencies in this case are further divided into wards and villages. The county governments are mandated to appoint administrators in both decentralised levels.

== List of the 40 districts plus the Nairobi Region (as per 1963 constitution) ==
As per the 1963 Constitution of Kenya, apart from Nairobi, there were forty districts across the seven semi-autonomus regions of Kenya which later became referred to as provinces. The districts were represented by a single member in the senate.

Coast Region:

- Kilifi District (Kilifi)
- Kwale District (Kwale)
- Lamu District (Lamu)
- Mombasa District (Mombasa)
- Taita District (Wundanyi)
- Tana River District (Galole)

North Eastern Region:

- Garissa District (Garissa)
- Mandera District (Mandera)
- Wajir District (Wajir)

Eastern Region:

- Embu District (Embu)
- Isiolo District (Isiolo)
- Kitui District (Kitui)
- Machakos District (Machakos)
- Marsabit District (Marsabit)
- Meru District (Meru)

Central Region:

- Thika District (Thika)
- Kiambu District (Kiambu)
- Kirinyaga District (Kerugoya)
- Fort Hall District (Fort Hall)
- Nyandarua District (Thompson's Falls)
- Nyeri District (Nyeri)

Rift Valley Region:

- Baringo District (Kabarnet)
- Elgeyo-Marakwet District (Iten)
- Kajiado District (Kajiado)
- Kericho District (Kericho)
- Laikipia District (Nanyuki)
- Nakuru District (Nakuru)
- Nandi District (Kapsabet)
- Narok District (Narok)
- Samburu District (Maralal)
- Trans Nzoia District (Kitale)
- Turkana District (Lodwar)
- Uasin Gishu District (Eldoret)
- West Pokot District (Kapenguria)

Western Region:

- Bungoma District (Bungoma)
- Busia District (Busia)
- Kakamega District (Kakamega)

Nyanza Region:

- Central Nyanza District (Kisumu)
- South Nyanza District (Homa Bay)
- Kisii District (Kisii)

== List of the 46 districts plus the capital of Kenya (as of 1992) ==
Following a High Court ruling in September 2009, there were 46 legal districts in Kenya, excluding Nairobi which constituted a 47th district.

Following the Kenyan general election, 2013, these districts and Nairobi now constitute the 47 counties which will be the basis for rolling out devolution as set out in the 2010 Constitution of Kenya (district headquarters are in parentheses):

Coast Province:

- Kilifi District (Kilifi)
- Kwale District (Kwale)
- Lamu District (Lamu)
- Mombasa District (Mombasa)
- Taita-Taveta District (Wundanyi)
- Tana River District (Hola)

North Eastern Province:

- Garissa District (Garissa)
- Mandera District (Mandera)
- Wajir District (Wajir)

Eastern Province:

- Embu District (Embu)
- Isiolo District (Isiolo)
- Kitui District (Kitui)
- Machakos District (Machakos)
- Makueni District (Makueni)
- Marsabit District (Marsabit)
- Meru District (Meru)
- Tharaka-Nithi District (Chuka)

Central Province:

- Kiambu District (Kiambu)
- Kirinyaga District (Kerugoya/Kutus)
- Murang'a District (Murang'a)
- Nyandarua District (Nyahururu)
- Nyeri District (Nyeri)

Rift Valley Province:

- Baringo District (Kabarnet)
- Bomet District (Bomet)
- Elgeyo-Marakwet District (Iten)
- Kajiado District (Kajiado)
- Kericho District (Kericho)
- Laikipia District (Nanyuki)
- Nakuru District (Nakuru)
- Nandi District (Kapsabet)
- Narok District (Narok)
- Samburu District (Maralal)
- Trans Nzoia District (Kitale)
- Turkana District (Lodwar)
- Uasin Gishu District (Eldoret)
- West Pokot District (Kapenguria)

Western Province:

- Bungoma District (Bungoma)
- Busia (Busia)
- Kakamega District (Kakamega)
- Vihiga District (Vihiga)

Nyanza Province:

- Homa Bay District (Homa Bay)
- Kisii District (Kisii)
- Kisumu District (Kisumu)
- Migori District (Migori)
- Nyamira District (Nyamira)
- Siaya District (Siaya)

All these 46 districts (plus Nairobi) have been replaced with 47 counties since March 2013, promoting them as the first level of administrative subdivisions of the country, and the 8 former provinces (which were the first level of subdivisions) have been dissolved.

New districts started to be created by President Moi, and there were up to 57 districts in 2003 when President Kibaki first came into office.

== List of the 70 districts of Kenya (starting 2007) ==
In early January 2007, 37 new districts were created by the government from the 14 former districts, rising their number to 70.

- Baringo District (Kabarnet)
- Bomet District (Bomet)
- Bondo District (Bondo)
- Bungoma District (Bungoma)
- Buret District (Litein)
- Busia (Busia)
- Butere/Mumias District (Butere)
- Embu District (Embu)
- Garissa District (Garissa)
- Gucha District (Ogembo)
- Homa Bay District (Homa Bay)
- Ijara District (Ijara)
- Isiolo District (Isiolo)
- Kajiado District (Kajiado)
- Kakamega District (Kakamega)
- Keiyo District (Iten/Tambach)
- Kericho District (Kericho)
- Kiambu District (Kiambu)
- Kilifi District (Kilifi)
- Kirinyaga District (Kerugoya/Kutus)
- Kisii Central (Kisii)
- Kisumu District (Kisumu)
- Kitui District (Kitui)
- Koibatek District (Eldama Ravine)
- Kuria District (Kehancha)
- Kwale District (Kwale)
- Laikipia District (Nanyuki)
- Lamu District (Lamu)
- Lugari District (Lugari)
- Machakos District (Machakos)
- Makueni District (Makueni)
- Malindi District (Malindi)
- Mandera District (Mandera)
- Maragua District (Maragua)
- Marakwet District (Kapsowar)
- Marsabit District (Marsabit)
- Mbeere District (Mbeere)
- Meru Central District (Meru)
- Meru North District (Maua)
- Meru South District (Chuka)
- Migori District (Migori)
- Mombasa District (Mombasa)
- Mount Elgon District (Mount Elgon)
- Moyale District (Moyale)
- Murang'a District (Murang'a)
- Mwingi District (Mwingi)
- Nairobi District (Nairobi)
- Nakuru District (Nakuru)
- Nandi (Kapsabet)
- Narok District (Narok)
- Nyamira District (Nyamira)
- Nyandarua District (Ol Kalou)
- Nyando District (Awasi)
- Nyeri District (Nyeri)
- Rachuonyo District (Oyugis)
- Samburu District (Maralal)
- Siaya District (Siaya)
- Suba District (Mbita)
- Taita-Taveta District (Wundanyi)
- Tana River District (Tana River)
- Teso District (Malaba)
- Tharaka District (Tharaka)
- Thika District (Thika)
- Trans Mara District (Kilgoris)
- Trans Nzoia District (Kitale)
- Turkana District (Lodwar)
- Uasin Gishu District (Eldoret)
- Vihiga District (Vihiga)
- Wajir District (Wajir)
- West Pokot District (Kapenguria)
- Arabia (Mandera )

== More recent (defunct) districts (after 2007 up to March 2013) ==
Many more districts have been created since then, such that in July 2009 there were 254 districts (an up to 256 districts plus Nairobi on 20 September 2009, when the High Court outlawed 210 of them).

The creation of new districts has been criticised by opponents for being waste of money and a populist attempt to please local residents. The government, however, say new districts bring services closer to the people and will provide security.

The following list contains 208 districts, taken from a Kenyan government website in July 2009 (the list is incomplete, but their number stopped growing after the High Court decision in September 2009):

Districts	Headquarters
Central Province
Gatanga District	–
Gatundu District	Gatundu
Githunguri District	Githunguri
Kabete District	–
Kandara District	–
Kiambaa District	Kiambu
Kiambu East District	Kiambu
Kiambu West District	Limuru
Kieni West District	Chaka
Kieni East District	Chaka
Kigumo District	–
Kipipiri District	–
Kirinyaga Central District	–
Kirinyaga East District	Kerugoya
Kirinyaga South District	–
Kirinyaga West District	–
Lari District	–
Mirangini District	–
Mukurweini District	Mukurweini
Muranga East District	Muranga
Muranga South District	Kenol
Nyandarua Central District	Ol Kalou
Nyandarua North District	Nyahururu
Nyandarua South District	Engineer
Nyandarua West District	–
Nyeri Central District	Nyeri
Nyeri East District	Karatina
Nyeri South District	Nyeri
Ruiru District	–
Thika East District	Thika
Thika West District	–
Coast Province
Kaloleni District	Kizurini
Kilifi District	Kilifi
Kilindini District	Dongo Kundu
Kinango District	Kinango
Kwale District	Kwale
Lamu District	Lamu
Malindi District	Malindi
Mombasa District	Mombasa
Msabweni District	Msambweni
Taita District	Wundanyi
Tana Delta District	–
Tana River District	Hola
Taveta District	Taveta
Eastern Province
Buuri District	Timau
Embu East District	Rúnyenjes
Embu West District	Embu
Garbatula District	Garbatula
Igembe North District	Laare
Igembe South District	Maua
Imenti North District	Meru
Imenti South District	Nkubu
Isiolo District	Isiolo
Kangundo District	Kangundo
Kathiani District	–
Kathonzweni District	–
Kibwezi District	Makindu
Kilungu District	–
Kitui Central District	Kitui
Kitui West District	–
Kyuso District	Kyuso
Maara District	Kieganguru
Machakos District	Machakos
Makueni District	Wote
Marsabit District	Marsabit
Marsabit North District	Malkona
Marsabit South District	Laisamis
Masinga District	–
Matungulu District	–
Mbeere North District	Siakago
Mbeere South District	Kírítirí
Mbooni East District	Mbumbuni
Mbooni West District	Mbooni
Meru Central District	Gatimbi
Meru South District	Chuka
Moyale District	Moyale
Mukaa District	–
Mutitu District	–
Mutomo District	Mutomo
Mwala District	–
Mwingi District	Mwingi
Nzaui District	–
Tharaka North District	Marimanti
Tharaka South District	–
Tigania East District	Muriri
Tigania West District	Urru
Yatta District	Kithimani
Nairobi Province
Nairobi East District	Komarock
Nairobi North District	Kasarani
Nairobi West District	Ndararua/J.Kangethe
Westlands District	–
North Eastern Province
Fafi District	Bura
Garissa District	Garissa
Ijara District	Masaini
Lagdera District	Modogashe
Mandera Central District	Mandera
Mandera East District	El Wak
Mandera North District	Rhamu
Mandera West District	Tabaka
Wajir East District	Wajir
Wajir North District	Bute
Wajir South District	Habaswein
Wajir West District	Gritu
Nyanza Province
Bondo District	Bondo
Borabu District	Nyansiongo
Gucha District	Ogembo
Homa Bay District	Homa Bay
Kanyanya District	–
Kisii Central District	Kisii
Kisii South District	Kerina
Kisumu East District	Holo
Kisumu West District	Kisumu
Kuria East District	Kegonga
Kuria West District	Kehancha
Manga District	Manga
Marani District	–
Masaba District	Keroka
Mbita District	–
Migori District	Migori
Ndhiwa District	Ndhiwa
North Masaba District	–
Nyakach District	Pap Ondit
Nyamache District	–
Nyamira District	Nyamira
Nyamira North District	–
Nyando District	Awasi
Nyatike District	Macaider
Rachuonyo North District	–
Rachuonyo South District	–
Rarieda District	Madiany
Rongo District	Rongo
Siaya District	Siaya
South Gucha District	Nyamarambe
Suba District	Mbita
Uriri District	–
Rift Valley Province
Baringo Central District	Kabarnet
Baringo North District	Kabartonjo
Bomet District	Bomet
Buret District	Litein
East Pokot District	Chemlingot
Eldoret East District	Naiberi
Eldoret West District	Eldoret
Kajiado North District	Kajiado
Kajiado South District	–
Keiyo District	Iten
Kericho District	Kericho
Kipkelion District	Kipkelion
Koibatek District	Eldama Ravine
Kwanza District	Endebess
Laikipia Central District	–
Laikipia East District	Nanyuki
Laikipia North District	Mukogodo
Laikipia West District	Rumuruti
Loima District	–
Loitoktok District	Loitoktok
Marakwet District	Kapsowar
Marigat District	–
Mogotio District	–
Molo District	Molo
Naivasha District	Naivasha
Nakuru District	Nakuru Town
Nakuru North District	Bahati
Nandi Central District	Kapsabet
Nandi East District	-
Nandi North District	Kabiyet
Nandi South District	Kabujoi
Narok North District	Narok
Narok South District	Olulunga
Njoro District	–
North Pokot District	Kacheliba
Nyahururu District	Nyahururu
Pokot Central District	Sighor
Samburu Central District	Maralal
Samburu East District	Wamba
Samburu North District	Baragoi
Sotik District	Sotik
Tinderet District	Maraba
Trans Nzoia East District	Maili Saba
Trans Nzoia West District	Kitale
Trans Mara District	Kilgoris
Turkana Central District	Lodwar
Turkana East District	–
Turkana North District	Lokitaung
Turkana South District	Lokichar
Turkana West District	–
Wareng District	Kesses
West Pokot District	Kapenguria
Western Province
Bungoma Central District	Chwele
Bungoma East District	Webuye
Bungoma North District	Kimilili
Bungoma South District	Bungoma
Bungoma West District	Sirisia
Bunyula District	Budalangi
Busia District	Busia
Butere District	Butere
Emuhaya District	Kima
Hamisi District	Hamisi
Kakamega Central District	Kakamega
Kakamega East District	Shinyalu
Kakamega North District	Malava
Kakamega South District	Malinya
Lugari District	Lumakanda
Mt. Elgon District	Kapsokwony
Mumias District	Mumias
Samia District	Funyula
Teso North District	Amagoro
Teso South District	Amakura
Vihiga District	Mbale

== Sub-counties (since March 2013) ==
In August 2009, however, the High Court of Kenya declared all districts created after 1992 illegal. The judge stated that the districts were created "in complete disregard of the law". As a result, Kenya had only 46 legal districts (excluding Nairobi with its special constitutional status as the capital of the country). Following the March 2013 elections, these 46 districts – together with the City of Nairobi – constitute the 47 counties into which Kenya is now divided administratively, and they are also the 47 constituencies for the elections to the National Senate.

All the former districts have disappeared (as well as the former 8 provinces whose devolution was transferred to the new 47 counties), and are now considered only as "sub-counties", without autonomy; they are used in urban areas for a limited organisation for providing public services locally. These remaining sub-counties are transitional and could be replaced by more efficient cooperative structures grouping the local services in organised cities and their surrounding towns, either for dedicated missions or for temporary plans; so they may be deeply reorganised or disappear at any time. The remaining sub-counties already do not match with the subdivision of the new 47 counties into electoral-only "wards" based on resident population, to determine the number of elected seats for each county in the National Senate.
