= Provinces of Kenya =

Former administrative divisions

Former Provinces of Kenya: 1. Central; 2. Coast; 3. Eastern; 4. Nairobi / 5. North Eastern; 6. Nyanza; 7. Rift Valley; 8. Western

Kenya's former provinces were replaced by a system of 47 counties in 2013, following the general elections held on March 4, 2013, which fully implemented the devolved government system outlined in the Constitution of Kenya 2010.

== History ==
Before the new constitution of Kenya that came into force on 27 August 2010, Kenya was divided into eight provinces (see map). The provinces, excluding Nairobi Province, were subdivided into 46 districts as at 1992, which were further subdivided into 262 divisions. The divisions were subdivided into 2,427 locations and 6,612 sublocations. A province was administered by a Provincial Commissioner. This division of these provinces was a result of the devolution that came into effect after the promulgation of the 2010 Constitution.

A third discrete type of classification are electoral constituencies. They are electoral areas without administrative functions, and are further subdivided into wards.

== Former provinces ==
1. Rift Valley
2. Eastern
3. Nyanza
4. Central
5. Coast
6. Western
7. Nairobi
8. North Eastern

== Counties by former province ==
Code	County	Province	Area(km2)	Population(2009 Census)	Population Density(people/km2)	Location
1	Mombasa	Coast	212.5	939,370	4420	Mombasa (City)
2	Kwale	Coast	8,270.3	649,931	79	Kwale
3	Kilifi	Coast	12,245.9	1,109,735	91	Kilifi
4	Tana River	Coast	35,375.8	240,075	7	Hola
5	Lamu	Coast	6,497.7	101,539	16	Lamu
6	Taita-Taveta	Coast	17,083.9	284,657	17	Voi
	Sub-Totals	Coast	79,686.1	3,325,307	42	
7	Garissa	North Eastern	45,720.2	623,060	14	Garissa
8	Wajir	North Eastern	55,840.6	661,941	12	Wajir
9	Mandera	North Eastern	25,797.7	1,025,756	40	Mandera
	Sub-Totals	North Eastern	127,358.5	2,310,757	18	
10	Marsabit	Eastern	66,923.1	291,166	4	Marsabit
11	Isiolo	Eastern	25,336.1	143,294	6	Isiolo
12	Meru	Eastern	5,127.1	1,356,301	265	Meru
13	Tharaka-Nithi	Eastern	2,409.5	365,330	152	Chuka
14	Embu	Eastern	2,555.9	516,212	202	Embu
15	Kitui	Eastern	24,385.1	1,012,709	42	Kitui
16	Machakos	Eastern	5,952.9	1,098,584	185	Machakos
17	Makueni	Eastern	8,008.9	884,527	110	Wote
	Sub-Totals	Eastern	140,698.6	5,668,123	40	
18	Nyandarua	Central	3,107.7	596,268	192	Ol Kalou
19	Nyeri	Central	2,361.0	693,558	294	Nyeri
20	Kirinyaga	Central	1,205.4	528,054	438	Kerugoya / Kutus
21	Murang'a	Central	2,325.8	942,581	405	Murang'a
22	Kiambu	Central	2,449.2	1,623,282	663	Kiambu
	Sub-Totals	Central	11,449.1	4,383,743	383	
23	Turkana	Rift Valley	71,597.8	855,399	12	Lodwar
24	West Pokot	Rift Valley	8,418.2	512,690	61	Kapenguria
25	Samburu	Rift Valley	20,182.5	223,947	11	Maralal
26	Trans Nzoia	Rift Valley	2,469.9	818,757	331	Kitale
27	Uasin Gishu	Rift Valley	2,955.3	894,179	302	Eldoret (City)
28	Elgeyo-Marakwet	Rift Valley	3,049.7	369,998	121	Iten
29	Nandi	Rift Valley	2,884.5	752,965	261	Kapsabet
30	Baringo	Rift Valley	11,075.3	555,561	50	Kabarnet
31	Laikipia	Rift Valley	8,696.1	399,227	46	Rumuruti
32	Nakuru	Rift Valley	7,509.5	1,603,325	213	Nakuru (City)
33	Narok	Rift Valley	17,921.2	850,920	47	Narok
34	Kajiado	Rift Valley	21,292.7	687,312	32	Kajiado
35	Kericho	Rift Valley	2,454.5	752,396	307	Kericho
36	Bomet	Rift Valley	1,997.9	730,129	365	Bomet
	Sub-Totals	Rift Valley	182,505.1	10,006,805	55	
37	Kakamega	Western	3,033.8	1,660,651	547	Kakamega
38	Vihiga	Western	531.3	554,622	1044	Vihiga
39	Bungoma	Western	2,206.9	1,375,063	623	Bungoma
40	Busia	Western	1,628.4	743,946	457	Busia
	Sub-Totals	Western	7,400.4	4,334,202	586	
41	Siaya	Nyanza	2,496.1	842,304	338	Siaya
42	Kisumu	Nyanza	2,009.5	968,909	482	Kisumu (City)
43	Homa Bay	Nyanza	3,154.7	963,794	305	Homa Bay
44	Migori	Nyanza	2,586.4	917,170	355	Migori
45	Kisii	Nyanza	1,317.9	1,152,282	875	Kisii
46	Nyamira	Nyanza	912.5	598,252	655	Nyamira
	Sub-Totals	Nyanza	12,477.1	5,442,711	436	
47	Nairobi	Nairobi	694.9	3,138,369	4516	Nairobi (City)
	Totals		581,309.0	38,610,097	66	

== See also ==
- ISO 3166-2:KE
- List of provinces of Kenya by Human Development Index
