= 2006 Horn of Africa food crisis =

Famine in East Africa

In 2006, an acute shortage of food affected the countries in the Horn of Africa (Somalia, Djibouti and Ethiopia), as well as northeastern Kenya. The United Nations's Food and Agriculture Organization (FAO) estimated on January 6, 2006, that more than 11 million people in these countries may be affected by an impending widespread famine, largely attributed to a severe drought, and exacerbated by military conflicts in the region.

== Causes ==
Drought is a predictable event in the Horn of Africa, and when combined with other factors it causes conflict and terrible human misery. Previous droughts in 1983–85, 1991–92 and 1998–99 swiftly reversed gradual increase in livestock and caused losses in the cattle population of up to 62%. These conditions of drought, together with other factors including high cereal prices, overpopulation in the region, abandoning traditional rangeland management methods and conflict, are leading to conditions of famine. In the present 2006 drought, claims about factors transforming drought into famine include a ban on livestock imports to markets in the Persian Gulf States, which has reduced the income of livestock-dependent farmers, further increasing food insecurity.

The population in East Africa had increased rapidly in the decades before the food crisis. From 67 million in 1950 to 306 million in 2006.

== Crisis ==
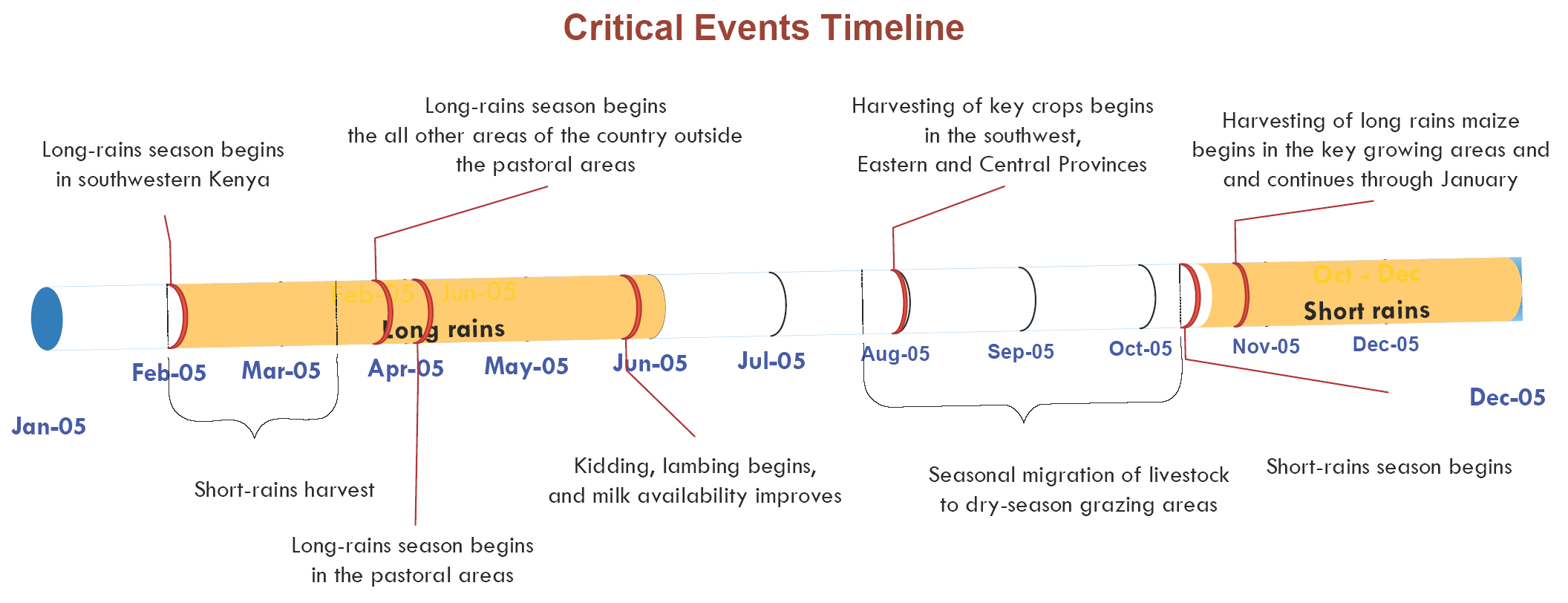
Timeline of critical events in Kenya. Graphic from the Famine Early Warning Systems Network (FEWS), USAID.

=== Djibouti ===
Djibouti was a severely drought affected; the FAO estimated that about one third of the population (400 000 people) needed food aid.

=== Ethiopia ===
The FAO estimated that more than one million people in the Somali Region of Ethiopia were facing severe food shortages. Although crops are currently being harvested, shortages are still expected to occur in the country's south-east.

=== Kenya ===
Crop failure, drought and depleted livestock herds led to famine conditions in the Cushitic-inhabited northern and eastern pastoral districts of Mandera, Wajir, and Marsabit. As of January 6, 2006, approximately 30 deaths were reported. Some 2.5 million people (10% of the population) required food aid over the next six months, which led the Kenyan President Mwai Kibaki to declare a national disaster.

=== Somalia ===
Somalia was the least affected out of the four countries. About two million people in the country's southern pastoral regions required humanitarian assistance. The prolonged absence of a strong central government and poor transportation infrastructure also posed problems for the distribution of food aid.

== Relief effort ==
In February 2006, UNICEF warned that 1.5 million children under the age of five were being threatened by the drought and called for $16 million USD to help fund its relief efforts in the region.

== See also ==
- 2011 East Africa drought
- 1984–1985 famine in Ethiopia
- 2010 Sahel drought
- Sahel drought
