= Tana River District =

Former district of Kenya

- Former district
- Country: Kenya
- Province: Coast Province

Population (2009)
  - Total: 143,411
- Population of Tana River District, minus the Tana Delta District
- Time zone: UTC+3 (EAT)

Tana River District was a district of Coast Province, Kenya. It was named after the Tana River itself. Before a split that led to the creation of Tana Delta District, Tana River had an area as of 38,446 square kilometres (14,844 sq mi). The district capital was Hola, also known as Galole.

Within Tanaland Province, Tana River District was created in 1897, with its headquarters at Kipini. In 1920, Tanaland Province was abolished, part of the district was administered from Kismayu and was transferred to the Northern Frontier in 1922. In 1923, Tana River was combined with Lamu District, thus falling within the Coast Province. Tana River reacquired district status in 1927, reinstating its headquarters at Kipini. Lamu and Tana River would be joined in 1935, again between 1944 and 1948. In 1959, the district's headquarters were moved from Kipini to Galole, and a review of the district's saw portions of Kitui District of Central Province combined with Tana River, while hinterland areas of Tana River hived off and combined with Garissa District. In 1963, Tana River was one of the districts of the Coast Province of Kenya.

The major ethnic groups are the Pokomo, many of whom are farmers, and the Orma and Wardey, who are predominantly nomadic. The district is generally dry and prone to drought. Rainfall is erratic, with rainy seasons in March–May and October–December. Conflicts have occurred between farmers and nomadic peoples over access to water. Flooding was also a regular problem, caused by heavy rainfall in upstream areas of the Tana River. On 22 August 2012, in the worst violent incident in Kenya since 2007, at least 52 people were killed in ethnic violence in the Tana River District between the Orma and Pokomo groups.

Tana River district was split into two with an additional district, Tana Delta created. Tana River had a total population of 143,411, while Tana Delta had 96,664. Most of the population was rural across the two districts, with a combined population of 204,210.

In 2010, after the promulgation of the new constitution of Kenya, counties were to be created based on the districts of Kenya that as at 1992. This effectively meant that Tana River District boundaries prior to the split with Tana Delta had to be reinstated to create Tana River County.

== District subdivisions ==
Despite the large area of the Tana River district, its only local authority is Tana River County Council. The district has three constituencies: Garsen, Galole and Bura.

Administrative divisions
Division	Population*	Urban population*	population density	Area (km^{2})	Headquarters
Bangale	14,853	0	2	x	
Bura	28,848	0	6	x	Bura
Galole	34,948	9,383	4	x	Hola
Garsen	51,592	4,885	4	x	Garsen
Kipini	16,243	0	19	x	Kipini
Madogo	21,731	0	12	x	
Wenje	12,686	0	23	x	Wenje
Total	180,901	14,268	5 (average)	x	
* 1999 census. Sources:

== 2012 ethnic violence ==
On 22 August 2012, in the worst violent incident in Kenya since 2007, at least 52 people were killed in ethnic violence in the Tana River District between the Orma and Pokomo groups.
