= Shifta War =

1963–1967 Somali secessionist conflict in Kenya

- Part of the Somali–Kenyan conflict
Date	c. November 1963–1967 (4 years)
Location	North Eastern Province, Kenya
Result	Inconclusive

Belligerents
Kenya Colony (until Dec. 1963); Kenya (from Dec. 1963); Supported by: United Kingdom; Ethiopian Empire	Northern Frontier Districts Liberation Movement: Hawiye group; Darod group; Supported by: Somalia; Soviet Union

Commanders and leaders
Jomo Kenyatta	Maalim Mohammed Stamboul (Darod group)

Strength
	Hundreds (1963); 1,200+ (1966)

Casualties and losses
- 4,200+ killed

The Shifta War or Gaf Daba (1963–1967) was a secessionist conflict in which ethnic Somalis, Muslim Borana, Sakuye, Gabbra and Rendille in the then Northern Frontier District (NFD) of Kenya attempted to join Somalia. The Kenyan government named the conflict "shifta", after the Swahili word for "bandit", as part of a propaganda effort. The Kenyan counter-insurgency General Service Units forced civilians into "protected villages" (essentially concentration camps) as well as killing livestock kept by the pastoralist Somalis.

The war ended in 1967 when Muhammad Haji Ibrahim Egal, Prime Minister of the Somali Republic, signed a ceasefire with Kenya at the Arusha Conference on 23 October 1967. However, the violence in Kenya deteriorated into disorganised banditry, with occasional episodes for the next several decades.

The war and violent clampdowns by the Kenyan government caused large-scale disruption to the way of life in the district, resulting in a slight shift from pastoralist and transhumant lifestyles to sedentary, urban lifestyles.

== Background ==
The Northern Frontier District (NFD) came into being in 1925. At the time under British colonial administration, the northern half of Jubaland was ceded to Italy as a reward for the Italians' support of the Allies during World War I. Britain retained control of the southern half of the territory, which remained in the Northern Frontier District, and is the current North Eastern province in Kenya. From 1926 to 1934, the NFD, comprising the current North Eastern Province and the districts of Marsabit, Moyale and Isiolo, was closed by British colonial authorities. Movement in and out of the district was possible only through the use of passes. Despite these restrictions, pastoralism was well-suited to the arid conditions and the non-Somali residents—who represented a minority of the region's population. According to colonial authorities in 1962, the region was also inhabited by substantial groups of Boran, Gabra Galla, Orma Galla, Pokomo, "half-Somali" (to which Ajuran and Garre were counted), Rendille, El-molo, and Turkana. These groups even formed a majority in some areas of the NFD.

In 1953, anthropologist John Baxter noted that:

The Boran and the Sakuye were well-nourished and well-clothed and, though a pastoral life is always physically demanding, people led dignified and satisfying life... They had clearly been prospering for some years. In 1940, the District Commissioner commented in his Handing Over Report: "The Ewaso Boran have degenerated through wealth and soft living into an idle and cowardly set"...

On 26 June 1960, four days before granting British Somaliland independence, the British government declared that all Somali areas should be unified in one administrative region. However, after the dissolution of the former British colonies in East Africa, Britain granted administration of the Northern Frontier District to Kenya despite an informal plebiscite demonstrating the overwhelming desire of the region's population to join the newly formed Somali Republic, especially among the Somali community. In 1962, Kenya African National Union (KANU) leader Jomo Kenyatta publicly declared that the NFD's future was "a domestic affair of Kenya", and dismissed fears about militant Somali irredentism by telling Somalis in Kenya to "pack up your camels and go to Somalia". At this point, KANU was confident that any Somali uprising could be easily crushed; the party's leaders were more concerned that the British might provide support to possible separatist groups to recreate a scenario similar to Congo-Kinshasa which had become independent in 1960, only to suffer from extensive, foreign-supported separatism. KANU believed the British colonial officials to be sympathetic toward the Somalis.

Led by the Northern Province People's Progressive Party (NPPPP), many Somali, Muslim Borana, Gabra and Rendille pastoralists in the NFD vigorously sought union with the Somali Republic to the north. This was due to a shared sense of identity by the Muslim connection, as well as the perception that it would be a less controlling regime, which was important to the pastoralist way of life. The NPPPP itself sidelined other separatist groups such as the Nairobi-based "Somali Independent Union". The proposal to unite the NFD with Somalia was widely supported in northern Kenya, even though there were substantial economic and cultural differences as well as tensions within the Somali community. In the 1961 Kenyan general election, the NPPPP gained the support of most Somalis in northern Kenya. However, anti-separatist groups also existed in the NFD, for example the "Northern Province United Association" (NPUA), mainly backed by urban Borana people. Other parties like the "United Ogaden Somali Association" (UOSA) had less clear-cut aims; UOSA repeatedly shifted its political position, at times even advocating the merger of several territories in Kenya, Somalia, and Ethiopia into an independent Greater Ogaden. A minority of Somali pan-nationalists also believed that the NFD should stay part of Kenya, achieve separation through mediation, or become independent from both Kenya and Somalia; however, these viewpoints gradually faded as political camps became increasingly polarized and the discourse more toxic. Separatists and anti-separatists engaged in aggressive rhetoric, and there was occasional communal violence.

The British, while initially including NFD delegates in independence negotiations and appearing to entertain secession, eventually reached an agreement with Kenya's first ruling party, KANU, whereby the state's territorial status quo would be maintained. The judgement of the Northern Frontier Commission of 1962 –which was supposed to examine the possibility of the NFD's separation– was thus rejected by Somali nationalists before it was even announced, as they concluded that the commission would follow the views of the Kenyan nationalists. On 22 November 1963 the British government declared that there would be "no altering Kenya's frontier without the decision of the new Kenyan Government". As the colonial government had sided with the Kenyan nationalists, it began to move against the NPPPP. Between March and May 1963, security forces arrested three NPPPP leaders and exiled them to remote areas. Later on NPPPP secretary general Degho Maalim Stamboul was also detained. The latter's father, Chief Maalim Mohammed Stamboul, would consequently play a major role in the Shifta War. (Note: Researcher Agnes Wanjiru Behr misidentified Maalim Mohammed Stamboul as the NPPPP's leader.)

== Conflict ==
=== Start of the insurgency ===
The conflict began in the weeks leading up to Kenya's independence, as a few hundred Somalis in the NFD took up arms. Hoping to achieve unification with Somalia through a rebellion, NPPPP supporters formed the Northern Frontier Districts Liberation Movement (NFDLM). The NFDLM was divided into two separate groups, centered around the Hawiye and the Darod clans respectively. The former faction was active between Wajir, Moyale, and Mandera, whereas the latter was led by Maalim Mohammed Stamboul and operated near Garissa and Somalia's southwestern border. Non-Somalis such as Turkana would also join the insurgents; members of these ethnic groups were mostly motivated by the fear of restrictions on their movement and lifestyle imposed by the Kenyan government. Despite the insurgents' differing background and internal divisions, they were united by their opposition to the centralism associated with Kenya. Separatists believed that Somalia would interfere less with their affairs, keeping state control weak and thus maintain the local livelihoods which were adapted to a frontier zone with weak state presence.

The province thus entered a period of running skirmishes between the Kenya Army and Somali-backed NFDLM insurgents. The first high-profile victims were two Borana leaders, the first African District Commissioner Dabaso Wabera and tribal chief Haji Galma Dido, who were assassinated while en route to Isiolo to urge locals not to back the secessionists. The two assassins were Somali residents of Kenya who later escaped across the Somali border. In November 1963 the security situation in the NFD rapidly declined as the shifta began directly attacking police and army personnel. Kenya was granted independence on 12 December, and in response NPPPP militants staged evening attacks on northern police stations and administrative posts. These attacks led the NPPPP leadership to publicly distance itself from the shiftas, and declare that it would work toward a union with Somalia through "constitutional means". This move effectively meant that the party contributed to the delegitimization the insurgents.

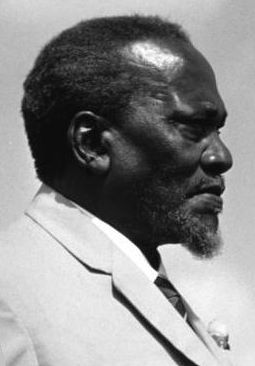
Jomo Kenyatta (pictured 1966) tried to suppress the rebellion without empowering the Kenya Army.

Heavy rains prevented security forces from countering the initial insurgency, especially as the guerrillas enjoyed a high level of support among the NFD's civilian population during the rebellion's first year. Despite this, the Kenyan central government under Kenyatta initially did not consider the fighting in the NFD a high priority issue. Kenyatta was far more concerned a possible army mutiny or a possible coup by his rivals within KANU, and feared that the military could be politically empowered by fighting the insurgents alone. As a result, he decided to turn around in regard to the British influence in the NFD, and request assistance from the United Kingdom to deal with the rebels. Kenyatta restricted the Kenya Army's size despite the threat posed by separatists and tensions with Somalia. He also relied on the paramilitary General Service Unit (GSU) to combat the insurgency. Consisting of about 1,000 "shock troopers", it was trained by the British Special Air Service, mainly consisted of Kikuyu (Kenyatta's ethnic group), and considered firmly loyal to the Kenyan government.

On 28 December 1963, the Kenyan government declared a state of emergency in the North Eastern Region. This consisted of allowing security forces to detain people up to 56 days without trial, confiscating the property of communities allegedly in retaliation for acts of violence, and restricting the right to assembly and movement. A 'prohibited zone' was created along the Somali border, and the death penalty was made mandatory for unauthorised possession of firearms. "Special courts" without guarantee of due process were also created. The northeast—declared a "special district"—was subject to nearly unfettered government control, including the authority to detain, arrest or forcibly move individuals or groups, as well as confiscate possessions and land. However, as part of its effort to reassure the public, the Voice of Kenya was warned not to refer to the conflict as a "border dispute", while a special government committee decided to refer to the rebels as "shiftas" to minimise the political nature of the war. Kenyatta reinforced this portrayal by describing the rebels as mere criminals and claiming that the entire conflict was organized by citizens of Somalia without involvement of Kenyan nationals. He further alleged that of about 2,000 shiftas, only 700 were actually operating in the NFD.

=== Stalemate ===
Despite their initial successes and substantial local support, the shiftas were too weak in numbers and equipment to defeat the security forces. As a result, a stalemate developed. While the shiftas sometimes traded livestock for firearms from civilians, they were generally reliant on weapons supplied by Somalia. From 1963, Somali state support became "vital" for the insurgency. Thus, in February 1964 rebel activity increased after Somalia had received an arms shipment from the Soviet Union but it declined in March as their supplies ran out. Backed by British troops, the Kenya Army also began a major offensive in that month, though this did not prevent the rebels from staging a major offensive of their own against the town of Marsabit. At this point, half of the Kenya Army was engaged in the NFD.

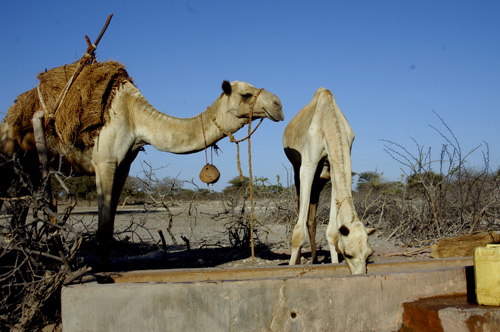
The shiftas raided cattle, including camels, during the conflict.

One immediate consequence of the Shifta insurgency was the signing in 1964 of a Mutual Defense Treaty between Jomo Kenyatta's administration and the government of Ethiopian Emperor Haile Selassie. The outbreak of war between Ethiopia and Somalia further limited the flow of weapons to the shifta, and thus in the latter part of the year the shiftas became more embroiled in local community conflicts and engaged in typical "criminal" activity. This new phase led Kenyan intelligence personnel to create three categories of shifta violence: hit and run attacks by small bands on soft targets, larger attacks on convoys, and cattle theft by "armed tribesmen". By 1965 cattle raids had become predominant in the recorded incidents, making it difficult for Kenyan authorities to distinguish violence from local "tribal" issues with attacks related to the secessionist conflict. This impacted the rebels' popularity which diminished as the rebellion dragged on and the shiftas stole food and other supplies from civilians to keep fighting. In general, the insurgents "eked out a desperate existence", as support from Somalia reached many groups only sporadically.

At the same time, the British influence on the war grew. In March 1964, the Kenyan and British governments signed an agreement to give the latter access to Kenyan airspace and military facilities. Additional defence treaties were signed in the next two years. As a result, British colonial-era officers continued to keep important posts in the Kenyan security forces and administration, impacting their strategy. On one side, this meant that the Kenyan counter-insurgency was inspired by colonial methods, such as those taken by the British during the Mau Mau Uprising, which had been spearheaded by the Kikuyu, who now ironically dominated the KANU-led government. On the other side, however, the British had a moderating influence. The colonial-era counter-insurgencies had been very costly, and the United Kingdom was unwilling to supply Kenya with the money and weaponry to repeat them. Instead the British advisors urged restraint and pushed for less aggressive, more piecemeal tactics which were able to contain, but not defeat the rebels. In this regard, they frustrated Kenyan government officials who tended to support more drastic and oppressive measures to force the Somali minority into submission. However, the limited counter-insurgency also meant that security forces were unable to protect informants or establish supporter networks in the NFD, and generally lacked intelligence to identify rebel supporters. As a result, they resorted to indiscriminate violence against inhabitants of the NFD. Furthermore, the restrained operations also impacted state-building efforts which had been crucial to colonial-era operations; while Kenyatta's government promised modernisation to locals, it invested little.

Over the course of the war, the Kenyan government became increasingly concerned by the growing strength of the Somali military. At independence, Somalia had a weak army of 5,000 troops that was incapable of exerting itself beyond its borders. However, in 1963, the Somali government appealed for assistance from the Soviet Union, which responded by lending money, providing weaponry, and sending trainers. This greatly strengthened the Somali military whose importance also grew in politics. Somali soldiers pressured their government to increase support for the insurgents, and began to directly train shiftas. By 1966, about 1,200 rebels had received training by the Somali military.

=== Government advances ===
By 1966, the shiftas were launching raids into urban centers and making effective use of land mines to ambush the security forces. However, the Kenya Army began to retake territory and adopted a policy of compulsory villagization in the war-affected area to deprive the insurgents of civilian support. Government authorities effectively banned cattle trade, driving many locals into destitution. The disruption of border trading also negatively impacted the economy of Somalia which was already struggling. Furthermore, the idea of Greater Somalia was losing its appeal in Somalia. The Somali government thus began to decrease support for the shiftas.

In 1967, Kenyan fears reached a fever pitch, and a special government committee was created to prepare for a full-scale war with Somalia. Furthermore, the British influence lessened, as Kenyatta's government was now more secure. It believed that it had ensured the armed forces' loyalty through a variety of measures; the Europeans were no longer necessary. Disagreeing with the moderation advocated by the British, the last expatriate officers in the security forces were replaced with Kenyans who favored a more aggressive approach. The United States embassy argued that the removal of the British officers resulted in the Kenya Army and GSU operating with "harsh brutality" in the NFD. In 1967, the populace was moved into 14 Manyattas, villages that were guarded by troops (some referred to them as concentration camps). East Africa scholar Alex de Waal described the result as "a military assault upon the entire pastoral way of life," as enormous numbers of livestock were confiscated or killed, partly to deny their use by the guerrillas and partly to force the populace to abandon their flocks and move to a Manyatta. Thus, made destitute, many nomads became an urban underclass, while educated Somalis in Kenya fled the country. The government also replaced the dynastic Sultans, who were the traditional leaders, with low-ranking government-appointed chiefs. These measures allowed the military and police to launch larger offensives against the rebels.

In an attempt to end the conflict, the Kenyan government offered two presidential amnesties to shiftas in 1967. The first lasted from 1 June to 15 July and led to 340 surrenders. The second, between 20 October and 20 November, led an additional 151 rebels to lay down their arms. The surrenders were facilitated by the efforts of local elders and community leaders, who willingly carried out the government's request to negotiate the shiftas' return to civilian life so as to deescalate the conflict and avoid further burdens being placed on their locales. Administrative officials were ordered to supply the former combatants with rations as a sign of goodwill; in Mandera, the government provided them with a weekly supply of fish and corn meal. Villages also threw parties to welcome surrendered families back into public life. The active shiftas responded by attacking the families of those who had surrendered and stealing their cattle.

=== Ceasefire ===
In June 1967 Muhammad Egal was elected Prime Minister of Somalia. While he supported the unification of Greater Somalia, he sought to end diplomatic confrontation with Kenya. In September an Organisation of African Unity summit was held in Kinshasa, and Kenyan and Somali delegates decided to reach an agreement regarding the NFD. This resulted in another summit held in Arusha, Tanzania on 28 October under the chairmanship of Zambian President Kenneth Kaunda. The governments of both states signed a memorandum of understanding and entailed the suspension of states of emergency in Kenya and Somalia and the full resumption of diplomatic and economic ties between both states. On 23 November, the Kenyan Special Operations Committee announced that it would undertake no new offensive operations in the NFD. Regional security did not prevail until 1969. The Manyatta strategy is seen as playing a key role in ending the insurgency, though the Somali government may have also decided that the potential benefits of a war simply was not worth the cost and risk.

As the remaining shiftas surrendered, few did so with their weapons. Instead, the rebels brought their weapons to Somalia before giving up to security forces in Kenya. Consequently, many formerly rebel-held weapons found their way into the hands of criminals who continued to launch cross-border raids from Somalia to steal cattle, causing continued insecurity.

== Aftermath ==
Government records put the official death toll in the thousands, but non-governmental organizations reported that more than 10,000 people died.

=== Strategic implications ===
Despite the end of the Shifta War, the Kenyan government continued to fear interference by Somalia. Following the 1969 Somali coup d'état by Siad Barre, Kenya initially believed that Somalia and its Eastern bloc allies were resuming the arming of insurgents in Kenya.

The war's end also impacted the Kenya Army. The soldiers had previously focused on battling rebels and operated with relatively high morale as well as a sense of purpose, receiving regular training and new equipment. From 1967, however, the government reduced its support for the military, leaving a growing number of Kenyan soldiers dissatisfied. The Kenya Army was also no longer allowed to exercise in the NFD, leaving the troops frustrated at having "simply not enough to do". This dissatisfaction resulted in unsuccessful coup plots within the Kenya Army. Ultimately, the renewed tensions with Somalia in the 1970s caused the Kenyan leadership to once again request foreign support by Great Britain, the United States, and Israel to improve its military, partially addressing the soldiers' complaints.

=== Local effects ===
Economically, the war in the NFD led to urbanization, the weakening of smaller pastoral herds, and increased poverty and reliance on external aid. Many herders who had lost cattle during the war due to seizures filed complaints seeking compensation for damages from the government, but there is no evidence that these were ever acted upon. By the end of the war, private holdings of small stock and camels in the NFD were greatly diminished, as small stock was increasingly slaughtered to provide food and camel herds were either taken by fleeing herders to Somalia or decimated by tsetse flies. The conflict also strengthened the Kenyan government's view that the NFD's Somalis were foreigners. In 1971, Garissa South MP Abdi Haji Ahmed complained that the central government had not "forgiven" the NFD's residents for the rebellion, and did not "care if [the locals] live or die", pointing at the lack of water supply and schools in the area. Anthropologist John Baxter wrote that within the Isiolo District in 1982, "only a few fortunate ones still maintained themselves through stock pastoralism. Some 40 percent of the Boran and Sakuye of the District had been driven to peri-urban shanty villages in the new administrative townships. There, they eked out a bare subsistence, hanging around the petrol stations for odd jobs, hawking for miraa, making illicit alcohol, engaging in prostitution and the like." Herds maintained in Isiolo District slowly recovered in the years after the war, but as late as 2007 had not yet surpassed their pre-war numbers.

The increased poverty rate and proliferation of arms also led to more crime and banditry. The insecurity remained problematic through the 1990s, and forced herders to have their cattle graze in restricted security zones, increasing their vulnerability to drought. The war thus marked the beginning of decades of violent crackdowns and repressive measures by the police in the NFD, coupled with trumped-up allegations and unsubtle innuendo on the part of the Kenyan media, charging the region's almost-exclusively Somali inhabitants with "banditry" and other vices. The Ogaden War and growing instability of Somalia also resulted in foreign bandits crossing the border to operate in the NFD, causing further insecurity.

The worst abuses by security forces in the NFD took place during the 1980s. A particularly violent incident referred to as the Wagalla Massacre took place in 1984, when the Kenyan provincial commissioner ordered security forces to gather 5,000 men of the Somali Degodia clan onto the airstrip at Wagalla, Wajir, open fire on them, and then attempt to hide their bodies. In the year 2000, the government admitted to having killed 380 people, though independent estimates put the toll at over 2,000.

Not until late 2000 and the administration of Provincial Commissioner Mohammoud Saleh – a Somali—was there a serious drop in violent activities, partially attributable to Saleh's zero tolerance policy towards abuse by security forces. Ironically, Saleh himself was the target of the local police, having been arrested and booked several times. Wearing plain clothes, Saleh was apparently mistaken for an ordinary inhabitant of the NFD.

Ex-NPPPP leader Degho Maalim Stamboul eventually went into exile in Somalia, and only returned to Kenya in the 2010s. He remains one of the few firm supporters of a union of Kenya's northeast with Somalia. By the 2010s, most separatists in northeastern Kenya were instead backing autonomy or proposing a new state, fully independent from both Kenya as well as Somalia, while the concept of Greater Somalia has become fringe view.

== Historiography ==
In contemporary British and Kenyan official documents, the war was referred to as the "NFD dispute" or "Somali question". In Kenya, the phrase "gaf Daba" is frequently used to identify the conflict. It originated as an idiom the Boran people used in their dialect to refer to the events and is literally rendered in English as "the time of stop", but is also translated as "time stopping" or "no-time". The term recalls the Kenyan authorities' use of internment camps, as "daba" was the word the Boran employed to refer to such installations. More generally, it referred to disruption in daily life.

Most historiography on the war has placed an emphasis on the role of Somali nationalism and the rebels' ideal of a Greater Somalia. In turn, it has generally ignored the sectional divisions within the rebels and paid little attention to the participation of Boran and Rendille people in the insurgency. Nene Mburu wrote the only monograph dedicated to the subject.

== See also ==
- Garissa Massacre

== Works cited ==
- Anderson, David M. (2017). "Remembering Wagalla: state violence in northern Kenya, 1962–1991". In Anderson, David M.; Rolandsen, Øystein H. (eds.). Politics and Violence in Eastern Africa: The Struggles of Emerging States. London: Routledge. pp. 120–138. ISBN 978-1-317-53952-0.
- Baker, Bruce (2001). Escape from Domination in Africa: Political Disengagement & Its Consequences. Trenton: Africa World Press. ISBN 9780865438729.
- Behr, Agnes Wanjiru (2018). Border, Identity and (In) Security: The Kenya-Somalia Border 1963-2016 (PhD thesis). United States International University Africa.
- Bloch, Sean (2015). The gaf Daba: Time, Violence, and Development in Mid-Twentieth Century Northeastern Kenya (PhD thesis). University of Wisconsin-Madison. OCLC 1237223292.
- Branch, Daniel (2011). Kenya: Between Hope and Despair, 1963-2011. New Heaven, London: Yale University Press. ISBN 978-0-300-14876-3.
- Branch, Daniel (2017). "Violence, decolonisation and the Cold War in Kenya's north-eastern province, 1963–1978". In Anderson, David M.; Rolandsen, Øystein H. (eds.). Politics and Violence in Eastern Africa: The Struggles of Emerging States. London: Routledge. pp. 104–119. ISBN 978-1-317-53952-0.
- Broch-Due, Vigdis (2005). Violence and Belonging: The Quest for Identity in Post-colonial Africa (1st ed.). London: Routledge. ISBN 9780203499979.
- Hogg, Richard (1986). "The New Pastoralism: Poverty and Dependency in Northern Kenya". Africa: Journal of the International African Institute. 56 (3): 319–333. doi:10.2307/1160687. JSTOR 1160687. S2CID 146312775.
- Khalif, Zeinabu Kabale; Oba, Gufu (2013). "'Gaafa dhaabaa - the period of stop': Narrating impacts of shifta insurgency on pastoral economy in northern Kenya, c. 1963 to 2007". Pastoralism: Research, Policy and Practice. 3 (14): 14. doi:10.1186/2041-7136-3-14.
- Oliver, Roland Anthony, ed. (1963). History of East Africa. Vol. 2. Clarendon Press.
- Weitzberg, Keren (2017). We Do Not Have Borders: Greater Somalia and the Predicaments of Belonging in Kenya. Athens, Ohio: Ohio University Press. ISBN 9780821445952.
- Whittaker, Hannah (2014). Insurgency and Counterinsurgency in Kenya : A Social History of the Shifta Conflict, C. 1963-1968. Brill. ISBN 9789004282674.
- Whittaker, Hannah Alice (2012). "The Socioeconomic Dynamics of the Shifta Conflict in Kenya, c. 1963—8". The Journal of African History. 53 (3): 391–408. doi:10.1017/S0021853712000448. JSTOR 23353682. S2CID 162216153.
- de Waal, Alex (1997). Famine Crimes: Politics & the Disaster Relief Industry in Africa. African Issues (reprint ed.). Indiana University Press. ISBN 9780253211583.
- "April 1964 - Border Incidents, State of Emergency in Kenya North-Eastern Region, - Regional Elections" (PDF). Keesing's Record of World Events. 10. Keesing's Worldwide, LLC. April 1964.
- Castagno, A.A (1964). "The Somali-Kenyan Controversy: Implications for the Future, c. 1963—8". The Journal of African History. 2 (2): 165–188. doi:10.1017/S0021853712000448. JSTOR 158817. S2CID 162216153.
