= Elgeyo-Marakwet District =

Former district of Kenya

Coordinates: 0°56′54″N 35°30′31″E

Elgeyo-Marakwet District, also referred to as Tambach District during the colonial period, was one of the districts of Kenya, located in the Rift Valley Province. Its capital was Tambach.

== Background ==
In 1902, the region that would later form the Elgeyo-Marakwet District was transferred from Uganda to the East Africa Protectorate. The Elgeyo and Marakwet areas were administered from the Eldama Ravine District of the Naivasha Province. The two regions were transferred to Uasin Gishu District in two phases; Elgeyo in 1913 and Marakwet in 1916. In 1920, they both achieved district status and were separate districts until 1926 when they were merged. In 1934, after a series of boundary alterations over the years, Naivasha Province was absorbed into the Rift Valley Province. Elgeyo-Marakwet was one of the forty districts of Kenya in 1963.

In 1994, Elgeyo-Marakwet District was split into Marakwet and Keiyo districts. In the 2009 census, the two districts had a total population of 369,998.

In 2010, as per the new constitution of Kenya, new counties were to be created based on the districts of Kenya that existed as of 1992. This effectively led to the creation of Elgeyo-Marakwet County. The county became effective in March 2013.
