= Sondu =

- Country: Kenya
- Province: Nyanza Province
- Time zone: UTC+3 (EAT)

Sondu is a small town border town in Kenya's Kisumu County and Kericho County.The boundary between Kisumu and Kericho counties has been contentious for years with original boundary posed to have been behind Sondu Police station which was in Kisumu District until 1992 when it was supposedly moved to Kericho District. It borders Homabay County to the south with river Sondu-Miriu acting as a boundary to the south. It also acts as a transport hub between Kericho, Kisumu and Kisii towns as the Kisumu-Kisii highway passing through it.

Sondu is a pocket of political intolerance and prone to post-election violence in periods of five years when elections are held; with the worst one happening in 1992.

Cattle rustling between the Luos and Kipsigis is almost accepted as a norm with the Government curtailing the same by building Antistock theft Police Station at the border.However talks have been held from both tribes and resolutions are yet to found.
