= South Nyanza District =

Former administrative district in Kenya

Coordinates: 0°31′S 34°27′E

South Nyanza was an administrative district of Nyanza Province in western Kenya. Following territorial transfer from Uganda to the East Africa Protectorate, Kisii District was administered as one unit with Ugaya District both headquartered in Karungu. Kisii was founded in 1907 and quickly rose to be the districts, Kisii and Ugaya, headquarters. At the time the districts were under Kisumu Province, later renamed Nyanza Province in 1909. They were later consolidated and referred to as South Kavirondo. In 1948, South Kavirondo was renamed South Nyanza. In 1961, Kisii District was carved out of South Nyanza. The smaller South Nyanza was then headquartered at Homa Bay.

The district was one of the forty districts recognised in independence Constitution of Kenya. The district returned one member of Parliament to the Senate of Kenya until its abolition in 1966, when it became purely administrative.

In 1992, Migori District was hived off South Nyanza District. South Nyanza disappeared and Homa Bay District was established.

The now defunct South Nyanza District covers the present-day Homa Bay and Migori counties, with its colonial and original form including Kisii and Nyamira counties.
