= Turkana District =

Former district of Kenya

- Former district
- District location in Kenya
- Coordinates: 03°07′31″N 35°35′23″E
- Country: Kenya
- Capital: Lodwar
- Elevation: 1,138 m (3,734 ft)
- Time zone: UTC+3 (EAT)

The Turkana District was an administrative district in the Rift Valley Province of Kenya. It was the northwesternmost district in the country and is bordered by Uganda to the west; South Sudan and Ethiopia (including the disputed Ilemi Triangle) to the north and northeast; and Lake Turkana to the east. To the south and east, neighbouring districts in Kenya include West Pokot, Baringo, and Samburu, while Marsabit District lies on the opposite (eastern) shore of Lake Turkana.

The territory of Turkana District was separated from the Uganda Protectorate in two stages—the southern section in 1902 and the northern region in 1926. In 2013, Turkana County was formally established with boundaries corresponding to those of the former district.

== History ==
Four Stone Age cultural sites are located along tributaries on the west side of Lake Turkana in West Turkana–at Lokalalei, Kokiselei, and Nadung. These sites attracted archaeological interest beginning in 1988.

The earliest Late Stone Age industries date from 12,000 BP.

Colonial influence, in the form of pacification within the district, began in 1900 and ended in 1918.

In 1926, the entire Turkana people were subjugated by the British military, which subsequently restricted their movements to a designated area of Kenya, thereby forcing them to settle in what is now known as Turkana District.

In 1958, the district experienced an influx of individuals identified as members of the Turkana community, who had been expelled from Isiolo Town and forcibly relocated by the British colonial administration.

The district remained almost completely isolated from external influences until 1976, when roadblocks restricting entry were removed.

In 2000, communities in the northern part of the district were reported to be endangered by marauding Ethiopians and were consequently forced to settle in southerly locations.

== Language ==
The region is known in Kenyan as Aturksven.

Some place names in the area are derived from the languages of the Pokot and Samburu peoples, reflecting the historical presence of these communities before their displacement by the Turkana.

== Geography ==
The district was located within the boundaries of the former Rift Valley Province. According to data from 1991, the majority of the population at that time earned their livelihood through farming. Covering an area of nearly 77,000 km^{2}, Turkana is the largest district in Kenya. Its capital is Lodwar, and the district had a population of 450,860 according to the 1999 census.

Irrigation networks in Kekarongole and Katilu were established around or after 1975. According to 1982 data, annual rainfall was recorded as less than ten inches, ranging between 115 mm and 650 mm. Over the 50-year period beginning in 1938, thirteen drought periods were recorded.

== Economics ==
On 26 March 2012, Kenyan President Mwai Kibaki announced that oil had been discovered in Turkana District following exploratory drilling by the Anglo-Irish firm Tullow Oil. He stated,

It is... the beginning of a long journey to make our country an oil producer, which typically takes in excess of three years. We shall be giving the nation more information as the oil exploration process continues.

Gold panning was reported in 2005 at Lochoremoit, Namoruputh, and Ng,akoriyiek.

According to Barrett (2001), as cited in Watson, a person's wealth is traditionally measured in cattle.

Figures from 1998 indicate an average herd size of between 15 and 20.

== District subdivisions ==
Local authorities (councils)
Authority	Type	Population*	Urban pop.*
Lodwar	Municipality	35,897	16,981
Turkana	County	414,963	26,563
Total	–	450,860	43,544
* 1999 census. Source:

Administrative divisions
Division	Population*	Population density	Headquarters
Central	35,919	45	Lodwar
Kaaling	24,053	3	
Kainuk	11,799	7	
Kakuma	97,114	26	Kakuma
Kalokol	28,735	5	Kalokol
Katilu	12,548	10	
Kerio	15,409	6	
Kibish	6,056	–	
Lapur	12,780	6	
Lokichar	21,791	5	Lokichar
Lokichogio	36,187	5	Lokichogio
Lokitaung	22,586	12	Lokitaung
Loima	33,979	10	
Lokori	17,915	3	
Lomelo	6,088	1	Kapedo
Oropol	18,020	3	Oropol
Turkwel	49,881	9	
Total	450,860	7 (average)	–
* 1999 census. Sources:

The district had three constituencies:

- Turkana North Constituency
- Turkana Central Constituency
- Turkana South Constituency
