= Nyandarua District =

Former district of Central Province, Kenya

Coordinates: 0°33′S 36°37′E

Nyandarua District was an administrative district in the Central Province of Kenya. Its capital town was Ol Kalou. Formerly the capital was Nyahururu, but was moved to Laikipia District. Nyandarua District had a population of 479,902 and an area of 3,304 km². The district was located in the northwestern part of the Central Province, west of the Aberdare Range.

The district was split into two in 2007: Nyandarua North District and Nyandarua South District. However with constitution of Kenya, promulgated in 2010, the district ceased to exist. Nyandarua County was created out of the then-abolished Nyandarua District.

Nyandarua county council headquarters were located in Nyahururu town, which was later moved to Laikipia District.

== Demographics ==
Local authorities (councils)
Authority	Type	Population*	Urban pop.*
Ol Kalou	Town	47,795	15,186
Nyandarua	County	432,107	21,868
Total	—	479,902	37,054
* 1999 census. Source:

== Administration ==
Administrative divisions
Division	Population*	Urban pop.*	Headquarters
Kipipiri	78,893	208	Kipipiri
Ndaragwa	85,245	3,594	Ndaragwa
North Kinangop	67,356	4,080	
Ol Joro Orok	65,229	0	Ol Joro Orok
Ol Kalou	98,806	3,881	Ol Kalou
South Kinangop	84,373	3,099	
Total	479,902	14,871	—
* 1999 census. Sources: , ,

== Representation ==
The district had four constituencies:

- Kinangop Constituency
- Kipipiri Constituency
- Ol Kalou Constituency
- Ndaragwa Constituency
