= Cyperus boreobellus =

Conservation status
- Critically Endangered (IUCN 3.1)

Scientific classification
- Kingdom: Plantae
- Clade: Tracheophytes
- Clade: Angiosperms
- Clade: Monocots
- Clade: Commelinids
- Order: Poales
- Family: Cyperaceae
- Genus: Cyperus
- Species: C. boreobellus

Binomial name
- Cyperus boreobellus Lye

Species of sedge endemic to Kenya

Cyperus boreobellus is a species of sedge endemic to Kenya. It is a critically endangered species known from only two locations in the former Kwale District of south east Kenya.

== Taxonomy and history ==
Cyperus boreobellus was described in 1983 by botanist Kåre Arnstein Lye, based on a holotype specimen collected by Robert Bailey Drummond and James Hatton Hemsley in 1953. The description was published in the second issue of volume three of the Nordic Journal of Botany.

== Distribution and habitat ==
Cyperus boreobellus is known from only two locations in the former Kwale District of south east Kenya at 350–400 m (1,150–1,310 ft) above sea level, where it grows in rocky pools and on damp, shallow sandy soil over rocks.

== See also ==
- List of Cyperus species
