= Kajiado District =

Former district of Kenya

Coordinates: 2°S 36.8667°E

Kajiado District was an administrative district in the Rift Valley Province of Kenya. It had a population of 406,054 and an area of 21,903 km². The district bordered Nairobi region and extended to the Kenya-Tanzania border further south. The district capital was Kajiado.

Local authorities (councils)
| Authority | Type | Population* | Urban pop.* |
| Kajiado | Town | 12,204 | 9,128 |
| Olkejuado | County | 393,850 | 71,223 |
| Total | - | 406,054 | 80,351 |
* 1999 census. Source:

The district is divided into seven administrative divisions. The newly created Isinya division is not included in the following table based on 1999 census:

Administrative divisions
| Division | Population* | Urban pop.* | Headquarters |
| Central | 69,402 | 16,444 | Kajiado |
| Loitokitok | 95,430 | 7,495 | |
| Magadi | 20,112 | 0 | Magadi |
| Mashuru | 35,666 | 2,248 | Mashuru |
| Namanga | 35,673 | 5,503 | Namanga |
| Ngong | 149,771 | 20,657 | Ngong |
| Total | 406,054 | 38,299 | - |
* 1999 census. Sources: , ,

There are three constituencies in the district:

- Kajiado Central Constituency
- Kajiado North Constituency
- Kajiado South Constituency

== See also ==
- Amboseli Reserve is in the Kajiado District
- Nyiri Desert, a high proportion of the district lies in the desert
- Kitengela, a plain and a town of the same name in Kajiado District.
