= Narok District =

Former district of Kenya

Coordinates: 1.08333°S 35.8667°E

Narok District was an administrative district in Kenya. The District, located in the Rift Valley Province, and had a population of 365,750. Its capital town was Narok.

Along with Kisii District, Narok District had been identified as having the highest level of practice of female genital mutilation in the country, despite the practice being outlawed in 2001.

Narok was created prior to independence by the colonial government from the Maasai Region. In 1994, Trans Mara District was split from Narok District. In 2013, Trans Mara was reconstituted to form Narok County.

== District subdivisions ==
The district had two constituencies:

- Narok North Constituency
- Narok South Constituency

Local authorities (councils)
Authority	Type	Population*	Urban pop.*
Narok	Town	41,092	24,091
Narok County	County	324,658	2,839
Total	-	365,750	26,930
* 1999 census. Source:

Administrative divisions
Division	Population*	Urban population*	population density	Area (km²)	Headquarters
Central	41,162	22,488	44	935,5	Narok
Loita	15,557	0	9	1728,6	
Mara	41,964	0	9	4662,7	
Mau	77,686	1,898	30	2589,5	
Mulot	68,432	0	95	720,3	
Olokurto	44,326	837	36	1231,3	
Ololulunga	53,828	0	36	1495,2	Ololulungu
Osupuko	22,795	0	12	1899,6	
Total	365,750	25,233	24 (average)	15,263	-
* 1999 census. Sources: , ,
