= Gucha District =

Former district in Nyanza Province, Kenya

Coordinates: 0°14′N 34°16′E

Gucha District was a former district in Nyanza Province, western Kenya. Created in 1998, the district was carved out of Kisii District, making it the second district to do so after Nyamira District. It was also known as South Kisii District or Ogembo District. In 1999, its population was approximately 461,000 people . Its district headquarters were at Ogembo which houses more than a thousand residents (people who live in the centre of the town), with more than one thousand people more that visit it each day.

Agriculture is the main industry. Apart from numerous small family plantations, there are large sugar cane fields. The population is mostly Gusii, but the district borders Maasai land at southeast. There has been some ethnic clashes between them.

The district had three constituencies: South Mugirango, Bomachoge and Bobasi. At the 2002 General elections all three seats were won by FORD-People.

In 2010, the district was eliminated and merged into Kisii County.

Local authorities (councils)
Authority	Type	Population*	Urban pop.*
Ogembo	Town	48,725	1,654
Nyamarambe	Town	40,232	212
Nyamache	Town	38,924	2,205
Tabaka	Town	26,325	5,067
Gucha	County	306,733	1,946
Total	-	460,939	11,084
* 1999 census. Source:

Administrative divisions
Division	Population*	Urban pop.*	Headquarters
Etago	59,652	0	
Kenyenya	92,641	1,857	
Nyacheki	56,998	405	
Nyamache	54,722	1,702	
Nyamarambe	67,060	3,850	
Ogembo	78,827	1,465	Ogembo
Sameta	51,039	0	
Total	460,939	9,279	-
* 1999 census. Sources: , ,
