= Samburu District =

Former district of Kenya

Coordinates: 1°10′N 36°40′E

Samburu District was a district in the Rift Valley Province of Kenya. It covered an area of roughly 21,000 km^{2} (8,000 mi^{2}) in northern Kenya where the Samburu tribe live. The district had a population of 143,547 in the 1999 census. It stretched north from the Wuaso Ng'iro River to the south of Lake Turkana and also includes Mount Kulal which lies just east of Lake Turkana.

The Samburu region was initially administered as part of the Northern Frontier District until 1921 when Samburu District (also known as Maralal District) was created. The district was headquartered at Barsaloi. In 1928, the district was merged with Gurba Tula to form the Isiolo District, only to be separated in 1934 for the former to join Rift Valley Province. In 1935, Samburu and Laikipia were merged within the Rift Valley Province, where they remained in place until 1947 when they were separated. Several merges will follow thereafter until 1962 when Samburu was as one of the districts of Rift Valley of Kenya.

Within Samburu district were the towns of Maralal (capital), Baragoi, Archers Post, South Horr, Wamba and Lodosoit. It also included the Samburu National Reserve and Buffalo Springs National Reserve, Mount Ng'iro, Ndoro Mountains, Mathews Range (Ol Doinyo Lenkiyo), Kirisia Hills, and Loroki Forest.

By the 2000s, the district was non-existent as it had been split into smaller districts of Samburu Central, Samburu East and Samburu West districts. They all had a population of 223,946.

In 2010, after the promulgation of the new constitution of Kenya, counties were to be created based on the districts of Kenya that existed prior to 1992. This effectively led to the creation of Samburu County.

== District subdivision ==
The district had two constituencies: Samburu East Constituency and Samburu West Constituency; two local authorities: Maralal Town Council and Samburu County Council; six divisions: Baragoi, Kirisia, Lorroki, Nyiro, Wamba, and Waso.

== Demographics ==
Historical population
Year	Pop.	±%
1979	76,908	—
1989	108,884	+41.6%
1999	143,547	+31.8%
2005	169,413	+18.0%
2009	223,946	+32.2%
