= Lamu Constituency =

Former Kenyan electoral constituency

Lamu
- Former constituency for the Parliament of Kenya
- District: Lamu District

Former constituency
- Created: 1963
- Abolished: 1966
- Number of members: One
- Replaced by: Lamu East & Lamu West

Lamu was an electoral constituency in Lamu District of Coast Province. Created for the 1963 general elections, it was the only constituency of Lamu District and among the 117 constituencies of independent Kenya. The constituency was abolished in 1966 and split into Lamu East & Lamu West constituencies.
