= Northern Frontier District =

Territory of British Kenya

Northern Frontier District flag

The Northern Frontier Province or Northern Province, or initially referred to as 'Northern Frontier District' (NFD) was one of the provinces of British Kenya. Originally, the Northern Frontier covered the northern region of East Africa Protectorate later succeeded by British Kenya, it later included half of the Jubaland Province that remained as part of Kenya when the other half was ceded to the Italian Empire.

By the late 1920s, the Northern Frontier Province covered nearly half of the colony's territory. The population of the region was estimated to be 65,136 in 1931. It was one of the most underdeveloped region of the colony and was not favoured by settlers due to its arid and semi-arid climate. In 1963, the Northern Province was abolished and its territories spread across three newly created regions of Kenya: Eastern Region, divided into Marsabit and Isiolo districts; Rift Valley covered Turkana District; North Eastern Region contained the Wajir, Mandera and Garissa districts.

Northern Frontier District Region Map

During negotiations for Kenya's independence, Britain granted administration of the whole of the Northern Province to Kenyan nationalists despite an informal plebiscite showing the overwhelming desire of part of the region's population to join the newly formed Somali Republic. The North Eastern Region of the Northern Frontier District is, and has historically been, mostly inhabited by Somalis.

In present-day usage, the NFD refers to the six counties of Kenya that were established out of the six districts created by the colonial government prior to independence.

== History ==
The Northern Frontier Province existed in the East Africa Protectorate as one of nine protectorate's provinces. The formal inception of the administration of the Northern Frontier District commenced in 1909, albeit in an unofficial capacity. This period saw the establishment of stations at Marsabit and Moyale, alongside a police post at Ewaso Ngiro, which was subsequently renamed Archer's Post. Initially, the district was under the nominal jurisdiction of the provincial commissioner of Naivasha Province. However, it was officially recognized in 1910, with its headquarters located at Moyale.

In 1911, the military occupied posts at Loiyangalani near Lake Turkana, followed by Wajir and Gurreh in 1912. In 1915, these posts were subsequently vacated over the ensuing years, with the exception of a new post established at Buna.

In 1916, Bulesa was designated as a sub-district, achieving full district status in 1917/18, with its headquarters at Garba Tula. However, this status was short-lived, as it reverted to a sub-district in 1919/20. The headquarters of the Northern Frontier District were relocated to Meru, Kenia Province, in 1919.

By 1921, with the military administration, Telemugger, with its headquarters at Sankuri, was transferred to the district from Jubaland. The Samburu received a new headquarters at Barsaloi, and the administrative base for Gurreh was established at Mandera in 1923.

At the time under British colonial administration, the northern half of Jubaland Province was ceded to Italy as a reward for the Italians' support of the Allies during World War I. Britain retained control of the southern half of the territory, which was later merged with the Northern Frontier Province

In 1925, the military's role began to diminish, with a partial transition to civil administration, with the exception of Wajir and Mandera, which were civilly administered the following year. The districts of the reorganised Northern Frontier Province included Moyale, Gurreh, Wajir, Telemugger, Garba Tula, Marsabit, and Samburu.

By 1929, the seven districts had been reduced to five: Isiolo, Marsabit, Moyale, Wajir, and Telemugger. The provincial headquarters were subsequently relocated from Meru to Isiolo.

In 1934, the provincial status was withdrawn, and the Samburu were transferred to the Rift Valley Province. Moyale and Mandera were evacuated in 1940, but civil administration was restored the following year.

In 1947, the districts of Turkana and the extraprovincial areas of the Northern Frontier were amalgamated to form the Northern Frontier Province, which included the districts of Turkana, Isiolo, Marsabit, Moyale, Mandera, Wajir, and Garissa. The province was thereafter administered from Marsabit.

=== Dispute between Somalia and Kenya ===
On 26 June 1960, four days before granting British Somaliland independence, the British government declared that all Somali-inhabited areas of East Africa, Greater Somalia should be unified in one administrative region. Which meant Kenya was to cede part of the Northern Frontier. However, after the dissolution of the former British colonies in the region, Britain granted administration of the Northern Frontier to Kenyan nationalists despite an informal plebiscite demonstrating the overwhelming desire of the region's population to join the newly formed Somali Republic as an act of Somali Nationalism, and the fact that majority of NFD was majority inhabited by ethnic Somalis in the North-Eastern region.

In December 1962, at the urging of the Somalia government, the British appointed a commission to ascertain the desires of the inhabitants of the Northern Frontier District regarding its future. The commissioners reported that the inhabitants of five of the six administrative areas of the Northern Frontier District favoured union with the Somali Republic. According to the Somali Republic, unification between NFD and Somalia was favored by 88% of the inhabitants. Early in 1963, Britain assured Somalia that no decision would be made regarding the Northern Frontier without prior consultation with the Republic. However, Britain did not follow the wishes of the overwhelming majority of the inhabitants of the Northern Frontier to cede the territory to the Somalia Republic. Instead, on 8 March 1963, Britain announced the creation of the North Eastern Region out of the Northern Frontier District. Unsatisfied with this solution, the Somali Republic severed diplomatic relations with the United Kingdom on 18 March 1963.

On the eve of Kenya's independence in August 1963, British officials belatedly realized that the new Kenyan regime was not willing to give up the Somali-inhabited areas it had just been granted administration of. Led by the Northern Province People's Progressive Party (NPPPP), Somalis in the NFD vigorously sought union with their kin in the Somali Republic to the north.

=== Shifta war ===
In 1962, Kenya African National Union (KANU) leader Jomo Kenyatta publicly declared that the NFD's future was "a domestic affair of Kenya", and dismissed fears about militant Somali irredentism by telling Somalis in Kenya to "pack up your camels and go to Somalia". At this point, KANU was confident that any Somali uprising could be easily crushed; the party's leaders were more concerned that the British might provide support to possible separatist groups.

The conflict began in the weeks leading up to Kenya's independence, as a few hundred Somalis in the NFD took up arms. Hoping to achieve unification with Somalia through a rebellion, NPPPP supporters formed the Northern Frontier Districts Liberation Movement (NFDLM). The NFDLM was divided into two separate groups, centered around the Hawiye and the Darod clans respectively. The former faction was active between Wajir, Moyale, and Mandera, whereas the latter was led by Maalim Mohammed Stamboul and operated near Garissa and Somalia's southwestern border.Non-Somalis such as Turkana would also join the insurgents; members of these ethnic groups were mostly motivated by the fear of restrictions on their movement and lifestyle imposed by the Kenyan government. Despite the insurgents' differing background and internal divisions, they were united by their opposition to the centralism associated with Kenya. Separatists believed that Somalia would interfere less with their affairs, keeping state control weak and thus maintain the local livelihoods which were adapted to a frontier zone with weak state presence.

The province thus entered a period of running skirmishes between the Kenya Army and Somali-backed NFDLM insurgents. The first high-profile victims were two Borana leaders, the first African District Commissioner Dabaso Wabera and tribal chief Haji Galma Dido, who were assassinated while a route to Isiolo to urge locals not to back the secessionists. The two assassins were Somali residents of Kenya who later escaped across the Somali border. In November 1963 the security situation in the NFD rapidly declined as the shifta began directly attacking police and army personnel. Kenya was granted independence on 12 December, and in response NPPPP militants staged evening attacks on northern police stations and administrative posts. These attacks led the NPPPP leadership to publicly distance itself from the shiftas, and declare that it would work toward a union with Somalia through "constitutional means". This move effectively meant that the party contributed to the delegitimization the insurgents.

Despite their initial successes and substantial local support, the shiftas were too weak in numbers and equipment to defeat the security forces. As a result, a stalemate developed. While the shiftas sometimes traded livestock for firearms from civilians, they were generally reliant on weapons supplied by Somalia. From 1963, Somali state support became "vital" for the insurgency. Thus, in February 1964 rebel activity increased after Somalia had received an arms shipment from the Soviet Union but it declined in March as their supplies ran out. Backed by British troops, the Kenya Army also began a major offensive in that month, though this did not prevent the rebels from staging a major offensive of their own against the town of Marsabit. At this point, half of the Kenya Army was engaged in the NFD.

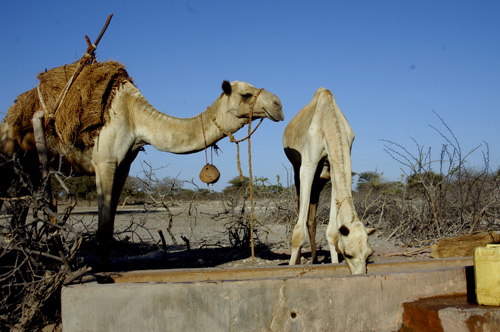
The shiftas raided cattle, including camels, during the conflict.

In response to the former rebellion and Somali nationalist, the Kenyan government enacted a number of repressive measures designed to weaken the somalis and their resolve. Somali leaders were routinely placed in preventive detention, where they remained well into the late 1970s. The North Eastern Province was closed to general access (along with other parts of Kenya) as a "scheduled" area (ostensibly closed to all outsiders, including members of parliament, as a means of protecting the nomadic inhabitants), and news from it was very difficult to obtain. A number of reports, however, accused the Kenyans of mass slaughters of entire villages of Somali citizens and of setting up large "protected villages"—in effect concentration camps, notably the Garissa massacre, Wagalla massacre, and Isiolo massacre, these atrocities by Kenya against the Somali people were never forgotten. The government refused to acknowledge the ethnically based irredentist motives of the Somalis, making constant reference in official statements to the shifta (bandit) problem in the area.

Although the main conflict ended in a cease-fire in 1967, Somalis in the region still identify and maintain close ties with their brethren in Somalia. They have traditionally married within their own community and formed a cohesive ethnic network.

== Population ==
The population demographics in the region was identified as follows by the colonial authorities in the Report of the Northern Frontier District Commission (London, 1962), per district:

District	Tribe	Percentage
Garissa	Somali	72%
Garissa	Orma	7%
Garissa	Riverine	21%
Wajir	Somali	100%
Mandera	Somali	100%
Moyale	Boran and Gabbra	49%
Moyale	Rendille	50.5%
Moyale	El-molo	0.5%
Isiolo	Boran and Gabbra	71%
Isiolo	Somali	19%
Isiolo	Turkana	10%
Marsabit	Boran and Gabbra	49%
Marsabit	Rendille	50.5%
Marsabit	El-molo	0.5%
Total Population: 200,000 - 390,000
