= Migori District =

Former district of Kenya

Coordinates: 0°40′S 34°50′E

Migori District was an administrative district in the Nyanza Province of Kenya. It is located in southwestern Kenya. Its capital town was Migori. The district has a population of 514,897 and an area of 2,005 km^{2}.

In 1992, the district was created after South Nyanza District was split to create an additional district of Migori. The remaining South Nyanza District was later renamed to Homa Bay. Along with the nationwide creation of new districts in 2007, Migori District has been split into two districts: Rongo (North) and Migori (South) districts. The headquarters of Migori District remain in Migori, but those of Rongo District moved to Rongo town. The split occurred between Suba and Uriri Division. However, in 2009 the new districts were declared unlawful.

In 2010, after the promulgation of the new constitution of Kenya, counties were to be created based on the districts of Kenya as at 1992. This effectively led to the creation of Migori County.

Local authorities (councils)
Authority	Type	Population*	Urban pop.*
Migori	Municipality	46,576	31,644
Awendo	Town	93,387	13,760
Rongo	Town	64,528	6,175
Migori County	County	310,406	4,331
Total	-	514,897	55,910
* 1999 census. Source:

Administrative divisions
Division	Population*	Urban population*	Population density	Headquarters
Awendo	90,153	13,509	352	Awendo
Karungu	27,901	3,322	201	Karungu
Muhuru	16,882	0	386	
Nyatike	65,502	0	133	
Rongo	79,817	2,918	376	Rongo
Suba East	91,548	29,825	451	Migori
Suba West	52,876	0	191	
Uriri	90,218	0	237	Uriri
Total	514,897	49,574	257 (average)	-
* 1999 census. Sources: , ,

The district had four constituencies :

- Migori Constituency
- Nyatike Constituency
- Rongo Constituency
- Uriri Constituency
