= Kaptarakwa =

Coordinates: 0°28′N 35°32′E

Kapatarakwa is a village in Elgeyo-Marakwet County, Kenya. Kaptarakwa is located about 37 km from the town of Eldoret in the Kenyan highlands. Kaptarakwa is about 8,000 feet (2,400 m) above sea level. Nearby is the Kerio Escarpment which drops down to 1,000 feet (300 m) above sea level.

Administratively, Kaptarakwa is a location in the Chepkorio division of Keiyo District. In Kaptarakwa Ward (Ward No 0745) the current MCA is Mathew Cheruiyot (Bwana Leng) . The ward comprises Chebior, Kitany, Kaptarakwa, Mokwo, Kaptagat, Kiptulos and Kapkenda sub–locations of Elgeyo Marakwet County.

Mokwo Girls high school lies to its south, Kitany Boys high school to its north. St. Brigid Academy is also located here, Maria Soti Academic Center lies to its northwest. Our Lady of Glory - Kaptagat Girls High School is at the West neighbouring UasinGishu County.

Kaptarakwa open market day is Wednesday of every week. Farmers in this region are small scale, practicing animal husbandry (cows, sheep, goats, poultry and a few donkeys mainly serving as transport beasts). In terms of crops, most horticulture, cereals and animal feed. Agro forestry is well practiced.

Notable natives include Daniel Kibiwot Kiptoo, Daniel Kimutai, Meshack Kiplagat and athletes Albert Chepkurui, Sammy Kipketer, Viola Kibiwott, Jonathan Kandie, Geofrey Kamworor, and Vivian Cheruiyot. Former powerful minister Nicholas Kipyator Biwott was a resident.
