= Trans Mara District =

Coordinates: 1°S 34.8833°E

Trans Mara District was an administrative district in the former Rift Valley Province of Kenya. Its capital town was Kilgoris. The district had a population of 274,532 (2019 census) and an area of 2,846 km^{2}. It was created in 1994, when Trans Mara District was split from Narok District.

The Mara Triangle (part of the Masai Mara reserve) is located in Trans-Mara District. The district had only one local authority, Trans Mara county council. Kilgoris Constituency was the only constituency of the district.

Under the 2010 Constitution of Kenya and the new devolved form of government, the Trans Mara area was merged into Narok County. It continues as the Kilgoris Constituency electorally and administratively.

Its name refers to the territory "across the Mara River" from the perspective of the rest of Narok County. The term "Trans Mara" is still used to refer to the geographical area.

Administrative divisions
Division	Population*	Urban pop.*	Headquarters
Keiyan	25,885	1,277	Enoosaen
Kilgoris	31,827	4,497	Kilgoris
Kirindon	56,197	0	
Lolgorian	25,553	1,410	Lolgorien
Pirrar	31,129	0	
Total	170,591	7,184	-
* 1999 census. Sources: , ,
