= Kisii District =

Former district of Kenya

Coordinates: 0.666667°S 34.75°E

Kisii District was a district in the Nyanza Province in southwestern Kenya. Its capital town was Kisii. The district was created in 1961 by the colonial government from the South Nyanza District. The district is inhabited mostly by the Gusii people. Nyamira District (North Kisii District) was later carved out of Kisii in 1989. In 1998, further splitting led to the creation of Kisii Central District (Central Kisii District) or Kisii and Gucha District (South Kisii District). In 2013, the district's former boundaries as at 1992, except Nyamira District, were effected again to form Kisii County.

== Subdivisions ==
Local authorities (councils)
Authority	Type	Population*	Urban pop.*
Kisii	Municipality	183,000	83,000
Keroka	Town	44,861	3,720
Masimba	Township	40,218	1,666
Suneka	Township	43,908	4,217
Gusii	County	303,551	0
* 1999 and current 2009 census. Source:

Administrative divisions
Division	Population*	Urban pop.*	Headquarters
Keumbu	109,837	8,843	Keumbu
Kisii Town	183,000	83,000	Kisii
Marani	89,215	0	Marani
Masaba	105,926	908	Masimba
Mosocho	63,247	0	Nyakoe
Suneka	86,030	3,723	Suneka
* 1999 and current 2009 census. Sources: , ,

The district had 4 (four) electoral Constituencies:

- Bonchari Constituency
- Kitutu Chache Constituency
- Nyaribari Chache Constituency
- Nyaribari Masaba Constituency

== See also ==
- Gucha District (South Kisii District)
- Nyamira District (North Kisii District)
