= Nyamira District =

Former district of Kenya

Coordinates: 0°45′S 35°00′E

Nyamira District was an administrative district in the Nyanza Province of Kenya. It was split from Kisii District in 1989 and was sometimes referred to as North Kisii District. The district had a population of 492,102 (1999 census). Its capital town was Nyamira.

It was later split into three smaller districts of Nyamira, Manga and Borabu; then later the smaller district of Nyamira was split into Nyamira North and Nyamira South districts. As per the 2009 census, the three districts had a combined population of 486,975.

In 2010, after the promulgation of the new constitution of Kenya, counties were created based on the districts of Kenya as of 1992. This effectively led to the creation of Nyamira County.

== District subdivisions ==
Local authorities (councils)
Authority	Type	Population*	Urban pop.*
Nyamira	Town	65,633	9,971
Nyansiongo	Town	35,413	3,692
Nyamira county	County	397,056	0
Total	-	498,102	13,663
* 1999 census. Source:

Administrative divisions
Division	Population*	Urban pop.*	Headquarters
Borabu	58,079	3,241	Nyansiongo
Ekerenyo	133,967	0	
Manga	75,996	0	Manga
Nyamira	133,920	9,559	Nyamira
Rigoma	96,140	3,395	
Total	498,102	16,195	-
* 1999 census. Sources: , ,

The district had three constituencies:

- Kitutu Masaba Constituency
- North Mugirango Constituency
- West Mugirango Constituency
