= Keiyo District =

Defunct administrative district in the former Rift Valley Province of Kenya

Coordinates: 0.516667°N 35.5°E

Keiyo District (also known as Elgeyo district or Elgeiyo) is a defunct administrative district in the former Rift Valley Province of Kenya. The district was formed in 1994, when the Elgeyo-Marakwet District was split into two — the other half was Marakwet District. According to the 2009 Kenya Population and Housing Census, Keiyo District had a population of 182,875 . Its capital was located in the Iten/Tambach town. In 2010, the districts were re-joined as Elgeyo-Marakwet County.

Local people are mostly of the Keiyo tribe. Many famous Kenyan runners come from the district, including Saif Saaeed Shaheen (born Stephen Cherono), Vivian Cheruiyot and Lornah Kiplagat. The world record marathon holder, Kelvin Kiptum, was also from the region. The area is used by local and foreign athletes for high-altitude training.

Mining of fluorite by the Kenya Fluorspar Company is the largest industry in the former district.

== Local authorities ==
Keiyo District has two local authorities:

- Iten/Tambach town (population: 31,813; urban population: 3,968)
- Keiyo county council (population: 112,052; urban population: 1,868)

== Administrative divisions ==
Division	Population*	Urban pop.*	Headquarters
Chepkorio	67,062	811	Chepkorio (Mosop)
Kamariny	37,773	3831	Iten
Soy	20,354	926	
Tambach	18,676	0	Tambach
* 1999 census. Sources: , ,

== Constituencies ==
The district had two constituencies:

- Keiyo North Constituency
- Keiyo South Constituency

== See also ==
- Kaptarakwa, a village in the Chapkorio division of Keiyo District
- Kimwarer, a town in the Soy Division of Keiyo district
