= Mandera District =

Former District of Kenya

Coordinates: 3.41667°N 40.6667°E

Mandera District was an administrative district in the North Eastern Province of Kenya. Its capital town was Mandera. The district had an area of 26,744 km^{2}.

The district was created in 1923 by the British Kenya military administration. It replaced Gurreh District, created in 1916 which was within the Northern Frontier District but had no headquarters. The district later was administered by civilian control from 1926 until 1929. Between 1929 and 1941, it existed as a sub-district of Moyale District. It reacquired district status in 1941. In 1963, Mandera District was among the three districts that formed the North Eastern Province, absorbing Moyale District.

By the 2000s Mandera District had been split into three districts: Central, Mandera East and Mandera West. In the 2009 census the three districts had a total population of 1,025,756, with Mandera Central- 417,294; Mandera East - 288,687; Mandera West with 319,775. In 2009, the High Court declared Mandera Central, Mandera East and Mandera South, among other districts created after 1992 unlawful, but remained functional as until 2013 when an act of parliament transformed them into sub-counties.

In 2010, the Mandera District's former boundaries before subsequent splits were reinstated to form Mandera County.

The district had three constituencies:

- Mandera Central Constituency
- Mandera West Constituency
- Mandera East Constituency
