= Komarock =

Neighbourhood in Nairobi, Kenya

- Location of Komarock in Kenya
- Coordinates: 1°16′1″S 36°54′32″E
- Country: Kenya
- County: Nairobi City
- Sub-county: Embakasi

Area
  - Total: 1.2 sq mi (3.1 km^{2})

Population (2019)
  - Total: 65,145
  - Density: 54,900/sq mi (21,196/km^{2})
- Time zone: UTC+3

Komarock is a neighbourhood in the Eastlands area of the city of Nairobi. It is approximately 10 kilometres (6.2 mi) east of the central business district of Nairobi.

== Location ==
Komarock is located approximately 10 kilometres (6.2 mi) east of Nairobi's central business district. It borders the Kayole slum.

Komarock is zoned as a commercial and residential neighbourhood. It is more of a lower middle class neighbourhood compared to the neighbouring slum of Kayole. The residential aspect is characterized by mixed housing developments, such as flats, maisonettes, bungalows, and condominiums. Some of these developments form exclusive gated neighbourhoods.

As per the 2019 census, Komarock had a population of 65,145, with a population density of 21,196/km^{2} in a land area of 3.1 km^{2}.
