= Bomet District =

Kenyan administrative district

Coordinates: 0.8°S 35.2333°E

Bomet District was an administrative district in the Rift Valley Province of Kenya. Its capital town is Bomet. The district has a population of 382,794 (1999 census) and an area of 1,882 km^{2}.

In 1992, Bomet District was created after southern regions of Kericho District were hived off to create an additional district. In the 2000s, Bomet Districts was further split to create an additional district of Sotik. All with a combined population of 585,072; the smaller Bomet District with a population of 397,104.

In 2010, after the promulgation of the new constitution of Kenya, counties were to be created based on the districts of Kenya as at 1992. This effectively led to the creation of Bomet County.

Local authorities (councils)
Authority	Type	Population*	Urban pop.*
Bomet	Municipality	42,024	4,426
Bomet County	County	340,770	244
Total	-	382,794	4,670
* 1999 census. Source:

Administrative divisions
Division	Population*	Urban pop.*	Headquarters
Bomet Central	120,759	3,978	Bomet
Longisa	75,550	227	Longisa
Ndanai	37,910	0	Ndanai
Sigor	43,583	0	Sigor
Siongiroi	61,116	0	
Sotik	41,609	0	
Tinet Forest	2,234	0	
Total	382,794	4,205	-
* 1999 census. Sources: , ,

The district had three electoral constituencies:

- Bomet Constituency
- Chepalungu Constituency
- Sotik Constituency
