= Uasin Gishu District =

Former district of Kenya

Coordinates: 0.516667°N 35.2833°E

Uasin Gishu District was one of the districts of Kenya, located in the Rift Valley Province. The town of Eldoret was its capital, administrative and commercial centre. It bordered the Trans-Nzoia District.

The district's origin go back when the region was transferred from Uganda in 1902. The area remained unclassified until 1905 or 1906 when it was admitted to the Naivasha Province as Uasin Gishu District. It contained Trans-Nzoia and later in 1912, when Elgeyo joined, and Marakwet in 1917. In 1919, the colonial authorities split Trans Nzoia from Uasin Gishu District; as Elgeyo and Marakwet, then sub-districts were moved to Suk-Kamasia Reserve. Uasin Gishu and Trans-Nzoia would two years later become extra-provincial territories. In 1929, Trans-Nzoia and Uasin Gishu districts formed Nzoia Province, only for the province to be absorbed into the Rift Valley Province. The two districts will be joined again in 1945, then settled, were split up sometime later in 1949. Uasin Gishu was one of the forty districts of Kenya in 1963

In 1908, fifty eight families of Afrikaans-speaking South Africans "trekked" to the Uashin Gishu plateau from Nakuru after a journey from South Africa by sea and by rail from Mombasa. They were followed by sixty more families in 1911 and more later. The town of Eldoret was established in the midst of the farms they created.

Uasin Gishu was split later in the 2000s into Eldoret East, Eldoret West and Wareng. All the three districts had a total population of 894,189.

In 2010, as per the new law new counties were to be created based on the districts of Kenya that existed as at 1992. This effectively led to the creation of Uasin Gishu County.

== Local authorities ==
| Authority | Type | Population* | Urban pop.* |
|---|---|---|---|
| Eldoret | Municipality | 193,830 | 167,016 |
| Burnt Forest | Town | 30,557 | 3,180 |
| Wareng | County | 398,318 | 15,271 |
* 1999 census. Source:

== Historical ==
In 1903 Theodor Herzl negotiated with British officials to obtain land for a permanent Jewish settlement. The British government eventually offered up the Uasin Gishu plateau, which at the time was part of British East Africa. The British plan for Jewish settlement in this area was eventually aborted.

== Administrative divisions ==
| Division | Population* | Urban pop.* | Headquarters |
|---|---|---|---|
| Ainabkoi | 77,297 | 18,799 | Ainabkoi |
| Kapsaret | 93,162 | 55,056 | Kapsaret |
| Kesses | 84,894 | 0 | Kesses |
| Moiben | 92,717 | 6,172 | Chepkoilel (Moiben) |
| Soy | 165,127 | 46,338 | Eldoret |
| Turbo | 109,508 | 46,900 | Turbo |
* 1999 census. Sources: , ,

== Constituencies ==
The district had three constituencies:

- Eldoret East Constituency
- Eldoret North Constituency
- Eldoret South Constituency
