= Kisumu District =

Former administrative district in Kenya

Coordinates: 0°15′S 34°55′E

Kisumu District was an administrative district of Nyanza Province in western Kenya. Its headquarters was Kisumu. It had a population of 504,359 (as of 1999) and a land area of 919 km². The main industries were subsistence agriculture and fishery on Lake Victoria. Kisumu Town was the main commercial centre in western Kenya. The district was created after Central Nyanza District, renamed from Central Kavirondo District, was in 1968, split into Kisumu and Siaya districts. Kisumu district was split up further. In 2013, Kisumu County was officially effected; all districts that were carved out of Kisumu District after 1992 were reconsolidated into the county.

== Subdivisions ==
Kisumu District had two local authorities (1999 census):

- Kisumu Town (population: 332,024; urban population: 194,390)
- Kisumu County Council (population: 172,335; urban population: 2,687)

== Demographics ==
Administrative divisions
Division	Population*	Urban pop.*	Headquarters
Kadibo	48,934	0	Rabuor
Kombewa	60,183	0	
Maseno	65,304	2,199	Maseno
Winam	329,958	184,243	Kisumu
* 1999 census. Sources: , ,

The district had three constituencies:

- Kisumu Town East Constituency
- Kisumu Town West Constituency
- Kisumu Rural Constituency
