= Kilgoris =

- Town
- Nickname: Killy
- Location in Kenya
- Coordinates: 1.00840°S 34.88001°E
- Country: Kenya
- County: Narok County

Government
  - Body: County government
  - Governor: Robinson Obuya

Kilgoris is a town in Narok County, Kenya with a population of 70,475 as of the 2019 census. Kilgoris is one of two major urban centres in Narok County, the other being the town also named Narok.

== Location ==
The town is located about 60 km west of the Masai Mara National Reserve, which is known for its annual migration of wildebeest. There is a murram road from the town through the neighbouring town of Lolgorien to Mara, another to Enoosaen in the west, and another to Kirindoni through the famous Oloololo gate side of the park. It is an alternative to Narok Road, especially for anyone coming from Western Kenya.

== Economy ==
The town's economy relies on agriculture, trade, and some tourism due to its proximity to Maasai Mara. Farming, especially maize and bean cultivation, plays a significant role in the livelihood of many residents. Sugarcane farming is increasingly becoming the main economic activity due to the proximity of the Trans-Mara Sugar Company and the South Nyanza sugar belt region.

Being in the larger Maasai region, Kilgoris is home to the Maasai people's unique culture and traditions. This includes their jumping dance, vibrant clothing, and pastoralist lifestyle.

Kilgoris has witnessed growth and development over the years. This has included improvement in infrastructure such as roads and accessibility, which facilitates movement and trade. Like many other towns in Kenya and the larger East African region, Kilgoris faces challenges related to economic development, education, healthcare, and infrastructure. The region also contends with periodic droughts which can affect the predominantly pastoralist and agricultural activities.

Kilgoris was previously the capital of the former Trans Mara District. The constituency Member of Parliament for Kilgoris, Julius Ole Sunkuli, initially served from 1992 to 2002 and returned in 2022. Sunkuli was preceded by Gideon Konchella, Ole Sompisha, and John Konchella. Kilgoris is the home of the first Narok County governor Samuel Kuntai Tunai.

Kilgoris has a combination of many religions, including Christians, Muslims, Hindus, and atheists. Kilgoris and its surrounding regions have several schools, both primary and secondary, serving the educational needs of the local community. One notable initiative is The Kilgoris Project. This non-profit organization partners with local leaders to provide education, meals, and medical care to the Maasai children in Kilgoris. The Kilgoris Project runs several schools in the area. Another notable organization in Kilgoris is SOS, one of the largest international evangelism ministries in Africa. Having its headquarters based in the eastern side of Kilgoris, alongside their church called SOS Church Kilgoris. SOS church brings hundreds of internationals towards Kilgoris per year and organizes many events to support the town.

== Notable residents ==
- Billy Konchellah, winner of two consecutive 800m World Championships
- Wycliffe Kinyamal, a two-time Commonwealth Games 800m champion
- David Rudisha, current world record holder and reigning Olympic champion in 800 metres
