= Isiolo District =

Former administrative district of Kenya

Coordinates: 0.883333°N 38.6667°E

Isiolo District was an administrative district in Eastern Province of Kenya, with its capital at Isiolo town.

The district's origin go back to when the Garba Tula and Bulesa areas was carved out of Wajir District, between 1917 and 1918. The district, within the Northern Frontier District, was headquartered at Bulesa shortly before being moved to Garba Tula. The district will later return under Wajir District's administration for five years before civilian administration was restored in 1925. In 1929, the district joined Samburu District to form Isiolo District. In 1934, the Samburu would be transferred to the Rift Valley Province. Isiolo District was one of the forty districts of 1963.

By 2005, Isiolo District had been split into two; the additional district known as Garba Tula. The total population of the two districts stood at 143,294 as per the 2009 census.

In 2010, after the promulgation of the new constitution of Kenya, counties were to be created based on the districts of Kenya that existed prior to 1992. This effectively led to the creation of Isiolo County.

== District subdivisions ==
Isiolo district had only one local authority, Isiolo county council. The district has two constituencies: Isiolo North Constituency and Isiolo South Constituency. The district was divided into six administrative divisions: Central, Garba Tula, Kinna, Merti, and Sericho.
