= Homa Bay District =

Former district of Kenya

Coordinates: 0.683333°S 34.45°E

Homa Bay District was an administrative district in the Nyanza Province of Kenya. Its capital town is Homa Bay. The district had a population of 288,540 (1999 census) and an area of 1,160 km^{2}. The district itself was carved out of the South Nyanza District formerly known as South Kavirondo District. In 2013, the district's boundaries before 1992 were used in the creation of the devolved Homa Bay County.

Local authorities (councils)
Authority	Type	Population*	Urban pop.*
Homa Bay	Municipality	55,532	32,174
Homa Bay County	County	233,008	1,494
Total	-	288,540	33,668
* 1999 census. Source:

Administrative divisions
Division	Population*	Urban pop.*	Headquarters
Asego	76,778	29,315	Homa Bay
Ndhiwa	43,231	1,395	
Nyarongi	41,300	0	
Rangwe	79,263	0	Rangwe
Riana	47,968	0	
Total	288,540	30,710	-
* 1999 census. Sources: , ,

The district had two constituencies:

- Ndhiwa Constituency
- Rangwe Constituency
