= Laikipia District =

Former district of Kenya

Coordinates: 0°5′N 36°40′E

Laikipia District was a district of Kenya, located on the Equator in the Rift Valley Province of the country. The district had two major urban centres: Nanyuki to the southeast, and Nyahururu to the southwest. Its capital was Nanyuki.

After being transferred to the East Africa Protectorate in 1902, Laikipia District was placed under the Naivasha Province until 1921, when it became an extra-provincial districts. In 1929, it was combined with Naivasha Extra-provincial District to form a newer Naivasha Province. In 1934, Rift Valley Province absorbed Naivasha Province this placing Laikipia under the administration of the latter. It was later joined with Samburu District to create a new Rumuruti District headquartered at Rumuruti, until 1947 when the two districts were separated again. In 1963, Laikipia District was one of the forty districts of Kenya.

The Kikuyu formed about 60% of the population, with the balance composed of several other ethnic communities, including Laikipia Maasai, Samburu, Meru, Borana, Kalenjin, Somali, European, Asian, and Turkana, giving the district a diverse population. Most of the land is owned by a small population of old Kenyan settler families, and increasingly non-Kenyan wealthy landowners and international organisations. By the 2000s, Laikipia District had been eliminated and divided into three: Laikipia North, Laikipia East and Laikipia West districts. All the three districts had a combined population of 399,227.

Economic activity in the district consisted mainly of tourism and agriculture, chiefly grain crops, ranching and greenhouse horticulture.

In 2010 per the constitution of Kenya, counties were to be created based on the districts of Kenya that existed as in 1992. This effectively led to the creation of Laikipia County.

The district had two constituencies:

- Laikipia East Constituency
- Laikipia West Constituency
