= Garissa District =

Former district of Kenya

- Former district
- Interactive map of Garissa District
- Coordinates: 00°38′N 33°29′E
- Country: Kenya
- Capital: Garissa
- Elevation: 1,138 m (3,734 ft)
- Time zone: UTC+3 (EAT)

Garissa District was an administrative district in the North Eastern Province of Kenya. The district is one the districts created by the British colonial government as part of the Northern Frontier Province. Its capital town was Garissa. The district had a population of 329,939. The district had an area of 44,952 km^{2}. before the Ijara District was split from it in 2002.

In 2013, Garissa County was formerly effected using the original boundaries of the district prior to the split.

== Demographics ==
Local authorities (councils)
Authority	Type	Population*	Urban pop.*
Garissa	Municipality	65,881	50,955
Garissa County	County	264,058	14,820
Total	-	329,939	65,775
* 1999 census. Source:

Administrative divisions
Division	Population*	Pop. density*	Area (km^{2})	Headquarters
Balambala	13,071	7	1867,3	
Benane	13,381	16	836,3	Benane
Bura	13,009	2	6504,5	
Central	70,791	82	863,3	Garissa
Dadaab	103,671	29	4505,9	Dadaab
Danyere	8,652	8	1081,5	
Jarajilla	50,455	6	8409,2	Alinjugur
Liboi	17,140	5	3428,0	Liboi
Modogashe	14,656	7	2093,7	Mado Gashi
Sankuri	11,713	6	1952,2	
Shant-Abak	13,329	4	3332,3	
Total	329,868	-	34874,2	-
* 1999 census. Sources:

Garissa district had three constituencies:

- Dujis Constituency
- Fafi Constituency
- Lagdera Constituency

== See also ==
Garissa County
