= Kacheliba =

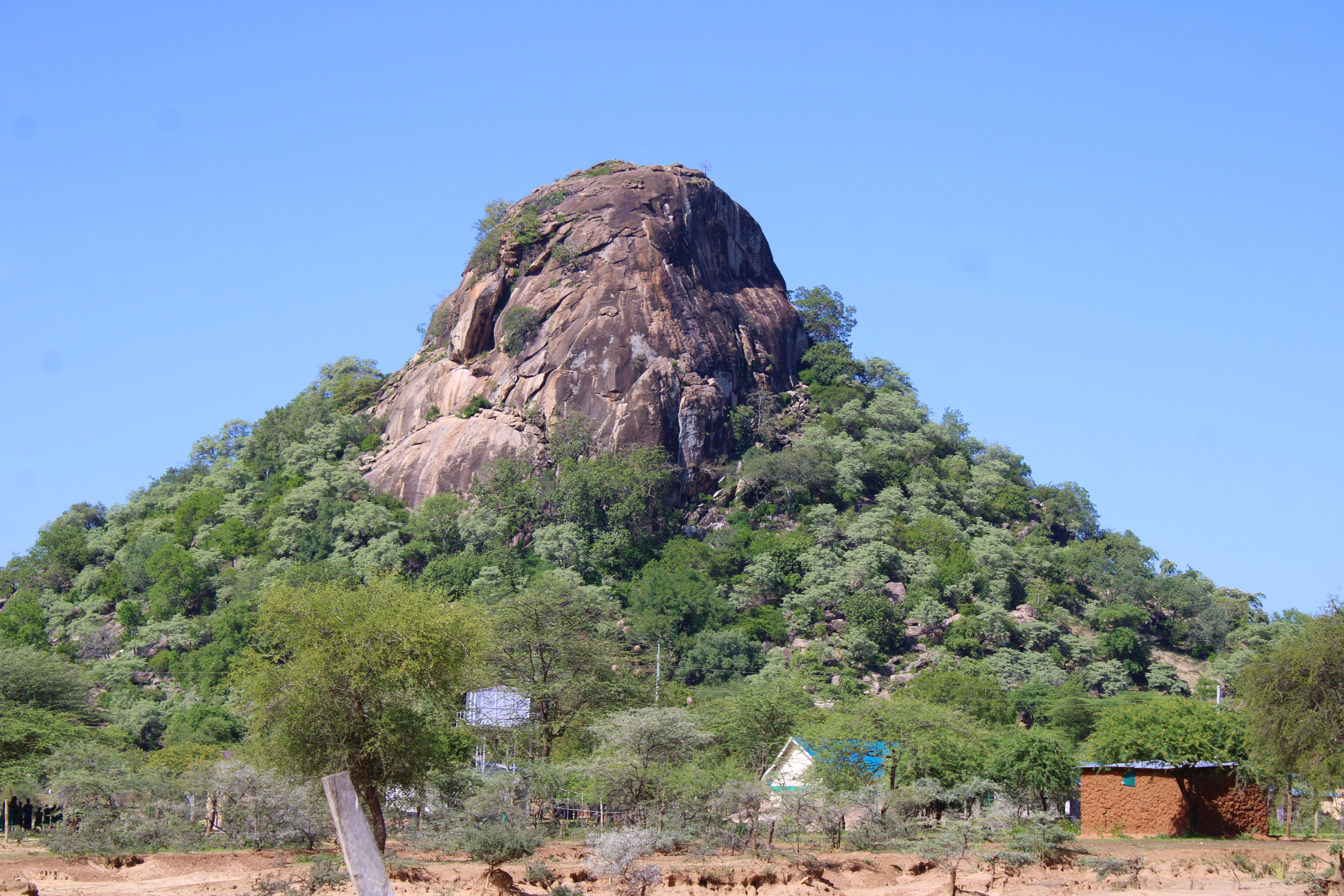

- Location within Kenya
- Coordinates: 1.28°N 35.02°E
- Country: Kenya
- Province: Rift Valley Province
- Time zone: UTC+3 (EAT)

Kacheliba is a small town in Kenya's Rift Valley Province within West Pokot County. It was the original colonial (British) capital of this county, but due to the heat and malaria, the capital was moved upland to the south to Kapenguria, where it remained. The town is the administrative capital for the Kacheliba sub county in West Pokot county.
