= Kwale District =

Former administrative district in Kenya

Coordinates: 4°10′S 39°27′E

Kwale District was an administrative district in the Coast Province of Kenya. Its capital town was Kwale, although Msambweni and Ukunda are larger. The district was created by the colonial government, making it one of the original districts of Kenya.

The district had a population of 496,133.

Kwale is mainly an inland district, but it has coastline south of Mombasa. Diani Beach is part of the Msambweni division. Shimba Hills National Reserve and Mwaluganje elephant sanctuary are other attractions in the district.

In 2013, Kilifi District was scrapped and replaced with Kilifi County, a devolved form of administration in line with the 2010 constitution of Kenya.

The district had three constituencies:

- Msambweni Constituency
- Matuga Constituency
- Kinango Constituency

Local authorities (councils)
| Authority | Type | Population* | Urban pop.* |
| Kwale | Town | 28,470 | 4,196 |
| Kwale County | County | 467,663 | 62,095 |
| Total | - | 496,133 | 66,291 |
* 1999 census. Source:

Administrative divisions
| Division | Population* | Urban pop.* | Headquarters |
| Kinango | 72,027 | 1,626 | Kinango |
| Kubo | 48,769 | 0 | |
| Matuga | 73,377 | 3,996 | Kwale |
| Msambweni | 211,814 | 55,964 | Msambweni |
| Samburu | 91,011 | 0 | Samburu |
| Shimba Hills | 135 | 0 | |
| Total | 496,133 | 61,586 | - |
* 1999 census. Sources: , ,
