= Kericho District =

Former district of Kenya

Coordinates: 0.366667°S 35.3°E

Kericho was a district in the Rift Valley Province of Kenya. Its capital was Kericho. It had a population of 468,493 (1999 census) and an area of 2,111 km^{2}.

Kericho District traces its origins back to when the region was part of the Protectorate of Uganda. It was until 1902 when Lumbwa District transferred to the East Africa Protectorate. Between 1921 and 1922 it was renamed South Lumbwa District, till 1935 when it was renamed Kericho District. The district was one of the forty districts of 1963. In 1992, It was split to create an additional district of Bomet.

In 2010, the new constitution of Kenya was promulgated. As per the new law, new counties were to be created based on the districts of Kenya that existed as at 1992. This effectively led to the creation of Kericho County.

Local authorities (councils)
Authority	Type	Population*	Urban pop.*
Kericho	Municipality	85,126	30,023
Londiani	Town	37,538	3,996
Kipkelion	Town	36,324	2,479
Kipsigis	County	309,505	2,186
Total	-	468,493	38,684
* 1999 census. Source:

Administrative divisions
Division	Population*	Urban pop.*	Headquarters
Ainamoi	119,696	26,133	Kericho
Belgut	100,325	0	Kabianga
Chilchila	36,983	0	
Kipkelion	64,477	2,369	Kipkelion
Londiani	59,441	4,328	Londiani
Sigowet	61,778	2513	
Soin	25,793	0	
Total	468,493	34,343	
* 1999 census. Sources: , ,

The district had three constituencies:

- Belgut Constituency
- Ainamoi Constituency
- Kipkelion Constituency
