= Baringo District =

Former district of Rift Valley Province, Kenya

Coordinates: 0°40′N 36°00′E

Baringo District was an administrative district in the Rift Valley Province of Kenya. Its capital town was Kabarnet. The district had a population of 264,978 (1999 census) and an area of 8,646 km^{2} (3,338 sq mi). The district was created by the colonial government. In 2013, the district ceased to exist and Baringo County was formally established.

== History ==
The district is named after local Lake Baringo. The colonial government established a gaming reserve was established in 1900.

== Archaeological studies ==
Results of excavations at Ngenyn were reported in 1983.

Kipsaramon sites contained fossil finds are dated to be within 15.8 and 15.5 Ma, and is one of only a few from the middle Miocene within the entirety of Africa. During 2000 the Kenyan Palaeontology Expedition announced the discovery of the remains of what was at the time considered likely a new hominid species, and was stated as the oldest hominid remains found, dated from the surrounding rock as six million years old. The find was named Orrorin tugenensis (Senut et al 2001). Later finds were made in the village of Rondinin in the Tugen Hills. Archaeological remains were recovered from Kipsaramon within the Tugen Hills during 2002.

Chimpanzee fossils reported as the earliest found were reported found in the Kapthurin formation in 2005.

== Government ==
Daniel arap Moi was born in Baringo District during 1924 and the former Kenya president lives in Baringo District.

According to Bollig as a result of British colonizing peaceful relations between tribes were improved.

At a time nearing the independence of Kenya from colonial governorship, the district became part of an amalgamated council including the Nakuru and Naivasha county councils.

== Language ==
The principal spoken is Kalenjin. The main groups of Kalenjin peoples are the Nandi, Terik, Elgeyo, Elkony, Sabaot, Marakwet and the Kipsigis.

Pottery from the district found through archaeology is recognized as having a distinct style, an occurrence understood as necessitated to strengthen tribal differentiation.

== Athletics ==
Some of Kenya's famous runners come from the district, most notably Paul Tergat. Tergat started the Baringo Half Marathon in the area in 2004, and it has been sponsored by Safaricom and featured athletes such as World Championship medallist Mubarak Hassan Shami.

The Kituro athletics camp is located near to Kabarnet in the district.

== Economics ==
The district is estimated to have had during

- 1915; 178'814 cattle, 307'708 sheep
- 1928; 190'968 cattle, 591'235 sheep, 736 camel, 6'673 donkeys
- 1932; 333'584 cattle, 842'345 sheep,1'480 camel, 6'675 donkeys.

The Il Chamus farming area was changed from an efficient and productive grain-producing economy to being reliant on importing by competition from European settlers and other tribes.

The prevalence of cattle raiding amongst the youth and (or) also classified as warrior groups was reported as greater due to the availability of a market for their purchase, and by the encouragement of some authorities (according an unnamed observer) to obtain the cattle specifically for profit and especially for the benefit of so-called cattle warlords.

During the two decades beginning 1902 the British colonial administration collected taxes from the Pokot people. Also as a result of colonial influences trade in the district was improved.

== Geography ==
It is an area of geothermal activity.

Malaria and kala-azar is present within the district.

== Farming ==
European farmers at sometime during the 20th century occupied farming land in Nakuru previously used by Tugen and Il Chamus herders.

The Baringo lowlands were reported during 1992 as an area of land unavailable to farming due to an environmental situation. There are only a few places to obtain water in south Baringo.

During 1921, almost the entire district's land for arable farming was taken by millet and sorgham. This situation changed in 1945 by the replacement of millet by maize as a crop in certain areas caused by promotion of the crop by the then-government.

== District structure ==
The district had three constituencies: Baringo Central, Baringo East and Baringo North.

Local authorities (councils)
Authority	Type	Population*	Urban pop.*
Kabarnet	Municipality	24,661	9,583
Baringo	County	240,317	6,430
Total	-	264,978	16,013
1999 census.

Administrative divisions
Division	Population*	Urban pop.*	Headquarters
Bartabwa	10,815	0	Bartabwa
Barwesa	9,568	0	
Kabarnet	43,283	8,891	Kabarnet
Kabartonjo	33,470	748	Kabartonjo
Kipsaraman	18,427	0	
Kollowa	14,990	0	Kollowa
Marigat	26,923	4,428	Marigat
Mochongoi	11,091	0	
Mukutani	7,520	0	Mukutani
Nginyang	29,164	0	Nginyang
Sacho	11,856	0	Sacho
Salawa	8,258	0	
Tangulbei	19,505	29	Tangulbei
Tenges	10,302	0	Tenges
Total	264,978	14,096	-
1999 census.
