= Kabarnet =

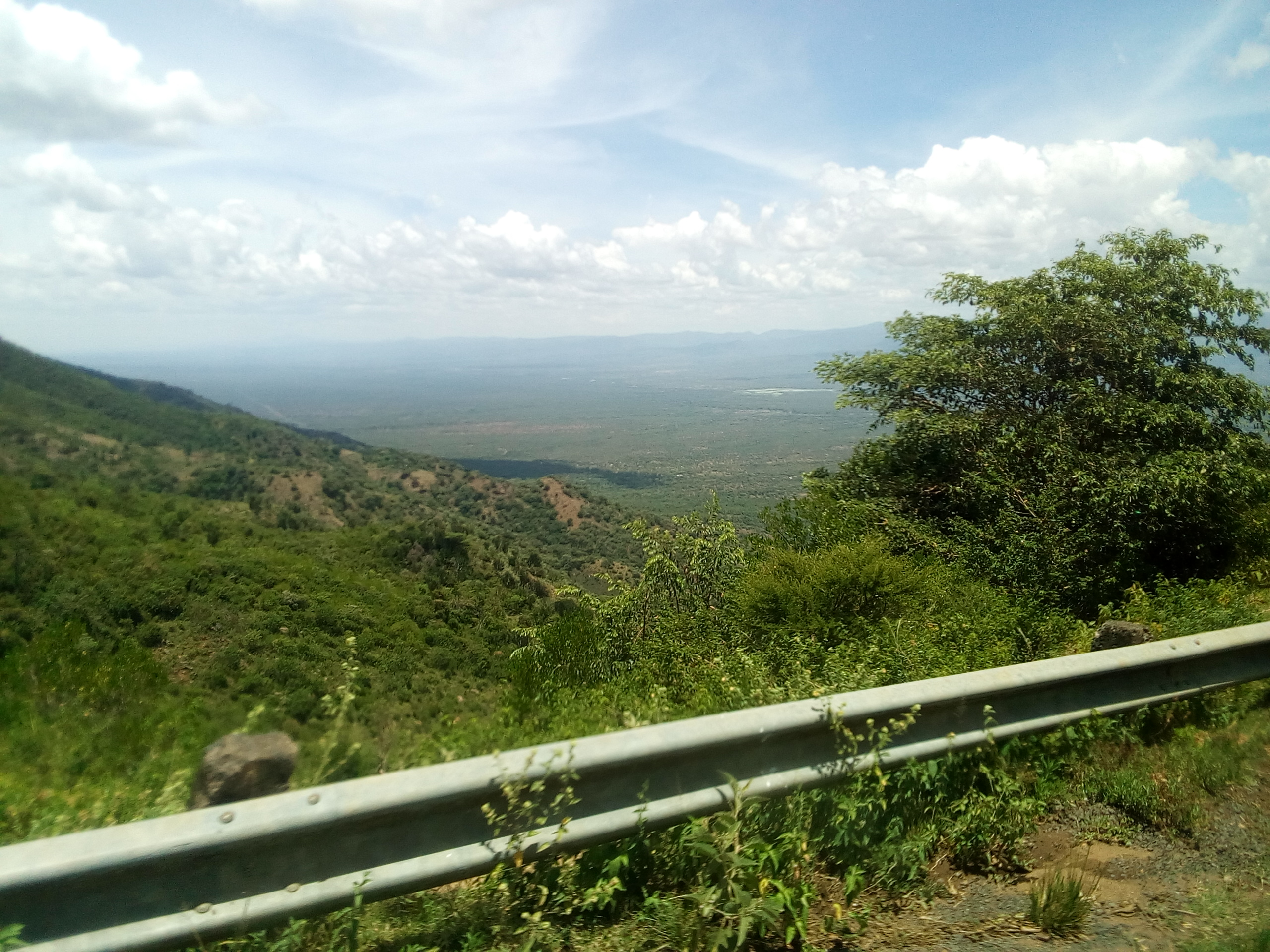
- A mountain road in Kabarnet

- Location within Kenya
- Coordinates: 0.494°N 35.744°E
- Country: Kenya
- County: Baringo County
- Time zone: UTC+3 (EAT)

Kabarnet is a town in Baringo County, Kenya. According to the 2019 census, the town had a population of 22,474 with 10,943 (48.8%) of them being males and 11,531(51.1%) of them being females.

== Geography ==
At an altitude of 1,815 metres (5,957 feet) Kabarnet is located on the eastern edge of the Kerio Valley, it is approximately 138 km north of Nakuru town on the Nakuru-Marigat-Kabarnet road and 89 km east of Eldoret on the Eldoret-Iten-Kabarnet road. The view of Tugen Hills is spectacular along the road heading west from Marigat. Views include east over the Rift Valley towards Lake Baringo and Lake Bogoria, and west to the Elgeyo escarpment and the Kerio Valley.

The Kabarnet area is home to the Samors, a sub-group of the Tugen community.

== History ==
The location is named after a missionary from Australia, Albert Edmund Barnett, who was member of the Africa Inland Mission and came first to central Kenya in 1908. Ka is homestead in the Kalenjin language. The name thus means Barnett's home. Kabarnet is the administrative headquarters for Baringo District since 1907 as the British colonial government made it to seat of the local government. It is also one of the largest constituencies in the country. It became Municipality in 1984. It has had a coat of arms since 1993.

== The Town ==
Kabarnet is the hometown of Daniel arap Moi, former President of the Republic of Kenya. It is represented in Parliament as part of Baringo Central constituency. His son, Gideon Moi, became the Member of Parliament (MP) from 2003 to 2007, and the only MP in the parliament who went in unopposed in the 2002 general elections that saw the father's 24-year presidential reign and the ruling party's 40-year reign come to an end. Sammy Mwaita was elected in the 2007 general election on an Orange Democratic Movement party ticket, and re-elected in March 2013 through the United Republican Party, a member of the Jubilee coalition that won the concurrent presidential poll. Joshua Kandie is the fourth MP for Baringo Central.

The former world marathon record holder, and five time world cross-country champion, Paul Tergat, was born in a small village, Riwa, close to Kabarnet town.

The town has 7 kindergartens, 20 primary schools (with 8 grades), schools for the deaf and handicapped, one Orphanage, three secondary schools, including Kabarnet high school and Kapropita girls high school, and two polytechnics. The town also has a government training institute (Kenya School of Government, Baringo) and Kenya Medical Training College, Kabarnet.

It has also the Kabarnet District Hospital, a slaughterhouse, and a health center.

== Museum ==
The Kabarnet Museum was created in the former residence of the District Commissioner and has in its displays elements from local culture and traditions, as well as information on Lake Baringo and its environment. The gardens surrounding the Kabarnet Museum are so lush that it has become a small botanical park.

== Local governance ==
Kabarnet town is the Baringo County headquarters, with the Governor's office and the County Assembly offices are located within the town. Kabarnet municipality is located in Kabarnet Ward of Baringo Central Constituency. Other wards in Baringo Central Constituency include Kapropita, Ewalel/Chapchap, Tenges and Sacho. Previously Baringo Central had a total of 25 wards belonging to the Baringo County Council, the rural council of Baringo District.

Since 28 June 1988, Kabarnet is twinned with Hürth near Cologne, Germany. There is an active exchange between the two towns. Some of the students of the local school "Friedrich-Ebert Realschule" have penpals in the school of Kabarnet (Kabarnet Hürth Secondary School).
