= Lamu District =

Former district of Kenya

Coordinates: 2°18′0″S 40°42′0″E

Lamu District was a district of Kenya's Coast Province. Its district headquarters was Lamu town. The district covered a strip of northeastern coastal mainland and the Lamu Archipelago. Lamu District had a population of 72,686 in 1999 and its land area is 6,167 km^{2}.

Within Tanaland Province, Lamu District was created in 1897, which included the Lamu Archipelago, some certain coastal areas and the hinterland. The town of was Lamu acted as headquarters for the district and the province. In 1920, Tanaland Province was abolished, and Lamu District, without its hinterland, was transferred to Coast Province. In 1923, Lamu, Tana River and Sultanate of Witu were joined and administered jointly. Tana River reacquired district status in 1927. Lamu and Tana River would be joined in 1935, again between 1944 and 1948. Lamu was one of the forty districts of 1963.

Lamu was one of the few districts that had remained unchanged and was never split after independence. With a predominantly rural population, in the 2009 census, the district had a total population of 101,539, an urban population of 20,238, and a rural population of 81,301.

Lamu district had only one local authority, Lamu county council. The district has two constituencies: Lamu West and Lamu East.

In 2010, after the promulgation of the new constitution of Kenya, counties were to be created based on the districts of Kenya that as at 1992. This effectively led to the creation of Lamu County.

Administrative divisions
Division	Population*	Urban pop.*	Headquarters
Amu	17,310	12,839	Lamu
Faza	7,474	0	Faza
Hindi	7,072	1,335	
Kiunga	3,310	0	Kiunga
Kizingitini	6,010	0	Kizingitini
Mpeketoni	25,530	773	Mpeketoni
Witu	5,980	1,322	Witu
Total	72,686	16,269	-
* 1999 census. Sources: , ,
