= Wajir District =

Former district of Kenya

Coordinates: 1.74722°N 40.0689°E

Wajir District was an administrative district in the North Eastern Province of Kenya. The district was created off the Northern Frontier District by the colonial government prior to independence. Its capital town was Wajir. The district had a population of 319,261 and an area of 55,501 km². Wajir district had only one local authority: Wajir county council. The district had four constituencies: Wajir North, Wajir West, Wajir East and Wajir South.

In 2013, Wajir District ceased to exist and its boundaries formed Wajir County in line with the 2010 constitution of Kenya. This in effect led to the district being absorbed by the new county government.

== District divisions ==
Wajir District was divided into fourteen administrative divisions:

Administrative divisions
Division	Population*	Pop. density*	Area (km²)	Headquarters
Buna	29,160	5	x	Buna
Bute	14,684	20	x	Bute
Central	51,006	22	x	Wajir
Diff	19,052	3	x	
Eldas	9,166	4	x	
Griftu	42,333	6	x	
Gurar	18,087	7	x	Gurar
Habaswein	27,467	6	x	Habaswein
Hadado	19,787	5	x	
Kotulo	23,016	9	x	
Lafaley	5,883	12	x	
Sebule	25,699	3	x	
Tarbaj	22,758	4	x	Tarbaj
Wajir-Bor	17,046	4	x	
Total	319,261	6 (average)	x	-
* 1999 census. Sources:
