= Ol Kalou =

Coordinates: 0.273°S 36.378°E

- Town
- Interactive map of Ol Kalou
- Country: Kenya
- County: Nyandarua County
- Website: nyandarua.go.ke/ol-kalou-municipality/

Ol Kalou is a town in Kenya and the capital of Nyandarua County, formerly part of Central Province. It is located west of the Aberdare Range and about 40 kilometres east of Nakuru. Ol Kalou is connected by road to Gilgil, Nyahururu and Nakuru. Ol Kalou forms a town council and had a population of 47,795, of whom 15,186 were classified urban (1999 census).

Ol Kalou town has five wards: Gichungo, Kaimbaga, Ol Kalou, Ol Kalou Central and Rurii. All of them are located within Ol Kalou Constituency. Ol Kalou is also the administrative headquarters of Ol Kalou Division of Nyandarua Subcounty.
