= Moyale District =

Former district in Kenya

Coordinates: 3°30′59″N 39°04′09″E

Moyale District is a former administrative district in the former Eastern Province of Kenya. Its capital town was Moyale. It had population of 53,479 and an area of 9,390 km^{2} . The district had only one local authority, Moyale county council. The district had one electoral constituency, the Moyale Constituency.

Administrative divisions
Division	Population*	Urban population*	population density	Area (km^{2})	Headquarters
Central	28,294	9,276	62	x	Moyale
Golbo	13,633	0	5	x	
Obbu	8,043	3,538	3	x	Sololo
Uran	3,509	0	1	x	
Total	53,479	12,814	6 (average)	-	
* 1999 census. Sources: , ,
