= Marsabit District =

Former district of Kenya

- Former district
- Interactive map of Marsabit District
- Coordinates: 00°38′N 33°29′E
- Country: Kenya
- Capital: Marsabit
- Elevation: 1,138 m (3,734 ft)
- Time zone: UTC+3 (EAT)

Marsabit District was an administrative district in the Eastern Province of Kenya. Its capital town was Marsabit. The district had a population of 121,478 in 2005.

The district was located in northern Kenya. It borders the eastern shore of Lake Turkana.

The district was created prior to Kenya's independence, carving it out from the then Northern Frontier District. In 2013, based on the original district's boundaries, Marsabit County was effected.

The local authority is Marsabit County Council and the district is divided into six administrative divisions:

Administrative divisions
Division	Population*	Urban pop.*	Headquarters
Central	25,100	10,619	Marsabit
Gadamoji	12,345	0	
Laisamis	24,011	2,817	Laisamis
Loiyangalani	16,965	1,054	
Maikona	19,518	0	Maikona
North Horr	23,539	2,343	North Horr
Total	121,478	16,833	-
* 1999 census. Sources: ,

The district had three constituencies:

- North Horr Constituency
- Saku Constituency
- Laisamis Constituency
