= Kisii, Kenya =

Kisii
- Municipality
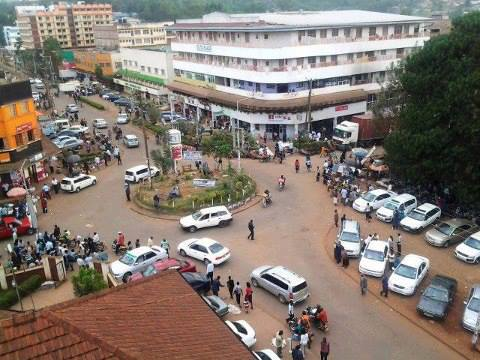
- A roundabout in Kisii Town
- Nickname: Bosongo/Getembe
- Location within Kenya
- Coordinates: 0°41′S 34°46′E
- Country: Kenya
- County: Kisii County
- Sub-counties: Kisii Central, Kisii South & Kitutu Central

Area
  - Municipality: 70 km^{2} (27 sq mi)
- Elevation: 1,700 m (5,600 ft)

Population (2019)
  - Urban: 112,417
- Time zone: UTC+3 (EAT)
- Area code: 058

Kisii (also known as Bosongo) is a municipality and urban centre in south-western Kenya and the capital city of Kisii County. Kisii Town also serves as a major urban and commercial centre in the Gusii Highlands—Kisii and Nyamira counties—and the South Nyanza region and is the second largest town in formerly greater Nyanza after Kisumu City. Kisii municipality sits right at the centre of the western Kenya tourist circuit that includes the Tabaka Soapstone Carvings, Maasai Mara, Ruma National Park and part of the Lake Victoria Basin.

== History ==
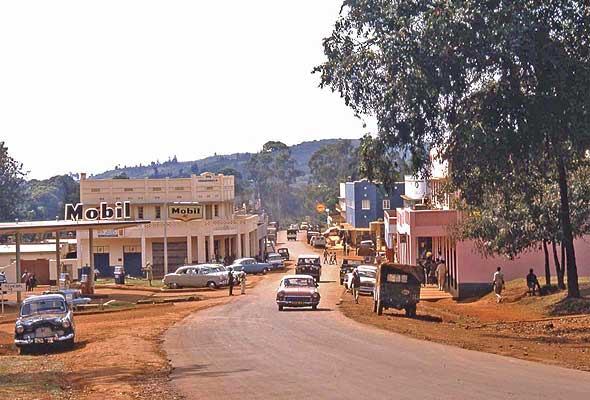
Kisii Town in the 60s

Kisii town was originally known by the Gusii people as Getembe. It was later named Bosongo, it originated from 'Abasongo' (to refer to the British or Whites) who lived in the town during the colonial times. The town was originally established by British soldiers who were being forced to retreat from Lake Victoria by heavy gunfire from German soldiers' gunboats during the Great War in the early 20th century. Later Kisii was chosen to be the District Headquarters of the larger South Nyanza and Kisii region.

== Demographics ==
The town is predominantly inhabited by the Gusii community (also known as the Kisii). The Nubians, Arabs, Luo, Luhya, Kuria, Kikuyu, Kamba, Somali, Asian and Kalenjin make up a minority of residents.

=== Population statistics ===
As of 2019, Kisii town in its location of Kisii Central had a population of 13,422, with 6,839 male and 6,583 female, and a population density of 4,011/km^{2} in an area of 3.3 km^{2}. It is the second most populous town in terms of population density in Nyanza region after Kisumu. The population of the town grew rapidly after the 2007–08 post-election violence. The growth was due to the consideration that the town experienced peace becoming the hub for all communities in the country.

Among Kenya's urban areas, Kisii municipality has a relatively high population density owing to the scarcity of land in the municipality boundaries spurring further expansion of settlement in the outlying area. These alternative settlements have been sanctioned by the municipal government which, in turn, has allowed residents to develop their homes just outside the municipality boundary to alleviate this phenomenon.

== Economy ==
The economy of Kisii town is derived from commerce and agriculture. Crops and fruit cultivated around the area include maize, managu, beans, bananas, pineapples, avocados, pawpaws etc. Cash crops in this area within and outside the municipality include coffee and tea which had been in existence before independence. Coffee processing within the municipality is also carried out. Kisii is the fastest growing town in western Kenya due to its high population, political stability and general tranquility.

There is also food processing, health care, and education industries. Although it has few industrial activities, it has potential for larger agro-based industries due to its location in a rich agricultural area. Soapstone quarrying takes place near the town around Tabaka, southwest of the town and a few kilometres off the Kisii-Isebania Road. Coca-Cola had a bottling and distribution plant in Kisii municipality until 2017 when it was closed. The town hosts large supermarket chains and also hosts commercial banking and financial institutions' branches. Moreover, like many of Kenya's major urban centres, there is an influx of numerous other business ventures such as the hospitality sector with hotels, bars, restaurants, sports pubs, among other commercial activities.

== Government ==
The Kisii County Government runs the town, headed by the governor. The county government headquarters are located in the town. The town hosts Law Courts, Ministry offices, State Law Office branch, among other governmental installations.

== Geography and transportation ==
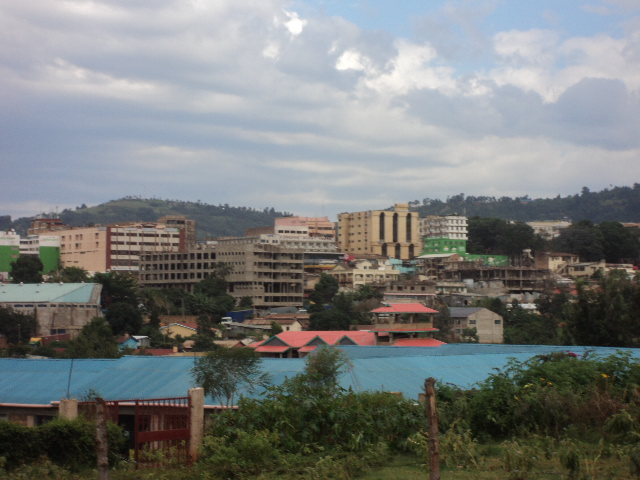
Kisii town as seen from Getembe

Kisii is located in western Kenya, on latitude: 0° 41' 0 S and longitude: 34° 46' 0 E. The town is a driving distance of 309 km (192 mi) from the capital city of Nairobi, located east-southeast, on Class B3 all-weather road. Other major urban centre's distances from Kisii town are Kisumu City which is 114 km (71 mi) to the northwest; Nyamira at 23 km (14 mi) to the immediate north; Keroka at 25 km (16 mi) to the east; Kericho at 101 km (63 mi) to the northeast; Kilgoris at 46 km (29 mi) to the southeast; Narok at 165 km (103 mi) to the east; and Migori to the south-west 67 km (42 mi) which otherwise connects the town to the Kenya /Tanzania border at Isebania town a further 31 km (19 mi) south.

Public transportation, which is operated privately, is available throughout the town. A good example is private-owned taxis (matatus), taxi cabs and 'boda-boda' (motorcycle taxis) as an alternative to privately owned vehicles. Kisii town has one of the most organized bus stations and public transport systems in the country. Buses and matatus are not allowed inside the town.

Air service to Kisii is minimal. However, chartered flights mainly from Nairobi's Wilson Airport transport passengers to Kisii's Suneka Airstrip situated 9 km (6 mi) southwest of the town centre. The facility is underused, but many of the residents especially businessmen, local politicians, and tourists use it for convenience.

From Kisii, it is easy to get to Tabaka Soapstone quarries, the Maasai Mara Game Reserve in Narok County, Lambwe Valley Game Reserve in Homa Bay County, Kisumu, Lake Victoria, and the Kenya/Tanzania or Kenya/Uganda border points.

== Climate ==
Kisii Town experiences a tropical highland climate. Temperatures range from lows of 52°F in July to highs of 79°F in January. The area receives rainfall year-round due to its location within the Lake Victoria basin and the densely forested Kisii highlands. Because of its elevated terrain and surrounding hills, Kisii Town rarely experiences flooding.

Kisii frequently experiences thunderstorms, and an estimated thirty residents die annually due to lightning strikes because of their frequency and partly because many buildings have metal roofs.

Climate data for Kisii, elevation 1,493 m (4,898 ft), (1980–2016 normals)
Month	Jan	Feb	Mar	Apr	May	Jun	Jul	Aug	Sep	Oct	Nov	Dec	Year
Mean daily maximum °C (°F)	26.3 (79.3)	27.4 (81.3)	27.1 (80.8)	25.5 (77.9)	25.1 (77.2)	24.7 (76.5)	24.6 (76.3)	25.0 (77.0)	25.9 (78.6)	25.9 (78.6)	25.1 (77.2)	25.5 (77.9)	25.7 (78.2)
Daily mean °C (°F)	21.1 (70.0)	21.8 (71.2)	21.6 (70.9)	20.7 (69.3)	20.4 (68.7)	19.9 (67.8)	19.7 (67.5)	19.9 (67.8)	20.6 (69.1)	20.7 (69.3)	20.2 (68.4)	20.5 (68.9)	20.6 (69.1)
Mean daily minimum °C (°F)	15.9 (60.6)	16.2 (61.2)	16.0 (60.8)	15.8 (60.4)	15.7 (60.3)	15.1 (59.2)	14.7 (58.5)	14.8 (58.6)	15.2 (59.4)	15.5 (59.9)	15.3 (59.5)	15.5 (59.9)	15.5 (59.9)
Average precipitation mm (inches)	106.9 (4.21)	92.8 (3.65)	186.8 (7.35)	264.8 (10.43)	258.3 (10.17)	164.2 (6.46)	110.8 (4.36)	173.3 (6.82)	165.9 (6.53)	179.0 (7.05)	191.8 (7.55)	134.9 (5.31)	2,029.5 (79.89)
Source: World Meteorological Organization (precipitation 1988–2018)

== Arts ==
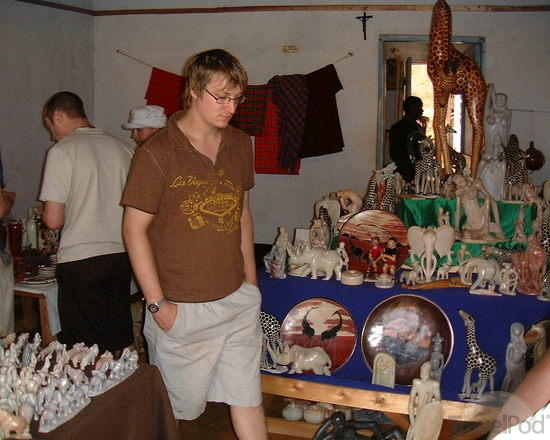
Soapstone carvings shop in Kisii

Soapstone carving is the predominant craft in Kisii. Kisii town is home to the best soapstone carvers in the continent. Their products are very popular in Europe and USA. Kisii is a favourite stopover for tourists who want a taste of the exquisite Kisii carvings. Kisii town is also the venue for the annually held Gusii Cultural Festival, an event focusing on the cultural heritage of the Gusii community.

== Sports ==
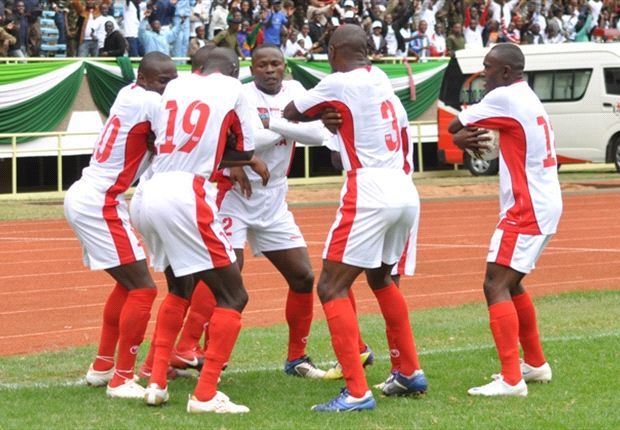
Shabana FC celebrating

Football (soccer) of Kenya Premier League status is played at Gusii Stadium and other surrounding grounds. Shabana Football Club is based in Kisii town; it has been a popular soccer club in Gusiiland and had featured in the Kenya national premier league for many years.

Track sports such as athletics meetings are popular with the town's residents and Gusiiland in general. Such meetings are held during schools' and colleges' sports season in mid year. Other sports in town include volleyball, basketball and netball which attract a diverse participation. Gusii Stadium has been a popular venue for these meetings for many years. Lastly, golf is mainly played by middle- or upper-income residents who are members of the Kisii Golf & Sports Club, a private members' club in the municipality. This trend is one of the remnants of a tradition that was borrowed from former British settlers by the emerging Kenyan Africa-educated and elite. Many towns in the nation host vast golf courses; Kisii is one of them.

=== Parks ===
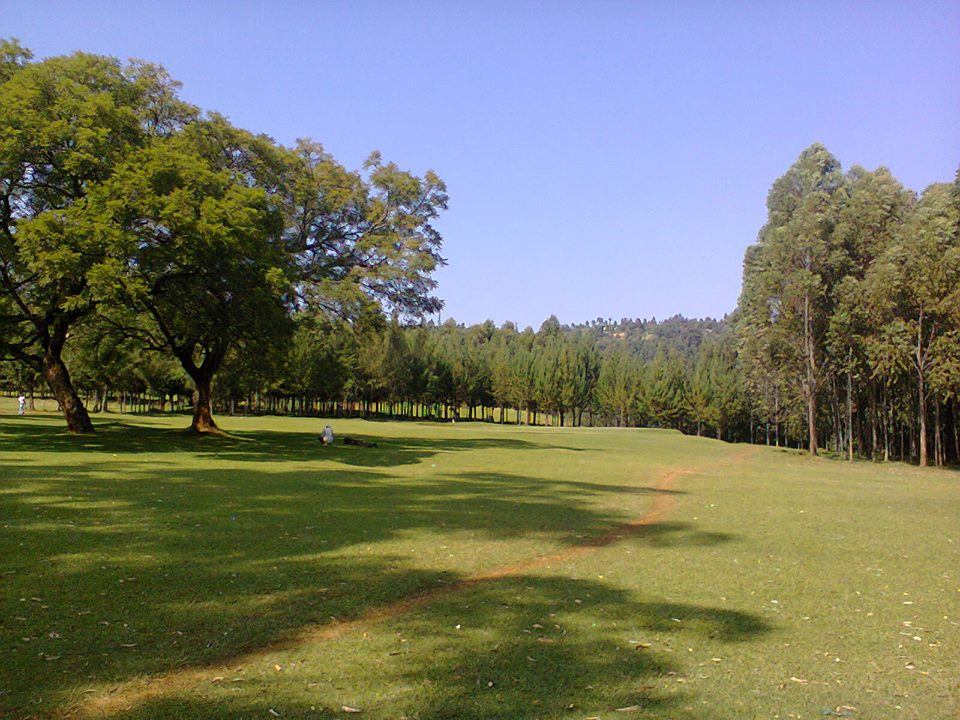
Kisii Golf Course (Erera)

A portion of larger Kisii Golf Club's course was open for public recreation by the local authority for a couple of years. This area was later consolidated back to the golf course. Immediate availability of land for commercial or residential development has been the greatest challenge facing its longtime residents and potential investors. Lately, this impediment has been addressed by the local authority.

Kisii Golf has experienced major challenges from encroachment through illegal farming activities. The area has since been fenced to control public encroachment. As a result, the area has improved and further developed into a bird sanctuary..

The Kisii Sports Club which claims to have responsibility of managing the golf has put up adequate and viable legislation to govern the green space. Enabling the development of local sport talent and often doubling up as a helipad for visitors.

== See also ==
- Mzungu
