= Nyamira =

Human settlement in Kenya

Coordinates: 0.521°S 34.914°E

Nyamira is a town in Kenya. It is the largest town and headquarters of its Nyamira County. It had a population of around 605,576 according to the 2019 Kenya Population and Housing Census The main government hospital is Nyamira District Hospital.

== Notable people ==
- Emily Orwaru, aeronautical engineer
- Boniface Mweresa, sprinter
