= Kajiado =

Kajiado olkeju ado
- Location in Kenya
- Coordinates: 01°51′S 36°47′E
- Country: Kenya
- County: Kajiado County

Population (2019)
  - Total: 24,678
- Time zone: UTC+3 (EAT)

Kajiado is a town in Kajiado County, Kenya. The town is located 80 km (49.7 mi) south of Nairobi, along the Nairobi – Arusha highway (A104 road). Kajiado has an urban population of 24,678 (2019 census). Local people are predominantly of the Maasai tribe but other tribes have settled permanently within the vast county.

Kajiado is the headquarters of Kajiado County.

The name "Kajiado" comes from the word "Olkeju-ado," which means "the Long River" in the Maasai language. The seasonal river named after the town runs from West to the East of the town.

The original name for Kajiado was "Olpurapurana", which means "a round elevation".

== Transport ==
Kajiado has a station on the Magadi Soda Railway line which runs from Konza (on the Nairobi-Mombasa line) to Magadi. However this line operates limited passenger services, the most convenient way to travel to Kajiado from Nairobi is by using a matatu number 134, with NAEKANA sacco dominating the road transport to Kajiado town.

== See also ==
- Railway stations in Kenya
- Chamness Lake
- Anglo-Maasai Treaty (1904)
