= Football Caretaker Committees in Kenya =

Caretaker committees, or entities with associated names, were common in Kenyan football from the 1960s through to 2021, due to government's influence on the running of the game by federations.

== History ==
The first caretaker committee was formed on 13 December 1968, when then Minister for Co-operatives Ronald Ngala cut short John Kasyoka's third term and appointed Johnathan Njenga as chair following disbandment of the Football Association of Kenya. Samuel Ogembo was picked as the next caretaker committee interim chair by Masinde Muliro, Minister for Co-operatives & Social services in October 1970 after elected Bill Martin stepped down following his appointment as a Provincial Commissioner to North Eastern Province.

In between Njenga and Ogembo, Isaac Lugonzo had twice held forte by virtue of being chair of the Kenya National Sports Council (KNSC) to oversee the federation after the same Muliro had kicked out Martin Shikuku in October 1970 and Williams Ngaah in mid 1973. Bill Martin was appointed as the Ad hoc Committee chair in February 1980 by Robert Matano, Minister for Housing and Social Services, after ending Dan Owino's term in office. He quit after 20 days citing interference by the same Matano and was replaced by John Kasyoka on recommendation of KNSC.

Christopher Obure, Matiba's secretary general in the 70's, and Mathews Adams Karauri became the next set of caretaker committee chairpersons in April 1985 and March 1989 after Clement Gachanja and Job Omino were kicked out of office. Philip Kisia chaired one such committee for a week in mid 2002 when Minister of Sports Francis Nyenze put aside Maina Kariuki till the High Court in Kenya overturned his call.

A Stakeholders Transition Committee led by Mike Boit took over after Kariuki's reign in Mar 2004 to fill a vacuum left at the expiry of his term but it led to a FIFA ban leading to the introduction of Kenya's only normalization committee chaired by legend Kipchoge Keino in July 2004.

In November 2006, the then Kenya Sports minister Maina Kamanada formed an eight-member caretaker committee to oversee running of the game a few weeks after a FIFA ban on Kenya. The committee, chaired by Mtana Lewa was overturned by the High Court after less than three weeks in existence.

On 11 November 2011 the then Sports Cabinet Secretary (CS) Ambassador Amina Mohamed disbanded FKF led by Nick Mwendwa and replaced it with the FKF Caretaker Committee to run Kenyan football for a period of six months.

According to CS Amina, her decision was informed after her office received an audit report from the Sports Registrar that cited massive corruption and embezzlement of funds.

The arrival of the FKF Caretaker committee in lieu of duly elected FKF Executive committee did not bode well with World Governing body FIFA who ultimately banned Kenya in February 2022 due to 'third party interference'.

The Caretaker Committee had 15 members, chaired by retired Justice Aaron Ringera, a former Kenya Anti-Corruption Commission boss, with former TV anchor Lindah Ogutu as the head of the secretariat.

The FKF Caretaker committee's mandate expired on 10 May 2022, handed over its report, then reincarnated into another committee by the name FKF Transition Committee on 13 May 2022 for a period of five weeks with the exact same members.

After the five weeks, FKF Transition committee's mandate was extended by another two months till mid August 2022 under new chair General (Rtd) Moses Oyugi, then for a further two months till mid October of the same year.

== Summary ==
Caretaker committee bosses	Tenure	Entity	Notes
Johnathan Njenga	13 Dec 1968-24 Jan 1970	KFA Caretaker committee	Appointed chair by Ronald Ngala, Minister for Co-operatives
Isaac Lugonzo	7 Oct 1970-16 Oct 1970	Kenya National Sports Council (KNSC)	Onus handed over by Masinde Muliro, Minister for Co-operatives & Social services to organise next election
Samuel Ogembo	14 Oct 1971-15 Jun 1973	KFA Caretaker committee	Appointed interim chair by Masinde Muliro, Minister for Co-operatives & Social services
Isaac Lugonzo	Jan 1974-24 Aug 1974	Kenya National Sports Council (KNSC)	Onus handed over by Masinde Muliro, Minister for Co-operatives & Social services to organise next election
Martin 'Bill' Martin	21 Feb 1980-11 Mar 1980	KFF Ad hoc committee	Appointed chair by Robert Matano, Minister for Housing and Social Services. Quit after 20 days citing interference by the same Matano
John Kasyoka	11 Mar 1980-9 Jan 1982	KFF Caretaker committee	Appointed chair by Kenya National Sports Council (KNSC)
Christopher Obure	25 Apr 1985-12 Oct 1985	KFF Caretaker committee	Appointed chair by Robert Matano, Minister for Culture and Social Services
Mathews Adams Karauri	3 Mar 1989-7 Sep 1991	KFF Caretaker committee	Appointed chair by Paul Ngei, Minister for Culture and Social Services
Philip Kisia	17 May 2002 – 23 May 2002	KFF Caretaker committee	Appointed chair by Minister of Sports Francis Nyenze. High Court overturns it, reinstates Kariuki
Mike Boit	24 Mar 2004-26 Jun 2004	Stakeholder Transition Committee (STC)	Appointed chair by Minister of Sports Najib Balala
Kipchoge Keino	9 Jul 2004-29 Dec 2004	KFF Normalization Committee	Appointed chair by FIFA
Mtana Lewa	3 Nov 2006-21 Nov 2006	KFF caretaker Committee	Appointed chair by Minister for Sports Maina Kamanda. High court overturned it
Justice(Rtd) Aaron Ringera	11 Nov 2021 - 16 Jun 2022	FKF Caretaker Committee	Appointed chair by Cabinet Secretary Amb. Amina Mohamed
General (Rtd) Moses Oyugi	17 Jun 2022-15 Oct 2022	FKF Transition committee	Appointed chair by Cabinet Secretary Amb. Amina Mohamed
