= Football elections in Kenya =

Football leadership in Kenya has shuttled between elected and Caretaker Committees due to a government step-in following, largely, disbandment of the federation for a reason or another.

== History ==
On 18 March 1963 John Kasyoka was elected in an Annual General Meeting to head Kenyan football. The then Nairobi Deputy mayor made history as he was the first native to take charge of Kenya football. He was elected back after a year, on 17 March 1964, to become the first FA boss in post independent Kenya. He was re-elected back for a third term on 30 March 1965. With no elections in the next two years, he stayed on as boss till 13 Dec 1968 when the FA of Kenya was dissolved by the then Minister of Co-operatives Ronald Ngala stating the FA had "completely ignored their responsibilities and involving themselves in petty quarrels emanating from personal clashes".

Martin Shikuku was next elected in Jan 1970 but less than ten months later was hounded out of office by Masinde Muliro, Minister for Co-operatives & Social services. Martin 'Bill' Martin was elected next, unopposed, but stepped down after a year in office following his promotion as Provincial Commissioner (PC) to North Eastern Province. It was Williams Ngaah turn in June 1973 following his election but only till January 1974 after being kicked out by Masinde Muliro.

Kenneth Matiba was elected to office in Aug 1974 under a new entity Kenya Football Federation (KFF) ending the era of Kenya Football Association (KFA). He became the first chair to complete a full four-year term. He did not seek re-election when the next elections were called in Nov 1978 paving way for his rival Dan Owino to assume office. Owino didn't last long as Robert Matano, Minister for Housing and Social Services, disbanded the federation allowing Bill Martin to return as an appointed chair of an Ad hoc Committee, then John Kasyoka on recommendation of the Kenya National Sports Council (KNSC).

Clement Gachanja (Jan 1982) then Joab Omino (Oct 1985) were elected to office but had interrupted terms due to government interference. Omino was to however return in Sep 1991 for a full second term that ended in Feb 1996. Peter Kenneth (Feb 1996-Mar 2000), Maina Kariuki (Mar 2000-Mar 2004) were the next in office. The latter though had a one-week interruption in May 2002 to his time in office after the then Minister of Sports Francis Nyenze appointed a caretaker committee headed by Philip Kisia. It was overruled by the High Court.

Alfred Sambu, who lost to Kariuki in 2000 then assumed office in 29 Dec 2004 only to be ousted by coup led by Mohammed Hatimy in Aug 2005. Hatimy was to be elected in Nov 2008 under a new umbrella, Football Kenya Ltd, and after a full term gave way to Sam Nyamweya in Oct 2011 under Football Kenya Federation.

On 10 February 2016, Nick Mwendwa, then 37 years old, was confirmed as the Federation boss beating his closest challenger Ambrose Rachier 50 to 27 votes at Kasarani Annex to become the 14th elected football boss in independent Kenya. That election, the 18th in the last 55 years, was organized by the Electoral Board and conducted by the Institute of Education in Democracy (IED).

Sam Nyamweya failed to defend his seat after he stepped down minutes to the polls. Nyamweya, together with three other aspirants; former Kenya Breweries and National team midfielder Sammy Sholei, Re-union Chair Evans Gor Semelang'o, and former AFC Leopards Chair Ssemi Aina, all polled zero votes.

Mwendwa successfully defended his seat in the next elections election held on 17 October 2020 after polling 77 of the possible 85 votes.

In the advent of four year terms from the early 70s, Mwendwa became only the first Kenyan football chief to be re-elected back to office after a full uninterrupted term. Though Job Omino achieved a re-election in 1991, his first term in office, after being elected on 12 Oct 1985, was marred by a government dissolution of the federation on 3 March 1989. He later reclaimed his seat following an election ordered by the former Kenya President Daniel arap Moi on 7 September 1991. He went on to complete a full term.

On 9 December 2024, Hussein Mohammed was elected as the new FKF President after second round of polling at the Kasarani Gymnasium.

== Summary ==
The following is a list of the Kenya football chiefs over time, elected or appointed.

Kenya Football chiefs	Tenure	Entity	Notes
Jimmy Riddel		Kenya Football Association	
Peter Flucker		Kenya Football Association	
George Wallace	8 Oct 1957 - ?	Kenya Football Association	
Gordon John Bell	-	Kenya Football Association	
John Kasyoka	18 Mar 1963-17 Mar 1964	Kenya Football Association	Elected. 1st native to take charge of Kenyan football
John Kasyoka	17 Mar 1964-30 Mar 1965	Kenya Football Association	Re-elected. 1st football boss in post independent Kenya
John Kasyoka	30 Mar 1965-13 Dec 1968	Kenya Football Association	Re-elected once again. Reign ended by Ronald Ngala, Minister for Co-operatives
Johnathan Njenga	13 Dec 1968-24 Jan 1970	Caretaker committee (1st ever)	Appointed chair by Ronald Ngala, Minister for Co-operatives
Martin Shikuku	24 Jan 1970-7 Oct 1970	Kenya Football Association	Elected. Reign ended by Masinde Muliro, Minister for Co-operatives & Social services
Isaac Lugonzo	7 Oct 1970-16 Oct 1970	Kenya National Sports Council (KNSC)	Onus handed over by Masinde Muliro, Minister for Co-operatives & Social services to organise next election
Martin 'Bill' Martin	16 Oct 1970-24 Sep 1971	Kenya Football Association	Elected unopposed. Stepped down after promotion as PC to N.E Province
Samuel Ogembo	14 Oct 1971-15 Jun 1973	Caretaker committee	Appointed interim chair by Masinde Muliro, Minister for Co-operatives & Social services
Williams Ngaah	16 June 1973-Jan 1974	Kenya Football Association	Elected. Reign ended by Masinde Muliro, Minister for Co-operatives & Social services
Isaac Lugonzo	Jan 1974-24 Aug 1974	Kenya National Sports Council (KNSC)	Onus handed over by Masinde Muliro, Minister for Co-operatives & Social services to organise next election
Kenneth Matiba	24 Aug 1974-26 Nov 1978	Kenya Football Federation	Elected. 1st football boss to complete four-year full term
Dan Owino	26 Nov 1978-21 Feb 1980	Kenya Football Federation	Elected. Reign disrupted by Robert Matano, Minister for Housing and Social Services
Martin 'Bill' Martin	21 Feb 1980-11 Mar 1980	Ad hoc committee	Appointed chair by Robert Matano, Minister for Housing and Social Services. Quit after 20 days citing interference by the same Matano
John Kasyoka	11 Mar 1980-9 Jan 1982	Caretaker committee	Appointed chair by Kenya National Sports Council (KNSC)
Clement Gachanja	9 Jan 1982-25 Apr 1985	Kenya Football Federation	Elected. Reign disrupted by Robert Matano, Minister for Culture and Social Services
Christopher Obure	25 Apr 1985-12 Oct 1985	Caretaker committee	Appointed chair by Robert Matano, Minister for Culture and Social Services
Joab Omino	12 Oct 1985-3 Mar 1989	Kenya Football Federation	Elected. Reign cut short by Paul Ngei, Minister for Culture and Social Services
Mathews Adams Karauri	3 Mar 1989-7 Sep 1991	Caretaker committee	Appointed chair by Paul Ngei, Minister for Culture and Social Services
Joab Omino	7 Sep 1991-17 Feb 1996	Kenya Football Federation	Elected. 2nd term
Peter Kenneth	17 Feb 1996-24 Mar 2000	Kenya Football Federation	Elected. Full term
Maina Kariuki	24 Mar 2000-17 May 2002	Kenya Football Federation	Elected.
Philip Kisia	17 May 2002 – 23 May 2002	Caretaker committee	Appointed chair by Minister of Sports Francis Nyenze. High Court overturns it, reinstates Kariuki
Maina Kariuki	24 May 2000-23 Mar 2004	Kenya Football Federation	Completes term
Mike Boit	24 Mar 2004-26 Jun 2004	Stakeholder Transition Committee (STC)	Appointed chair by Minister of Sports Najib Balala
Kipchoge Keino	9 Jul 2004-29 Dec 2004	KFF Normalization Committee	Appointed chair by FIFA
Alfred Sambu	29 Dec 2004-27 Aug 2005	Football Kenya Federation	Elected. Ousted by coup
Mohammed Hatimy	27 Aug 2005-13 Jan 2006	Kenya Football Federation	Appointed acting chair by Naivasha SGM
Alfred Sambu	14 Jan 2006-3 Nov 2006	Kenya Football Federation	Reign ended by Minister for Sports, Maina Kamanda
Mtana Lewa	3 Nov 2006-21 Nov 2006	KFF caretaker Committee	Appointed chair by Minister for Sports Maina Kamanda. High court overturned it
Alfred Sambu	21 Nov 2006-10 Aug 2007	Football Kenya Federation	Returned to office
Mohammed Hatimy	10 Aug 2007- 11 Oct 2011	Football Kenya Ltd	Appointed by FKF GC in Malindi
Sam Nyamweya	11 Oct 2011-10 Feb 2016	Football Kenya Federation	Elected. Full term
Nick Mwendwa	10 Feb 2016-17 Oct 2020	Football Kenya Federation	Elected. Full term
Nick Mwendwa	17 Oct 2020 -11 Nov 2021	Football Kenya Federation	Re-elected. Reign ended by Amb. Cabinet Secretary Amina Mohammed
Justice(Rtd) Aaron Ringera	11 Nov 2021 - 16 Jun 2022	FKF caretaker committee	Appointed chair by Cabinet Secretary Amb. Amina Mohammed
General (Rtd) Maurice Oyugi	17 Jun 2022-15 Aug 2022	FKF Transition committee	Appointed chair by Cabinet Secretary Amb. Amina Mohammed
Nick Mwendwa	9 Sep 2022 - 9 Dec 2024	Football Kenya Federation	Completed second term
Hussein Rashid Mohammed	9 Dec 2024 - current	Football Kenya Federation	Incumbent
