= Kisii School =

School in Kisii, Kenya

Kisii Secondary School
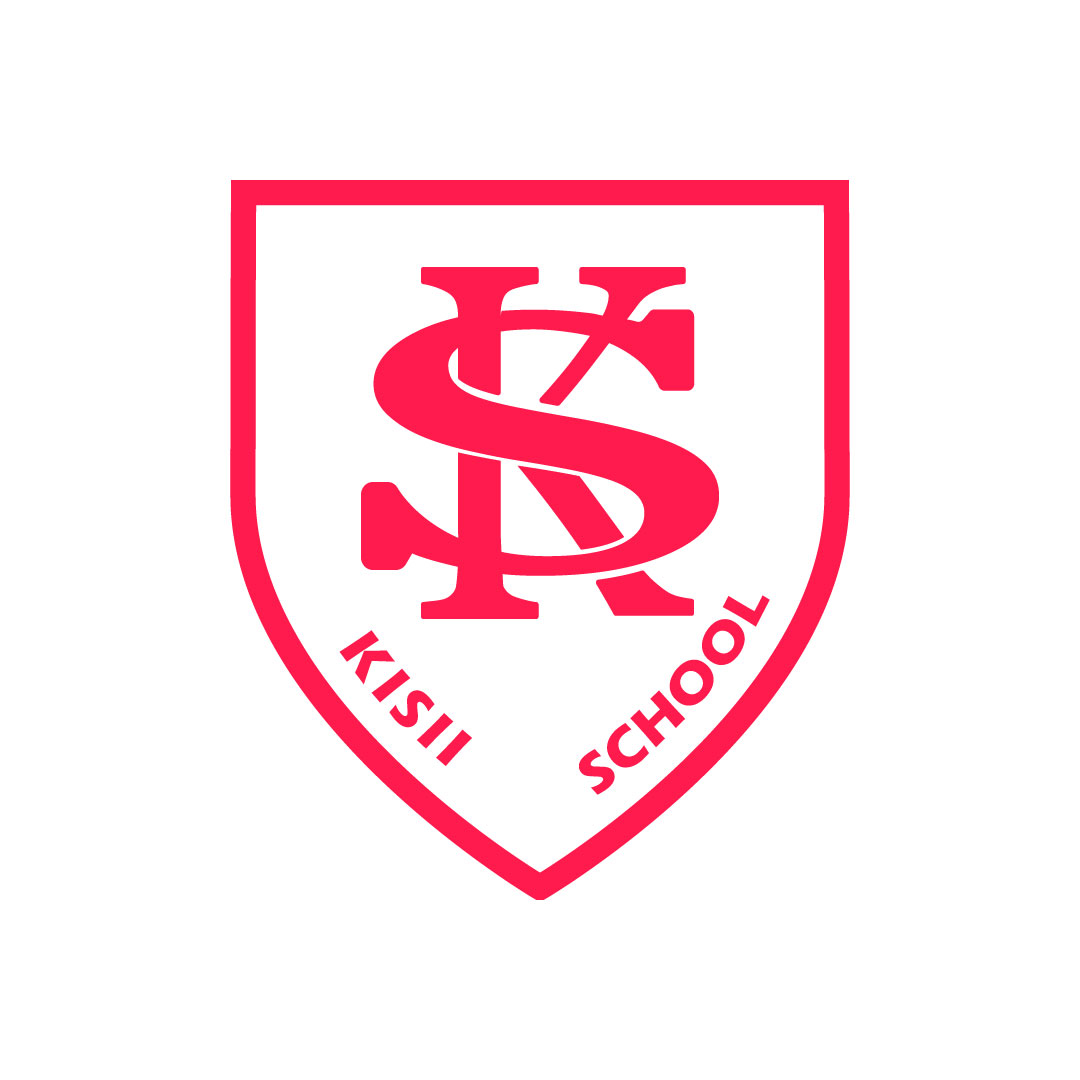
- Motto: Strive For Excellence
- Type: Public
- Established: 1934
- Founder: Young Kavirondo Association
- Chairperson: Reuben Sinange
- Principal: Fred Mogoka
- Administrative staff: >10
- Location: Kisii-Sotik Road B3, Kisii, 40200, Kenya; 0°41′13″S 34°47′04″E
- Colours: dark green, grey, gold
- Website: kisiischool.ac.ke

Kisii School is a public high school for boys in Kisii, Kenya, established in 1934.

== History ==
Kisii School was established in July 1934 under the name "Government African School (GAS) Kisii", following a petition by the local councils for a regional school to Governor Sir Joseph Byrne in 1933. Subsequently, the councils pooled resources to the tune of 120,000Ksh for the establishment of the school on a shared basis. with an additional 3,000KSh for equipment. Land for the school was provided by the then-Nyaribari location chief Musa Nyandusi, just outside Kisii township. Work began in January 1934 and was led by masons from the Kabete Industrial Training Depot. The school began operations in July 1934 Some 300 pupils from across the district were invited to sit an entrance examination for the first class in Standard III, to be admitted in January 1935, competing for 60 slots in the school. The pupils who passed were mainly Luo, from Luo Nyanza, so the district commissioner ordered a retake of the examination to ensure that more Kisii and Kuria pupils would be admitted to the school.

== Timeline ==
- January, 1935 - the first pupils sat in the Standard III class. Charles A. Berridge, a native of Canada, was appointed the first principal of the school. He remained at GAS Kisii until 1939, when he moved to Government African School Kitui.
- February, 1935 - despite intending to keep his promise to attend and announce the school opening personally, Governor Byrne fell ill and canceled at the last minute. He sent the acting Chief Native Commissioner Sydney Hugh La Fontaine to open the school on his behalf. La Fontaine was received by the district commissioner Major J.V. Dawson.
- 1938 - the first candidate for Primary School Examinations was presented. By then, the school had 60 pupils in 2 streams of 30 each. It was mandated that the student base must consist of 50% Kisii students and 50% Luo students.
- 1945 - a secondary school section was opened. At the time, this was called the "Junior Secondary" - equivalent to standard 7 and 8. Each class still consisted of 60 students.
- 1946 - the school presented its first eligible student for Kenya African Preliminary Examination.
- 1949 - a senior secondary section started, consisting of students from the secondary school section. These candidates were to be prepared for KASSE (Kenya African Secondary School Examination).
- 1950 - the school first presented candidates for KASSE (Kenya African Secondary School Examination).
- 1953 - the school admitted candidates for a P3 teacher training course which lasted 3 years. It was later shifted to Kabianga Teachers College (present-day Kabianga University), before moving to present-day Kericho Teachers Training College.
- 1956 - The school entered its first candidates for Cambridge School Certification. A total of 60 students were registered.
- 1962 - The school was among the 6 schools to introduce an 'A' Level (in art), with a single stream of 30 students.
- 1963 - The School [resented its first Higher School Certificate candidates, commonly referred to as A-Level Examination candidates.
- 1967 - The 'A' level science class/science stream was started. By then, the student population was 450 (form 1 to 6).

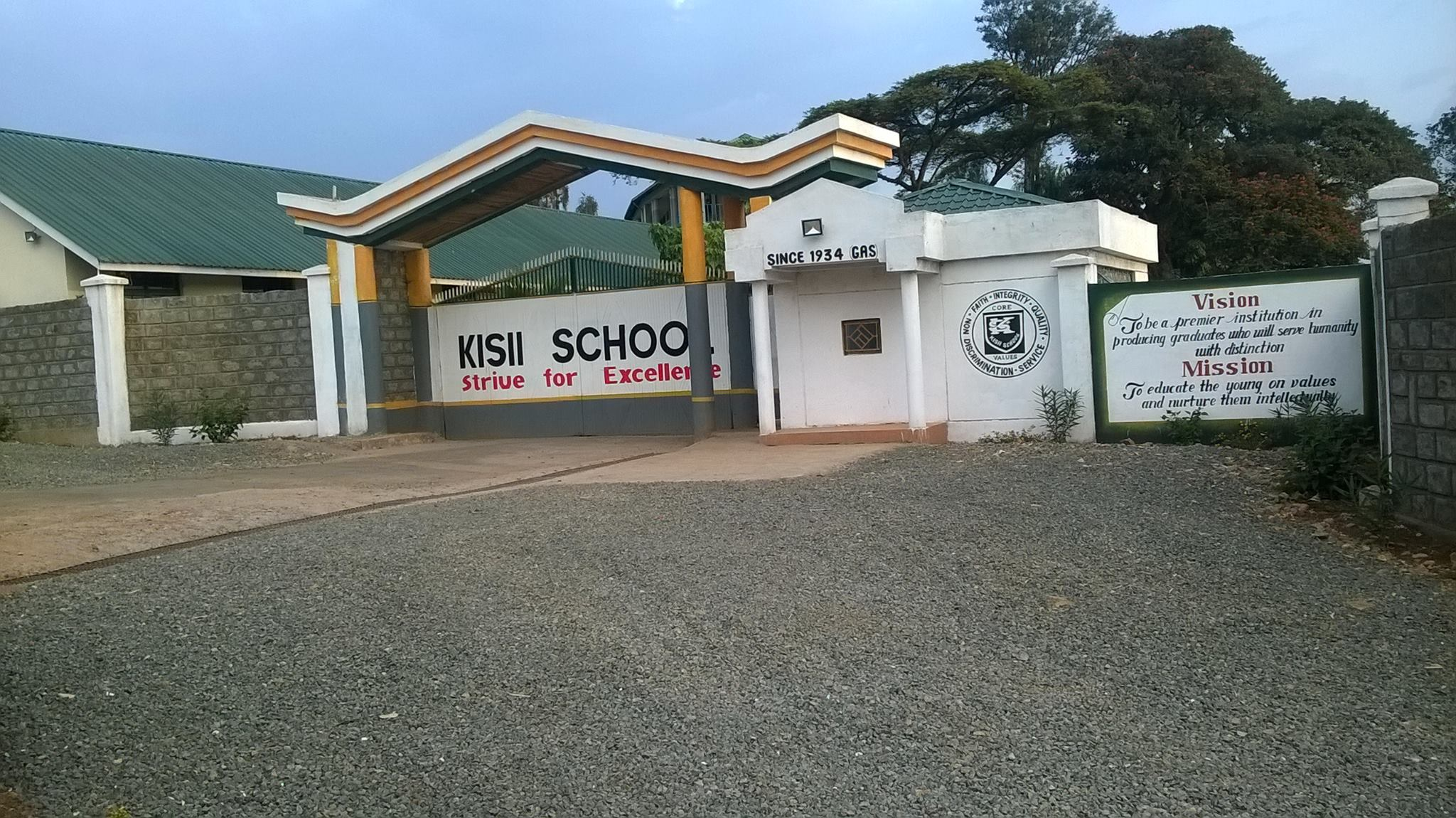
The School gates

== Notable alumni ==
- Cornel Rasanga Amoth - 1st Governor of Siaya County
- Geoffrey Aori Mabea - Chief Executive Officer of the Regional Association of Energy Regulators for Eastern and Southern Africa
- David Maraga - Retired Chief Justice of the Republic of Kenya
- Fred Matiang'i - former Cabinet Secretary in the Government of Kenya
- Ratemo Michieka - former and founding vice-chancellor of Jomo Kenyatta University of Agriculture and Technology.
- John Muiruri - former Belgium 1st division soccer mid-fielder.
- Simeon Mulama - former Mathare United footballer.
- Simeon Nyachae - former Ford People Party chairman and Minister of Roads and Transportation in Kenya; Kenya presidential candidate in 2002.
- George Nyamweya - former nominated Member of the National Assembly.
- Henry Nyandoro - former Shabana Kisii and Kenyan International Footballer
- Christopher Obure - 1st Senator of Kisii County
- Joseph Odero-Jowi, Ambassador of Kenya to the United Nations; Minister for Economic Planning & Development
- Joshua Oigara, former CEO KCB Group Limited and current CEO of Stanbic Bank Kenya and South Sudan
- John Henry Okwanyo - former Cabinet Minister of Commerce & Industry during the Moi regime.
- James Ongwae - 1st Governor of Kisii County
- Richard Momoima Onyonka, Former Assistant Minister for Foreign Affairs and currently serving in the Senate of Kenya as Senator from Kisii County.
- Wycliffe Oparanya - 1st Governor of Kakamega County
- Dalmas Otieno, Former Cabinet Minister and MP for Rongo
- Robert Ouko - Athlete 400 Relay Gold Medalist at the 1972 Munich Olympics
