= 2015 FKF Electoral Board =

To oversee the 2015 football elections, the Football Kenya Federation (FKF) put in place an Electoral Board chaired by renown lawyer Donald Kipkorir. The board worked alongside an FKF Appeals Committee chaired by Aden Mohammed.

Prof. Edwin Wamukoya as chair of verification process, Irene Tindi as secretary, David Mareka as treasurer, Dr J J Masiga, Bernard Njoroge, Steve Mburu, and Naftali Nyambegera were part of the board.

Amidst internal cracks, challenges from FKF itself, aspirants and stakeholders, and a series of cancelations, and postponements, the board eventually oversaw the national elections on 10 Feb 2016 where Nick Mwendwa emerged the winner.

== See also ==
- 2020 FKF Electoral Board
- 2024 FKF Electoral Board
- Football elections in Kenya
