= Gloria Orwoba =

Kenyan politician (born 1986)

Member of the Senate of Kenya
- Incumbent
- Assumed office 2022
- Constituency: Nominated (Women)

Personal details
- Born: May 25, 1986 (age 40) Kisii County, Kenya
- Party: United Democratic Alliance
- Children: 3
- Education: St. George's Girls' Secondary School, University of Nairobi
- Occupation: Politician
- Known for: Advocacy for menstrual health and ending period poverty

Gloria Orwoba (born 25 May 1986) is a former Kenyan UDA politician who has served as a nominated Senator representing women in the Senate of Kenya since 2022.

== Early life and education ==
Orwoba and her three sisters were born on 25 May 1986 in Kisii County, and raised in Nairobi by a single father. Her father was a civil servant and raised his children near the Yaya Centre in the Hurlingham neighbourhood. She attended St. George's Girls' Secondary School in Kilimani before gaining a diploma in architecture from the University of Nairobi; she subsequently obtained a degree in social work and is currently pursuing a degree in leadership and management. In 2015, she moved to Sweden with her family, and subsequently managed a Facebook data centre in Denmark.

== Political career ==
In 2017, Orwoba briefly returned to Kenya in order to run for the Kisii County Executive for the Youth; she was ultimately unsuccessful. Two years later, she moved back to Kenya permanently and stated her intention to run as the United Democratic Alliance (UDA) candidate for the Bobasi constituency in Kisii County. She subsequently lost the primary to a male candidate whom she accused of corruption.

Orwoba worked as a community worker and initiated the Uji Ya Glo Nutrition programme, which provided a cup of porridge and two slices of bread each school day at thirteen primary schools within the Bobasi constituency. As a member of the UDA, she has been an outspoken supporter of William Ruto, the party's candidate in the 2022 Kenyan general election, praising his focus on inclusion and empowerment for all groups within Kenya; she publicly supported his ultimately successful presidential campaign.

Orwoba was chosen to be a nominated Senator in 2022 representing women, in accordance with the Senate having additional Senators representing women, young people, and people with disabilities. As Senator, Orwoba has become an advocate for the rights of women, and has called on the government to do more to respond to the issue of period poverty in Kenya. She has blamed patriarchal power systems in Kenya and a lack of knowledge among men about menstruation as exacerbating the issue of period poverty, citing the fact that condoms are available for free in the country while tampons are often expensive as evidence of this. She has cited the 2019 death of Jackline Chepngeno, a 14-year-old girl from Kabiangek in Bomet County who died of suicide after being period shamed by a teacher, as making her a period poverty activist and making her want to address the taboo around menstruation. In 2023, she tabled a motion calling on the Ministry of Public Service, Gender and Affirmative Action to provide free sanitary products for all schools in Kenya. In addition, she has also requested that all schools be equipped with the correct equipment to dispose of feminine hygiene products.

=== 2023 menstruation incident ===
On 14 February 2023, Orwoba attended a plenary session at the Parliament Buildings wearing white trousers that were stained red in the groin area. During the session, Senator Tabitha Mutinda requested that the Speaker, Amason Kingi, make a ruling on whether Orwoba's presentation constituted a breach of the Senate's dress code. Kingi ultimately ruled that Orwoba needed to leave the chamber and return in clean clothes. The same day, fellow Senator Karen Nyamu had separately been asked to leave the chamber after wearing a sleeveless dress.

Reception for Orwoba's actions have been mixed, and there has been a debate as to whether the incident was an accident or a publicity stunt. Mutinda called Orwoba's presentation "indecent" and accused her of not being a good role model for women and girls. Senator Enoch Wambua called Orwoba's actions "a shame to this house", while Senator Ledama ole Kinaon alleged that Orwoba had faked menstruation to make a political statement. Kingi reiterated that Orwoba had been asked to leave the chamber to give her an opportunity to change her clothes and not due to her being on her period.

Orwoba also received praise for her actions. Johnson Sakaja, the governor of Nairobi City County, called Orwoba's actions "bold and provocative" and promised to promote the availability of free sanitary pads throughout Nairobi. Media personality Janet Mbugua praised Orwoba for "reviving" the period poverty movement in Kenya.

Orwoba has stated she had adhered to the Senate's dress code, and called the staining an "accident" which she had used to raise a point about period poverty and stigma against menstruation in Kenyan society. Immediately after the incident, she visited a school in Nairobi, distributing period products. Orwoba has defended herself against accusations that she faked her period, and has reported that she was a target of Twitter cyberbullying following the incident.

Following the incident, she sponsored a billboard appeared in Nairobi featuring an image of Orwoba in a white T-shirt with the words "Anything you can do, I can do bleeding" on it.

== Personal life ==
Orwoba has three children.
