= Kitutu Chache Constituency =

Kenyan electoral constituency

Kitutu Chache
- Former constituency for the Parliament of Kenya
- District: Kisii District

Former constituency
- Created: 1963
- Abolished: 2013
- Replaced by: Kitutu Chache North and Kitutu Chache South

Kitutu Chache was a former electoral constituency in Kenya. It was formally known as Kitutu West Constituency from 1963 to 1988. It was one of four constituencies in the former Kisii District. It has been divided into Kitutu Chache North Constituency and Kitutu Chache South Constituency, both part of Kisii County.

Former foreign minister Zachary Onyonka was a Kitutu Chache MP. Earlier, he had represented the Kitutu West Constituency that was split before the 1988 elections.

== Members of Parliament ==
Elections	MP	Party	Notes
1988	Zachary Onyonka	KANU	One-party system.
1992	Zachary Onyonka	KANU	Onyonka died during his tenure
1994	Jimmy Angwenyi	KANU	By-elections
1997	Jimmy Angwenyi	KANU	
2002	Jimmy Angwenyi	Ford-People	
2007	Richard Momoima Onyonka	PDP	

== Wards ==
Wards
Ward	Registered Voters	Local Authority
Bogeka	4,067	Gusii county
Daraja Mbili	3,548	Kisii municipality
Kegogi	6,906	Gusii county
Kiamwasi	1,579	Kisii municipality
Kiongongi	1,666	Kisii municipality
Marani	8,888	Gusii county
Mosocho	6,372	Gusii county
Mwamonari	5,740	Gusii county
Ngenyi	10,235	Gusii county
Nyabururu	2,454	Kisii municipality
Nyakoe	5,603	Gusii county
Nyankongo	2,722	Kisii municipality
Nyatieko	3,749	Gusii county
Sensi	4,350	Gusii county
Total	67,879	
*September 2005.
