= FIFA ban on Kenya =

Kenyan football has suffered suspensions by world governing body Fédération Internationale de Football Association (FIFA) on three occasions: 2004, 2006, and in 2022 due to alleged government interference.

== 2004 ==
On 2 June 2004, FIFA banned Kenya for the first time. following the appointment of a Transitional Stakeholder Committee chaired by former athlete Mike Boit by Sports Minister Najib Balala at the expiry of Maina Kariuki's term with Kenya Football Federation.

Slightly over two months later, FIFA lifted the ban from international football during an Emergency Committee meeting in Zurich on 6 Aug 2004 due to formation of a KFF Normalization Committee aimed at resolving Kenyan football problems.

== 2006 ==
On 26 October 2006, FIFA banned Kenya for a second time in two years after its Emergency Committee deemed the country had failed to respect agreements to resolve recurrent problems. Failure to form an 18-team league to replace two independent top flight leagues and disrespect of FIFA's Statutes, regulations and decisions contributed to the ban.

The ban was lifted on 9 Mar 2007 by the same committee following recommendations by the Confederation of African Football (CAF) after a number of sticking points were cleared. They included a declaration by sports minister Maina Kamanda not to interfere in the running of the federation, that the 28 points agreed upon by Kenya Football Federation, and the Kenyan government with FIFA at a meeting in Cairo in January 2006 would be respected in full, and that Mohammed Hatimy would run the KFF on an interim basis as chair.

== 2022 ==
On 11 November 2021, Sports Cabinet Secretary Dr. Ambassador Amina Mohamed dissolved Football Kenya Federation and its executive over allegations of misappropriation of funds and formed a Caretaker Committee led by former Judge Aaron Ringera for an initial period of six months. This led to a ban on Kenya by FIFA on 25 Feb 2022.

The ban was lifted after nine-months, on 28 November 2022, after newly appointed Cabinet Secretary for Sports, the Hon. Ababu Namwamba reinstated the FKF Executive Committee.
