= 2020 FKF Electoral Board =

The 2020 Football Kenya Federation (FKF) Electoral Board, put in place to oversee elections, was made up of five members with Kentice Tikolo as the chairperson, Patrick Onyango as the Secretary, and former referee Alfred Ndinya, media personality Ali Kauleni, and communication expert Sam Karanja as members.

The board was inaugurated on January 28, 2020, for four years, following its ratification and adoption at the January 2020 FKF Special General Meeting (SGM).

The Board was put in place to oversee National and County Elections, with an open hand to appoint an individual or institution to oversee sub-county elections.

== See also ==
- 2015 FKF Electoral Board
- 2024 FKF Electoral Board
- Football elections in Kenya
