= Bobasi Constituency =

Electoral constituency in Kenya

Bobasi
- constituency for the Parliament of Kenya
- County: Kisii County

Current constituency
- Created: 1988
- Number of members: One
- Member of Parliament: Innocent Momanyi Obiri
- Created from: Majoge–Bassi

Bobasi is an electoral constituency in Kenya. It is one of nine constituencies in Kisii County. The constituency was established for the 1988 elections. It was one of three constituencies in the former Gucha District.

== Members of Parliament ==
Elections	MP	Party	Notes
1988	Christopher Mogere Obure	KANU	One-party system
1992	Stephen Kengere Manoti	Ford-K	
1997	Christopher Mogere Obure	Ford-K	
2002	Stephen Kengere Manoti	Ford-People	
2007	Christopher Mogere Obure	ODM	
2013	Stephen Kengere Manoti		
2017	Innocent Obiri Momanyi	PDP	
2022	Innocent Obiri Momanyi	Wiper	

== Wards ==
Wards
Ward	Registered Voters	Local Authority
Emenwa / Nyoera	3,884	Nyamache town
Kiobegi / Gionseri	4,938	Nyamache town
Nyachogochogo	3,297	Nyamache town
Nyantira	2,468	Nyamache town
Mosora	1,753	Ogembo town
Sameta	3,025	Ogembo town
Bobasi Chache	7,896	Gucha county
Bobasi Masige	6,864	Gucha county
Igare	8,617	Gucha county
Maji Mazuri	4,184	Gucha county
Nyacheki	12,039	Gucha county
Nyangusu	6,089	Gucha county
Total	65,054	
*September 2005.

== Nyamache and Sameta Sub-counties ==
Bobasi Constituency has two sub-counties within its boundaries: Nyamache and Sameta. Each sub-county is headed by the Deputy County Commissioner under the Ministry of Interior and National Government.
