= Bomachoge Constituency =

Kenyan electoral constituency

Bomachoge
- Former constituency for the Parliament of Kenya

Former constituency
- Created: 1988
- Abolished: 2013
- Created from: Majoge-Bassi
- Replaced by: Bomachoge Borabu & Bomachoge Chache

Bomachoge is a former electoral constituency in Kenya. It was one of three constituencies in the now defunct Gucha District. The constituency was established for the 1988 elections. It has now been split into Bomachoge Borabu Constituency and Bomachoge Chache Constituency, both in Kisii County.

== Members of Parliament ==
Elections	MP	Party	Notes
1988	Zedekiah Mekenye Magara	KANU	One-party system
1992	Ferdinard Ondambu Obure	Ford-K	
1997	Zephaniah M. Nyang’wara	KANU	
2002	Joel Onyancha	Ford-People	
2007	Joel Onyancha	Ford-People	The seat was declared vacant in March 2009 due to 2007 election irregularities
2009	Simon Ogari	ODM	By-elections
2013	Simon Ogari	ODM	

== Wards ==
Ward	Registered Voters	Local Authority
Central	2,509	Ogembo town
Egetuki	4,148	Ogembo town
Getare	2,017	Ogembo town
Tendere	4,113	Ogembo town
Magena	10,828	Gucha county
Magenche	10,309	Gucha county
Majoge Masaba	9,670	Gucha county
Misesi	4,334	Gucha county
Sengera	9,953	Gucha county
Total	57,881	
*September 2005.
