= Ministry of Education, Science and Technology (Kenya) =

Government ministry of Kenya

The Ministry of Education, Science and Technology is a governmental ministry of Kenya, that is in charge of national policies and programs that enable Kenyans gain access to high-quality, low-cost schooling, post-secondary education, higher education, and academic research. The Kenyan Ministry of Education is mandated by the Kenyan Constitution, Chapter Four, Articles 43, 53, 54, 55, 56, 57, and 59, which include provisions on children's right to free and compulsory basic education, including quality services, as well as access to education institutions and facilities for persons with disabilities who are integrated into society, to the extent compatible with the person's interests.

Its head office is in Jogoo House B', Harambee Avenue, Nairobi, Kenya.

The head of the Ministry has been referred to as a Minister in the past, however in 2017 this title changed to Cabinet Secretary, this in line with the 2010 Constitution of Kenya which allows the government to have 22 ministries.

As of 2019 the director general is Elyas Abdi Jillaow.

== Ministers of Education ==
1. Minister of Education in 1964 – Hon. J.D Otiende
2. Minister of Education, 1964–1967 – Hon. Mbiyu Koinange
3. Minister of Education, 1967 – Hon. Jeremiah Nyaga
4. Minister of Education, 1968–1969 – Hon. J.G Kiano
5. Minister of Education, 1973–1974, 1976–1979 – Hon. Taita Arap Towett
6. Minister of Basic Education, 1975 – Hon. Dr. Zachary Onyonka
7. Minister of Basic Education, 1979 – Hon. Moses Mudavadi
8. Minister of Education, 1980–1985 – Hon. Prof Jonathan Ng'eno
9. Minister of Higher Education, 1980–1983 – Hon. Joseph Kamotho
10. Minister of Education, Science, and Technology, 1986–1989, 1994 and 2001 – Hon. Peter Oloo Aringo
11. Minister of Education and Human Resource Development, 1998–2001 – Hon. Kalonzo Musyoka
12. Minister of Education, 1999–2002 – Hon. Henry Koskey
13. Minister of Education, 2003–2007 – Hon. Prof. George Saitoti
14. Minister of Education, 2008–2012 – Hon. Prof. Sam Ongeri
15. Minister of Education, 2012–2013 – Hon. Mutula Kilonzo
16. Minister of Education, 2013–2015 – Hon. Prof. Jacob Kaimenyi
17. Minister of Education, 2016–2017/Cabinet Secretary for education 2016-2017 – Hon. Fred Matiang'i
18. Minister of Education, 2018/Cabinet Secretary for education 2018 – Hon. Amina Mohammed
19. Minister of Education, 2018/Cabinet Secretary for education 2018–2022 – Prof. George Magoha[4]
20. Minister of Education, 2022/Cabinet Secretary for education 2022–2024 – Hon. Ezekiel Machogu Ombaki
21. Minister of Education, 2024/ Cabinet Secretary for education 2024 – Hon. Julius Migos Ogamba

== Institutions ==
1. Primary and Secondary Education Institutions.
2. Public Universities and Tertiary Institutions.
3. Technical Training Institutes.
4. Youth Polytechnics.
5. National Polytechnics.
