= Ongwae =

Ongwae is a surname, likely of Kenyan origin. Notable people with the surname include:

- James Ongwae (born 1952), Kenyan politician
- Tylor Ongwae (born 1991), Kenyan basketball player
