= Karen Nyamu =

Kenyan politician

Senator Karen Njeri Nyamū

Nominated Senator of Kenya
- Incumbent
- Assumed office 2022
- President: William Ruto
- Deputy: Kithure Kindiki

Personal details
- Born: Nairobi, Kenya
- Party: UDA
- Children: 3
- Occupation: Politician

Karen Njeri Nyamū is a Kenyan politician from the United Democratic Alliance(UDA). She is a nominated member of the Senate of Kenya.

== Early life and education ==
Nyamū was born in the Eastlands area of Nairobi. She studied at Limuru Girls for secondary education. Nyamū graduated from the University of Nairobi with a Bachelors Degree in Law. She then joined Kenya School of Law and studied a diploma in Law. She has a master's degree in International relations.

== Political career ==
Nyamū is a politician and nominated Senator in Kenya. She is also an advocate and owns a law firm, Njeri Nyamū and Co.Advocates. She vied for Nairobi Woman Representative in the 2017 general elections.

On 14 February 2023, Nyamū was asked to leave the parliamentary chamber after wearing a sleeveless dress.

On October 17, 2024, Senator Nyamū voted to impeach deputy president Rigathi Gachagua, calling for political maturity particularly in presidential candidates, placing the blame on president Ruto for picking Rigathi Gachagua. Nyamū also referenced a viral video of her dancing with the same deputy president as evidence that friendship is not a substitute for justice.

== Personal life ==
Nyamū a single mother of three children.

== See also ==
- Grace Nduta
- Richard Momoima Onyonka
