= 2013 Migori local elections =

Local elections in Kenya

Local elections were held in Migori County, Kenya, to elect a governor and county assembly on March 4, 2013. Under the new constitution, which was passed in a 2010 referendum, the 2013 general elections were the first in which governors and members of the county assemblies for the newly created counties were elected. They were also the first general elections run by the Independent Electoral and Boundaries Commission (IEBC), which released the official list of candidates.

== Gubernatorial election ==
| Candidate | Running mate | Coalition | Party | Votes |
|---|---|---|---|---|
| Tom Joseph Mboya Martin | Chacha Maro Samwela | Jubilee | The National Alliance | -- |
| Zacharia Okoth Obado | Nelson Mahanga Mwita | | Peoples Democratic Party | -- |
| Edward Akongo Oyugi | Anne Anyango Omodho | | Orange Democratic Movement | -- |

== Prospective candidates ==
The following are some of the candidates who made public their intentions to run:

- Owiso Ngao
- Mark Nyamita
- Okoth Obado
- Prof Akong’o Oyugi
