= Kinare =

Kinare may refer to:

- Kinare (Tribes), name of sub-tribes in Kenya.
- Kinare language, a Southern Nilotic language cluster mainly known as Ogiek language.

== See also ==
- Kinaree
- Kinareh
