= Innocent Obiri =

Kenyan politician

Innocent Obiri MP

Member of Parliament for Bobasi
- Incumbent
- Assumed office 8 August 2017
- Majority: 6,634 (9.8%)

Personal details
- Party: Peoples Democratic Party
- Education: University of Nairobi

Innocent Momanyi Obiri is a Kenyan politician who is currently a member of the National Assembly for the Bobasi constituency, representing the Peoples Democratic Party.

He attended Aga Khan High School in Mombassa and the University of Nairobi before working as a quantity surveyor prior to entering parliament. He was elected to the National Assembly in the 2017 general election with 37.7% of the vote.

In 2018 he was arrested along with one of his bodyguards on suspicion of causing a disturbance at a quarry. In 2019 he was arrested on suspicion of corruption in relation to the construction of the Lake Basin mall in Kisumu.

== Election results ==
General election 2017: Bobasi
Party	Candidate	Votes	%
Peoples Democratic Party	Innocent Momanyi Obiri	25,457	37.69
Jubilee	Stephen Kengere Manoti	18,823	27.87
ODM	Naftal Okongo Mogere	15,948	23.6
Amani	Evans Mogoa Luka	2,692	4
Kenya National Congress	Samuel Mogusu Omari	1,306	1.9
Wiper Democratic Movement - Kenya	Richard Obwogi	1,259	1.9
Kenya Social Congress	David Oogega Bwochora	720	1.1
Party of Independent Candidates of Kenya	Saul Moywaywa	688	1
Maendeleo Chap Chap Party	Samson Maisiba Kirioba	458	0.7
KANU	Henry Nyabuto Ogoti	187	0.3
Majority		6,634	9.8
