= Geoffrey Mbugua Wango =

Kenyan counselling psychologist and academic

Geoffrey Mbugua Wango OGW
- Geoffrey Wango
- Born: 3 September 1966 (age 60); Githiga, Kiambu County, Kenya
- Occupations: Counselling psychologist; Academic; Author
- Awards: Order of the Grand Warrior of Kenya (2022)

Academic background
- Education: Kenyatta University (BEd, M.A.); University of Birmingham (PhD)

Academic work
- Discipline: Psychology
- Sub-discipline: Counselling psychology; Educational psychology
- Institutions: University of Nairobi
- Notable works: Counselling in the School: A Handbook for Teachers (2007); Counselling Psychology in Kenya: A Contemporary Review of the Developing World (2015)
- Website: profiles.uonbi.ac.ke/gmwango

Geoffrey Mbugua Wango (born 3 September 1966) is a Kenyan counselling psychologist, published author and academic who serves as a Senior lecturer in Counseling psychology at the University of Nairobi. He is known for work on school guidance and counselling and for commentary on mental health policy and practice in Kenya.

== Early life and education ==
Wango was born in Githiga, Kiambu County, Kenya, and attended Kenyatta University, where he earned a BEd and an M.A. He completed a Doctor of Philosophy in Counselling at the University of Birmingham in 2006 with a Thesis titled Policy and Practice in Guidance and Counselling in Secondary Schools in Kenya.

== Academic career ==
Before joining the University of Nairobi, Wango worked in Ministry of Education, Science and Technology (Kenya) in Quality assurance, standards, and policy roles, and later at the Kenya Education Management Institute (KEMI). He joined the University of Nairobi as a Lecturer in 2011 and became a Senior lecturer in 2014.

== Research and publications ==
Wango's research and public commentary address school guidance and counselling, peer counselling, and psychosocial support in schools. His doctoral work examined policy and practice in secondary schools in Kenya and has been cited in later discussions on school-based counselling.

== Selected books ==
- "Counselling in the School: A Handbook for Teachers". Riara University Library.
- Wango, Geoffrey Mbugua (2009). School Administration and Management: Quality Assurance and Standards in Schools. Jomo Kenyatta Foundation. ISBN 978-9966227065.
- Wango, Geoffrey Mbugua; Gatere, Anthony (2012). School Finance Management: Fiscal Management to Enhance Governance and Accountability. Jomo Kenyatta Foundation. ISBN 978-9966229298.
- Wango, Geoffrey (2015). Counselling psychology in Kenya: a contemporary review of the developing world. Nairobi: Kenya Literature Bureau. ISBN 9789966103345.

== Policy involvement ==
Wango served on the Task Force on the Re-Alignment of the Education Sector to the Constitution of Kenya, 2010, convened to review the sector under the Vision 2030 framework.

== Media and public commentary ==
Wango has been quoted in Kenyan media on adolescent health and mental well-being, and in reports on strengthening access to mental-health services. Education-sector coverage has also cited his handbooks in discussions of peer counselling and school guidance practice.

== Awards ==
Wango was conferred the Order of the Grand Warrior of Kenya (OGW) on 12 December 2022, reported in Kenyan media and listed in his University profile.
