= Kiamokama =

Small farming community in Kisii County, Kenya

Coordinates: 0.83°S 34.88°E

Kiamokama is a small farming community in Kisii County in the southwest of Kenya.

== People ==
Most of the people in Kiamokama are Abagusii. They speak Ekegusii (native language), Swahili (Kenya's national language) and English. Other tribal languages are sporadically spoken around Kiamokama and this includes Dholuo, Luhya and Egesigisi.

Kiamokama has produced a rich pedigree of citizens spread all over the world. Notable athletes include 'New York' and 'Boston' marathon winner Margaret Okayo, Richard Juma Okayo, international marathon runner Philes Ongori and Former nominated senator Linet Kemunto Nyakeriga.

== Tea factory ==
Kiamokama has established a tea factory to process the product grown in the Gusii Highlands. Due to the fertile nature of the Gusii highlands, many different types of fruits including avocados, guavas, lemons, and ebirangwati grow everywhere a mature seed falls.

== Education ==
The prominent schools in the area include Chironge, Masabo, Kiamokama Township, Mochengo and Mobamba. They are all public schools.

== Governance ==
The area is part of Kiamokama Ward, Within Nyaribari Masaba Constituency. The current Member of County Assembly (MCA) for the area is Kennedy Michira Mainya.
