= Kitutu Chache North Constituency =

Constituency of Kenya

Kitutu Chache North
- constituency for the Parliament of Kenya
- County: Kisii County

Current constituency
- Created: 2013
- Created from: Kitutu Chache

Kitutu Chache North is a constituency in Kenya. It is one of nine constituencies in Kisii County.

== Marani Sub-county ==
Marani Sub-county shares common boundaries with Kitutu Chache North Constituency. The Sub-county is headed by the Deputy County Commissioner under the Ministry of Interior and National Government.
