= Nyaribari Chache Constituency =

Electoral constituency in Kenya

Nyaribari Chache
- constituency for the Parliament of Kenya
- Nyaribari Chache Constituency within Kisii County

- Kisii County within Kenya
- County: Kisii
- Population: 73,167
- Area: 247 km^{2} (95.4 sq mi)

Current constituency
- Created: 1988
- Number of members: 1
- Party: ODM
- Member of Parliament: Zaheer Jhanda
- Created from: Nyaribari
- Wards: 6

Nyaribari Chache is an electoral constituency in Kenya. It is one of nine constituencies in Kisii County. The constituency was established for the 1988 elections from the larger Nyaribari Constituency to form two constituencies of Nyaribari Chache and Masaba.

== Members of Parliament ==
Elections	MP	Party	Notes
1988	Andrew John Omanga	KANU	One-party system
1992	Simeon Nyachae	KANU	
1997	Simeon Nyachae	KANU	
2002	Simeon Nyachae	FORD-People	
2007	Robert Onsare Monda	NARC	
2013	Chris Bichage	ODM	Election nullified
2013	Richard Nyagaka Tongi	FORD-People	December By-election
2017	Richard Nyagaka Tongi	Jubilee Party	
2022	Jhanda Zaheer	UDA	

== Wards ==
Nyaribari Chache Constituency has six wards namely; Kisii Central, Bobaracho, Keumbu, Kiogoro, Birongo and Ibeno. As of 2022, there are 88,553 registered voters.

Ward	Registered Voters
Kisii Central	24,550
Bobaracho	19,235
Ibeno	12,916
Birongo	11,320
Kiogoro	10,510
Keumbu	10,022
Total	88,553
*As of 2022

== Kisii Central Sub-county ==
Kisii Central Sub-county shares common boundaries with Nyaribari Chache Constituency. It is also within the sub-county that Kisii Town is situated. The Sub-county is headed by the Deputy County Commissioner under the Ministry of Interior and National Government.
