= Jhanda Zaheer =

Kenyan politician

The Honourable Jhanda Zaheer

Member of Parliament for Nyaribari Chache Constituency
- Incumbent
- Assumed office 8 September 2022
- Preceded by: Richard Nyagaka Tongi
- Constituency: Nyaribari Chache

Personal details
- Born: Jhanda Zaheer Merhali Kisii, Kenya
- Citizenship: Kenya
- Party: United Democratic Alliance (Kenya)
- Spouse: Aaliyah Zaheer
- Children: 4
- Occupation: Politician
- Profession: Businessman

Jhanda Zaheer Merhali is a Kenyan politician and current member of parliament for Nyaribari Chahe Constituency. He won the seat in the 2022 general elections under the United Democratic Alliance party ticket with 31,694 votes against Jubilee's Richard Tongi, ODM's James Kenani, journalist Eric Obino of Kanu and Chris Bichage on an independent ticket. Before his political career, he was running an entertainment business in Kisii town, operating a company called Phatfarm. He was also running a pool business.

== Early life and education ==
Zaheer was born and raised in Kisii by parents of Arab and Swahili origin. He went to Kisii Primary School from 1986 and completed his Kenya Certificate of Primary Education in 1993. He joined Cardinal Otunga High School in Mosocho the next year and completed his Kenya Certificate of Secondary Education in 1997.

He enrolled for university studies in 2020 to pursue a Bachelor of Arts from Kenya Methodist University.

== Career ==
=== Business ===
Zaheer is a businessman with multiple ventures. He is an associate with Atlanta Corporation Limited, he is also operating various businesses in the entertainment industry with his company, Phtfarm. His family owns multiple hardware outlets within Kisii and Oyugis, later transitioning into a supply chain with Sony Sugar Company, which Zaheer operates and manages.

=== Political ===
He first joined the Kenyan politics in the 2017 general elections, contesting for the Nyaribari Chache member of parliament seat with the Wiper Democratic Movement party ticket. He lost to Jubilee's Richard Tongi, who had 14,140 votes, coming second with 11,170.

During the 2022 general elections, he contested for the seat the second time under the United Democratic Alliance party, this time having a win over Richard Tongi with 31,648 votes to 10,039. Zaheer is a member of the Regional Integration Committee and the Transport and Infrastructure Committee.

== Legal issues ==
=== Election petition ===
After Zaheer lost to Richard Tongi on the Nyaribari Chache Member of Parliament seat in 2017, he and two other contestants filled a petition challenging the results of elections held on August 8. The Supreme Court dismissed the petition uphelding the election results

=== Loan dispute ===
A civil suit was filed by Kenya Commercial Bank in 2019 accusing Zaheer of defaulting in payments of a car loan issued by the lender on November 18, 2014. He was sued for 8.9 million in loan areas.

=== Defamation suit ===
Blogger Cyprian Nyakundi wrote an article on his blog citing Zaheer and two other legislators to a 2023 gold scam operation that was stopped by the Directorate of Criminal Investigation, which led to the legal action to sue Nyakundi for damaging his reputation. The suit was filed on September 12, 2023.

== Personal life ==
Zaheer is married to Aaliyah Zaheer, his first wife and was married to Faith Mutua, also known as Amber Ray, as his second wife. Zaheer and Aaliyah have four children.

== See also ==
- Nyaribari Chache Constituency
- 13th Parliament of Kenya
