= James Nyamweya =

Kenyan politician

Hon James Nyamweya Former Cabinet Minister and Member of Parliament

Personal details
- Born: 28 December 1927 Kisii, Kenya
- Died: 25 September 1995 (aged 67)
- Resting place: Matutu home in Borabu
- Party: Democratic Party of Kenya
- Spouse: Tabitha Moige Nyamweya
- Relations: Peter Nyamweya (brother); Andrew Nyamweya (brother); David Nyamweya (brother); John Nyamweya (brother); Samson Nyamweya (brother); Milka Nyamweya (sister); Ruth Nyamweya (sister)
- Children: Charles Ratemo; Rebecca Masese; Joyce Bochere; George Omari; Kenyalyn Monyenche; Mary Nyaboke; James Ogendi; Christopher Nyambane; Paul Nyamweya
- Parent(s): Louis Manyange (Mother) ( Paul Nyamweya (Father)
- Education: King's College London
- Profession: Lawyer

James Nyamweya (28 December 1927 – 25 September 1995) was a Kenyan politician who served in ministerial, parastatal, and political party leadership positions in both the Kenyatta and Moi governments from 1965 to 1995. He was Parliamentary Secretary in the Ministry of Justice and Constitutional Affairs, Assistant Minister in the Office of the President, Minister of State in charge of External Affairs Foreign Minister, Minister of State in charge of Provincial Administration, Leader of Government Business in Parliament, Minister for Works, Minister for Power and Communication, Minister for Labour, Chairman Electoral Boundaries Commission, and National Vice Chairman of the Democratic Party.

== Early life and education ==
Born in Kisii, Kenya, on 28 December 1927. Nyamweya was the fifth child of Pastor Paul Nyamweya and Louise Manyange. While still young, Nyamweya attended Nyanchwa Seventh Day Adventist Primary School and later moved to Kamagambo Mission School, where he excelled as a student and earned a reputation as an avid reader. Consequently, he qualified to attend Kisii Secondary School. He received a Bachelor of Laws degree from King's College London in 1958.

He served as a Barrister-at-Law at Lincoln's Inn. He served as the MP of the Nyaribari Constituency (now disestablished) from 1963 to 1976, representing the KANU party.

After the multiparty system was revoked in Kenya in 1992, Nyamweya led the newly founded Democratic Party in the Kisii area. His son George Omari Nyamweya later served as the Secretary General of DP.

=== Legal education ===
Nyamweya enrolled in a correspondence course through which he pursued his secondary education, culminating in obtaining the Cambridge School Certificate.

Nyamweya gained admission to Kings College at the University of London for undergraduate studies, where he obtained a Bachelor of Laws degree in 1958. Nyamweya was called to the Bar in Lincoln's Inn in 1959 and became Barrister-at-Law in the same year.

== Career ==
After completing his university education, he returned to Kenya. While studying in the United Kingdom, Nyamweya had the worked with some of the individuals who played a role in the Kenyan independence movement, including Dr Munyua Waiyaki, Sam Waruhiu, John Seroney, Mathews Muli. Upon his return to Kenya, Nyamweya initially joined a colonial government legal secretariat meant to offer legal assistance to all, which substantially helped him expand his political network and allies.

== Odinga trial ==
Despite their position as public employees, Nyamweya and Seroney engaged in political agitation alongside Argwings-Kodhek and Mareka Gecaga, the three were also Kenyan pioneers in the legal profession. After a stint in the colonial civil service, Nyamweya resigned his job and opened a legal practice in Kisumu where he started working with Jaramogi Oginga Odinga. The colonial administration charged Odinga with inciting Africans to rebel against the colonial government.

Nyamweya elaborated on the difficulties and intimidation African freedom fighters were encountering as they articulated the desires of African people to shed the chains of bondage in the trial. In his concluding submission, Nyamweya stated clearly that it is because of this struggle that African leaders were compelled to speak in such terms that the colonial regime misinterpreted as incitement.

In a manner characteristic of colonial magistrates, Nyamweya found himself a target of a contemptuous caution by the magistrate warning Nyamweya to stop turning the court into a platform for agitating African demands against the government. After this landmark case, Nyamweya stepped up his political activities in conjunction with other pre-independence leaders.

== Elections ==
Nyamweya was one of the pioneer KANU leaders who drafted the initial KANU constitution.

Nyamweya eventually ran for elections alongside Lawrence Sagini, Thomas Mongare, Zephaniah Anyieni, among others. During these elections, Sagini contested the elections as a KADU candidate while Nyamweya was in KANU.

== Political style ==
Nyamweya was a son of a pioneer Christian father, Pastor Paul Nyamweya, who was born in a religious home and schooled in mission institutions in Nyanchwa and Kamagambo. To cap it all, Nyamweya married Tabitha Moige, a daughter of Zachariah Nyaribo, a prominent Seventh Day Adventist church elder in Gesusu, Kisii. This background gave him a Christian worldview, which helped define his political style.

In one occasion, when Justus Mokamba challenged Nyamweya's election victory and lost the petition, Nyamweya refused to accept any compensation from him after the court threw out the petition and awarded costs. Instead, Nyamweya invited Mokamba for a discussion where he affirmed his desire not to seek compensation from him, and requested Mokamba to let bygones be bygones. Mokamba was stunned when Nyamweya volunteered to use his considerable influence in government to secure him a prime public service job.

== Projects ==
Throughout his political career, Nyamweya was instrumental in initiating many community projects throughout his Nyaribari constituency such as the building of schools, churches, and cattle dips. He is renowned for being the first to introduce Harambee schools in Kisii, mainly to stop students from the area travelling all the way to Bugema, Uganda to seek secondary education. To make these projects a success, Nyamweya first embarked on activities aimed at uniting all the thirteen clans in Nyaribari so that they may work closely with him. The said thirteen Nyaribari clans were Bonyamoyio; Bonyamasicho; Mwamonda; Mwamoriango; Bonyakoni; Mwaboto; Bomobea; Boguche; Boburia; Botondo; Bokimotwe; Bosigisa and Bonyabondo.

Whenever confronted by cynics Nyamweya's discreet nature set in graciously constraining him from making an irrational, ill-considered reply. It is only after he had thoughtfully considered what to say that he answered back his critics in the most accommodating manner possible. His diplomatic ways earned him a reputation as a peace maker.

Consequently, when Mzee Kenyatta received information that Seventh Day Adventist fanatics in Kisii were uprooting tea plants in the belief that the crop was ungodly, the President turned on to Nyamweya to go and plead with the fanatics to stop engaging in such retrogressive activities. Applying his persuasive approach, it did not take long before the problem fizzled out.

== Mwalimu Hotel ==
The teaching community in Kisii will remember Nyamweya for his significant contribution to the construction of the Mwalimu Teachers Hotel and Office Complex in Kisii. At the time, the local branch of the Kenya National Union of Teachers faced a shortage of office space and wished to build a major hotel in Kisii, but lacked the necessary resources.

Nyamweya was the Minister for Labour when KNUT Kisii branch officials approached him for advice and assistance to obtain resources to implement the project. Nyamweya persuaded the teachers’ union branch to use the salary check-off system to collect the money required and personally ensured that the system was duly approved by the authorities concerned. This single but critical support and advice enabled the Kisii KNUT branch to realize a dream project.

== Ministerial appointments ==
In addition to his everyday political activities, Nyamweya enjoyed a brilliant career as a trusted member of Mzee Jomo Kenyatta's government. Just before the 1963 general elections, constituency boundaries were redrawn and Kisii benefited with increased constituencies one of which was Nyaribari. Nyamweya once again entered the race and emerged a KANU winner a seat he retained for 16 years. After this well earned victory, President Mzee Jomo Kenyatta appointed him Assistant Minister for Constitutional Affairs, a ministry headed by his great friend and confidant, Tom Mboya.

After a while, Mzee Kenyatta appointed Nyamweya as Minister of State in charge of External Affairs. In a rare development in Kenyan political history, Nyamweya as a minister also served as Leader of Government Business in Parliament instead of the then Vice President. Politically, these were stormy days for Kenya as a country newly independent in an international environment characterised by the Cold War rivalry.

Inevitably, Kenya joined the Non Aligned Movement while faced with a Cabinet divided into two distinct groups, those who supported the Western Bloc and friends of the East. In his characteristic moderate stance, Nyamweya preferred the centrist position. Despite his preference, he pursued both centrist and rightist policies mainly because the largest group of the two, which enjoyed Mzee Kenyatta's ear and confidence, were rightists.

== Legislation ==
When Nyamweya later moved to the Ministry of Labour, he used his legal background extensively succeeding in transforming the Ministry into one of the best performing at the time. Indeed, his performance in this ministry has been considered by many as the greatest achievement of Nyamweya among all ministerial portfolios he held in government. When Nyamweya took over the ministry, many labour laws and regulations needed redrafting and harmonising e.g. wages, conditions of work, occupational health, hygiene, and other legal instruments.

These were formative stages when the Ministry of Labour was developing critical employment legal instruments, which required preparation of lay drafts before their submission to the Attorney General's chambers. Nyamweya led discussions aimed at developing an employment tripartite structure and articulated the country's concerns at both local and international fora. Working hand in hand with workers, employers and government, Nyamweya was able to fine-tune the various industrial codes, for submission to the Attorney General's Chambers, which provided a solid foundation for existing Kenyan employment systems still in application today.

== Training levy ==
On the other hand, the critical area of industrial training required legal instruments to govern training at the workplace, conditions of apprenticeship, and the training levy fund. Since in Kenya the training levy fund is industry specific, there were eleven separate funds to cater for, as a result each industry had to come up with its training levy order, which called for a rigorous legal drafting. Nyamweya made informed interventions and legal briefs, which assisted immensely in the development of comprehensive legal instruments. This work was even more challenging because each industry had unique requirements, which demanded submission of a separate draft.

Nyamweya's contributions in comparative analysis and research led to the development of watertight instruments difficult to abuse. The minister applied a participative approach in form of consultations among tripartite partners. Nyamweya ensured each lay draft was clear on the spirit of the proposed Act, which enabled the Attorney General's chambers to finalize draft bills quicker.

== ILO Membership ==
It is while Nyamweya was minister in the Ministry of Labour that Kenya was a member of International Labour Organisation governing body. This is the body, which had the responsibility of steering ILO conventions, and recommendations globally. The responsibility of reporting to the ILO on how the Kenya government was implementing agreed recommendations and conventions was part of his portfolio. Nyamweya adopted a focused and articulated manner of reporting during the organisation's forums, and expression of the position of the Kenya government, and offered well thought out explanations on which conventions Kenya was able to ratify or was in the process of ratifying, and the hurdles the country was experiencing.

Nyamweya's proactive stance to ILO activities put Kenya in a very favourable position. The country enjoyed plenty of benefits from the organisation simply by respecting rules of the game. Consequently, this effort elevated the Kenya image abroad enormously winning the country a nomination to serve as Chairman of ILO governing body, for a period of two years.

== Portfolio ==
At the time Mzee Kenyatta passed on in 1978, Nyamweya was Minister for Labour. In his long and fruitful political career, Nyamweya earned several ministerial and other appointments: Parliamentary Secretary, Ministry of Justice and Constitutional Affairs; Assistant Minister, Office of the President; Minister of State in charge of External Affairs; Minister of State in charge of Provincial Administration; Leader of Government Business in Parliament; Minister for Works; Minister for Power and Communication; Minister for Labour; Chairman Electoral Boundaries Commission; and Democratic Party, National Vice Chairman.

== Relationships with people ==
All those who wereworked with Nyamweya described him as a warm-hearted individual, moral characteristics. Despite his academic and professional standing, he showed rare modesty to blend well with in society. His actions were clear testimony to his expressed firm believe that in any competitive situation there shall be winners and losers and, therefore, once the best man or woman has won an election life must continue.

For instance, despite losing to Lawrence George Sagini in the 1961 pre-independence elections, thereafter his relations with Sagini remained cordial. Daughters of the former two political rivals, Joyce and Margaret, who were in the same school continued to enjoy a ride in any of either father's cars when it was end of term. Sagini's driver often picked up the boys, while Nyamweya's driver took the girls as they travelled to Kisii for school holidays. This close relationship extended to the political standpoints of the two political giants from Kisii. The two often consulted first before seeking the involvement of other Members of Parliament from Kisii with regard to the best position to take whenever major crisis arose in Kenyatta's government.

== Friends ==
Due to his amiable nature, the list of Nyamweya's friends that used to visit his Nairobi and Kisii homes reads like who was who in Kenya those days. Among these were; Mwai Kibaki, Ronald Ngala, George Morara, Mbiyu Koinange, Tom Mboya (was a frequent visitor), Lawrence Sagini, Samuel Ayodo (another very close friend who was once a teacher in Kisii while Nyamweya was in the same profession).

At times, several of his friends Sagini, Mboya, and some of Nyanza MPs would unintentionally meet at Nyamweya's home, and after discussing a subject or two, they would burst into patriotic songs. It was abundantly clear that most Kenyan politicians worked together closely, in unity, and enjoyed their public life a lot immediately after independence.

== Uncertainty ==
However, tension began to build up in the mid-sixties following the formation of the Kenya People's Union party, and following the assassination of Tom Mboya. Joyce Nyamweya clearly recalls one incidence during her April 1969 School holidays while at their rural home in Kisii when Tom Mboya made a surprise visit.

Ordinarily, Tom drove very beautiful cars and dressed smartly whether in a suit or in casual wear. However, that morning he arrived looking different, driving a ramshackle of a car accompanied by his daughter. Another strange aspect about the visit is that Tom entered the house through the back door: there was a sense of urgency and secrecy about it all.

Tom Mboya and Nyamweya sat in the dining room and during their consultations; only Joyce went in to deliver tea. It is then that Joyce overheard Tom Mboya remark, “James, this time it is serious.” Joyce noticed that her Dad paused intentionally waiting for his daughter to finish serving tea before he could respond. Joyce finished her chore and left the room. In July that year, an assassin shot and killed Tom Mboya in a Nairobi street.

This air of political uncertainty continued to affect even the relations between Nyamweya and Sagini towards the end of the sixties. Members of the Nyamweya family also noticed that a sense of distrust was beginning to build up between the then Vice President Daniel arap Moi and Nyamweya. These sore relations arose from a growing speculation at the time that Nyamweya was a pretender to the Vice Presidency, as Kenyatta succession politics heated up in the seventies.

== J. M. Kariuki assassination ==
After assassination of another of Kenya's leading politicians, J. M. Kariuki, Parliament appointed a Select Committee to enquire into the murder. Owing to enormous trust he commanded among parliamentarians and executive, Nyamweya was the only cabinet minister appointed to the Committee. On the day Parliament was voting whether to adopt or simply note the Report of the Select Committee, Nyamweya happened to be out of the country attending the graduation ceremony of his daughter Rebecca at St Lawrence University, Canton, New York.

A major controversy arose after then Attorney General, Charles Njonjo, introduced a peculiar measure requesting Parliament only to note the Report of the Select Committee instead of adopting it. As expected, government rallied its troops in Parliament to support this position. Kenyatta later sacked two members of the executive, Muliro and John Keen, for voting with the opposition.

== Simeon Nyachae ==
One of Nyamweya's best friends was the former minister and Chief Secretary, Simeon Nyachae. The two were close friends and when the latter was Provincial Commissioner in the Rift Valley and based in Nakuru, Nyamweya and family never missed an opportunity to make a stopover for a meal before proceeding on to Nairobi or Kisii. Somehow, by the time Nyachae was moving to Nyeri as PC Central Province, a rift had started to emerge between the two. However, while Nyachae was Chief Secretary, the two managed to hold a couple of meetings culminating in restoration their friendship.

== President Banda ==
Another friend of Nyamweya was the then President of Malawi, Dr. Kamuzu Banda, who spent a night in Nyamweya's Kisii residence when he paid a state visit to Kenya.

Nyamweya elicited such enormous trust from Mzee Kenyatta and his government that there was no reason whatsoever to harbour any suspicions as to what may transpire during such a memorable event. Other presidents who graced Nyamweya's home with visits include Mzee Jomo Kenyatta, Daniel arap Moi, and Mwai Kibaki.

== Titles and honours ==
In his lifetime, Nyamweya received several awards, titles, and honours. Among these were recognitions from Moravian College, Pennsylvania, which awarded him a doctorate degree of laws in 1965, and St. Lawrence University Canton, New York, which awarded him an honorary degree of Doctor of Political Science in 1975. President Mzee Jomo Kenyatta also decorated him with two of the highest honours, Elder of the Golden Heart and Member of the Burning Spear, for his distinguished service to the country.

== Opposition politics ==
After return of the multiparty politics in Kenya, Nyamweya joined hands with President Mwai Kibaki, then Minister for Health in Daniel arap Moi's cabinet, to form Democratic Party (DP). He was later to serve as National Vice-Chairman with Mwai Kibaki as Chairman. Nyamweya demonstrated his extraordinary qualities as a tactful politician when he mobilised the DP campaign so well in Kisii during the 1992 elections, which enabled Mwai Kibaki to get the highest number of votes in Kisii in comparison to other presidential candidates.

Nyamweya's son (George) became Secretary General of the Democratic Party and later formed Party of National Unity (PNU) with President Mwai Kibaki and subsequently became party National Vice-Chairman and nominated Member of Parliament.

== Awards ==
In his lifetime, Nyamweya received several awards, titles, and honours. Among these were recognitions from Moravian College in Pennsylvania, which awarded him a doctorate degree of laws in 1965, and St. Lawrence University in New York, which awarded him an honorary Doctorate of Political Science in 1975. President Mzee Jomo Kenyatta also decorated him with two of the highest honours—Elder of the Golden Heart and Member of the Burning Spear—for his distinguished service to the country.

== Death ==
Throughout his political career, Nyamweya remained a good-natured and sociable person, thorough in all his endeavours, and a deep thinker who spoke only when it was necessary for him to speak. By the time of his death, he had actualised and blended his spiritual, political, and philosophical self. Having been in positions of authority, legal practice, business, politics and all else Nyamweya had concluded that the ideal person is that who loves the Lord, and is at peace with God.

Nyamweya died on 25 September 1995 while serving as National Vice Chairman of the Democratic Party.
