= Maji Mazuri =

Town in Kenya's Baringo County

Coordinates: 0.021740°S 35.699949°E

Maji Mazuri is a small town in Kenya's Baringo County along the Makutano-Ravine-Kampi Ya Moto (C55) highway. This is the most southerly tip of the greater Baringo area. It neighbors Kericho's Londiani and Nakuru's Kamara areas. The settlement was formed by migrants who used to work in the Koibatek Forest, but were either retrenched or retired at one time. As such, Maji Mazuri is home to people from different ethnic groups of Kenya. The Agikuyu and Tugen people are the majority population in the larger Maji Mazuri location of Eldama Ravine division.

== Origin of Maji Mazuri Name ==
The name Maji Mazuri was created by foreign railway workers who came to construct the Nakuru Eldoret railway line. It is said that when they arrived in Maji Mazuri, they were amazed by the clean waters of the natural water dam in Mau catchment. The water was clear, clean, and so cold that they had to leave to boil in the morning before coming back to use it to shower later in the evening.

Maji Mazuri is Swahili for ‘Good Water’.

Maji Mazuri is one of the few notably green areas in Baringo County and has been described as having potential to serve as a breadbasket for the county's drier lowland areas.

Maji Mazuri neighbors Timboroa Town (Which marks the Uasin Gishu, Baringo Border) and Eldama Ravine town (the sub-county headquarters). Igure farm and Makutano township are all found under the Maji Mazuri boundaries.

== Administration ==
Maji Mazuri is currently administered by Chief Mburu who took over the reins of power from retired John Tomno Kiplagat on 12 August 2015 in a ceremony held at Maji Mazuri township. The retired chief had served the area for a period exceeding 20 years. Musa Sirma is one of the most notable national leaders from the greater Maji-Mazuri, Mumberes region.

== Kinare Village of Baringo County ==
Kinare Village is found within the Maji Mazuri area under the newly formed Igure sub-location of Baringo County. The village neighbors Andama to the North-East and remnants of Koibatek Forest to the South-West and South-East. It is served by the Makutano to Ravine Junction highway with the key public institutions found there being St. Mary's Andama and Kinare Pre-School.

== Origin of the Name Kinare ==
A long time ago, in Kenyan forests (and even today), there lived a tribe called the Ndorobos or Ogiek. They were very close to the Kikuyu though they were more of a nilotic descent. Now among the Ndorobos there existed a sub-tribe known as "Akiek pa Kinare". They generally spoke a Kalenjin dialect. It is therefore likely that (1) they were the original inhabitants of the area or (2) the place was named after Kinare (Limuru) because of its close resemblance.

== Koibatek Forest ==
Maji Mazuri's Koibatek forest extends further beyond the settlement's location. In fact, the forest marks the most outward border of the Baringo County, Kericho and Nakuru County border points. Towards Nakuru, the forest starts near Kibunja area stretching northwards. Towards the Kericho area, the forest starts right Kimberessu saw mill just near Makutano Trading center.

Mr. Daniel Keru Mungai was among the most notable forest officers who championed the foundation of this great forest. Another notable contributor was Mr. Makosero who led a great initiative to rehabilitate parts of the Koibatek Forest. Part of the stretch of the Forest is known as "Makosero" christened from the person who lead the fight for its rehabilitation.

Koibatek forest is a mega-catchment area for Molo River which flows down and empties its water at the world renowned Lake Baringo via the Perkerra River irrigation corridor.
