= Ratemo Michieka =

Kenya National Academy of Sciences http://www.knasciences.or.ke › 377-fknas-043-1994 He is currently the Honorary Secretary of KNAS. .. 1st Vice Chancellor of Jomo Kenyatta University of Agriculture and Technology
- In office 1989–2003
- Succeeded by: Nick Wanjohi

Personal details
- Born: Kisii, Kisii District, Nyanza province, Kenya

Ratemo Michieka is a former director-general of the National Environmental Management Authority (NEMA) in Kenya; he is also the founding Vice-Chancellor of Jomo Kenyatta University of Agriculture and Technology.

For a long time, Michieka worked in education and agricultural policy in Eastern Africa. He earned a doctorate in weed science from Rutgers University. He returned to his native Kenya, where he taught and later became chairman of the Department of Crop Science at the University of Naairobi. In 1994, he was named vice chancellor of Jomo Kenyatta University of Agriculture and Technology in Juja, Kenya, a post equivalent to a U.S. university president. He held the post until he was appointed Director General of the National Environmental Management Authority.

== Politics ==
In 2008, Ratemo Michieka ran for the parliamentary seat of Nyaribari Masaba. He came in third behind Prof. Sam Ongeri and Dr. Hezron Manduku.
