= Nyaribari Masaba Constituency =

Electoral district of Kenya

Nyaribari Masaba
- constituency for the Parliament of Kenya
- County: Kisii County

Current constituency
- Created: 1988
- Created from: Nyaribari

Nyaribari Masaba is an electoral constituency in Kenya. It is one of nine constituencies in Kisii County. The constituency was established for the 1988 elections.

== Members of Parliament ==
Elections	MP	Party	Notes
1988	Sam Ongeri	KANU	One-party system.
1992	Hezron Manduku	KANU	
1997	Sam Ongeri	KANU	
2002	Hezron Manduku	Ford-People	
2007	Sam Ongeri	KANU	
2013	Elijah Moindi	NARC	
2017	Ombaki Ezekiel Machogu	NAPK	
2022	Daniel Ogwoka Manduku	ODM	

== Wards ==
Ward	Registered Voters	Local Authority
Amabuko	4,424	Keroka town
Ichuni	6,839	Keroka town
Gekonge	2,061	Masimba town
Gesusu	7,532	Masimba town
Kerema	4,881	Masimba town
Metembe	2,568	Masimba town
Ikorongo	6,757	Gusii county
Kiamokama	6,787	Gusii county
Mogonga	5,308	Gusii county
Total	46,157	
*September 2005.

== Masaba South Sub-county ==
Masaba South Sub-county shares common boundaries with Nyaribari Masaba Sub-county. It is in the sub-county where the Kisii County part of Keroka is located. The Sub-county is headed by the Deputy County Commissioner under the Ministry of Interior and National Government.
