= Bomachoge Chache Constituency =

Constituency in Kisii County, Kenya

Bomachoge Chache
- constituency for the Parliament of Kenya
- County: Kisii County

Current constituency
- Created: 2013
- Created from: Bomachoge

Bomachoge Chache is a constituency in Kenya.

It is one of nine constituencies in Kisii County.

== Gucha Sub-county ==
Gucha Sub-county shares common boundaries with Bomachoge Chache Constituency. The sub-county is headed by the Deputy County Commissioner under the Ministry of Interior and National Government.
