= John Muiruri =

Kenyan footballer (born 1979)

Personal information
- Full name: John Machethe Muiruri
- Date of birth: 10 October 1979 (age 47)
- Place of birth: Kenya
- Position: Midfielder

Team information
- Current team: Moss FK
- Number: 4

Senior career*
Years	Team	Apps	(Gls)
1998–1999	Utalii		
1999–2000	Tusker		
2001–2004	Gent	48	(4)
2004–2005	Germinal Beerschot	30	(0)
2005–2010	Moss	111	(21)

International career^{‡}
1998–2007	Kenya	23	(1)
- * Club domestic league appearances and goals as of 22:57, 27 November 2009 (AEST) ‡ National team caps and goals as of 27 November 2009

John Machethe "Mo" Muiruri (born 10 October 1979) is a Kenyan footballer who last played for Moss FK in Norway as a midfielder. He was known for his close ball control and ability to dribble the ball.

He led Kisii School to two national championships before graduating in 1997.

Muiruri has played 20 international matches for Kenya as well as 13 matches at U-21 and U-23 level. He appeared at the 2004 African Cup of Nations.
