= George Nyamweya =

Kenyan politician

Hon. George Omari Nyamweya, MBS

Member of the National Assembly
- In office 2008–2013

Personal details
- Born: 25 August 1955 (age 71)
- Party: Party of National Unity
- Spouse: Betty Kareha Omari Nyamweya (m. 1987)
- Children: Angela Nyamweya, Paul Nyamweya, Tabitha M. Nyamweya II, James Nyamweya
- Education: King's College London
- Occupation: Lawyer
- Awards: Moran of the Order of the Burning Spear (M.B.S.)

George Omari Nyamweya (born 25 August 1955) is a Kenyan politician who served as a Member of the National Assembly from 2008 to 2013.

The son of the late former Kenyan Foreign Minister and Kisii politician James Nyamweya. Nyamweya was educated at Kisii School, Nairobi School and King's College London where he obtained an LLB in 1978.
