= Bomachoge Borabu Constituency =

Kenyan constituency

Bomachoge Borabu
- constituency for the Parliament of Kenya
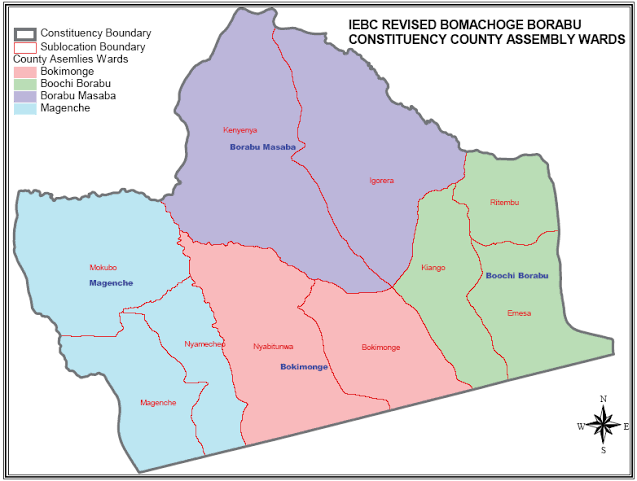
- County: Kisii County

Current constituency
- Created: 2013
- Party: ODM
- Member of Parliament: Obadiah Barongo
- Created from: Bomachoge

Bomachoge Borabu is a constituency in Kenya. It is one of nine constituencies in Kisii County. The constituency was hived off from the former Bomachoge constituency and it was established for the 2013 general elections.

== Members of Parliament ==
Election	Member of Parliament	Party	Notes
2013	Joel Onyancha	TNA	
2017	Zadoc Ogutu	Independent	
2022	Obadiah Barongo	ODM	

== Kenyenya Sub-county ==
The constituency has one sub-county (Kenyenya sub-county) which is the main administrative area in the constituency. The sub-county is headed by the Deputy County Commissioner under the Ministry of Interior and National Government.

== Wards ==
The Constituency is divided into four (4) electoral wards namely;

1. Magenche.

2. Bombaba Borabu

3. Bokimonge.

4. Boochi Borabu.
