= Philes Ongori =

Kenyan long-distance runner (born 1986)

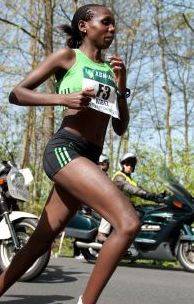
- Image of Philes Ongori during Rotterdam Marathon 2011

Medal record

Women's athletics

Representing Kenya

World Half Marathon Championships
| Silver medal – second place | 2009 Birmingham | Half marathon |

Philes Moora Ongori (born 19 July 1986 in Chironge, Kiamokama, in Kisii District) is a Kenyan long-distance runner who competes in half marathon and marathon events.

Her early career was based in Japan and she won a number of All-Japan Corporate titles for the Hokuren team. She ran the 10,000 metres for Kenya at the 2007 World Championships in Athletics, but came to prominence in the half marathon in 2008 when she won the Kagawa Marugame Half Marathon in the fastest time of the year. At the 2009 IAAF World Half Marathon Championships she won the silver medal. Ongori won on her marathon debut at the Rotterdam Marathon in 2011, setting a time of 2:24:20 hours.

== Career ==
Philes Ongori grew up in the same village as another great female long distance runner Margaret Okayo, who is a twice winner of the New York City Marathon. Ongori moved to Japan as a teenager and ran for Yamanashi Gakuin High School. She joined the Hokuren Women's Running Club in 2005 and won five All-Japan corporate titles on the track for the team, over distances from 1500 metres to 10,000 metres. She formed part of Kenya's team for the Chiba Ekiden in November 2005 and she ran the fastest opening leg and Kenya went on to win the race. She made her half marathon debut in March 2006 and won on her first attempt, taking the Matsue Ladies Half Marathon title. Ongori claimed third place at the Sapporo Half Marathon later that year. She set a personal best of 31:18.85 minutes for the 10,000 m in September in Oita.

She had her first sub 1:10 clocking in the half marathon at the All-Japan Corporate Half Marathon in 2007, which she won in a time of 1:09:50 hours. She was selected for the 10,000 metres race at the 2007 World Championships and she finished eighth. The following year she won the Kagawa Marugame Half Marathon; her time of 1:07:57 was the second fastest win recorded on the circuit. This time was the fastest run for the distance by any athlete that year. She was expected to perform well at the All-Japan Corporate Half Marathon, but it was Yukiko Akaba who took the title while Ongori ended the race in third. She came within a second of her best in the 10,000 m at the Hyogo Relays in Kobe, edging out Yoko Shibui.

Her opening race of the 2009 season came at the Ras Al Khaimah Half Marathon and she improved her best time to 1:07:50 to take third place. In May she won at the Sotokoto Safari Half Marathon in Kenya, defeating Helena Kiprop in the process. At the Kenyan Track and Field Championships she was third over 10,000 m, behind Linet Masai and Lineth Chepkurui. Her performances gained her selection for the 2009 IAAF World Half Marathon Championships and although Mary Keitany went on to take a clear victory, Ongori beat Aberu Kebede in a sprint finish for the silver medal. This helped Kenya to the women's team title at the event.

The Abu Dhabi Half Marathon was her major race in 2010 and she was the runner-up behind teammate Keitany. In March the following year Ongori she ran at the Paris Half Marathon, but was again second-best behind a fellow Kenyan, this time Peninah Arusei. Ongori made her marathon debut in April 2011 at the Rotterdam Marathon and she outran the more experienced Hilda Kibet in the final stages to win the race in a quick first-time run of 2:24:20 hours. She was the first Kenyan finisher at the World 10K Bangalore, taking fifth place behind Ethiopian women. She won the Berlin Half Marathon in April 2012, beating Helah Kiprop by one second at the line, then won the Yangzhou Jianzhen International Half Marathon at the end of the month. She was second at the Sotokoto Safari Half Marathon in June, but missed the rest of the season.

She opened 2013 with runner-up finishes at Berlin Half Marathon and the Prague Marathon. She was fifth at the Yokohama Women's Marathon.

Her elder brother Peter Isaboke Mogere was also a runner. On 19 March 2010 he collapsed and died after finishing a 5000 metres heat at Ruring'u Stadium, Nyeri.

She has been based in Ontario, Canada since 2023.

== Achievements ==
- 8th 2007 World Championships, 10,000m
- (bronze) 2009 Ras Al Khaimah Half Marathon
- (silver) 2009 World Half Marathon Championships (1st in team race)
- (gold) 2011 Rotterdam Marathon
- (gold) 2024, 2026 Toronto Marathon

== Personal bests ==
- 800 metres – 2:05.56 min (2004)
- 1500 metres – 4:11.86 min (2004)
- 3000 metres – 8:47.88 min (2007)
- 5000 metres – 14:50.15 min (2007)
- 10,000 metres – 31:18.85 min (2006)
- Half marathon – 1:07:38 hrs (2009)
- Marathon – 2:24:20 (2011)
