= Doris Petra =

Doris Petra is the current deputy president of Football Kenya Federation, and a board member at regional body CECAFA.

Petra is a long serving Kenya federation official having served under different regimes before making history of being voted in as the first female deputy president on 10 Feb 2016 by virtue of being a running mate to president Nick Mwendwa.

She retained her position in the next election held on 17 October 2020. From Nov 2021 to Sept 2022, Doris held forte as Football Kenya Federation boss following the stepping down of Mwendwa after he was arraigned and charged in court for alleged misappropriation of funds, thereby being the first ever female boss in Kenyan football.
