= Antoney Kibagendi =

Kenyan politician

MP for Kitutu Chache South Constituency
- Incumbent
- Assumed office 16 August 2022
- Preceded by: Richard Onyonka

Personal details
- Party: Orange Democratic Movement

Antoney Kibagendi is a Kenyan politician. He is a member of the Orange Democratic Movement.

== Early life ==
Kibagendi was raised by a single mother.

== Political career ==
In the 2022 general election, he was elected to the National Assembly succeeding Richard Onyonka.

== See also ==
- 13th Parliament of Kenya
