= Majoge-Bassi Constituency =

Former Kenyan electoral constituency

Majoge-Bassi
- Former constituency for the Parliament of Kenya
- District: Kisii District

Former constituency
- Created: 1963
- Abolished: 1988
- Number of members: One
- Replaced by: Bobasi & Bomachoge

Majoge-Bassi was an electoral constituency in Kisii District of Nyanza Province. Created for the 1963 general elections, it is one of the six original constituencies of Kisii District and among the 117 constituencies of independent Kenya. The constituency was abolished in the 1988 Kenyan general election, and split into Bobasi & Bomachoge constituencies.
