= Sam Nyamweya =

Kenyan businessperson (born 1953)

Sam Keengu Nyamweya (born 1 Jan 1953) is a long serving football official and one time President of the Football Kenya Federation following his election on 11 October 2011. Nyamweya took over from Mohammed Hatimy, and was succeeded by Nick Mwendwa in February 2016.

Nyamweya served in various positions at the federation previously as well as in the region, but his tenure was scandal-filled.

Nyamweya is hopeful of becoming the Kenyan FA boss by contesting the next football elections.
