= 2024 FKF Electoral Board =

Football Kenya Federation (FKF) Electoral Board is a five-member team tasked with overseeing football elections by December 2024.

The board takes over from the 2020 FKF Electoral Board that had a similar mandate prior to the last elections.

The board is chaired by Hesbon Owilla, while Merceline Sande serves as Secretary. The President of Sports Journalists Association of Kenya (SJAK) James Waindi, former AFC Leopards chair Dan Mule and Alfred Ng’ang’a are members. The board was officially inaugurated on 23 Sep 2024.

The board members were nominated, and ratified to conduct the process during the FKF Special General Meeting (SGM) held on 24 August 2024.

== See also ==
- 2020 FKF Electoral Board
- Football elections in Kenya
