= Joab Omino =

Joab Henry Omino Onyango was a former politician, diplomat, Kenyan international footballer, chair and patron of Gor Mahia, and chairman of the Kenya Football Federation between 1985 and 1996.

He also served as the deputy speaker of the National assembly in Kenya's eight parliament between 1998 and 2002.

He died on 13 January 2004, aged 64, at a point when he was the chair of The Liberal Democratic Party (LDP), as an Assistant Minister for Foreign Affairs, and Kisumu Town West Member of Parliament.
