= Kentice Tikolo =

Kenyan communications professional

Kentice Libutsuli Tikolo is a Kenyan communication professional, strategic public relations expert, teacher, scientist, mentor and sports enthusiast.^{[1]} She is the Founder and Managing Director of Cause Impact Limited, a Nairobi-based strategic communication consultancy, and the Kusudi Cause Communication Trust, a non-profit that seeks to leverage strategic communication in advocating for causes. Throughout her career, she has been recognised for her leadership in public relations, her contributions to social-impact initiatives in Kenya and her pioneering role in sports governance.

== Early life and education ==
Kentice's early schooling included attendance at Loreto High School, Limuru and Alliance Girls High School between approximately 1977 and 1983.

She later earned a Bachelor of Education degree in Botany and Zoology from Kenyatta University. She holds a Master of Science in Public Relations from the University of Stirling in Scotland. She is pursuing a PhD in Climate Change and Adaptation, focusing on policy and communication, at the University of Nairobi.

== Career ==
=== Research and administration ===
Before moving fully into strategic communication management, Kentice worked in research-administrative roles in multicultural and international settings. She accumulated approximately ten years of experience in research, administrative and management roles, including at the International Livestock Research Institute (ILRI) and its predecessor, the International Laboratory for Research on Animal Diseases (ILRAD). During this period, she co-authored a paper on tumour necrosis factor secretion in cattle infected with trypanosomes, published in Immunology.^{[10]}

=== Transition to public relations ===
Kentice deliberately transitioned into communication and public relations. In an interview, she stated that the move was prompted by a senior adviser who recognised her aptitude for PR, which she had demonstrated in an earlier role as the first Dean of Students at the Aga Khan Academy.^{[1]} She subsequently rose to senior roles in the communication field. She served as the Manager of Corporate Communication at the Kenya Civil Aviation Authority, where she initiated a detailed communication audit with IPSOS Kenya, which helped stabilise a troubled aviation regulator. She then moved on to the Kenya Wildlife Service (KWS) as the Head of Corporate Communication, where she developed the first communication strategy for 2008–2012. Among her key reforms was the production of an innovative 2007 Annual Report, which won the top prize at the Public Relations Society of Kenya (PRSK) annual awards.

=== Cause Impact Limited ===
During her consultancy phase, Kentice founded Cause Impact Limited (formerly Impact Africa), a research-driven strategic public relations and communication management firm based in Nairobi. As Managing Director, she oversees the firm's vision, talent development and client strategy, emphasising the integration of scientific rigour with creative communication.^{[1]} The firm has worked across numerous sectors, including public health, transport safety, the environment and development communication, with clients such as the National Transport Safety Authority, the International Institute of Tropical Agriculture (IITA), the AIDs Healthcare Foundation, the End Malaria Council Kenya and the integrated coastal zone management (ICZM) programmes.

=== Academic and mentoring roles ===
Kentice has served as a lecturer in strategic public relations and communication management at the University of Nairobi. She is active as a mentor and coach in the communication field, particularly guiding younger professionals and women entering the industry.^{[2]}

She is also the founder of the Kusudi Cause Communication Trust, a non-profit that works on causes including air pollution, sexuality education & mentorship for adolescents and an "Adopt a School" initiative.^{[3]}

== Sports and governance ==
Kentice has a long-standing involvement in sport, as a competitor, administrator and governance figure. During her school and university years, she participated in hockey, basketball, volleyball, lawn tennis and athletics, representing her school at the national level. She comes from a family with a notable sporting heritage; her father trained as a sports teacher and played in the Gossage Cup (now CECAFA) alongside the late football figure Joe Kadenge.

In 2020, Kentice was appointed Chair of the Football Kenya Federation (FKF) Electoral Board, becoming the first woman in Kenya to chair a board overseeing men's football elections.^{[4]} In this role, she prioritised transparent and credible elections at the county and national levels within the federation. A commentary in December 2020 described her as challenging the status quo and advocating for women's visibility in sports administration.^{[2]}

== Social-impact communication ==
Kentice has been recognised for her role in social-impact communication campaigns in Kenya. Amongst the campaigns attributed to her initiative is the Beyond Zero half-marathon campaign of the First Lady of Kenya, an initiative to reduce maternal and child mortality that utilised mobile clinics distributed to counties.

She has been involved in training and facilitating communication programmes for organisations including the International Development Research Centre (IDRC), the International Cancer Institute (ICI), UNICEF, UNDP and the Westminster Foundation for Democracy (WFD). Her approach draws on research-informed communication strategies, stakeholder mapping and evaluation methodologies such as Net-Map analysis and the Balanced Scorecard.

== Awards and honours ==
• She has been conferred the Kenyan government honour of Order of the Grand Warrior (OGW) In recognition of her service to the nation.

• She holds the status of Fellow of the Public Relations Society of Kenya (FPRSK), awarded in recognition of her high contribution to the profession.^{[6]}

• She won the Golden Honours Award (PRSK) for excellence in advancing public relations in 2008.

• She received a silver medal from the Government of Ethiopia for her role in coordinating the 2011 Addis edition of the International Conference on AIDS and STIs in Africa (ICASA).

== Board memberships ==
Kentice has held influential positions on several boards across public relations, communications, governance and social development:

• Member of the Africa Education and Environment Foundation (AEFF) ^{[5]} Board

• Board Chair of JustAct, formerly Public Interest Litigation Advocacy on Environment (PILAE).

• Member of the Africa Digna Kenya Board, which administers scholarships for pupils in need, including those from her alma mater, Loreto High School, Limuru.

• Chairperson of the Loreto Limuru Alumnae Association

• Fellow and past Chair of the Public Relations Society of Kenya (PRSK), where she led professionalisation and capacity-building efforts for the PR industry in Kenya.^{[6]}

• Former board member of the Global Alliance for Public Relations and Communication Management, representing Africa and advancing global PR standards and networks.^{[7]}

• Former Director at the Communications Authority of Kenya (CA), contributing to regulatory oversight and communication governance from 2016 to 2022.^{[8]}

== Selected publications and thought leadership ==
• Co-author of Proactive PR, a public relations management textbook, Moran Publishers.^{[9]}

• Contributor of a chapter to Pitch, Tweet or Engage on the Street: How to Practise Global Public Relations and Strategic Communication (2016), edited by Kara Alaimo.

• Editor of Porini: Wildlife News, the Kenya Wildlife Service newsletter.

• Founder and editor of The East African Aviator magazine for the Kenya Civil Aviation Authority.

• Co-ordinator of the production of various annual reports and the KWS in-house online newsletter, E-News.

• Commissioned, co-ordinated and managed Bill Bryson's tour of Kenya, which he used to write The African Diary (2002), a resource-mobilisation product for CARE International.^{[10]}

• Participated in the production of two manuals for CARE International: Gender Mainstreaming for Project Managers (2003) and Participatory Capacity Assessment: A Tool for Organisational Development.

• Sileghem, M., Tikolo, K., Ellis, J., "Secretion of tumour necrosis factor by monocytes from cattle infected with T. vivax and T. congolense", Immunology, (IL-1183).

• Founded the Utafiti Newsletter, The Lens and the ILRAD Staff Newsletter.

== Legacy and impact ==
Tikolo's career encompasses roles in science, communications, governance, and sports. After beginning her career as a research technician, she transitioned into strategic communications. In this field, she founded a specialist consultancy and participated in social-impact campaigns, teaching, mentoring and sports governance in Kenya.

== See also ==
- Football in Kenya
