= Ezekiel Machogu Ombaki =

Kenyan politician

Ezekiel Machogu Ombaki (born 1 January 1956) is a Kenyan politician who served as the Cabinet Secretary for the Ministry of Education after being nominated by President William Ruto.

== Early life and education ==
Ombaki attended Nduru High School and later completed his O-levels at Agoro Sare Secondary School in 1975. From 1976 to 1979 he attended the University of Nairobi where he earned a Bachelor of Arts in Business Administration.

== Career ==
Ombaki started his career in the office of the president as a District Officer, where he worked from 1976 to 1979. He later became a District Commissioner, an office he left in 2008. He served as a Senior Deputy Secretary in the public service commission until 2016. In 2017 he entered the National Assembly as a Member of Parliament from Nyaribari Masaba Constituency. Ombaki was a member of the Committee on Regional Integration and the Members Services and Facilities Committee while in Parliament.
