= Grace Nduta =

Kenyan politician

Grace Nduta Wairimu

Member of the County Assembly for Kanyenya-ini Ward
- Incumbent
- Assumed office 20 September 2022
- Constituency: Kanyenya-ini Ward

Personal details
- Occupation: Politician
- Known for: Politics

Grace Nduta also known as Grace Nduta Wairimu is a Kenyan politician who represents the Kanyenya-ini Ward in Murang’a County in the Kenyan Parliament.

== Political career ==
Wairimu took oath of office as the Member of County Assembly (MCA) for Kanyenya-ini Ward in Murang’a County on 20 September 2022.

== Case and arrest ==
Wairimu was suspected to have been involved in the alleged abduction of Juja Member of Parliament (MP) George Koimburi that is thought to have occurred on 25 May 2025. On 29 May 2025, Grace Nduta Wairimu was arrested by the Directorate of Criminal Investigations to help in the investigation process about the abduction of Hon. George Koimburi. For investigations, four suspects (Grace Nduta Wairimu , Peter Kiratu Mbari, David Macharia Gatana and Cyrus Muhia) were arrested in the abduction of Juja MP George Koimburi before being granted bail at Ksh 300,000 or an alternative bond of Ksh 1 million. As part of their release conditions, the court prohibited the suspects from having any contact with witnesses, and Magistrate Carolyne Mugo ordered them to report to the investigating officer weekly and whenever summoned by the Directorate of Criminal Investigations (DCI). The suspects appeared in court on 16 July 2025.

== See also ==
- Murang'a County
- Politics of Kenya
- Kenyan Parliament
- George Koimburi
