= FKF Caretaker Committee =

2011-2012 football affairs entity

Football Kenya Federation (FKF) caretaker committee was an entity put in place on 11 November 2011 vide a Kenya gazette notice by the then Sports Cabinet Secretary (CS) Ambassador Amina Mohamed. It was mandated to run football affairs in Kenya for a period of six months following disbandment of the Federation.

== History ==
CS Amina's decision to kick out the Federation led by Nick Mwendwa was informed after her office received an audit report from the Sports Registrar that cited alleged massive corruption and embezzlement of funds.

The Caretaker Committee was 15-member strong, chaired by retired Justice Aaron Ringera, and were assisted by a secretariat led by TV news personality Lindah Ogutu.

The FKF Caretaker committee's first tenure expired on 10 May 2022 then re-emerged under the name FKF Transition Committee on 13 May 2022 for a period of five weeks with a 12-member team, and six-person secretariat.

After the five weeks, FKF Transition committee's mandate was extended by another two months till mid August 2022 under new chair General (Rtd) Moses Oyugi who stepped up to take the role of his departing chair Ringera. The committee's mandate was further stretched by another two months till mid October of the year 2022.

== Original members ==
The original FKF caretaker committee members included; Aaron Ringera (Chair), General (Rtd) Moses Oyugi, Fatma Adan, Philip Musyimi Mue, Anthony Isayi, Elisha Chepchieng Kiplagat, Hassan Mahmoud Haji, Fredrick Tureisa Lekesike, Mwangi Muthee, Neddy Atieno, Joe Masiga, Bobby Ogolla, Richard Omwela, Titus Kasuve, and Ali Amour.

Secretariat: Linda Ogutu, (Head), Michael Muchemi (Secretary), Lorine Nerea Shitubi (Joint Secretary), Caesar Handa, Herbert Mwachiro, Edward Rombo, Hiba Hussein, Gabriel Warigi, Dr. Walter Ongeti, Rashid Khamisi Ali Shedu, Rachael Kamweru, Robin Toskin.

== Criticism ==
The disbandment of the Federation received all manner of reactions, with some quarters calling it out from the onset. Further concerns were to soon follow as the FKF Caretaker seemed not to have a clear pathway of achieving its mandate of ensuring FKF aligned with the Sports Act, 2013, ensuring smooth running of FKF operations including team preparations for all local and international sporting events; coordinating elections of FKF, and handing over the management to the new elected team.

== Recommendations ==
Upon expiry of their mandate in May 2022, the FKF Caretaker committee handed a raft of recommendations, as well as the FKF Transition committee at the tail end of their tenure. No recommendation saw the light of day as soon after, the disbanded FKF returned to office following the arrival of a new Sports CS Ababu Namwamba who took over from Amb. Amina Mohammed.

== FIFA Ban ==
The arrival of the FKF Caretaker committee in November 2021, in lieu of duly elected FKF Executive committee, attracted the attention of World Governing body FIFA who, after a series of warnings early on, ultimately banned Kenya in February 2022 due to 'third party interference'. The ban was only lifted after nine months, in November 2022, a few months after FKF had resumed office.
