= Nyaribari Constituency =

Former Kenyan electoral constituency

Nyaribari
- Former constituency for the Parliament of Kenya
- District: Kisii District
- Region: Nyanza

Former constituency
- Created: 1963
- Abolished: 1988
- Number of members: One
- Replaced by: Nyaribari Chache & Nyaribari Masaba

Nyaribari was an electoral constituency in Kisii District of Nyanza Province. Created by the colonial government for the 1963 general elections, it is one of the six original constituencies of Kisii District and among the 117 constituencies of independent Kenya. The constituency was abolished before the 1988 Kenyan general election, and split into Nyaribari Chache and Nyaribari Masaba.

== Members of Parliament ==
Elections	Member of Parliament	Party	Notes
1963	James Nyamweya	KANU	Inaugural elections in independent Kenya
1969	James Nyamweya	KANU	
1974	James Nyamweya	KANU	
1979	James Nyamweya	KANU	
1983	Andrew Omanga		Constituency abolished in 1988
