= Kitutu Chache South Constituency =

Kitutu Chache South
- constituency
- Country: Kenya
- County: Kisii County

Kitutu Chache South is a constituency in Kenya. It is one of nine constituencies in Kisii County.

== Kitutu Central Sub-county ==
Kitutu Central Sub-county shares common boundaries with Kitutu Chache South Constituency. The Sub-county is headed by the sub-county administrator, appointed by a County Public Service Board.

== Members ==
- Richard Onyonka
- Antoney Kibagendi
