= James Ongwae =

Kenyan politician

His Excellency H.E James Elvis Omariba Ongwae, EGH CBS, OGW, EBS

1st Governor of Kisii County
- In office 27 March 2013 – 25 August 2022

Personal details
- Born: James Omariba Ongwae; 1952 (age 73–74) Kisii, South Nyanza District, Kenya Colony
- Party: United Super Alliance Party - USAP
- Spouse: Elizabeth Ongwae
- Children: 4
- Education: University of Nairobi
- Occupation: Politician & Governor of Kisii County
- Profession: Public Policy Administrator

James Elvis Omariba Ongwae (born 1952) is the former (first) elected Governor of Kisii County Government March 2013 - August 2022. He is currently the Party Leader of the United Super Alliance Party (USAP) whose slogan is TUKO MACHO.

== Early life and education ==
In summary: Ongwae was born in Mwamonari Location, Marani District, Kitutu Chache North Constituency, Kisii County in the year 1952. He started his formal education in Itierio Primary School where he took his primary school education before proceeding to Kisii High School for his O-Level and A- levels. Ongwae then joined the University of Nairobi where he pursued a Bachelors of Arts|(Hons) degree in Economics and Government. He thereafter joined Institute of Social Studies (ISS)-The Hague, the Netherlands for postgraduate studies and pursued his master's degree in Public Policy and Administration. He would later proceed to East & Southern Africa Management Institute (ESAMI)- TRAPCA Program, Tanzania to do a postgraduate diploma in management and government.

== Professional career ==
He started his work in the public service as a District Officer. He then became an Immigration Officer, then Government Management Analyst and lastly served as Director of Civil Service Reform Programme. He later served as a Permanent Secretary in the Office of the President and a director of Personnel Management (DPM). He was also the Secretary/CEO for the Teachers Service Commission and Permanent Secretary in the Ministry of Agriculture in the government of Kenya. As he served in the public service, he spearheaded various government initiatives served and managed various government committees and policy projects. Among them were the councils of University of Nairobi, Maseno University, Egerton University and Jomo Kenyatta University of Agriculture and Technology. He served in the commissions of Higher Education, Adult Education and Kenya National Examination Council (KNEC). He also worked at the Directorate of Industrial Training and served as an associate member of the Kenya Institute of Management (K.I.M). He retired from his professional work in December 2005 to pave way for his political ambitions.

== Political career ==
Ongwae participated in competitive politics for the first time when he vied for the Member of Parliament seat of Kitutu Chache Constituency, Kisii County in the general elections of December 2007. He was unsuccessful but was seen in the political arena in 2010 when he campaigned for the passing of the new Kenyan Constitution 2010. He vied for the position of Governor of Kisii County on 4 March 2013, general election under the Orange Democratic Movement ticket which he won, therefore, becoming the first governor of Kisii County. He was sworn to office on 27 March 2013. In August 2017, he vied for the seat for the second term where he faced five opponents among them: Chris Obure of Jubilee Party of Kenya, Boniface Omboto of Maendeleo Chap Chap (MCC), Manson Nyamweya of Kenya National Congress (KNC), Patrick Lumumba of Wiper Democratic Movement and Omingo Magara of People's Democratic Party (PDP). He won and was sworn in for the second term.

== Governor of Kisii County ==
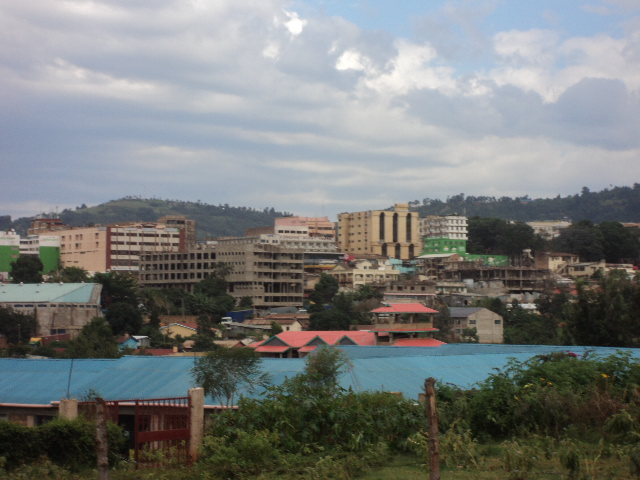
Kisii Town, Kenya

As governor of Kisii County, with approval from the County Assembly of Kisii County, he appointed the following:

- Mr. Patrick Lumumba who serves as the County Secretary.
- Onchari Kenani is the Economic Advisor.
- Ms. Mogaka Biliah serves as the Chief Officer and Chief of Staff at the Office of the Governor.

He also appointed the following individuals into the County Executive Committee (Effective August 2017 -Second Term):

- Dr Walter Bichang'a Okibo serves as the Count Executive Committee member in-charge of Administration, Corporate Services and Stakeholder Management.
- Mr. Esman Nyandikah Onsarigo is the Count Executive Committee member in charge of Agriculture, Livestock, Fisheries and Cooperative Development.
- Mrs. Sarah Angima Omache works as the Count Executive Committee member coordinating the provision of Health Services.
- Mr. Duke Mainga Ondiba is the Count Executive Committee member in-charge of Culture, Sports, Youth and Social Services.
- Mr. Vincent Sagwe serves as the Count Executive Committee member in-charge of Roads, Public Works and Transport.
- Mrs. Edinah Nyaboke Kangwana is the Count Executive Committee member in charge of the Trade and Industry ministry.
- Mr. John Billy Momanyi works as the Count Executive Committee member in-charge of the Land, Housing, Physical Planning and Urban Development ministry.
- Mr. Amos Andama Nyamoko is the Count Executive Committee member coordinating the Education, Labour and Manpower Development docket.
- Dr. Skitter Wangeci Ocharo is the Count Executive Committee member in the Energy, Water Environment and Natural resources ministry.
- Mr. Moses O. Onderi works as the Count Executive Committee member in-charge of Finance and Economic Planning.
