= KFF Normalization Committee =

Kenya Football Federation (KFF) normalisation committee was an entity that was formed in July 2004 by FIFA's Emergency Committee following a FIFA ban on Kenya on 2 June 2004. The Fifa Emergency Committee had suspended KFF on account of government interference in the business of the KFF and violation of the Fifa Statutes.

== Committee Chair ==
The normalisation committee was chaired by Kipchoge Keino, the then president of National Olympic Committee of Kenya (NOCK), and a member of the International Olympic Committee (IOC).

== Committee members ==
At the proposal of Keino, the normalisation committee included Sherrie Bailey as Vice Chair, the outgoing chair of KFF Maina Kariuki, four (4) club representatives; Mark Ageng of Re-Union and Kadir Farah (from KFF official league), Bob Munro and Mathews Guy (from rebel league), Haroun Bomet, Peter Angwenyi, Peter Onalo, Erasmus Munyi, Mbarak Said, Noordin Taib (six representatives from grassroot football), Sammy Nyongesa (representing coaches), Aziz Mohammed (representing referees), Albert Oketch (representing players), and one representative from Sports Ministry as an observer but without a vote, as members. Aziz was later suspended from the committee.

== Committee secretary ==
Keino later named Sylvester Ashioya as his secretary. Implementation of the Normalization committee led to the lifting of ban on Kenya by FIFA on 6 August 2004, and the readmission of Kenya to the qualifying rounds of the 2006 Fifa World Cup.
