= Ogembo =

Coordinates: 0°48′S 34°43′E

Ogembo is a small farming town in Kisii County, Kenya. Her inhabitants are the abagusii community. The town started around 1860 by the locals and around 1920s it became a commercial center for the Indians and a government centre for the colonial rule in the area. The surrounding area is well known for banana farming and tea farming. Ogembo is located 380 km west of Nairobi and has a population of 20,000.

It's a vibrant and growing town with major facilities, including Ogembo Level 4 Hospital, Bomachoge Chache subcounty offices, and Tendere Tea Factory. Many residents are of the Seventh-day Adventist denomination, and Saturday serves as a major day of rest for many residents

Ogembo, Kenya was featured in a November 2017 episode of the American television show Dr. Phil.
