= Nyacheki =

Town in Kenya

Nyacheki is a town in the Gucha District in western Kenya. Villages surrounding this town include Nyabiosi, Bendera, Naikuru, Tukiyamwana, and Mochengo. Nyacheki is located along Keroka Nyangusu road and is a 45 minutes drive from Maasai Mara. It is 10 minutes away from Kiamokama tea factory.

The area around Nyacheki is primarily agricultural. The main cash crop is tea, complemented by other subsistence farming crops such as maize, beans, and varieties of vegetables and fruits. Nyacheki has sufficient access to electricity and water, making conditions conducive to business. Space in downtown Nyacheki is used for both commercial and residential development. Businesses include supermarkets, banks, and other businesses. Wednesdays and Sundays are market days that bring in both sellers and buyers to the market for the trading of goods. There is one tarmac road that connects Keroka and Kilgoris and there are dirt roads that lead to Nyabiosi, Mochengo, Itibo and Kiamokama.

The town borders the highlands of the Maasai Mara, a large game reserve in Narok County, Kenya.

== Education ==
There are several schools in the area, such as Nyacheki primary, Naikuru primary, Chitago primary, Ebiosi primary, Isena primary, Goroba Primary, Rionsoti Primary, Keera Primary, Simiti primary, Mochengo Primary, and Nyamuya Primary. The area has also several secondary schools like Mochengo, Chitago, Ebiosi Isena girls, Isena mixed, and Naikuru Nyacheki secondary schools. and Isena High School.

== Religion ==
The major religious groups in Nyacheki are Seventh-day Adventists, Pentecostal Christians, Lutherans and Catholics.

== People ==
Nyacheki is hometown to leaders such as the late senior chief Bogomba Bisera, the late Gilbert Onsare Aenda and the late councilor Dickson Ogenche. Both helped make the town an administration division headquarter center.
