= Richard Momoima Onyonka =

Kenyan mp

Richard Momoima is a Kenyan senator. He belonged to the People's Democratic Party and was elected to represent the Kitutu Chache Constituency in the National Assembly of Kenya since the 2007 Kenyan parliamentary election. He is now a Ford Kenya Party member and retained his seat through this seat in the August 2017 elections.
