= Peoples Democratic Party (Kenya) =

Political party in Kenya

The Peoples Democratic Party (PDP) is a political party in Kenya.

== History ==
The PDP was established in 1992. It won a single seat in the 2007 general elections, Richard Momoima Onyonka in Kitutu Chache Constituency. In 2010 Orange Democratic Movement (ODM) MP James Omingo Magara defected to the party after the ODM did not nominate him as its candidate in the South Mugirango by-election, which was held after Magara's victory in the 2007 elections was annulled due to irregularities. However, Magara was defeated in the by-election.

Onyonka defected to the ODM prior to the 2013 general elections, in which the PDP nominated 22 candidates. It received 0.8% of the vote, again winning a single seat; Onyango K'Oyoo in Muhoroni Constituency. The party also won the governorship of Migori County, where Okoth Obado was victorious. However, K'Oyoo and Obado both later defected to the ODM. In the 2017 general elections the party only nominated nine candidates for the National Assembly, with Magara being the sole Senatorial candidate. The party won two seats in the National Assembly, Oroo Oyioka in Bonchari and Innocent Momanyi in Bobasi.
