= Kinare (tribe) =

Kinare is a name given to one of the sub-tribes of the Ogiek community which is found within Kenya. The original name is Akiek pa Kinare. They generally spoke a Kalenjin dialect. A pre-colonial Kikuyu leader by the name of Waiyaki Wa Hinga had some roots in this community which has led to many theories being created about him being a Kalenjin and not a Kikuyu.
