= Alfred Sambu =

Kenyan politician

Alfred Wekesa Sambu (1944) is a Kenyan politician. He belongs to the Orange Democratic Movement and was elected to represent Webuye Constituency in the National Assembly of Kenya in the 2007 Kenyan parliamentary election.

He has a BSc degree in electrical engineering. He has been a board chairman of Kenya Power and Lighting Company.

He is the former chairman of AFC Leopards football club and Kenya Football Federation.
