= Sam Ongeri =

Kenyan politician

Amb. Prof. Hon. Samson Kegengo Ongeri E.G.H.
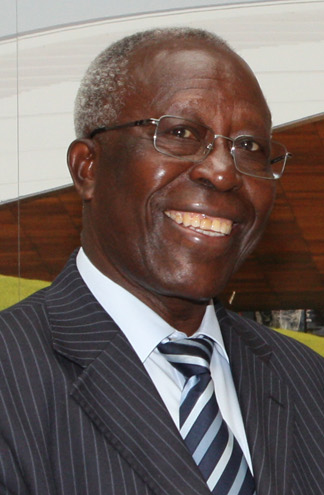
- Prof. Sam Ongeri 2012.

Former Senator Kisii County
- Retired
- In office 2017–2022

Ambassador Prof. Hon. Samson Kegengo Ongeri, EGH (born 23 February 1938) is a Kenyan politician. He is the former Senator for Kisii County.

== Early life ==
Ongeri was born on 23 February 1938, in Gesusu, Nyaribari Masaba.

== Political life ==
Hon Prof Sam Ongeri was first elected to Parliament in 1988 and was a member until 1992. He was overwhelmingly re-elected to represent the Nyaribari Masaba Constituency in the National Assembly of Kenya from 1992 to 1997. His tenure lasted until 2002. he was Minister of Education from 2007 to 2012 and Foreign Minister of Kenya between 2012 and 2013, and Permanent Representative to the UN-Habitat from 2015-2017 where he initiated and participated in the UN-Habitat’s reduced spatial inequality and poverty in communities across the urban-rural continuum, Enhanced shared prosperity of cities and regions, Strengthened climate action and improved urban environment and Effective urban crisis prevention and response. He unsuccessfully ran for office to represent Kisii County as a senator in 2013.

In 2017 he was elected as Kisii County Senator. He was the chairman of Athletics Kenya from 1974 to 1984.

On 12 September 2012, Ongeri was among a Kenyan delegation meeting in Mogadishu with newly elected Somali President Hassan Sheikh Mohamud, when two suicide bombers and two gunmen dressed in government uniforms attempted an attack on the Jazeera Hotel where the officials had convened. There were reportedly around 10 casualties, among which were three Somali security detail, one AU peacekeeper, and the assailants themselves. None of the assembled statesmen were harmed. The Al-Shabaab militant group later claimed responsibility for the attacks.

== Education ==
He attended the Gesusu Primary and Intermediate from 1943-51. Went to Bugema Missionary College 1952-57. Took a Pre-Medical Course at University of Delhi 1959-61. Took Bachelors of Medicine and Bachelor of Surgery from University of Bombay 1961-66. Attended University of London 1971-72, where he learned child health. Took his Pre-Board Examination at the University of Edinburgh 1970-72. Became a physician after graduating from Royal College of Physicians 1971-72. Took a WHO Course in Immunology at University of Nairobi 1973-76.

== Personal life ==
Ongeri is married to Dr Elizabeth and they have four children, Engineer Caroline, Nyagaka, Dr Sylvia, Dr Fiona. The Ongeri's are members of the Seventh-day Adventist Church and Hon Ongeri as a member of the Orange Democratic Movement.
