= Mohammed Hatimy =

Kenyan politician

Mohammed Hatimy is a former Kenyan politician, and chair of the Kenya Footbal Federation. He held various positions at the federation between 2005 and 2011.

He died due to suspected Covid-19 complications on 14 Nov 2020. At the time of his death he was a nominated Member of County Assembly in Mombasa County, and as the chair, Finance Committee of the Orange Democratic Movement (ODM) party in Mombasa
