= Maina Kariuki =

Kenyan Sports Administrator

Chair KFF
- In office 26 Mar 2000 – 24 Mar 2004
- Preceded by: Peter Kenneth
- Succeeded by: Alfred Sambu

Marketing & Television Advisory Board (FIFA)
- In office 2002–2003

Executive & Emergency committee (CECAFA)
- In office 2002–2003

Personal details
- Born: Maina Kariuki

Maina Kariuki was an East Africa region External Affairs Manager with US multinational Coca-Cola, and the Chair of Kenya Football Federation between the year 2000 and 2004 after succeeding Peter Kenneth. He died on 17 Aug 2021.

During his tenure as the head of Kenyan football, Kariuki also served as a committee member of FIFA's Marketing and Television Advisory Board, and in the executive and emergency committees of regional body CECAFA.

While at Coca-Cola, he also served on the board of Brand 8 Kenya in the year 2012.
