= Christopher Obure =

Kenyan politician

Hon. Christopher Obure
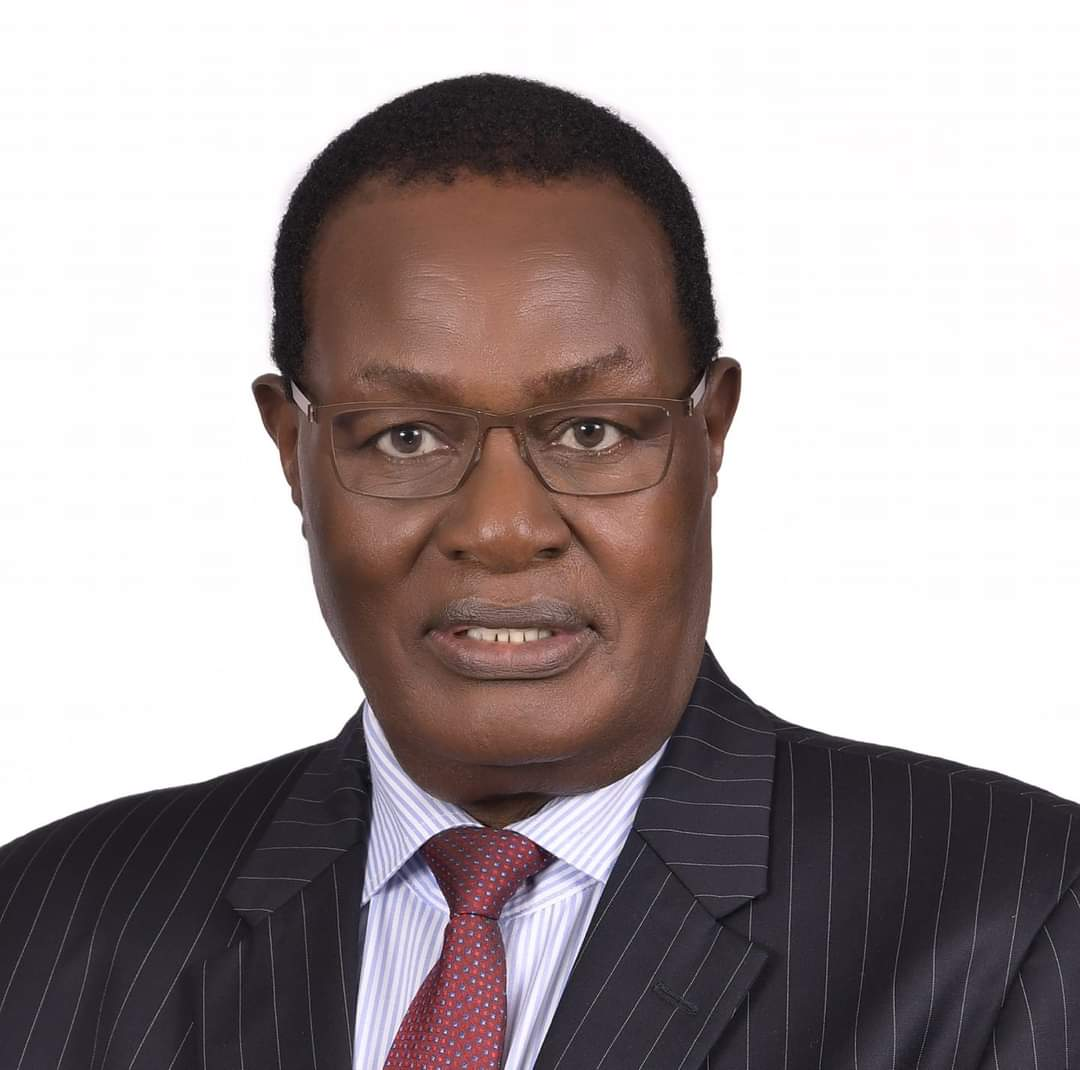

Member of the Kenyan Senate
- In office March 2013 – October 2017
- Constituency: Kisii County

Member of the Kenyan Parliament
- In office 2008–2013
- Constituency: Bobasi

Personal details
- Born: 29 September 1943 (age 83) Bobasi, South Kavirondo, Kenya Colony
- Party: Orange Democratic Movement (2007 -2017) [Jubilee Party since 2017]
- Children: 5
- Education: University of Nairobi (BCom)
- Occupation: Politician

Christopher Mogere Obure (born 29 September 1943) is a Kenyan politician. He belongs to the Jubilee Party and was elected on an ODM ticket to represent the Bobasi Constituency in the National Assembly of Kenya in the December 2007 parliamentary election. He was born in Boigesa Village on 29 September 1943. He worked for Bata Shoe Company and Kenya Breweries Limited (now East Africa Breweries) before joining politics.In 2017, he joined Jubilee Party to contest for gubernatorial seat where he lost to incumbent, James Ongwae. In 2022, he again contested for gubernatorial seat on Jubilee ticket and again lost to Simba Arati of ODM . He was the Minister of Public Works in the Government of National Unity. He was the first Senator of Kisii County. Obure is also well remembered as the first non-Luo player to be recruited in Gor Mahia F.C, and was among the squad which played during the club's inaugural season in 1968 and 1969.
