= Nick Mwendwa =

Kenyan Sports Administrator

Nicholas Kithuku Mwendwa
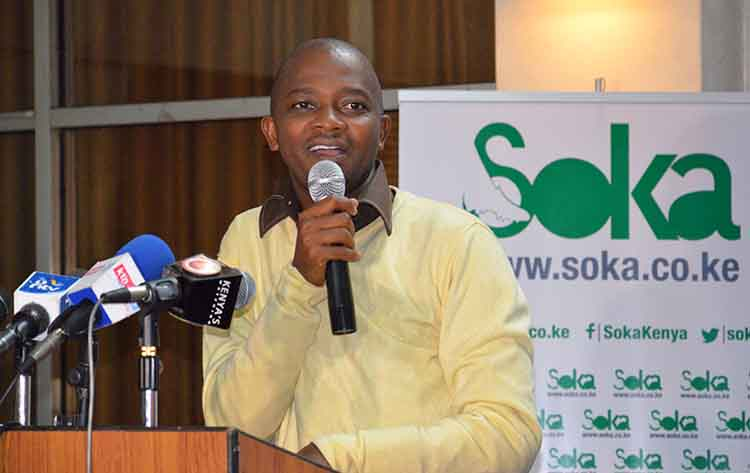

2nd President of FKF
- In office 10 February 2016 – 7 December 2024
- Preceded by: Sam Nyamweya
- Succeeded by: Hussein Mohammed

FKF TMS Manager
- In office 2011–2014

Chairman, FKF Premier League
- In office 2015–2016

Personal details
- Born: Nicholas Kithuku Mwendwa; 29 December 1979 (age 46) Makueni County, Kenya

Nicholas Nick Kithuku Mwendwa (born 29 December 1979) is a Kenyan businessman, entrepreneur, founder of Kariobangi Sharks, and the former president of Football Kenya Federation.

== Early life, education & professional career ==
Mwendwa was born in Makueni County on 29 December 1979. He went to Makindu 'A' primary school then joined Kiserian Junior Seminary and Thomeandu Secondary School for his secondary education, after which he attended the Kenya College of Accountancy in 1997 from where he graduated with a Diploma in IT. He later pursued and completed a Bachelor of Science Business in Management/Leadership from Bottega University in February 2023.

After completing his IT course, Mwendwa was among a young set of IT professionals hired to deploy robust retail payment solutions at Uchumi's chain of supermarkets. He then founded innovative payment and channel solutions firm Riverbank Solutions in 2009, before forming online shopping platform Swiggo Ltd in 2019, content hub Sweeton Limited in 2021, and DeFi platform Swerri, Zed Payments Ltd, a payments cloud service helping businesses to set up and accept mobile payments, all in 2022, among other businesses.

In March 2025, it was reported that Mwendwa offloaded 75% stake of his firm Riverbank Solutions to KCB.

== Football career ==
In the year 2000, Nick formed a football team in the precincts of Kariobangi and aptly named it Kariobangi Sharks. In 2011 he tried his hand in football politics where he unsuccessfully contested the Nairobi National Executive Committee (NEC) seat during an all-inclusive Kenyan football election. The same year he was named the FIFA Transfer Matching System (TMS) manager at the Federation, a post he served till the year 2014.

In 2015 he was named the chairman of FKF Premier League. It is while holding that capacity that he announced he would vie for the FKF Presidency during the upcoming elections.

== FKF presidency ==
Under Team Change wave, Mwendwa was elected as President of FKF on 10 February 2016 in his first stab at the top seat after garnering 50 out of the possible 77 votes in Kasarani to take over the reins from Sam Nyamweya. In regards to Football elections in Kenya, Mwendwa became the 14th elected football boss since Independence.

He retained his seat in the next election held on 17 October 2020 after polling 77 of the possible 85 votes.

In being FKF President, he has had to deal with critics who have always pointed out a conflict of interest as he always maintained an association with his club Kariobangi Sharks.

In November 2021 he was arrested on a few occasions for alleged misappropriation of funds soon after the Kenyan Government disbanded the Federation following an audit report. He was later arraigned and charged in court over the same. With the case on, he opted to step down and hand over his roles as the FKF President to his deputy Doris Petra.

He announced his return as FKF President on 9 September 2022, and re-opened the FKF offices on 20 September 2022. He was cleared to fully resume his presidential duties at FKF on 29 March 2023 after charges preferred against him were dismissed. The case against him was termed defective, unlawful, unconstitutional, and an abuse of the court process.

== FIFA council interest ==
In September 2018, Mwendwa threw his hat in the ring for a FIFA Council seat alongside four other candidates from Confederation of African Football countries. He later stepped down due to what he termed was influenced by "politics on the floor."

Days after his re-election in Oct 2020, Mwendwa yet again declared interest in vying for the same seat but once again backed down prior to the election held in March 2022.

Sporting positions
Preceded by -	Chairman of Kariobangi Sharks; 2000 - 2016	Succeeded by Robert Maoga
Preceded by Ronny Oyando	Football Kenya Federation TMS Manager; 2011 - 2014	Succeeded by Phoebe Amuyunzu
Preceded by -	Chairman of FKF Premier League; 2015 - 2016	Succeeded by -
Preceded by Sam Nyamweya	President of Football Kenya Federation; Feb 2016 - Dec 2024	Succeeded by Hussein Mohammed
