= Kisii County =

Coordinates: 0.666667°S 34.75°E

- County
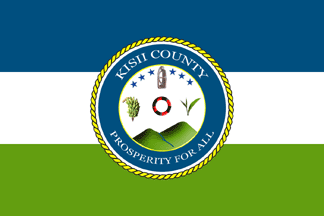
- Flag

- Location in Kenya
- Country: Kenya
- Formed: 4 March 2013
- Capital: Kisii
- Sub-counties: List: Etago; Gucha; Gucha South; Kenyenya; Kisii Central; Kisii South; Kitutu Central; Marani; Masaba; Nyamache; Sameta

Government
  - Governor: Simba Arati

Area
  - Total: 1,317.9 km^{2} (508.8 sq mi)

Population (2019)
  - Total: 1,266,860
  - Density: 961.27/km^{2} (2,489.7/sq mi)

GDP (PPP)
  - GDP: ▲$6.0 billion (10th)(2022)
  - Per Capita: ▲$4,504 (2022) (22nd)

GDP (NOMINAL)
  - GDP: ▲$2.23 billion (2022) (10th)
  - Per Capita: ▲$1,654 (2022) (22nd)
- Time zone: UTC+3 (EAT)
- Website: www.kisii.go.ke

Kisii County is a county in the former Nyanza Province in southwestern Kenya. Its capital and largest town is Kisii. The county has a population of 1,266,860 people according to the 2019 Kenya Population and Housing Census . It borders Nyamira County to the North East, Narok County to the South, and Homa Bay and Migori Counties to the West. The county covers an area of 1,318 km^{2}.

== People ==
The county is inhabited mostly by the Abagusii people.

=== Religion ===
Religion in Kisii County

Religion (2019 Census)	Number
Catholicism	429,285
Protestant	575,994
Evangelical Churches	188,755
African instituted Churches	26,226
Orthodox	2,538
Other Christian	16,062
Islam	2,753
Hindu	351
Traditionists	445
Other	9,078
No Religion Atheists	8,574
Don't Know	354
Not Stated	98

== Demographics ==
There is total population of 1,266,860 of which 605,784 are males, 661,038 females and 38 intersex persons. There are 308,054 household with an average household size of 4.1 persons per household and a population density 958 people per square kilometre.

Distribution of population by sex and sub-county
Sub-County	Male	Female	Intersex	Total
Etago	40,137	43,647	3	83,787
Gucha	39,631	44,108	1	83,740
Gucha South	40,022	43,598	3	83,623
Kenyenya	62,859	68,878	3	131,740
Kisii Central	81,330	85,573	3	166,906
Kisii South	64,514	70,615	5	135,134
Kitutu Central	74,608	79,561	6	154,175
Marani	50,598	56,864	2	107,464
Masaba South	58,143	64,248	5	122,396
Nyamache	62,113	68,782	3	130,898
Sameta.	31,829	35,164	4	66,997
Total	605,784	661,038	38	1,266,860

== Climatic conditions ==
Kisii receives an average rainfall of 1500 millimeters, with long rains falling in March and June. Maximum temperature range between 21–30 °C (70–86 °F) and minimum temperatures range between 15–20 °C (59–68 °F).

== Administrative and political units ==
=== County leadership ===
Simba Arati is the current governor after clinching the seat with 270,928 votes in the 2022 election. Robert Monda served as his deputy between August 2022 and March 2024 who was impeached by the senate and in his place the governor nominated Elijah Obebo, Richard Onyoka as the county senator, and Donya Toto as the county Woman Representative at the National Assembly.

James Ongwae was the first governor after being elected in 2013 and re-elected in 2017 for a second and final term. He was deputized by Joash Maangi Gongera. Prof. Samson Ongeri is the senator and joined office in 2017 after flooring the first senator of the county Chris Obure. Janet Ongera is the woman representative and second to hold office, Mary Keraa-Otara being the first elected women representative.

For Kisii County, the County Executive Committee comprises:

County Executive Committee
	Number
The Governor	1
The Deputy Governor	1
The County Secretary	1
The CEC Members	10
Total	13

=== Administrative units ===
There are nine constituencies, eleven sub-counties, forty five county assembly wards, one hundred and three locations and two hundred and thirty seven sub-locations.

=== Political units ===
The county has nine electoral constituencies: The county has eleven sub-counties. They are derived from the same constituency boundaries but two constituencies, Bobasi and South Mugirango, have two sub-counties each. The sub-counties often work directly with national government.

- Bobasi Constituency
  - Nyamache sub-county
  - Sameta sub-county
- Bonchari Constituency
  - Kisii South sub-county
- Bomachoge Borabu Constituency
  - Kenyenya sub-county
- Bomachoge Chache Constituency
  - Gucha sub-county
- Kitutu Chache North Constituency
  - Marani sub-county
- Kitutu Chache South Constituency
  - Kitutu Central sub-county
- Nyaribari Chache Constituency
  - Kisii Central sub-county
- Nyaribari Masaba Constituency
  - Masaba South sub-county
- South Mugirango Constituency
  - Etago sub-county
  - Gucha South sub-county

== Education ==
There are 1079 ECD centres 1081 primary schools and 371 secondary schools. The county has also 1 teachers training colleges, 49 Youth Polytechnics, 63 Technical, vocational education and training (VET) 158 adult training, 1 University and 3 university campuses.

Education Institutions in County
Category	Public	Private	Total	Enrolment
ECD Centres	701	378	1079	124,991
Primary schools	705	376	1081	321,082
Secondary schools	350	21	371	114,166
Youth Polytechnics	49	0	49	3,882
Technical, Vocational Education and Training	63	0	63	
University	1	0	1	
University Campuses	3	0	1	
Adult Education Centres	158			9,502

== Health ==
There are a total of 168 health facilities in the county with one county referral hospital. County has 462 health personnel of different cadre.

Health Facilities by Ownership
	Government	*FBO	Private	NGO	TOTAL
Hospitals	15	3	7		25
Health centres	21	6		1	28
Dispensaries	81	7	2	1	91
Clinics	3	1	19	1	24

*FBO – Faith Based Organizations

== Transport and communication ==
The county is covered by 1,131.8 km of road network of which 669.2 km is earth roads, 292.6 km is murrammed and 170 km are tarmacked.

== Trade and commerce ==
The county is part of the Lake Region Economic Bloc (LREB) established in 2018 to foster regional economic, industrial, social, and technological collaboration.

There are 102 trading centres, 16,199 registered businesses, 12,110 licensed retail traders, 49 supermarkets, 365 licensed wholesale traders.

== See also ==
- Nyamira County
