= Eagle Alliance =

- Leader: Peter Kenneth
- Coalition Partners: KNC; POA
- Senate: 0 / 67
- National Assembly: 2 / 349

The Eagle Alliance is a coalition between the Kenya National Congress and the Party of Action for the Kenyan general election of 2013. Its presidential candidate was Peter Kenneth, the former member of parliament for Gatanga Constituency. Kenneth's running mate was Ronald Osumba.
