= Mwenda Karisa =

Kenya's ambassador to Cuba

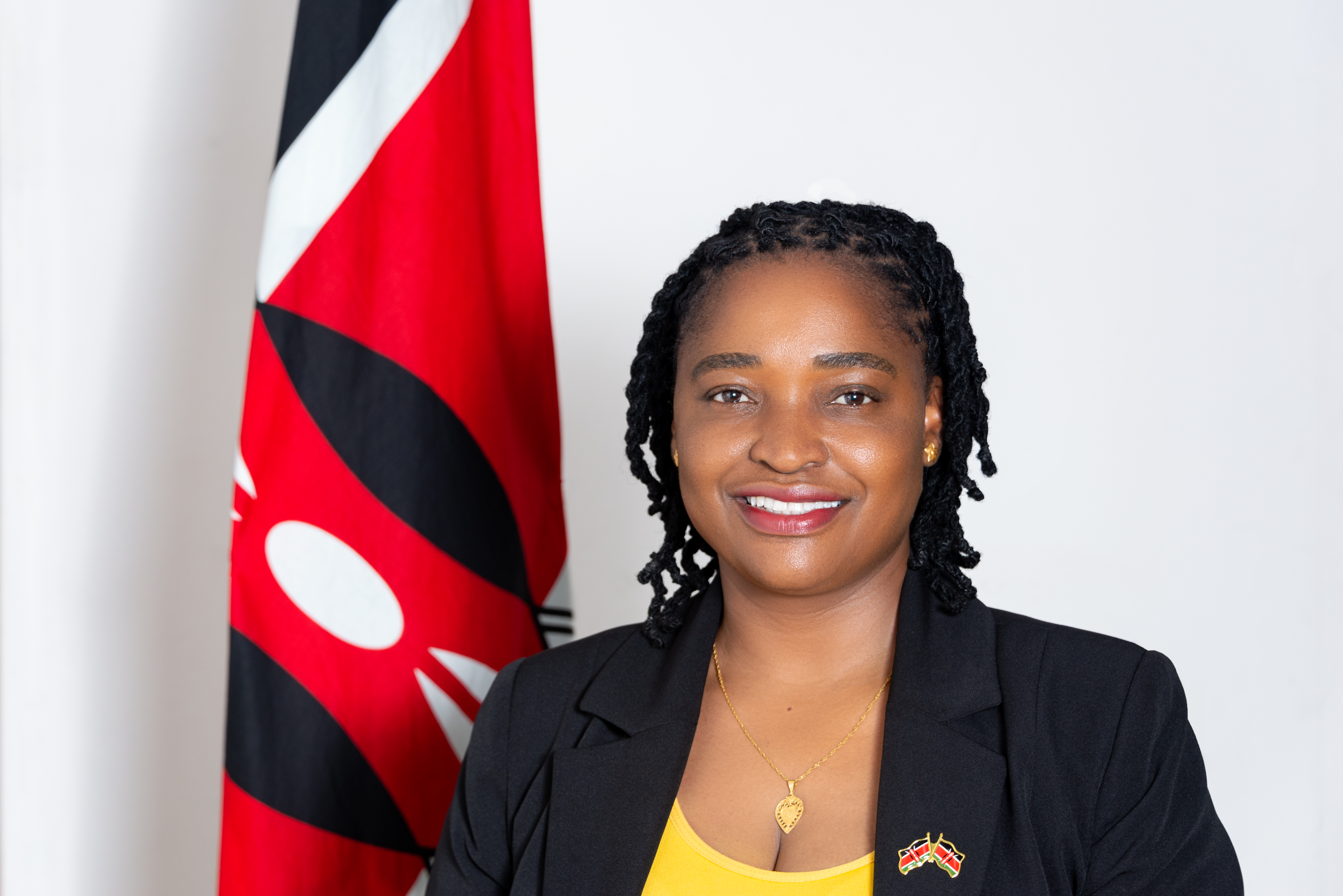
Mwenda Karisa

Everlyne Mwenda Karisa (born 10 October 1981) is a Kenyan diplomat serving as Kenya's High Commissioner to Jamaica. She previously served as Kenya's ambassador to Cuba . As a public administrator, she has served in both Kenyan County and National government positions since 2007.

== Early life and education ==
Karisa was born in Ganze Sub County Kilifi County. She is the daughter of Mzee Karisa Kamotso and Mama Dama Karisa.

Karisa attended Mwarandinda Primary School and Maryhill Girls High School. She graduated with First Class Honours in Cultural Studies (Anthropology) from Moi University. In 2013, she earned a Masters degree in Gender and Development Studies from the University of Nairobi.

She is married with three children.

Karisa has undergone professional training in leadership and management over the years, attending among others Kenya School of Government, Kenya School of Adventure and Leadership and Kenya Institute of Administration.

== Diplomatic roles ==
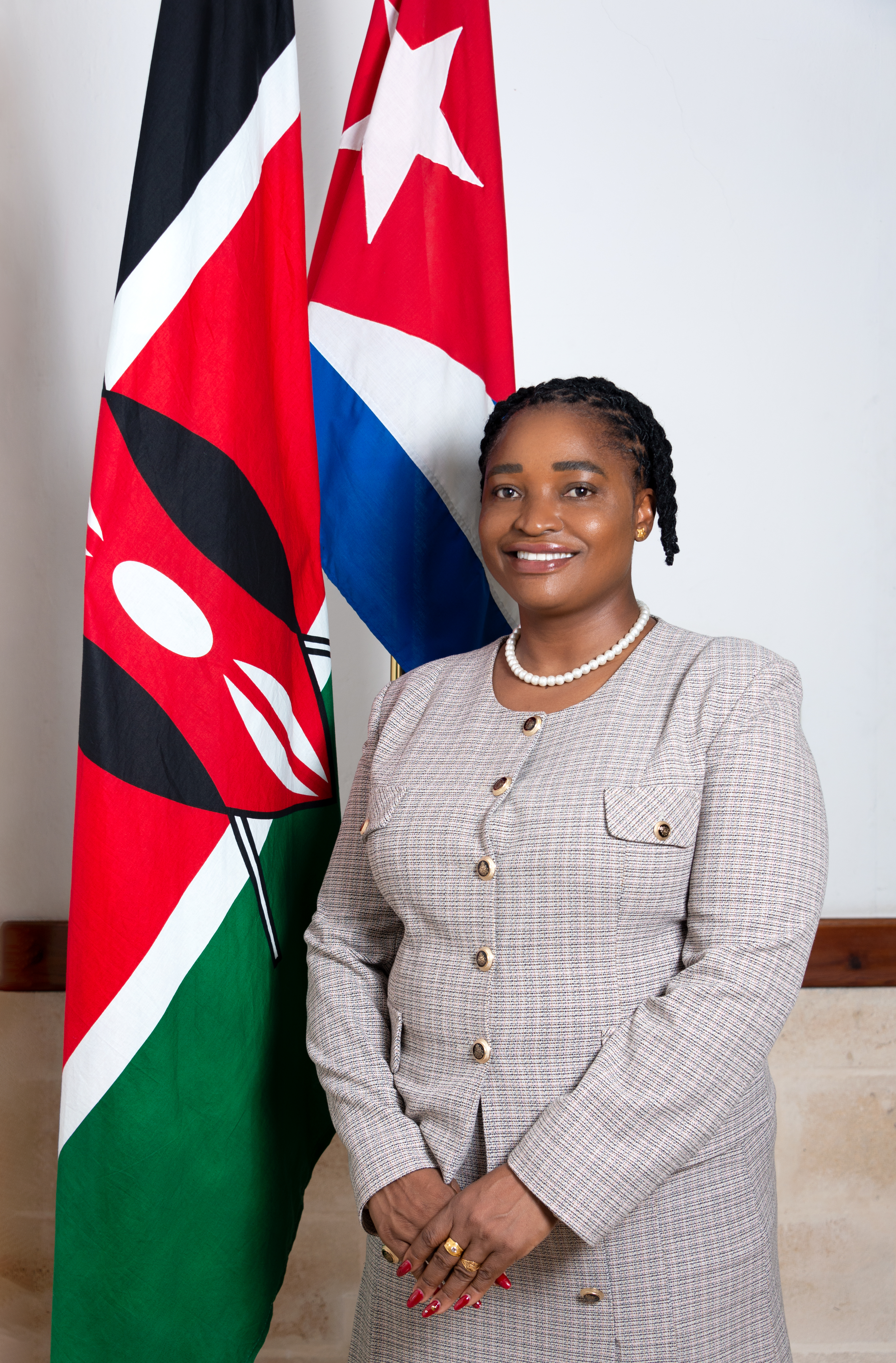
Mwenda Karisa

Karisa was appointed by the President of Kenya as ambassador designate to Cuba in March 2024. She was the ambassador and plenipotentiary, based in Havana. She coordinated the bilateral ties between Kenya and Cuba, promoting trade and cultural exchanges. Besides managing the operations of the embassy, she represented Kenya in international forums.

In July 2026, Karisa arrived in Kingston, Jamaica, to take up her new role as the first Kenyan High Commissioner to Jamaica.

== Public Administration ==
Between August 2023 and March 2024, Everlyne served as the Chief Administrative Officer at Bandari Maritime Academy where she was in charge of communications, finance, policy development, human resources, stakeholder relationship among others.

Before that, she was Chief Officer (2018 - 2022) in the County Government of Kilifi serving both the Department of Gender, Culture, Social Services and Sports, and the Department of Education and ICT. While working there, she oversaw overall administration, developing development strategies, compliance and procurement policies, and legal and institutional frameworks.

From 2014 to 2018, she developed county policies while heading Kilifi County public service.

== Governance ==
Everlyne worked for the National Government in the Office of the President and Ministry of Provincial Administration and Internal Security as the District Officer of Kirinyaga Central, Gichugu, and Ngong Divisions. She also served as the first Sub County Administrator Kilifi North Sub County between 2014 and 2018. As a District Officer, she coordinated state functions, interpreted and disseminated government policies as well as maintaining civil society-local authority relationships.

== Early career ==
Everlyne started her career in the civil service by interning at the Coast Development Authority as a Program Field Officer. There, she mobilised the public to form Community Based Organisations and trained them in leadership and management. In 2005, as Kenya worked on the draft new constitution, she was Civic Education Facilitator conducting civic education on the draft constitution. She also worked as a Research Assistant with Research International between 2006 and 2007.

Everlyne has served as board member in a number of schools. She was also a founding member of Kilifi Watoto Centre.
