= Humphrey Kimani Njuguna =

Kenyan politician

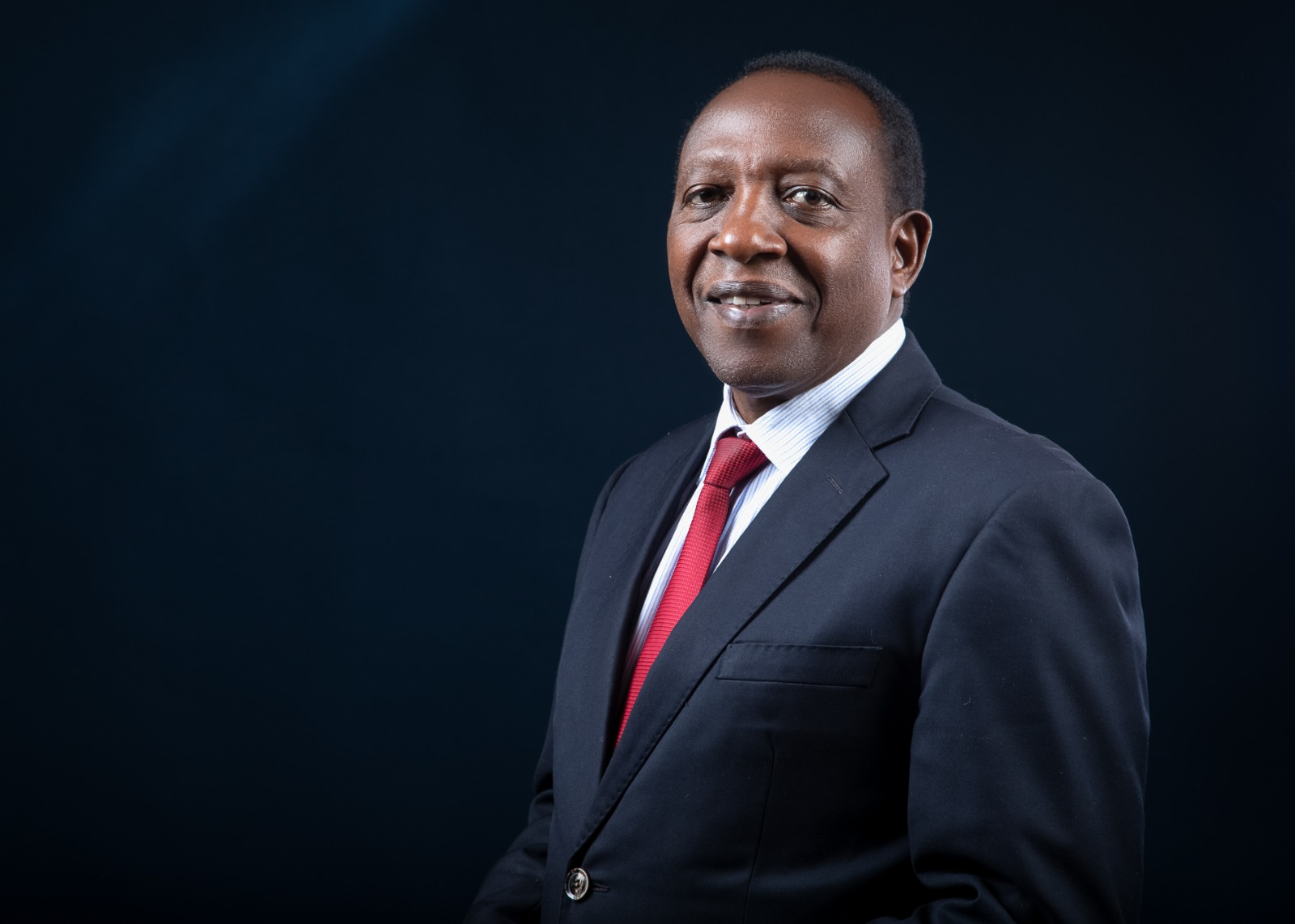

Dr. Dr. Humphrey Kimani Njuguna

Dr. Humphrey Kimani Njuguna Ph.D (Law), Ph.D (Enterp) (born July 19, 1961) is an Advocate of the High Court of Kenya, Valuer, Arbitrator, and former Member of Parliament. He has held numerous leadership positions in both the public and private sectors, including Chairmanship of the Institution of Surveyors of Kenya, Moi University Council, Rivatex and the Parents and Teachers Association at Mang'u High School. He also served as the Member of Parliament for Gatanga Constituency .

Early life and education

Humphrey Kimani Njuguna was born on July 19, 1961, in Kiangige Village, Gatanga. He was the seventh born in a family of thirteen children to Henry Njuguna Nikola, a clinical officer attached to the Kenya Forest Service, and Esther Wanjiru. He attended Kamunyaka Primary School and later enrolled at Chinga High School for his O-level studies, before completing his A-level education at Lenana School, where he excelled in athletics and served as the senior sports prefect. Following his secondary education, he took a gap year during which he taught at Giachuki High School. He subsequently joined the University of Nairobi, where he pursued a degree in Land Economics.

Professional career

Professionally, Njuguna is a licensed and registered Valuer, inducted onto the Valuers Roll of Honour as Fellow No. 003 in 2002. He has also been awarded the Valuers Excellence Award in recognition of his outstanding contribution to the growth and development of the land and built environment in 2003. He is an Advocate of the High Court of Kenya, a Chartered Arbitrator (MCIArb.), a Lead Expert in Environmental Impact Assessment and Environmental Audit, and a Court Annexed Mediator. He serves as an Adjunct Lecturer at the School of Law, University of Nairobi. He is currently the Managing Director of Metrocosmo Limited, a Senior Partner at Kimani Njuguna Advocates, and Chairman of the Former Parliamentarians Association (FOPA).

Valuation career

Between 1999 and 2003, Njuguna served as Chairman of the Institution of Surveyors of Kenya (ISK). During his tenure, he championed Nairobi's successful bid to host the International Conference on Spatial Information for Sustainable Development, held on October 2, 2001. The conference, the first of its kind in Africa, was organized jointly by the ISK, the International Federation of Surveyors (FIG), and UN-HABITAT. It attracted over 25,000 delegates to Kenya, greatly enhancing the stature of the surveying profession, generating substantial foreign exchange earnings, and bolstering the country's international recognition.

In his professional capacity as a valuer, he served as the chief consultant for the formulation of Tanzania's first national Valuation Roll, a World Bank-funded project aimed at establishing a comprehensive property and asset database. He also acted as the chief valuer for the United Nations Development Programme (UNDP) in Rwanda, where he was tasked with taking stock of national assets in the aftermath of the 1994 genocide, contributing to the country's post-conflict reconstruction and asset recovery efforts.

Mang'u High School PTA Chairmanship & BOG Memebership (2001–2015)

From 2001 to 2007, Njuguna served as Chairman of the Parents and Teachers Association (PTA) at Mang'u High School, and subsequently as a member of the school's Board of Governors from 2007 to 2015. During his tenure as PTA Chair, he spearheaded initiatives aimed at improving teaching staff welfare, and introduced performance-based incentives for students. These efforts enhanced the school’s performance in the Kenya Certificate of Secondary Education (KCSE) examinations.

Public Procurement Oversight Authority (2012–2013)

He served as a board member of the Public Procurement Oversight Authority from 2012 to 2013.

Member of Parliament for Gatanga (2013–2017)

Njuguna, politically popularly known as "Roho Safi," was elected as the Member of Parliament for Gatanga Constituency on a National Rainbow Coalition (NARC) ticket, serving from 2013 to 2017 at the advent of devolution. During his tenure, he prioritized substantial capital investment in educational infrastructure through the National Government Constituencies Development Fund (NG-CDF). The initiative was driven by persistently low academic achievement in the constituency during the early years of devolution, which had seen the area consistently rank at the bottom of national examination results. By the end of his term in 2017, the constituency had improved its standing by two positions.

Through the NG-CDF, he purchased a Toyota Hilux double cab for the District Education Officer to aid in the supervision of schools, and each of the six wards received a communal school bus to assist with school trips. In conjunction with the Ministry of Education, he also campaigned for the construction of the Gatanga Technical and Vocational College.

During his parliamentary term, he served as Deputy Chair of the Parliamentary Committee on Security, a role that placed him at the center of legislative oversight during one of the most challenging periods for national security in Kenya's history. His tenure coincided with a wave of unprecedented terrorist attacks perpetrated by the Al-Shabaab militant group. These included the Westgate shopping mall siege (September 2013), which claimed 67 lives; the Mandera bus attack (October 2014), in which 28 people were killed; the quarry attack in Mandera (December 2014), with 36 fatalities; the Garissa University College massacre (April 2015), in which 148 people were killed; and multiple assaults in the coastal Lamu region. As Deputy Chair, he was involved in shaping legislative responses to the escalating threat posed by Al-Shabaab and other militant groups operating in the region.

Moi University Council Chairmanship / Rivatex East Africa Limited and Moi Teaching and Referral Hospital (MTRH)

Njuguna served as Chairman of the Moi University Council. During his tenure, he pioneered the cultivation of Wambugu Apples as a strategic initiative aimed at generating alternative sources of internal revenue. The program was designed to mitigate the financial constraints that have persistently affected Moi University, a challenge that remains endemic to public institutions of higher education across Kenya. By promoting agricultural entrepreneurship, the initiative sought to reduce the institution's over-reliance on dwindling exchequer allocations.

He also served as Chairman of Rivatex East Africa Limited and as a board member of the Moi Teaching and Referral Hospital (MTRH) on various dates between 2020 and 2023.

Legislative drafting

In his professional capacity as an advocate, Njuguna participated in the policy formulation and legislative drafting of several key pieces of legislation, including the Estate Agents Act and the Traditional Medicines Bill.

Current roles

He currently serves as the Managing Director of Metrocosmo Limited and Chairman of the Former Parliamentarians Association (FOPA), which brings together all former Members of Parliament since Kenya's independence. He also serves as a Senior Partner at Kimani Njuguna Advocates.

== Educational background ==
2012 - 2017: PhD Law (UoN)

2010 - 2015: PhD (JKUAT) Entrepreneurship.

2008 - 2010: Executive Masters of Business Administration (EMBA)

2008 - 2009: JKUAT. Certificate of Environmental Impact Assessment and Environmental Audit.

2003 - 2005: LLM University of Nairobi - (International Trade and Investment Law)

2003 - 2005: Diploma (Kenya School of Law)

1999 - 2003: L.L.B. Hons, (University of Nairobi)

1990 - 1990: Diploma (Institution of Surveyors of Kenya)

1983 - 1986: B.A. (Land Econ), Hons University of Nairobi

1980 - 1981: K.A.C.E. - Lenana School

1976 - 1979: E.A.C.E. - Chinga Boys High School

== Achievements as MP for Gatanga ==
1. The lobbying and implementation of the following tarmac roads in Gatanga Constituency;

- Gatiiguru - Macvast - Ithanga Road.
- Kirwara - Kigio - Jogoo Kimakia Road.
- Gatura - Ndakaini Road.
- Kimandi- Kirangi - Gatakaini Road.
- Karingaini - Nyaga - Jasho - Mukurwe - Njaini - Gitiri - Mariano Road....among others...

This totals to about 220 kms of tarmac.

2. He delivered the following notable water projects in the constituency:

- a. Chomo and Kimakia water intake
- b. Water treatment plant at Rwegetha
- c. Belgian mega water project for Lower Gatanga
- d. Negotiated for 10% of water distribution to Gatanga residents on completion of the Northern Water Collector Corridor works.

Once these water projects are completed, every residence in Gatanga shall have access to clean and adequate

drinking water.

3. The renovations and construction of over 80 primary schools in Gatanga constituency, a model that is being replicated in the entire Country.

4. New construction of Wanduhi Primary School, Kiangige Primary School, Mwea Primary School, Karangi Secondary School, Giteme Secondary School among others.

5. Erection of 48 high security masts (mulika mwizis). Transforming Gatanga into one of the most lit - up Rural constituencies in Kenya.

6. Construction of 15 boda boda sheds with inbuilt attendant enabling shops.

7. Purchase of a Toyota Hilux for the D.E.O to help in supervising schools.

8. Purchase of a school bus for all Gatanga Primary Schools.

9. Purchase of a Toyota Landcruiser for the CDF constituency office.

10. Construction of Gatanga Technical Training Institute at Ndunyu Chege

11. Starting the construction of the proposed level 4 hospital at Ndunyu Chege

12. Construction of over 10 Police housing units at Kirwara Police station

13. Sinking of 3 boreholes

14. Construction of Kiandiu bridge

15. Conclusively dealing with the land ownership problem at Kihiu Mwiri.

16. Sponsored 56 all-inclusive medical camps.

17. Sponsored the Gatanga CDF Soccer League

18 Sponsored the licensing of over 3000 Boda Boda Riders

19. Re-instituted the award of very transparent and accountable Bursary Scheme in the constituency

20. Constructed 7 modern markets in various centers across Gatanga that have boosted and empowered local Entrepreneurship.
