= Joyce Kithure =

Second Lady of Kenya since 2024

Second Lady of Kenya
- Assumed role 1 November 2024
- Deputy: Kithure Kindiki
- Preceded by: Dorcas Rigathi

Personal details
- Born: Meru District, Kenya
- Spouse: Kithure Kindiki
- Children: 3
- Education: University of Nairobi
- Profession: Senior Lecturer in Environmental Chemistry

Joyce Gatiiria Njagi Kithure is the Second Lady of Kenya and a senior lecturer in Environmental Chemistry at the University of Nairobi. She has a strong academic background, with a focus on environmental processes and their impacts, and is involved in various community initiatives alongside her role as Second Lady.

== Early life and education ==
Kithure was born in the 1970s in Meru District, Kenya. She earned a Bachelor of Science, a Master of Science, and a PhD in Environmental Chemistry from the University of Nairobi, focusing on environmental processes and their impact on ecosystems.

== Personal life ==
Joyce Kithure is married to Kithure Kindiki, the deputy president of Kenya. They wedded in 2001, and have three children.
