= Hassan Omar Hassan =

Kenyan politician

The Right Honourable Hassan Omar Hassan

Member of the Fifth East African Legislative Assembly
- In office December 2022 – Present

Secretary General- United Democratic Alliance
- In office August 2024 – Present
- Preceded by: Cleophas Malala

Senator in the Kenyan Parliament
- In office 2013–2017

Personal details
- Born: Hassan Omar Sarai; 23 October 1975 (age 50) Mombasa, Kenya
- Party: United Democratic Alliance
- Other political affiliations: Kenya Kwanza
- Spouse: Asli Osman Mahamud
- Children: Yes
- Education: Moi University; Lenana School
- Occupation: Politician
- Profession: Lawyer

Hassan Omar Hassan (born 23 October 1975), is a Kenyan lawyer, human rights advocate, and politician currently serving as the secretary general of the ruling United Democratic Alliance (UDA) since 2024. He also serves as a member of the East African Legislative Assembly (EALA). Hassan previously represented Mombasa County in the Kenyan Senate from 2013 to 2017 and held senior positions in several political coalitions, including serving as secretary general of the Wiper Democratic Movement.

Hassan began his career as a student leader and political activist at Moi University and rose to national prominence as a commissioner and vice chairperson of the Kenya National Commission on Human Rights (KNCHR), where he led campaigns on security sector reform and accountability, including the landmark report The Cry of Blood. He is a recipient of the Sergio Vieira de Mello Human Rights Award in 2011.

== Early life and education ==
Hassan Omar Hassan was born on 23 October 1975 in Mombasa, Kenya to Omar Hassan Sarai and Aisha Abdallah Suleiman Mazrui. His mother was a very close relative to the late Prof. Ali Mazrui who influenced the intellectual and ideological viewpoints of the young Hassan. Hassan grew up in a neighbourhood of great history and civilization of Kibokoni, Old Town in Mombasa.

Hassan attended Mombasa Primary School before joining Lenana School for his secondary education. In 1994, Hassan briefly trained as a Kenya Air Force cadet at the Armed Forces Training College before enrolling at Moi University to study law. During his time at university, Hassan became actively involved in student leadership and political activism, serving in various roles including chairman of the Moi University Students Organization, Kenya National Students Union, and the Council for University Students of East Africa.

== Human rights advocacy ==
Hassan’s involvement in human rights began with organizations such as the Supreme Council of Kenya Muslims (SUPKEM), Muslims for Human Rights (MUHURI), and the Muslim Consultative Council, among others. He received training at the Les Aspin Center for Government in Washington, D.C., and played a key role in advocacy for democratic reforms leading up to the 2002 Kenyan general elections. In January 2007, aged 31, Hassan was appointed as a commissioner of the Kenya National Commission on Human Rights (KNCHR), making him the youngest appointee to a constitutional commission in Kenya. At KNCHR, Hassan led efforts in security sector reform, anti-corruption advocacy, election monitoring, and transitional justice. He was noted for spearheading campaigns against extrajudicial killings, notably authoring The Cry of Blood report, which drew international attention. In 2011, Hassan received the Sergio Vieira de Mello Human Rights Award in Poland, in recognition of his contributions to human rights advocacy.

== Political career ==
In March 2013, Hassan was elected senator for Mombasa County under the Wiper Democratic Movement-Kenya and the Coalition for Reforms and Democracy (CORD). In the Senate, he served as Vice Chair of the Committee on County Public Accounts and Investments, and was a member of committees on legal affairs, human rights, and devolved government. Hassan sponsored the Preservation of Human Dignity and Enforcement of Economic and Social Rights Bill (2015), aimed at implementing Article 43 of the Constitution on social justice and equality.

Hassan also served as secretary general of the Wiper Party and was part of the management of both CORD and the National Super Alliance (NASA). During his tenure, he established the Renaissance Centre, a civic hub promoting public discourse, governance, and citizen participation. Hassan contested the Mombasa gubernatorial seat in the 2017 Kenya general election.

In 2022, he was elected to the East African Legislative Assembly (EALA), where he represents Kenya. Hassan served as vice chairman of the United Democratic Alliance (UDA) from February 2023 and took over the position of secretary general of the ruling party on 2 August 2024.

== See also ==
- East African Legislative Assembly
- Mombasa County
- United Democratic Alliance
