= Democracy for the Citizens Party =

Political party in Kenya

- Abbreviation: DCP
- Leader: Rigathi Gachagua
- Chairperson: David Mingati
- Secretary-General: John Methu
- Founded: 3 February 2025; 21 months ago
- Headquarters: Musa Gitau Road, Muthangari Drive, Lavington, Nairobi
- Ideology: Social democracy
- Colours: Neon green, brown, white, red
- Slogan: Skiza Wakenya ("Listen to Kenyans")

Election symbol
- Hand cupping a listening ear

Website
- dcpkenya.com

The Democracy for the Citizens Party (DCP) is a Kenyan social democratic political party. It was founded on 3 February 2025 by former Deputy President Rigathi Gachagua.

== History ==
The party was granted full registration by the Office of the Registrar of Political Parties on 3 February 2025. It was officially launched by Rigathi Gachagua on 15 May 2025 at its headquarters in Lavington, Nairobi. It was formed nearly 6 months after the impeachment of Gachagua as the Deputy President of Kenya.

== Leadership ==
Key leaders are:

- Party Leader: Rigathi Gachagua
- Deputy Party Leader: Cleophas Malala
- Interim Secretary General: John Methu
- National Organising Secretary: Mithika Linturi
- National Women Leader: Cate Waruguru

Other officials include David Mingati who serves as its Chairperson and Maina Kamanda as Chairperson of the Council of Eminent Persons.

== Membership ==
=== Defections ===
On 6 August, ten Kirinyaga County Members of County Assembly (MCAs), including the Kirinyaga County Assembly Deputy Speaker Jinaro Jamumo, defected from their former parties to the DCP. On 17 November, Gachagua announced that three MPs; Gatundu South Constituency MP GG Kagombe, Laikipia West Constituency MP Wachira Karani and Nyeri County Woman Representative Rahab Mukami, had defected from United Democratic Alliance.

== Electoral performance ==
It won three Member of County Assembly (MCA) by-elections performed on 27 November 2025 in the wards of Kisa East which is in Kakamega County, Narok Town and Kariobangi North. Aduda Okwiri's win at the Kisa East by-election was the DCP's first election victory.

Following the 29 March 2026 death of Ol Kalou Constituency Member of National Assembly David Njuguna Kiaraho, a by-election was held on 16 July 2026 to fill the vacancy left. On 17 July, Sammy Kamau Ngotho of the DCP was declared the winner by the Independent Electoral and Boundaries Commission (IEBC) in a landslide of 35,440 votes. His closest competitor was Samuel Muchina Nyaga of the United Democratic Alliance (UDA) with 5,450 votes, while Wilson Kigwa of the Jubilee Party had 198. There was a 57% voter turnout, with 41,656 of 73,480 registered voters participating.
