= Academic ranks in Kenya =

Academic ranks in Kenya are the titles, relative importance and power of professors, researchers, and administrative personnel held in academia.

== Overview ==
Kenya’s universities Act of 2012 defines an "academic staff" as a "person appointed to teach, train or to do research at a university and any other employee designated as such by the university council". The definition of professor is left to each individual university. Professors are primarily senior members of university teaching and/or research faculty. Generally, there is no clear distinction between research and academic. However, the University of Nairobi has a tradition of appointing faculty in both the research and academic streams, thus, junior research fellow assistant lecturer, research fellow lecturer, associate professorial research fellow associate professor and the professorial research fellow professor.

Both the associate and full professors must have PhDs or a qualification considered equivalent. In the Moi University and University of Nairobi, where they have a longer history offering medical qualifications, a post medical qualification Master of Medicine (M.Med.) is considered an equivalent of a PhD in other fields. So a holder of an M.Med. who has been a senior lecturer for three years, together with requisite publications and supervisions may be appointed associate professor, then full professor. In Moi University again, there is an example of a senior legal scholar and practitioner who was appointed full professor based on a personal evaluation. His long teaching experience, myriad academic and technical publications and his two LL.M.s were considered as equivalents. Generally lower degree holders can not go beyond the senior lecturer level; however, this is left for each university to decide. To be a full professor in all the Kenyan universities, one ought to have served as an associate professor for four years and at least three peer-reviewed publications in international journals or similarly considered technical publications. Technical patents too are considered. Postgraduate research supervision and outreach are also crucial.

In Kenyan higher education, some senior academic staff members who do not formally hold the rank of professor are informally addressed as "professor" by students, colleagues, or the general public. This practice often applies to experienced academics with significant teaching, research, or administrative contributions who have not received formal promotion. It may also extend to long-serving staff without a doctorate or younger academics who have not met the longevity requirements for a professorial appointment.

Many people rightly argue that professorial appointments should not be based on longevity, loyalty or sheer availability of vacancies to be filled, but rather on prowess as evidenced by ground breaking research, teaching and outreach. Professorship should not be a reward for loyalty. Whatever the criteria of appointment, it should remain a mark of highest academic and research pedigree, they assert.
