= 2013 Narok local elections =

Local elections in Kenya

Local elections were held in Narok County to elect a Governor and County Assembly on 4 March 2013. Under the new constitution, which was passed in a 2010 referendum, the 2013 general elections were the first in which Governors and members of the County Assemblies for the newly created counties were elected.

== Gubernatorial election ==
Candidate	Running Mate	Coalition	Party	Votes
Kiptunen, Daniel Talengo	Kipkemoi, Koech Ngeno Cosmus		Independent	--
Konchellah, John Oloishuro	Rotich, Robert Kipngetich Simotwo		Kenya African National Union	--
Musuni, Joseph Tiampati Ole	Mutai, Kipkemoi Paul		Kenya National Congress	--
Nchoe, Johnson Parsamet	Tangus, John Kipruto A		Orange Democratic Movement	--
Nkoitoi, Francis Simiren	Sipitiek, Johnson Saruni		Wiper Democratic Movement – Kenya	--
Olekina, Ledama	Maritim, Juliet Chepkorir		Independent	--
Tunai, Samuel Kuntai	Evalyn, Aruasa		United Republican Party	--
