= Rigathi Gachagua =

Deputy President of Kenya from 2022 to 2024

His Excellency Rigathi Gachagua EGH
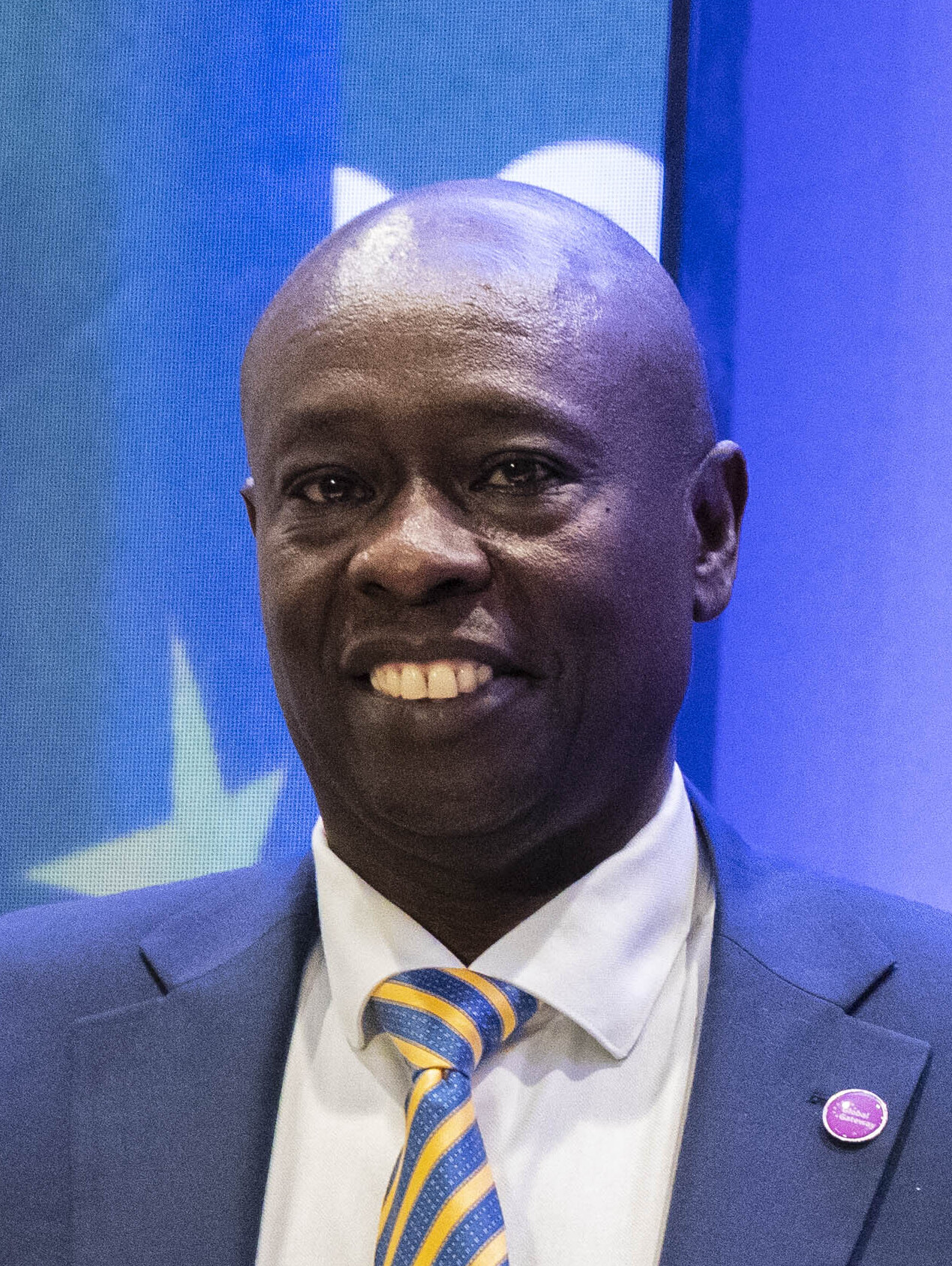
- Gachagua in 2023

2nd (12th Considering Vice president) Deputy President of Kenya
- In office 13 September 2022 – 1 November 2024
- President: William Ruto
- Preceded by: William Ruto
- Succeeded by: Kithure Kindiki

Member of the Kenyan Parliament
- In office 31 August 2017 – 8 September 2022
- Preceded by: Peter Weru Kinyua
- Succeeded by: Eric Wamumbi
- Constituency: Mathira

Personal details
- Born: 28 February 1965 (age 61) Hiriga, Nyeri District, Kenya
- Party: Democracy for the Citizens Party (DCP)
- Other political affiliations: United Democratic Alliance (UDA) (2022–2024)
- Spouse: Dorcas Wanjiku (m. 1989)
- Children: 2
- Education: University of Nairobi (B.A.); Kenya School of Government (Advanced Diploma in Public Administration)
- Occupation: Politician; Administrator; Businessman; Party Leader
- Nickname: Riggy G

Geoffrey Rigathi Gachagua (born 28 February 1965) is a Kenyan politician who served as the second deputy president of Kenya (office established under the 2010 Constitution). He served from 13 September 2022 until he was impeached in October 2024. As a member of the Jubilee Party, Gachagua served as Member of Parliament for Mathira from 2017 to 2022. He is also the Party leader of Democracy for the Citizens Party (DCP). which was launched on 15 May 2025.

He had previously served in various roles and positions in government, including as an Assistant secretary in the Ministry of Home Affairs and National Heritage, a personal assistant to the Head of the Public Service, a personal assistant to the then Minister for Local Government Uhuru Kenyatta, and as a District Officer (DO). In the 2022 election, William Ruto selected Gachagua as his running mate, and the two were elected with just over 50% of the vote.

On 8 October 2024, Gachagua was impeached by the National Assembly on 11 separate charges. He filed legal challenges against the impeachment, but they were rejected by the High Court. On 17 October 2024, The Senate upheld five of the 11 charges, related to the allegations of inflaming ethnic tensions through divisive speeches, promoting ethnic discrimination, violating oath of office, and attacking the National Intelligence Service (NIS) in public. As a result, the verdict of the Senate confirmed the impeachment and he ceased to hold office. Immediately after his removal by the Senate, President William Ruto nominated Kithure Kindiki to replace him. The swearing-in of Kithure Kindiki was however temporarily halted by the High Court via a conservatory order on 18 October 2024. An application to discharge the orders was made to the High Court. After heated court sessions, the conservatory orders were discharged, clearing the way for the swearing in of Deputy President nominee Kithure Kindiki.

== Early life and education (1965–1988) ==
He was born in 1965 in Hiriga village of Nyeri County, the child of Gachagua Reriani and Martha Kirigo. His parents were Mau Mau freedom fighters in Mount Kenya forest where his father serviced guns for the Mau Mau while his mother was a food and ammunition courier for the fighters. He is the younger brother to Nderitu Gachagua, the first governor of Nyeri County.

He enrolled at Kabiruini Primary School in Mathira Constituency in Nyeri from 1971 to 1977 before proceeding to Kianyaga High School for his O-levels and A-levels. In 1985, he joined the University of Nairobi, where he graduated with a Bachelor of Arts Degree in Political Science and Literature in 1988.

At the University of Nairobi, Gachagua was the Nyeri District University Students Association (NDUSA) leader as well as the chairman of the Association of Literature Students.

== Career ==
=== Civil Service ===
After graduating from the University of Nairobi with a Bachelor's degree in Political Science and Literature, Gachagua was employed for a short time at the Kenya's Ministry of Home Affairs & National Heritage before he joined the Administration Police Institute in 1990. After graduating from the institute, Gachagua was posted at the Office of President Daniel arap Moi as a District Officer Cadet between 1991 and 1992.

Gachagua then went on to serve as a District Officer in Navakholo Division, Kakamega District, and later in Ng'arua Division, Laikipia District. Between 1999 and 2000, he joined the Kenya School of Government where he graduated with an Advanced Diploma in Public Administration. Between 2001 and 2006, Gachagua worked as the Personal Assistant to Uhuru Kenyatta.

=== Business ===
Between 2007 and 2017, Gachagua remained behind the scenes running his businesses.

=== Political career ===
==== Member of Parliament ====
Gachagua was elected as a member of parliament for Mathira constituency, which was earlier held by his brother Nderitu, in the 2017 election.

Rigathi Gachagua is known for his aggressive and sometimes abrasive style of politics. His time as a legislator was characterized by championing issues that centered primarily on the needs of his Kikuyu tribe.

===== Legislation =====
In 2019, Gachagua sponsored an amendment bill to the Public Procurement and Asset Disposal Act, 2015. He argued that Kenyan firms could not fairly compete and would be run out of the market by Chinese firms that were able to get loans at less than a sixth the interest rates. The amendment reserved government contracts under 1 billion shillings for local companies and proposed stiffer penalties for circumventing the local ownership requirements for larger contracts. The bill would eventually be turned down by the National Assembly's Finance and National Planning committee, citing limited local capacity to provide goods and services as the reason.

==== Deputy president ====
On 15 May 2022, he was nominated as the running mate to the United Democratic Alliance presidential candidate William Ruto under the Kenya Kwanza political coalition. Others who were eyeing the same position included Kirinyaga Governor Anne Waiguru, Kandara MP Alice Muthoni Wahome, Tharaka Nithi Senator Kithure Kindiki and National Assembly Speaker Justin Muturi. During the campaign, he publicly accused former president Jomo Kenyatta, the father of outgoing president Uhuru Kenyatta, of responsibility over the assassination of opposition politician Josiah Mwangi Kariuki in 1975.

Gachagua has a chequered past with pending court cases over alleged cases of misappropriation of government funds, money laundering and corruption.

On 28 July 2022, a Kenyan court ordered Gachagua to reimburse KSh. 202 million (US$1.7 million), finding that the money was derived from corruption. When he became Deputy President, Gachagua threatened to take action against the Judge Esther Maina who gave the orders.

In November 2022, Gachagua faced corruption charges in a $60 million case. These charges were eventually dropped.

==== Impeachment ====
On 1 October 2024, a motion to impeach Gachagua was introduced in Parliament. This followed a deterioration in his relations with Ruto. Eleven grounds of impeachment were brought against him, including corruption, ethnic discrimination, violating oath of allegiance and undermining the President and Cabinet. A majority of 291 MPs signed their support for the measure. Gachagua appeared for hearing before the National Assembly and defended himself against the allegations. On 8 October 2024, 281 Members of the National Assembly voted in favour of the motion, with 44 against and one abstention. This is the first time under the 2010 Constitution that the National Assembly has voted to impeach a State Officer in the Presidency. The motion was then referred to the Senate for trial and final voting. Gachagua abruptly stormed out of the impeachment proceedings just before he could take the witness stand for cross-examination.

On 17 October, his lawyers informed the Senate that Gachagua had been hospitalized for chest pains just before cross-examination and the final vote that was expected to take place that evening. Despite this, the Senate rejected a proposal to adjourn for two days and proceeded with the trial. Following a majority vote by the Senate, Gachagua was impeached on five of the 11 charges laid against him. He was set to be replaced as deputy president by the then Cabinet Secretary for Interior and National Administration Prof. Kithure Kindiki but the High Court temporarily halted the swearing-in of his successor pending further orders on 24 October. The court discharged the temporary orders on 31 October, clearing the way for the swearing-in of his successor.

On 13 September 2025, Gachagua announced his intention to run against Ruto for president in the 2027 Kenyan general election.

== Personal life ==
Rigathi is married to Dorcas Rigathi, a retired banker and now a pastor in Mathira.

They met at a joint university event at the University of Nairobi in 1985. They got married in 1989 and have two sons, Kevin and Keith.

National Assembly (Kenya)
Preceded by Peter Weru Kinyua	Member of the Parliament for Mathira; 2017–2022	Succeeded by Eric Mwangi Kahugu
Party political offices
New political party	UDA nominee for Deputy President of Kenya; 2022	Most recent
New political alliance	Kenya Kwanza nominee for Deputy President of Kenya; 2022	Most recent
Political offices
Preceded by William Ruto	Deputy President of Kenya; 2022–2024	Succeeded by Kithure Kindiki
