= 2013 Wajir local elections =

Local elections in Kenya

Local elections were held in Wajir County, Kenya, to elect a governor and county assembly on 4 March 2013. Under the new constitution, which was passed in a 2010 referendum, the 2013 general elections were the first in which governors and members of the county assemblies for the newly created counties were elected.

== Gubernatorial election ==
Candidate	Running mate	Coalition	Party	Votes
Mohamed Abdi Mahamud	Abdullahi Nur Sheikh Kassim		United Republican Party	--
Ahmed Abdullahi Mohamad	Abdulhafid Abdullahi Yarow	Cord	Orange Democratic Movement	--
Mohamed Ali Mursal	Abdirahmand Maalim Abass		Kenya National Congress	--
Maalim Mahamed Omar	Ibrahim Hanshi Omar		United Democratic Forum Party	--
