= Eunice Wanjiku Kamaara =

Eunice Wanjikū Karanja Kamaara
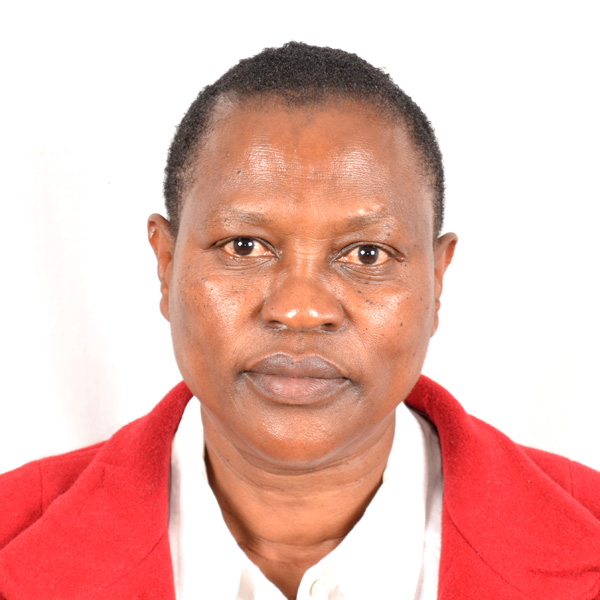
- Born: January 5, 1965 (age 61); Ngemwa, Kiambu County.
- Occupations: Professor of Religion at Moi University, Eldoret, Kenya
- Spouse: Francis Karanja Kamiri

Academic background
- Education: PCEA Ngemwa Primary School Kiambu High School, Bachelor of arts, University of Nairobi, MPhil in Religion, MSc. in International Health Research Ethics, and PhD in African Christian Ethics. Moi University, Eldoret
- Alma mater: University of Nairobi, Nairobi, Kenya & Moi University, Eldoret, Kenya

Academic work
- Discipline: Religious Studies
- Sub-discipline: African Christian Ethics Social anthropologist
- Institutions: Moi University, Eldoret

Eunice Wanjikū Karanja Kamaara (born January 5, 1965) is a professor of religion at Moi University, Eldoret, Kenya. Her area of specialization is African Christian Ethics. She is an International Affiliate of Indiana University–Purdue University Indianapolis, Indiana, US. Wanjiku has authored over 100 publications. She is the founder and Director of African Character Initiation Program (ACIP), a program that facilitates adolescents to embrace their identities and African character values through information, life skills, and values training including on sexual and reproductive health and rights. Wanjikū is a Top 30 World Health Organization (WHO) Africa health innovator recognized for her work with young people in the African Character Initiation Program (ACIP). Her research and publications focus on holistic development and practice from socio-anthropological, ethical, gender, and social health perspectives.

== Early life ==
Wanjikū was born on January 5, 1965, in Ngemwa village, Kiambu District (now Kiambu County), in Kenya. She is the last born child of Stephen Mwaūra Kamaara and Anne Nduta Kamaara. She is married to Francis Karanja Kamiri and they have two children. Wanjikū was born into and nurtured in a Presbyterian Church of East Africa (PCEA) family. She later became a Roman Catholic by marriage and is a Christian by choice.

== Education ==
Wanjikū began her education at PCEA Ngemwa Primary School from 1971 to 1978. She attended Kiambu High School from 1979 to 1984 where she sat for her Ordinary level and Advanced level examinations. She attended the University of Nairobi in 1986, and four years later, earned a Bachelor of Arts in Sociology and Religion. In 1993, she graduated with a Master of Philosophy in Religion from Moi University, Eldoret. She earned a Doctor of Philosophy in Religion from Moi University in 2003. Wanjiku did postdoctoral studies in Gender Mainstreaming, and later earned a Master of Science in International Health Research Ethics degree. She delivered her inaugural lecture at Moi University in 2012.

== Career ==
Eunice Wanjikū Karanja Kamaara is a professor of religion, whose specialization is in African Christian Ethics with interests in the intersection of Religion and health, Holistic development research, Gender and Intersectionality studies. She began her teaching career at Mother of Apostles Seminary in Eldoret, Kenya, from 1989 to 1990. She later joined Moi University as a Graduate assistant (1992–1993) and rose through the ranks to Associate Professor (2006–2012) and a full professor (2012).

== Leadership ==
Wanjikū is the founder and Director of the African Character Initiation Program (ACIP), which she, with others, founded in 2004. This program accompanies adolescents through their identity and sexual crises and facilitates them to embrace their identity and African character values by building their confidence and self-esteem, through information, life skills and character values.

Wanjikū is a co-director of the Chaplaincy Training Centre at Moi University in collaboration with Moi Teaching and Referral Hospital, Kenya. The Centre integrates spiritual care in hospital settings, leadership, and teaching and learning. She has consulted for the World Council of Churches (WCC), the World Bank, United States Agency for International Development (USAID), the United Nations Population Fund (UNFPA), Templeton World Charity Foundation (TWCF), and Institute of Development Studies/Partnership for African Social Governance Research (PASGR). She has served on international boards such as the Church World Service, and the Médecins Sans Frontières (MSF) ethics review board. Her consultancies are in the areas of Research, Teaching and Learning and in Mainstreaming Gender, Diversity, and Inclusivity.

== Awards ==
Eunice Wanjikū Karanja Kamaara is a Top 30 WHO Africa health innovator recognizing her work with the youth in the African Character Initiation Program (ACIP). She is an SRF Fellowship (2018) recipient at Indiana University Purdue University Indianapolis (IUPUI) and has won several grants including the McNamara Fellowship of the World Bank, Humboldt Foundation (Collaborative Africa Partner of the Humboldt Research Hub in Africa); Templeton World Charity Foundation Inc., among others. She serves as Ethics Advisor and reviewer for many international organizations and projects for example funded by European Union, and National Institutes of Health. She is a Member of Kenya National Academy of Sciences, and, a Fellow of Uganda National Academy of Sciences.

== Selected works ==
- Kamaara, E. (2015). "The Challenges of Social Change to the African family: a Situational Analysis". In The Anthropology of Africa: Challenges for the 21st Century, edited by Paul Nchoji Nkwi, Mankon, Bamenda, Cameroon: Langaa Research & Publishing CIG. pp 347–360
- Kamaara, E. (2022). "Identity, Religion/Spirituality, Character Values, and Development in Youthful Africa". In: Chitando, E., Kamaara, E. (eds.), Values, Identity, and Sustainable Development in Africa. Sustainable Development Goals Series. Palgrave Macmillan, Cham.
- Kiplagat, J., Njuguna, B., Kamaara, E. (2022). "Reprogramming HIV Prevention and Service Provision for Older Adults in Western Kenya". In: Brennan-Ing, M., Porter, K.E., Kaufman, J.E., MacPhail, C., Seeley, J. (eds.), Aging with HIV in Sub-Saharan Africa. Springer, Cham.
- D’Souza, J. Kamaara, E. Nderitu, D. (2021.) "All in this together: the global duty to contribute towards combating the COVID-19 pandemic". In Indian Journal of Medical Ethics.
- Palk, AC, Bitta M, Kamaara E. Stein DJ. and Singh, I. (2020) "Investigating assumptions of vulnerability: A case study of the exclusion of psychiatric inpatients as participants in genetic research in low‐ and middle‐income contexts". In Developing World Bioethics.
- Nderitu, D. Kamaara, E. (2020) "Gambling with COVID-19 Makes More Sense: Ethical and Practical Challenges in COVID-19 Responses in Communalistic Resource-Limited Africa". In Bioethical Inquiry (2020).
- Shitemi, N. Kamaara, E (eds.) (2014) Wanjiku: A Kenyan Socio-political Discourse, Nairobi: Goethe Publishers, Nairobi.
- Kamaara, E, Elisabeth T. Jeanine V. (2012) "Listening and Speaking as Two Sides of the Same Coin: Negotiating Dualisms in Intercultural feminist Collaboration". In Journal of Feminist Studies in Religion, Vol. 28, Number 2, Bloomington: Indiana University Press
- Kamaara, E. (2010) "Towards Christian National Identify in Africa". In Studies in World Christianity, 16.2 Pg126–144, Edinburgh University Press.
- Kamaara, E. (1999.) "Reproductive and Sexual Health Problems of Adolescent Girls in Kenya: A Challenge to the Church"> In Journal of Reproductive Health Matters.
