= Dorcas Wanjiku Rigathi =

Kenyan pastor and public advocate

Dorcas Rigathi
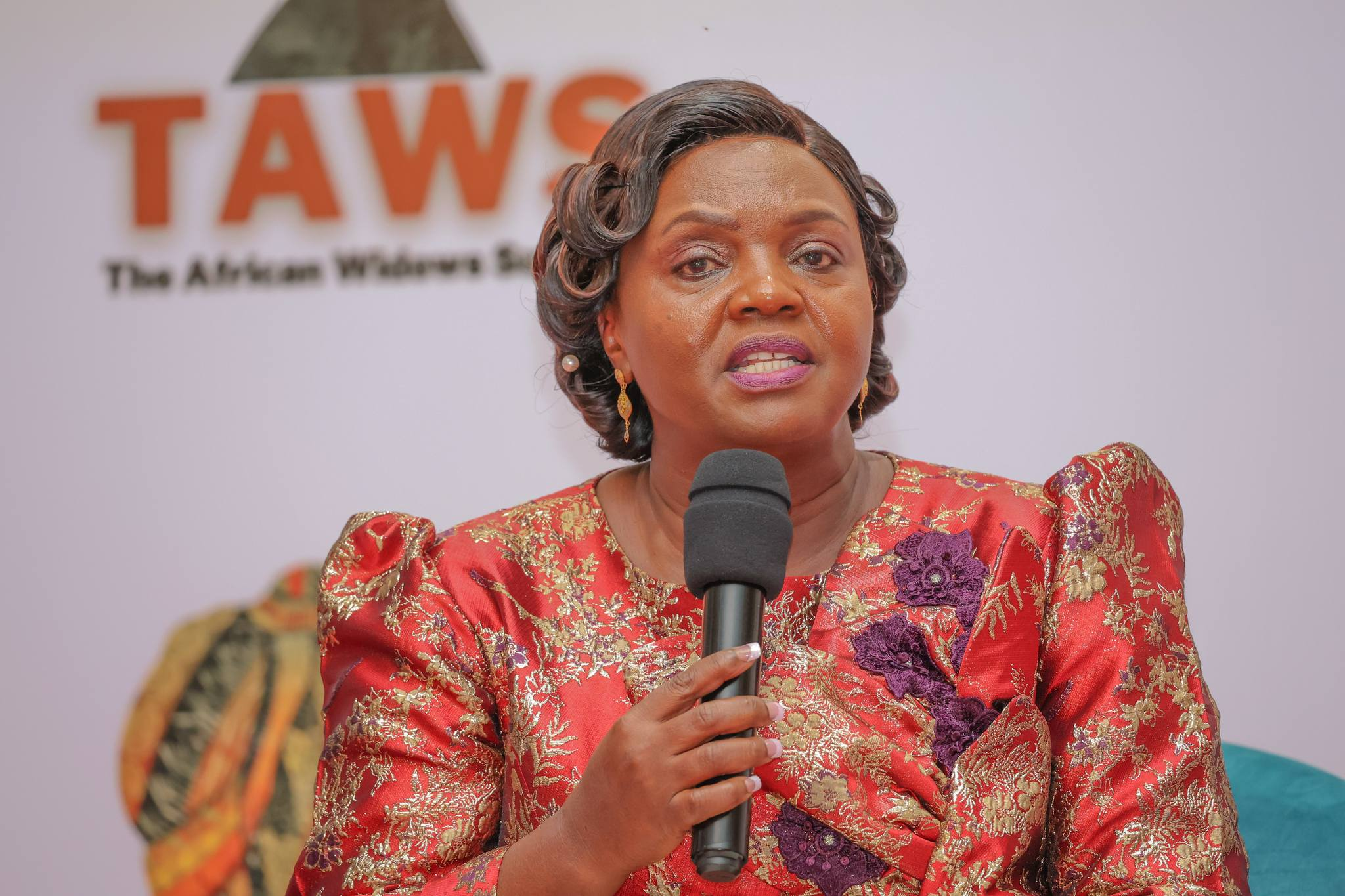
- Dorcas in 2023
- Born: Dorcas Wanjiku; 1965 (age 60–61); Ndunyu ya Chege, Gatanga, Murang'a County, Kenya
- Education: Kenyatta University
- Occupations: Pastor, public advocate
- Spouse: Rigathi Gachagua (m. 1989–present)
- Children: 2

Dorcas Wanjiku Rigathi (born 1965) is a Kenyan pastor and public advocate. She served as Kenya’s Second Lady during her husband Rigathi Gachagua’s tenure as Deputy President, from 13 September 2022 until his removal via impeachment on 17 October 2024. She led initiatives under the Office of the Spouse of the Deputy President (OSDP), including empowerment of the boy child, rehabilitation, and support for persons with disabilities, widows, and orphans. Kithure Kindiki assumed office as Deputy President on 1 November 2024.

== Early life and education ==
Dorcas was born in 1965 in Ndunyu ya Chege, Gatanga, Murang’a County. She grew up in Kiandutu, Thika, and attended Mugumo-ini Primary School. She attended Alliance Girls' High School. She studied at Kenyatta University, earning a Bachelor of Education (Arts), and later obtained a professional management diploma.

== Ministry ==
Dorcas serves at House of Grace in Nairobi. She began ministry work in 2002 and was ordained in 2011. Her work primarily supports widows, Persons with Disability (PWD) and the vulnerable in society.

== Public role and advocacy ==
Following the 2022 general election, Dorcas served as Second Lady after President William Ruto and Rigathi Gachagua were sworn in as President and Deputy President respectively on 13 September 2022. Through the OSDP, she led the “boy child” initiative, combining outreach clinics, rehabilitation, vocational training and graduations. She advocated for PWD inclusion through Special Olympics Kenya as patron. She partnered with agencies such as the National Authority for the Campaign Against Alcohol and Drug Abuse (NACADA) to establish rehabilitation centres.

== Awards and honours ==
In honor of her work with the community, especially widows, and her ministry, Dorcas received an Honorary Doctorate in Divinity from Breakthrough International Bible University in 2021.

She received the “Outstanding Catalyst in Vulnerable Empowerment Award” in September 2023 at the Africa Public Sector Awards.

== Personal life ==
Dorcas met Gachagua while studying at Kenyatta University while he studied at the University of Nairobi, and they married in 1989. They have two sons.

== See also ==
- Rigathi Gachagua
- Second Lady of Kenya
- Special Olympics Kenya
