= Dorcas Wangira =

Kenyan journalist

- Education: Moi University
- Occupation: Journalist
- Notable work: The App and The Cut
- Awards: Michael Elliott Award for Excellence in African Storytelling

Dorcas Wangira is a Kenyan journalist and reporter. With a report on the harm caused by female genital mutilation and the hope offered by five tech-savvy teenage girls, she won the 2019 International Centre for Journalists (IFCJ) Michael Eliott Award for Excellence in African Storytelling. Out of 218 applicants, her report titled The App and The Cut, which was aired on KTN News in June 2018, was selected as the winning report.

== Education ==
Wangira attended Moi University, where she studied Communication and Public Relations.

== Career ==
While in school, she had the opportunity to intern with the Standard Media Group in February 2014, after winning a joint competition sponsored by the Standard Group and UNDP. Prior to that, she worked at the Communications Commission of Kenya. After working with KTN news of the Standard Group at Kakamega for more than two years, in June 2017 she left to be a freelance journalist. Later, she worked with Citizen TV, a renowned television station in Kenya, owned by Royal Media Services. She spent two weeks at The Economist in the United Kingdom.

== Awards ==
- 2015 - Won the Mohammed Amin Africa Award for her story on maternal health in Samburu County
- 2018 - Nominated for Upstream Oil and Gas Journalist of the Year Award
- 2017 - Won the Zimeo Excellence in Media Award
- 2017 - Shortlisted for the Thompson Foundation Young Journalist of the Year Award
- 2019 - Won the 2019 Michael Elliott Award for Excellence in African Storytelling for The App and The Cut, which was the harm caused by female genital mutilation and the hope offered by five tech-savvy teenage girls
- 2019 - Won the Annual Journalism Excellence Award, Media Council of Kenya, ICT and Telecommunications Reporting Award: TV The award recognizes journalists who have written or produced outstanding articles/stories in the area of technological advancement to enable the public understand, embrace and use new inventions.
- 2020 - Won the Merck More Than A Mother 2019 MultiMedia Award, East African Countries.
- 2021 - Won the Isu Elihle Award for reporting on Children's Welfare
- 2021 - Selected as a Falling Walls Science Fellow
- 2022 - Won the Annual Journalism Excellence Award for Environmental Reporting (Digital Category)
- 2022 - Runners Up Merck Foundation, Mask Up Award for Eastern Africa Countries
