= Ronald Osumba =

Personal details
- Born: Kibera
- Children: 2
- Education: Moi University (BBM)

Ronald Osumba is a Kenyan who vied for Deputy President in the March 2013 Kenyan Presidential election on a Kenya National Congress ticket. He was the running mate to Peter Kenneth.

== Personal life and education ==
Osumba who was born and raised in Kibera completed his primary school education at Olympic Primary School and was later educated through charity at the Starehe Boys' Centre and School. He holds a degree in Business Management from Moi University, a diploma in Biblical Studies and is certified with the Association of Chartered Certified Accountants (ACCA). He is divorced, with 2 children.

== Career and community work ==
Osumba has worked in senior management roles at the Cooperative Bank of Kenya, Impax Business Solutions and Health Data Systems. Prior to his resignation to join politics, he was the senior sales manager for public sector at Safaricom.

Osumba has a hosted Hatua, a TV show on human rights. He is the board chairman of Youth Enterprise and Sustainability Kenya and funding advisor of the United Nations Youth Association of Kenya. He serves as a member of the Starehe Boys Centre management committee and patron of the Gem Youth Network.

== Political career ==
Osumba was named as Peter Kenneth's running mate in the Eagle Alliance after Raphael Tuju stepped down in Mr Kenneth's favour and gave him a free hand to choose a running mate.
