= Kithure Kindiki =

Deputy President of Kenya since 2024

His Excellency Kithure Kindiki EGH
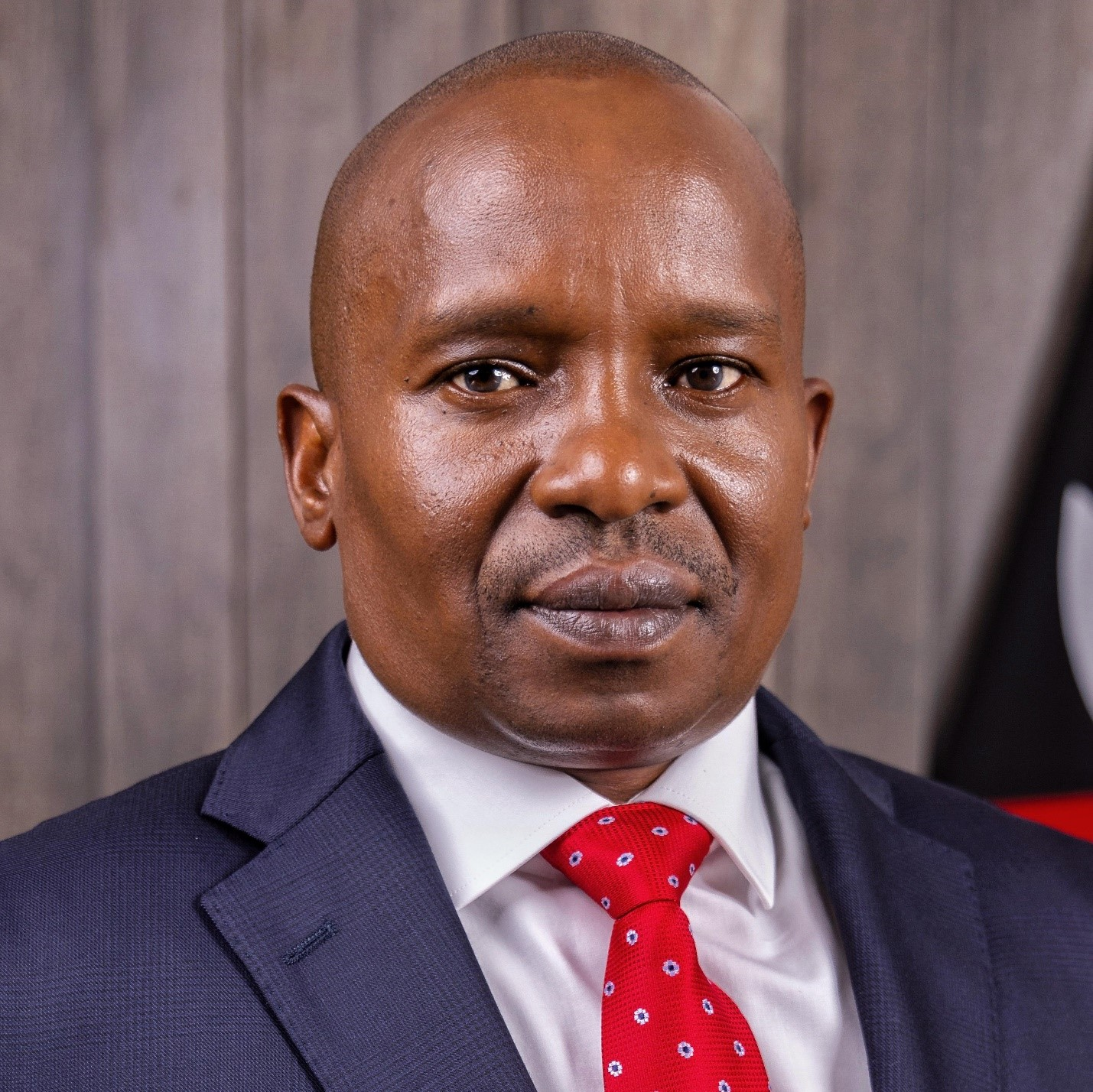
- Official portrait, 2024

3rd (13th Considering Vice president) Deputy President of Kenya
- Incumbent
- Assumed office 1 November 2024
- President: William Ruto
- Preceded by: Rigathi Gachagua

Deputy Party Leader of the United Democratic Alliance
- Incumbent
- Assumed office 11 November 2024
- Leader: William Ruto
- Preceded by: Rigathi Gachagua

Cabinet Secretary for Interior
- In office 22 October 2022 – 31 October 2024
- President: William Ruto
- Preceded by: Fred Matiang'i
- Succeeded by: Kipchumba Murkomen

Majority Leader of the Senate
- In office 28 March 2013 – 31 August 2017
- Preceded by: Position established
- Succeeded by: Kipchumba Murkomen

Senator for Tharaka-Nithi County
- In office 4 March 2013 – 9 September 2022
- Preceded by: Position established
- Succeeded by: Mwenda Getaya

Personal details
- Born: Abraham Kithure Kindiki; 17 July 1972 (age 54) Tharaka, Meru District, Eastern Province, Kenya
- Party: United Democratic Alliance (2021–present)
- Spouse: Joyce Njagi (m. 2001)
- Children: 3
- Education: Lenana School
- Alma mater: Moi University (BA); University of Pretoria (LL.M, PhD); Kenya School of Law (GDL)
- Occupation: Politician, lawyer

Abraham Kithure Kindiki (born 17 July 1972) is a Kenyan politician, lawyer and a former law professor who is the 3rd and current deputy President of Kenya since 1 November 2024. He previously served as the Cabinet Secretary for Interior and National Administration from 2022 to 2024 and as the Senator for Tharaka-Nithi County from 2013 to 2022.

In April 2024, Kithure Kindiki won the best performing Cabinet Secretary of the year award, presented by Politrack Africa.

== Early life and education ==
Kindiki was born and raised in Meru District. Kindiki attended Lenana School where he scored Grade C in his Kenya Certificate of Secondary Education (KCSE). Since this grade failed to meet university pass mark he decided to retake the exam at Tharaka Boys High School, in the then Meru District.

In 1998, he obtained a Bachelor of Laws degree (LLB) from Moi University. In 2000 he obtained a Master of Laws (LLM) in International Human Rights Law and Democracy from the University of Pretoria in South Africa. He also attended the Advocates' Post Graduate Diploma in Legal Studies at the Kenya School of Law in 2001, which is a requirement for one to qualify as an advocate after completing a bachelor's degree in law. In 2002, he graduated with a PhD in International Law from the University of Pretoria.

In 1999, he began working as a law lecturer at Moi University. He started working at the University of Nairobi in 2004 and remained there until 2005 when he returned to Moi University to lead the public law department.

== Political career ==
=== Senate ===
In the 2013 Kenyan general election, Kindiki was elected to represent Tharaka-Nithi County in the Senate. He was chosen to serve as the Senate's first majority leader. He was reelected in the 2017 election, and was chosen to be the Deputy Speaker of the Senate. In 2020, Kindiki was kicked out from the position of deputy speaker for his close association with the then Deputy President William Ruto.

=== Cabinet ===
Kindiki was among the top candidates considered to be William Ruto's running mates for his presidential campaign. Member of Parliament Rigathi Gachagua was chosen instead. Kindiki was instead appointed to serve as the Minister of Interior. Mwenda Gataya succeeded him as Tharaka Nithi senator. Kindiki was dismissed from the cabinet on 11 July 2024, but was reappointed back to the cabinet on 19 July 2024, as the Cabinet secretary for Interior and Administration of National Government.

Key among his achievements include: streamlining of e-passport issuance procedures and restoration of the supply of passport booklets, the Police Equipment Modernization programme significantly enhancing the capabilities of Kenya's security services; finalization of a strategic framework to commence implementation of Police Reforms recommended by the Hon. Justice David Maraga Taskforce; abolishment of the previous vetting processes for issuance of National Identity cards; recognition of minority groups and stateless communities ensuring they receive Kenyan citizenship and associated rights; operationalization of the Public Benefit Organizations Act; enhancing the fight against banditry and general insecurity around the country; development of a legislative proposal to amend the National Government Coordination Act of 2013 to officially recognize village elders in each unit; and enrolment of 13,120 inmates into formal education programs; among others.

Kindiki was nominated by President Ruto to become deputy president following the impeachment of Rigathi Gachagua on 17 October 2024 and received the approval of the Senate. However, his assumption of the position did not push through after the High Court ordered a temporary halt to Gachagua's removal on 18 October pending a hearing on 24 October 2024. On 31 October 2024, the Nairobi High Court overturned another court's order to stay Kithure Kindiki's swearing-in.

=== Deputy President ===
On 1 November 2024, following the impeachment of Rigathi Gachagua, Kithure Kindiki was officially sworn in as the Deputy President of the Republic of Kenya. He assumed the role under the administration of President Ruto.

== Controversy ==
=== Al shabaab Meetings ===
In August 2025, according to Gachagua, Kindiki was reported to have taken meetings with Al-Shabaab to secure release of 5 abducted chiefs in Mandera, who were reported to have been abducted by the Al shabaab militants. According to Gachagua, Kindiki can best identify Al shabaab leaders based on the successful negotiations he held with the militant's group leading to successful release of abducted Mandera chiefs.

== Personal life ==
He married Joyce Gatiiria Njagi in 2001. They have three children.
