= United Democratic Alliance (Kenya) =

Political party in Kenya

- Abbreviation: UDA
- Leader: William Ruto
- Chairperson: Cecily Mutitu Mbarire
- Secretary-General: Hassan Omar Hassan
- Governing body: National Executive Committee of the United Democratic Party
- Spokesperson: Hassan Omar Hassan
- Deputy Party Leader: Kithure Kindiki
- Senate majority leader: Aaron Cheruiyot
- National Assembly majority leader: Kimani Ichungwah
- First Treasurer: Japheth Nyakundi
- Founder: Hillary Yegon
- Founded: December 2020 (UDA) February 2012 (POA)
- Preceded by: Party of Development and Reforms
- Headquarters: Hustler Plaza, Ngong Road; Nairobi, Kenya
- Newspaper: Muungano
- Think tank: UDA Think Tank
- Youth wing: Comrades chapter
- Women's wing: National Women Congress
- Ideology: Conservatism
- Political position: Center-right
- National affiliation: Kenya Kwanza
- Colours: Yellow, Green (Official) Black, White (Customary)
- Slogan: Kazi ni Kazi ("Work Is Work.")
- Parliamentary group: Parliamentary Group
- Party Conference: National Delegates Congress (NDC)
- National Assembly: 144 / 349
- Senate: 32 / 67
- Governors: 22 / 47

Election symbol
- Wheelbarrow

Website
- uda.ke

The United Democratic Alliance (UDA) is the current ruling political party in Kenya. Their slogan is "Kazi ni Kazi" (A job is a job; All hustles matter) and their symbol is a wheelbarrow. The party, initially called the Party of Development and Reforms, officially changed its name to UDA in December 2020. The party became notable in January 2021, and is allied with William Ruto, the President of Kenya.

The party fielded candidates in March 2021 by-elections. UDA nominated Ruto in the 2022 Kenyan general election, after he announced that he would leave the Jubilee Party in late 2021. Ruto picked Rigathi Gachagua as his running mate for the elections.

In the 2022 general elections, UDA was able to garner 22 out of 47 seats in the Senate and 138 of the elected members of the National Assembly. The party uses a wheelbarrow as the party's symbol which stands for "worth, respect, and dignity of work in pursuit of an unbiased society". UDA is a member of Kenya Kwanza. Kenya Kwanza is the ruling coalition movement in Kenya.

== History ==
The party was established as the Party of Action (POA) in February 2012 by Hillary Yegon in order to contest the 2013 general elections. It later formed an electoral pact with the Kenya National Congress (KNC) for the 2013 general elections, which was formalised as the Eagle Alliance. The alliance nominated the KNC's Peter Kenneth as its presidential candidate. In the elections Kenneth finished fourth in the presidential contest with 0.6% of the vote. The Party of Action failed to win a parliament, receiving less than 0.05% of the vote.

Prior to the 2017 general elections, the party was renamed as Party of Development and Reforms (PDR), sometimes seen as the Party of Reforms and Development. In the elections the PDR endorsed incumbent President Uhuru Kenyatta, also winning four seats in the National Assembly and one in the Senate.

It officially changed its name to United Democratic Alliance (UDA) in December 2020.

== Electoral history ==
=== Presidential elections ===
Election	Party candidate	Running mate	Votes	%	Result
2013 (as Party of Action – POA)	Peter Kenneth	Ronald Osumba	72,786	0.60%	Lost
2017 (as Party of Development and Reforms – PDR)	None (endorsed Uhuru Kenyatta of Jubilee)	—	—	—	Won
2022 (as United Democratic Alliance – UDA)	William Ruto	Rigathi Gachagua	7,176,141	50.49%	Won

=== Senate elections ===
Election	Party leader	Votes	%	Seats	+/–	Position
2013 (as Party of Action – POA)	Peter Kenneth	5,108	0.04%	0 / 67	▲0	—
2017 (as Party of Development and Reforms – PDR)	—	—	—	1 / 67	▲1	—
2022 (as United Democratic Alliance – UDA)	William Ruto	—	—	32 / 67	▲31	▲1st

=== National Assembly elections ===
Election	Party leader	Votes		%	Seats	+/–	Position
2013 (as Party of Action – POA)	Peter Kenneth	Constituency	2,675	0.02%	0 / 349	▲0	—
2013 (as Party of Action – POA)		County	—	—	0 / 349	▲0	—
2017 (as Party of Development and Reforms – PDR)	—	Constituency	67,515	0.45%	4 / 349	▲4	—
2017 (as Party of Development and Reforms – PDR)	County	225,557		1.49%	4 / 349	▲4	—
2022 (as United Democratic Alliance – UDA)	William Ruto	Constituency	5,417,665	38.29%	145 / 349	▲141	▲1st
2022 (as United Democratic Alliance – UDA)	County	4,942,301		34.93%	145 / 349	▲141	▲1st
