= Vincent Makori =

Vincent Makori is a Media Executive and Television Managing Editor at Voice of America. He is also host of VOA’s flagship weekly current-affairs program Straight Talk Africa; VOA’s English television live news magazine show that is broadcast daily from Washington D.C., bringing information about Africa, the United States, and the world to viewers across Africa.

Africa 54 features news, interviews with newsmakers, analysts, American and African government officials and everyday citizens presenting a variety of opinions on issues affecting the African continent.

Before joining the Voice of America, Vincent Makori was an Editor and on-air talent with Germany's international broadcasting agency, Deutsche Welle in Cologne. He joined Deutsche Welle in 1998 after having worked as a reporter, News Editor, anchor and talk show host with Kenya Broadcasting Corporation television and radio. As a reporter, Vincent interviewed then president George W. Bush in 2003 and thereafter travelled with the president and the White House press corps on a five nation trip to Africa. Vincent has also interviewed a number of sitting and former African presidents including then president of Ghana, John Kufuor; Hifikepunye Pohamba of Namibia; Bingu wa Mutharika of Malawi along with prominent scholars, celebrities and experts of various fields.

== Early life and education ==
Makori was born in Kenya and grew up in the capital city of Nairobi and the coastal city of Mombasa. He earned a bachelor’s degree in English Literature from Moi University in Eldoret, Kenya, and went on to receive a postgraduate diploma in Mass Communication from the University of Nairobi. He has attended multiple professional journalism programs and has trained in Kenya, Germany, and the United States, strengthening his expertise in international reporting and media production.

== Career ==
Makori began his broadcasting career at the Kenya Broadcasting Corporation (KBC), where he worked for four years as a reporter, editor, anchor, and talk show host. At KBC, he anchored prime news and hosted two prime-time live television programs: Face to Face and the current-affairs show Mambo Leo.

In 1998, he joined Deutsche Welle in Cologne, Germany, serving as an editor, producer, and on-air broadcaster. During his tenure, he trained in Advanced Economic Reporting and Digital Audio Production, building a foundation for explaining complex global policy, business, and political issues.

Makori joined the Voice of America in 2001, moving to Washington, D.C. He advanced through multiple roles—including international broadcaster and multimedia production specialist—before being appointed Managing Editor of Television. In this role, he leads editorial strategy for VOA’s English-language TV programming, oversees newsroom operations across time zones, manages international correspondents, and spearheads VOA’s digital and visual storytelling initiatives. He has also anchored and produced major interviews and live coverage across global platforms.

As host of Straight Talk Africa, Makori guides in-depth discussions on politics, governance, business, health, and social issues impacting the African continent, featuring policymakers, experts, and civic voices.

== Notable reporting and interviews ==
- U.S. Republican and Democratic National Conventions and multiple African presidential elections.
- President George W. Bush’s five-nation tour of Africa (2003), during which he interviewed the U.S. President and traveled with the White House press corps.
- John Kerry – U.S. Sec. of State in 2014.
- The African Union Summit in Lusaka, Zambia.
- The United Nations General Assembly in New York.
- International Trade and Technology Fairs in Berlin and Hanover, Germany.
- The International AIDS Conference in Mexico City.
- The G-20 Summit in Pittsburgh, Pennsylvania.

He has also conducted exclusive interviews with numerous world leaders and public figures, including African heads of state, U.S. Secretary of State John Kerry, and world-renowned scientist and inventor Dr. Thomas Mensah, the first Black person to receive seven U.S. patents in six years.

== Leadership and contributions ==
Makori is credited with helping transform VOA’s daily TV program Africa 54, expanding its reach, digital presence, and editorial relevance. He has co-produced impactful reporting collaborations with media affiliates in Zambia, Malawi, and Zimbabwe, focusing on issues such as drought, technology, and education. Beyond broadcasting, Vincent is also a moderator, public speaker, media trainer, and mentor, supporting the development of emerging journalists across continents.

== Awards ==
Makori is a recipient of numerous awards, among them are the BBG Gold Medal Award and VOA's Superior Accomplishment Award.
