= Gatanga Constituency =

Kenyan electoral constituency

Gatanga
- constituency for the Parliament of Kenya
- Gatanga Constituency within Murang'a County

- Murang'a County within Kenya
- County: Murang'a
- Population: 187,989
- Area: 531 km^{2} (205.0 sq mi)

Current constituency
- Number of members: 1
- Party: UDA
- Member of Parliament: Edward Muriu
- Wards: 6

Gatanga Constituency is an electoral constituency in Kenya and is one of the seven constituencies in Muranga County. The constituency has six wards (Kariara, Gatanga, Kihumbu-ini, Mugumo-ini, Ithanga, Kakuzi/Mitubiri).The constituency was established for the 1988 elections when the Kandara Constituency was split into two. Gatanga Constituency consists of Gatanga and Kakuzi administrative divisions, the latter was added in 2002.

== Members of Parliament ==
Elections	MP	Party	Notes
1988	Joseph Mwaura Gachui	KANU	One-party system
1992	Josephat Mburu Wanyoike	Ford-Asili	
1997	David Wakairu Murathe	SDP	
2002	Peter Kenneth	NARC	
2007	Peter Kenneth	PNU	
2013	Humphrey Kimani Njuguna	NARC	
2017	Joseph Ngugi Nduati	Jubilee Party	
2022	Wakili Edward Muriu	United Democratic Alliance (UDA)	

== Wards ==
Ward	Registered Voters
Gatanga	16,842
Ithanga	11,310
Kakuzi/Mitubiri	15,291
Kariara	26,459
Mugumo-ini	14,252
Kihumbu-ini	17,142
Total	101,296
August 2022
