= Kiambu High School =

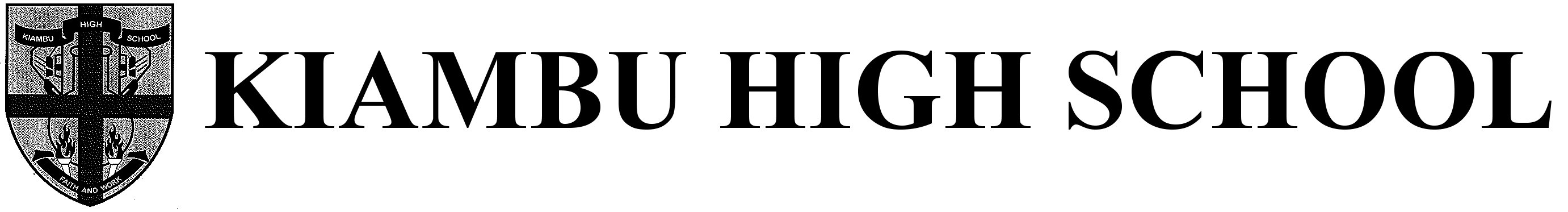

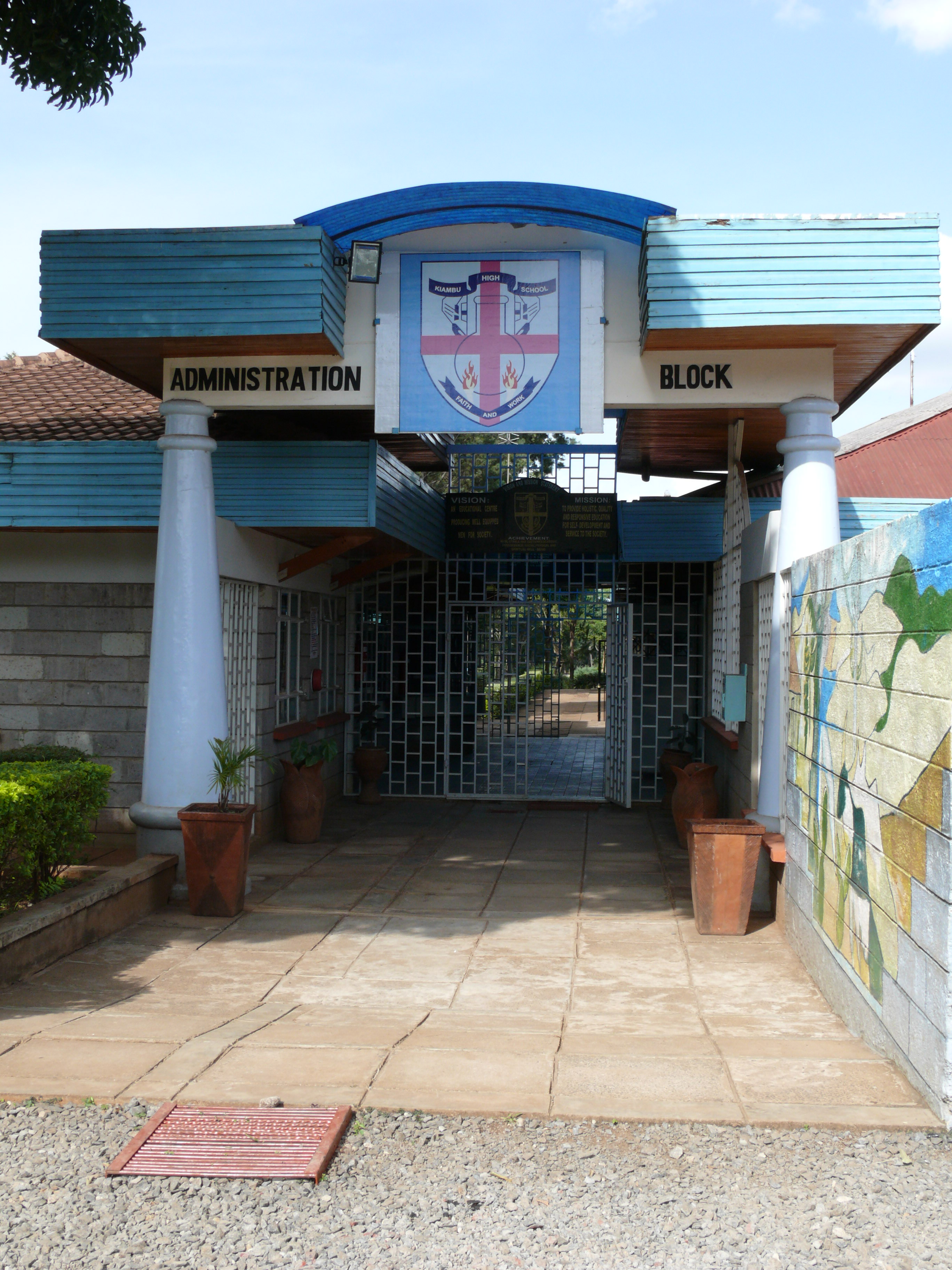
- Main entrance to the administration block
- Kiambu County; Kenya

Information
- Type: Public boarding school
- Motto: Faith and Work
- Established: 1971; 55 years ago
- Gender: Boys

Kiambu High School (KHS) is a public national/C1 boarding school for boys located in Kiambu County, Kenya. KHS is located in Kiamumbi Sub location, Kiambaa S/Area Location, Kiambaa Division, Kiambaa Constituency in Kiambu County.

== Vision and mission statements ==
The school's vision to see an education centre that produces well equipped men for the society. Its mission is to provide holistic, quality, and responsive education for self development and service to society.

== History ==
Over the years, the school has continued to registered good academic performance. The school was established in 1968 with the view to providing education to the local community. It was different from other schools in the following ways; one, while other schools were converted from intermediate schools, KHS was a secondary school from inception; two, it was free of religious affiliations and sponsorship; three, the school was designed for the open Plan system of education.

The Open Plan System of education was borrowed from Canadian compliance with the Ominde Report of 1964. This system of education was to combine education and environment and was also emphasised on skills acquisition. KHS was founded as an institution catering for environmental studies in 1976 — it had no proper curriculum. The first headmaster, Mr. John Long, was an expert in the open Plan system of education. The curriculum lasted two years and was abandoned in 1978 due to lack of requisite staff which was caused by key teachers leaving barely a year after it had started, and with that, training collapsed. Thereafter, the school shifted to offer the national curriculum like other schools.

The school is situated on a 35-acre piece of land bought in 1969 with financial support from the then Kiambu County Council. A board of Governors (BOG) was put in place with its first chairman as the late Njenga Karume who served until 1979.

The first batch of students was admitted in 1971. Since the infrastructure was incomplete, the girls were sent to Kambui Girls School and the boys to Chania High School. The buildings were constructed between 1971 and 1974 and the school opened its doors to the first residents in 1976.

It was started as a co-educational boarding school. However, due to the growing demand for boys’ school In Kiambu, it was converted to a boys’ school. Consequently, between 1990 and 1993 the girls were systematically phased out and relocated to the Mary Leakey Girls and Kijabe Girls Schools.

The school aims to leave a positive mark in the society at large.

=== Major milestones ===
The following are the major milestones of Kiambu High School since inception;

- 1968 – idea to set up a secondary for interdisciplinary curriculum based on environment
- 1969 – first BOG (now BOM) was formed
- 1971 – commenced construction of administration, tuition and boarding complexes
- 1974 – completed and commissioned the buildings
- 1976 – purchased the first school vehicle, BEDFORD. First batch of resident students (40 boys and 40 girls) admitted
- 1979 – first "O" level examinations are done
- 1991 – purchased new school bus, ISUZU
- 1993 – school converted to a boys-only after the remaining girls were relocated to two neighbouring girls schools
- 1994 – new tuition complex, "The Academic Complex" is commissioned
- 1999 – constructed the computer laboratory and the health unit
- 2003 – commissioned the new Administration block
- 2004 – constructed the sports field through reclamation of the rocky field popularly known as "the valley" by the students
- 2009 – extended the academic complex by four more classes; designated as a centre of excellence by the MOEST and MOF
- 2010 – commenced the 200-bed capacity hostel through the ESP programme
- 2011 – procured the 51-seater and 37-seater school buses
- 2012 – completed and occupied the 200-bed capacity hostel
- 2014 – drilled and equipped a new borehole; constructed and commissioned a new bakery and an ultra-modern ablution block
- 2016 – commenced construction of Academic Complex II and the swimming pool; registered the Alumni Association
- 2018 – commissioned the Academic Complex II; launched the Semi-Olympic Swimming Pool; and commenced construction of an additional dormitory
- 2019 – completion and occupying of the ground floor dormitory with a capacity of 46 double decker beds with 92 students and a captains cubicle occupied by two people.

== Student life ==
Students are divided into thirteen houses, each named after famous mountains. They wear a uniform consisting of royal blue trousers, light blue shirts, maroon sweaters and royal blue ties. The school has various clubs and societies available for the students focusing on history, law and gender, debating, journalism, science, wildlife and geography.

Sports played at the school include field hockey, soccer, handball, table tennis, badminton, volleyball, rugby, swimming and basketball.

== School principals ==
Ordinal	Name	Term start	Term end	Time in office	Notes
1	John Long	1976	1977	0–1 years	
2	W. Gichuki	1977	1978	0–1 years	
3	S. Kinuthia	1978	1979	0–1 years	
4	Cyrus G. Wahome	1979	1984	4–5 years	
5	M. Wamathai	1984	1987	2–3 years	
6	J. T Kiongo	1988	1989	0–1 years	
7	G. M. Njoroge	1989	2006	16–17 years	
8	Gitau Njoroge	2007	2015	7–8 years	
9	Solomon Mwangi	2015	2022	6–7 years	
10	Robert Mukanzi	2023	incumbent	2–3 years	

== Gallery ==
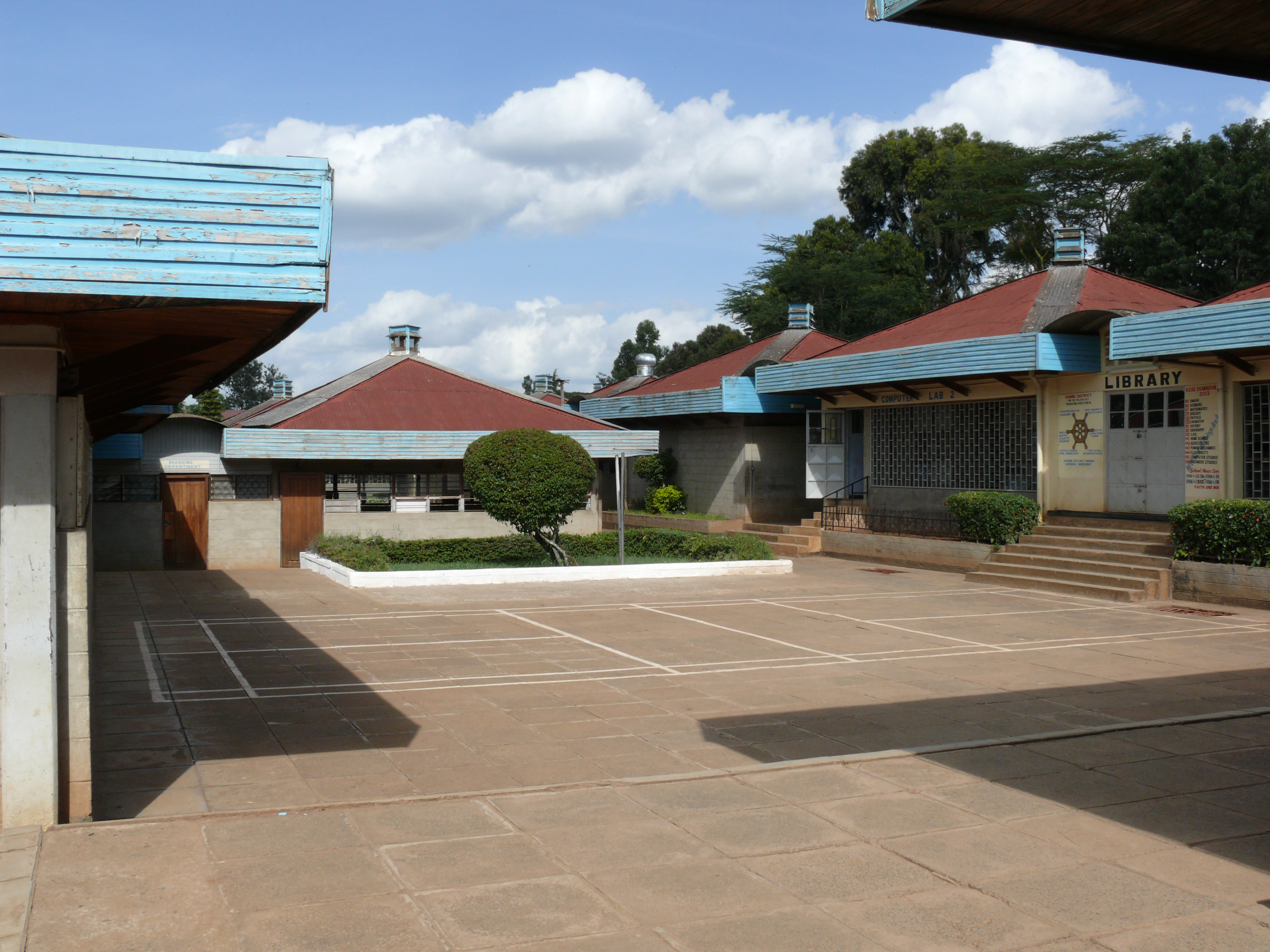
The school main square

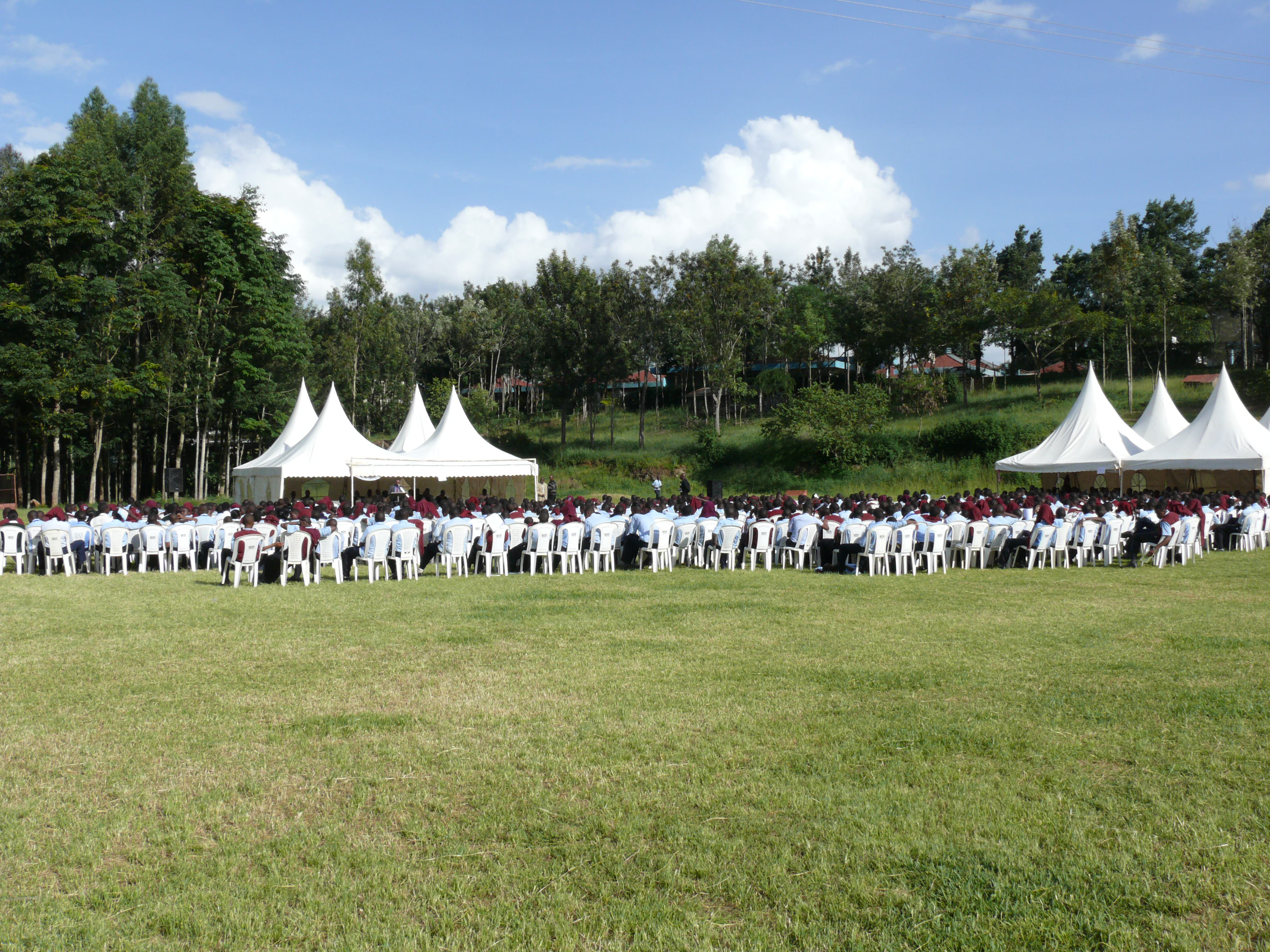
During a school function

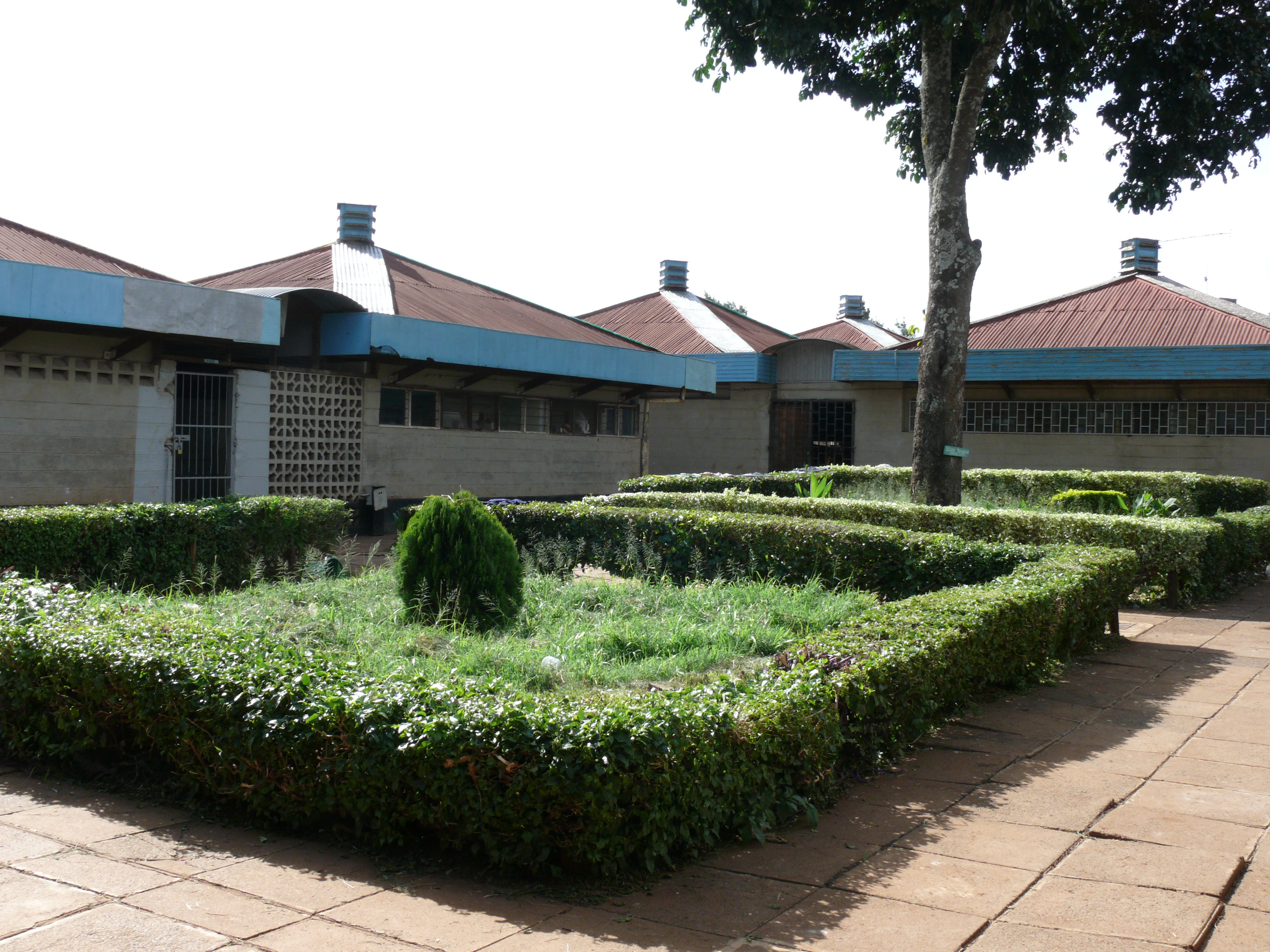
Some of the houses

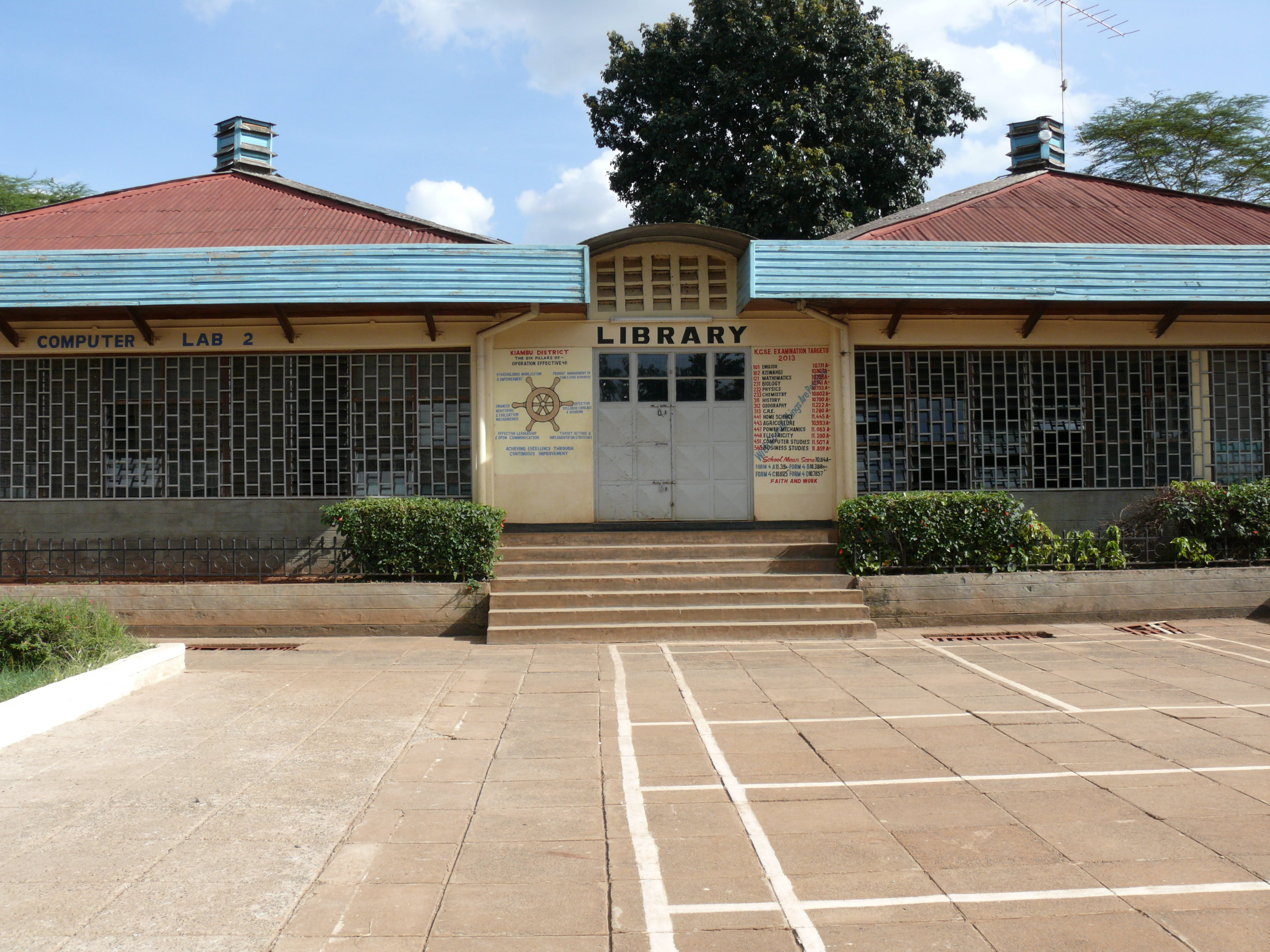
School library

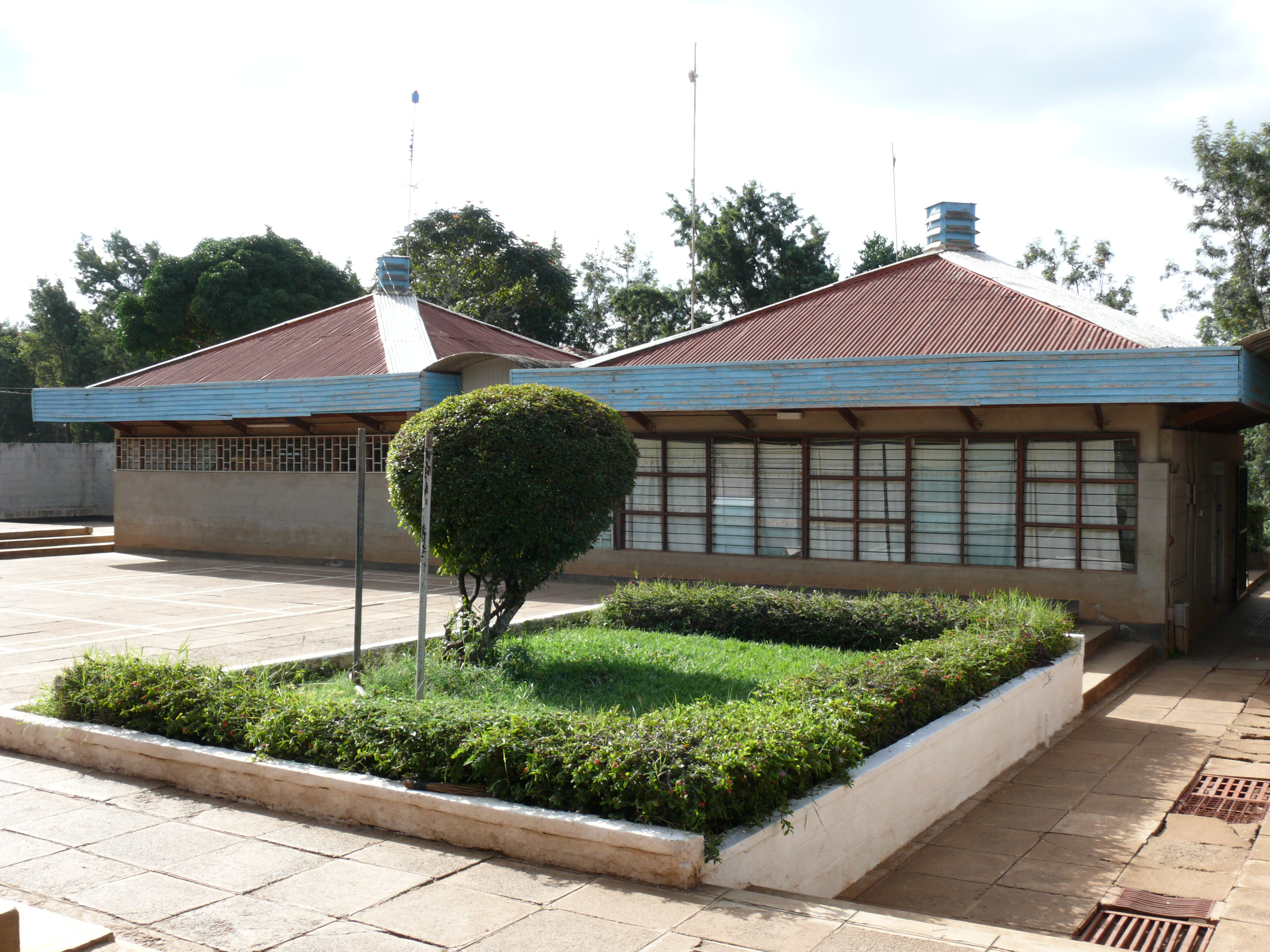
Staff room

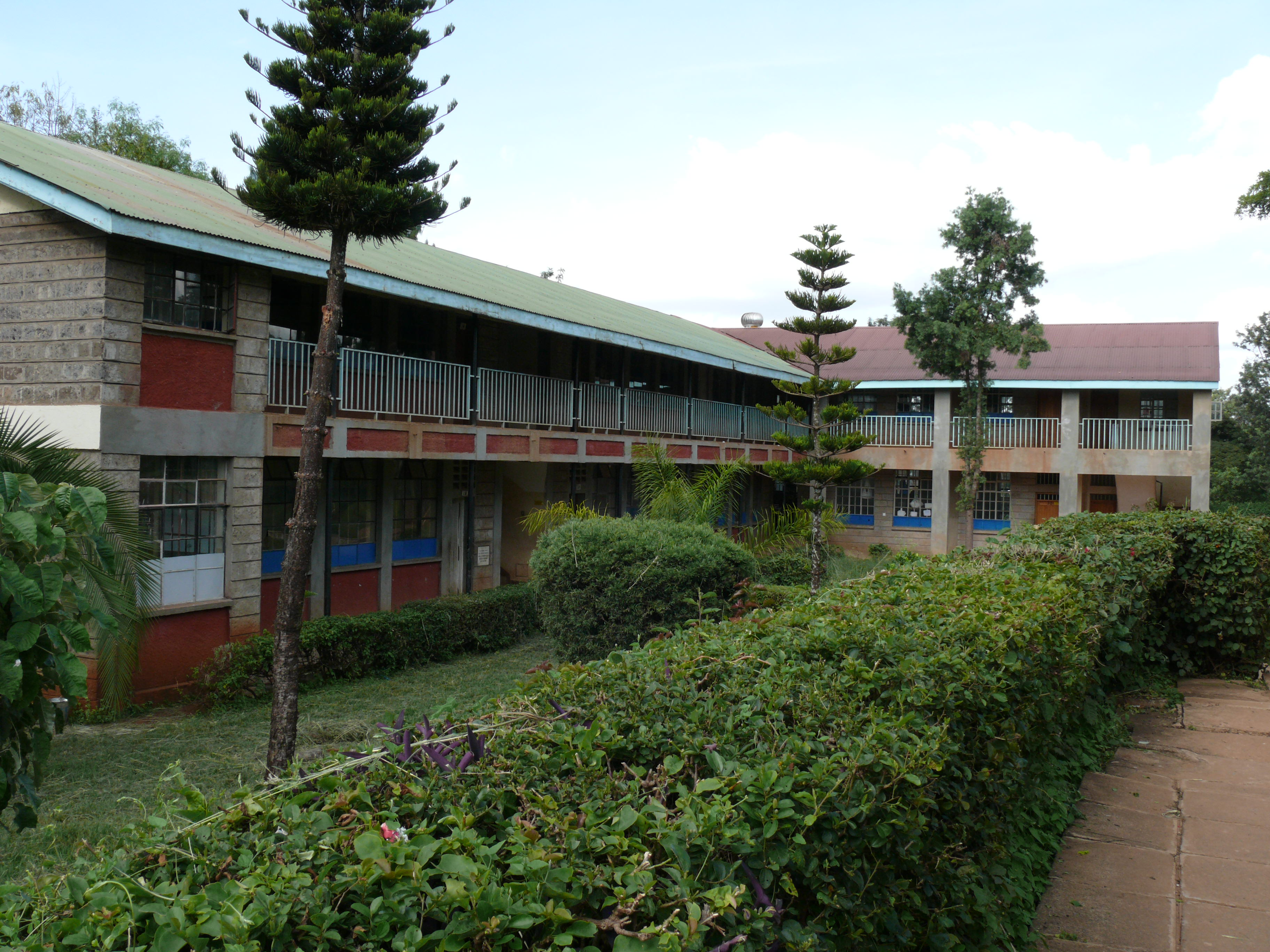
Academic complex
