= Peter Kenneth =

Kenyan politician

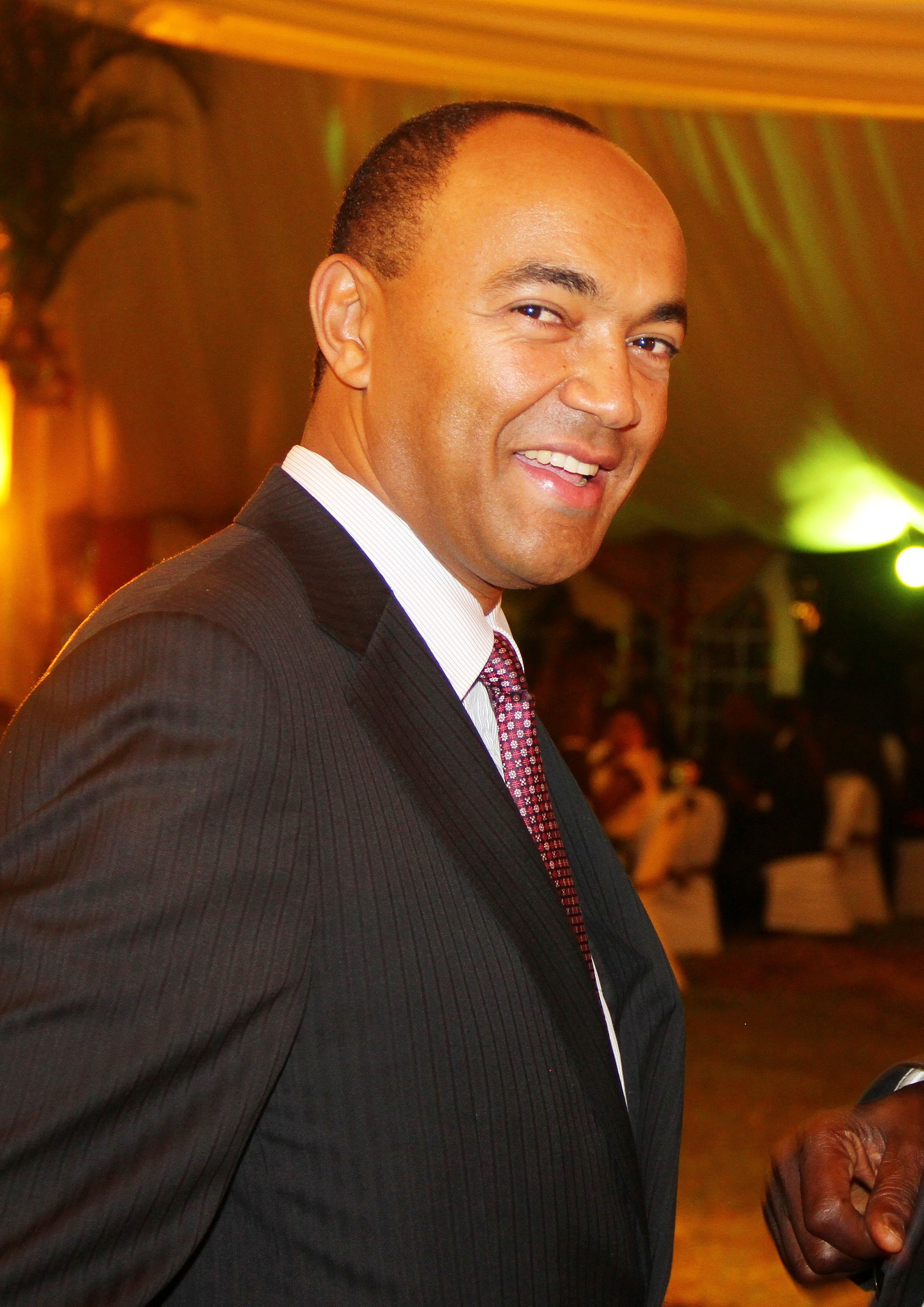

Assistant Minister of Planning and National Development and Vision 2030
- In office 2008–2013
- Minister: Wycliffe Oparanya

Assistant Minister of Finance
- In office 2005–2007

Assistant Minister of Cooperative Development and Marketing
- In office 2003–2005

Member of the Kenyan Parliament
- In office 2002–2013
- Constituency: Gatanga Constituency

Personal details
- Born: 27 November 1965 (age 60) Bahati, Nairobi, Kenya
- Party: KNC
- Spouse: Ann Kenneth
- Children: Andrew Kenneth; Andrea Kenneth
- Education: University of Nairobi(LL.M); University of Nairobi(LL.B); IMD (Exec. Ed)
- Occupation: Banker
- Positions: Chairman, Kenya Football Federation (1996 – 2000)
- Website: www.peterkenneth.com

Peter Kenneth (born 27 November 1965) is a Kenyan politician. He hails from Kirwara Sub-location of Gatanga Constituency in Murang'a County, Kenya.

== Early life and career ==
Peter Kenneth attended Bahati Uhuru Primary School (CPE) and later joined Starehe Boys' Centre and School for his 'O' and 'A' levels. He is a holder of a Masters in Law degree from the University of Nairobi, and Executive Programme International Institute for Management Development in Lausanne, Switzerland. He has also done numerous banking and Insurance courses.

After graduating as a banker by profession, he has worked for the following institutions:

Nationwide Finance company	In 1985 he worked at the Nationwide Finance company up to 1986.
Prudential Finance and Bank	Kenneth later worked at prudential Finance and bank for 11 years starting in 1986 until 1997. During his stay there he rose to the position of Manager.
Kenya Football Federation	He was elected the chairman of the Kenya Football Federation in 1996, a position he served until the year 2000.
Kenya Reinsurance Corporation	In 1997 he joined the Kenya Reinsurance company as MD and he worked there until 2002.
Africa Reinsurance Corporation	Alt. Director, 1998 – 2001
Industrial Development Bank	Director, 1998 – 2002
Zep Reinsurance Company	Chairman, 1998 – 2009

== Political life ==
Peter Kenneth was first elected a Member of Parliament for Gatanga Constituency in December 2002 on a National rainbow coalition ticket. He held this seat up to 2013 general elections where he vied for presidency. His constituency was voted the best managed in Kenya, during his tenure.

Started January 2013: Member of Kenya National Congress

Started 2012: Coalition Member of The Eagle Coalition

Started January 2013: party leader of Kenya National Congress

2011- 4 March 2013: Aspirant President of Kenya

2008 – 2012: Member of Parliament for Gatanga

2007 – 14 January 2013: Member of Party of National Unity

2008 to 2012: Assistant Minister, Ministry of State for Planning, National Development and Vision 2030.

Dec 2005–2007: Member of National Rainbow Coalition

2003 – 2007: Member of Parliament for Gatanga

Nov 2003–2005: Assistant Minister of Finance – Monetary, Fiscal & Investment Affairsof Cabinet

=== 2002 – 2012 ===
Under the leadership of Peter Kenneth, Gatanga was declared the constituency which had best utilized its Constituency Development Fund money for the financial year of 2011/2012.

== 2013 Presidential bid ==
He was the first presidential aspirant to release his manifesto for the 2013 Kenyan general election. During the launch, he said he would vie on a Kenya National Congress party ticket. The thirteen key areas that he promised to address if elected for the president of Kenya were: i) National security, ii) food security, iii) employment infrastructure, iv) health care, v) education, vi) tourism, vii) slum upgrade, viii) water, ix) agriculture, x) diaspora, xi) environment and xii) manufacturing.

He was the first Kenyan presidential aspirant with no African name. His constituents have in the past called him muthungu (a white man in Kikuyu language) for the reason that if he calls for a meeting to start at 7am, it will start precisely at 7am and not later.

He formed a working coalition with Hon. Raphael Tuju of Party of Action and reached out to like-minded presidential aspirants to take on the leading coalitions of CORD and Jubilee. This coalition was expected to be the third force in the elections and provide an alternative for the electorate. He eventually settled on Ronald Osumba as his running mate.

He indicated that most of his KSh.300 million/= (about US$3.4 million) campaign financing came from small contributors – the largest single donation standing at KSh.1 million/= (about US$11,400).

== Interests and hobbies ==
He has interests in farming, insurance, real estate and manufacturing. He also has a lot of interest in sports, having been the chairman of Kenya Football Federation from 1996 to 2000, and FIFA Committee Member (FUTSAL) from 1998 to 2000. Kenneth was a goalkeeper when he was still in school and he even went on to play for former Kenya Premier League side Reunion FC. He's also associated with Mayfair Bank, in Kenya.

== See also ==
- Gatanga Constituency
