= Kenya National Congress =

Political party in Kenya

- Leader: Manson Nyamweya
- Secretary-General: Benjamin Gisore
- Women Leader: Lillian Anyango
- Youth Leader: Enock Onkoba
- Secretary for Information: Alfred Asande Ongoro
- Founder: Maina Wanjigi; Kenneth Matiba; Titus Mbathi; Charles Rubia
- Founded: 1991
- Headquarters: Mbabane Road Lavington, Plot No. 3731/55, Nairobi
- Ideology: Human rights Social justice Democracy
- National affiliation: Eagle Alliance

Website
- www.kncparty.or.ke

Kenya National Congress (KNC) is a Kenyan political party founded in 1991 during the early days of the return of Multiparty Democracy as a result of a split in FORD-Asili. It has consistently fielded candidates in general elections since 1992 at Parliamentary and Local Authority levels. The party sponsored Gatanga Member of Parliament Peter Kenneth, who launched his presidential bid on the party ticket, as well as an alliance between him and Raphael Tuju of the Party of Action The stated vision of KNC, as according to its official web site, is to see Kenya as a proud and prosperous nation that takes care of all her citizens and where hope and self-confidence thrives among all Kenyans both at home and abroad.

== The Party Mission ==
The stated Mission of KNC is to provide a people driven Government that is participatory, and consultative, building a free market economy driven by the people; ensuring a more equitable distribution of income and wealth within a secure environment for all.

== Party Philosophy ==
Kenya National Congress' philosophy is to foster unity and unlock Kenya's potential for a better and a brighter Kenya, guided by good governance under a stable and people-driven Government that is development- oriented, transparent, peaceful and corruption-free. In keeping with this philosophy, KNC stands FOR:

- Upholding democratic principles and institutionalisation of democracy in Kenya. KNC stands for a democratic society wedded to equity and social justice and committed to the preservation of the unity and integrity of our country. KNC looks at democracy as a holistic outcome of ensuring equal rights to each and everyone in the country, politically, economically and socially. KNC shall ensure equal opportunity for all in all spheres of life, especially education and skill development with special affirmative action for the deprived sections of the society.
- Ensuring the unity and integrity of Kenya by strengthening a decentralised Government for Kenya and upholding the rule of law without any prejudice to any region, race, tribe, sex or status.
- Building an economically progressive nation based on the free-market economy where private enterprise is encouraged and direct Government participation in business is minimised.
- Fostering a vibrant and dynamic society based on pluralism and diversity; to replace elitism with free competition; to provide an equal opportunity for all Kenyans especially in the area of education; and to encourage policies that create equal opportunities for all including women, youth and disabled people
- Encouraging and empowering Kenyans to participate in the Nation's political process; to respect human, civil and political rights of all Kenyans; to achieve a free flow of information in society

== Core values ==
KNC's stated beliefs are that:

- Reconciliatory, honest and participatory politics is essential for the self-sustaining democracy
- The primary reason for the existence of the Government and leaders is to serve the citizens
- Safeguarding human rights is the responsibility of the Government
- Provision of security for people and their property is the prime responsibility of the Government
- Provision of basic needs for all is a human right
- Justice must be administered efficiently, effectively and without favour
- Freedom of ideas, speech and association are essential components of democracy for sustainable good governance

== Notable members ==
- Manson Oyongo Nyamweya
- John Imoite
- Onesmus Kioko
