= Kenya School of Government =

Kenya School of Public Administration

The Kenya School of Government (KSG) is a Kenyan public service institution established by the KSG Act (No. 9 of 2012) to build capacity of the Public Service leadership by developing managerial and leadership competencies for a quality public service.

== History ==
The Kenya School of Government was originally established in 1961 as a Public Service Management and Development Institute. In 1963, it was renamed to Kenya Institute of Administration (KIA) with an aim of training and educating Kenya's post-independence high cadre civil service and government administrative leaders. The Kenya School of Government is located in Lower Kabete Road

=== Reforms Under Vision 2030 ===
To align the institution to the Kenya Vision 2030 requirements for public sector reforms in order to guarantee quality service delivery to citizens of Kenya, the Kenya School of Government Act No.9 of 2012 was passed in Kenya's parliament in year 2012 to transform the institute with a new mandate to build knowledge, competencies and skills in the public service through Training, Research and Public policy advisory services that meets the needs of the public servants at all levels in the employment hierarchy.

== Academics ==
Kenya School of Government offers consultancy, training, research and advisory services to government, non government and private organizations in the areas of public policy development and management.

=== Diplomas ===
The institution offers Diploma in Public Financial Management, Diploma in Public Administration, Diploma in Management of Public Enterprise among others.
