= Moi University =

Public university in Kesses, Kenya

- Motto: Foundation of knowledge
- Type: Public University
- Established: 1984; 42 years ago
- Founders: Daniel arap Moi
- Budget: 6.93 Billion KSH
- Chancellor: Dankit Nassiuma
- Vice-Chancellor: Issac Sanga Kosgey
- Students: 52,815
- Undergraduates: 47,458
- Postgraduates: 5,357
- Location: Kesses, Uasin Gishu County, Kenya; 0°17′00″N 35°17′40″E
- Campus: 3,000 acres (1,200 ha); Rural
- Colors: Green, red, white
- Mascot: The Nandi Bear
- Website: www.mu.ac.ke

Moi University is a public university located in Kesses, Eldoret town, Uasin Gishu county, in the former Rift Valley Province of Kenya. It was established in 1984 by the Moi University Act of the Parliament of Kenya, after recommendations from the McKay Commission.

== History ==
Moi University was first established in 1984. In its first year of existence, there was only one department - the Department of Forestry. The enrollment that year was 83.

The university's school of medicine was established in 1996, and was the second school of medicine established in the country.

The university's first VC was Professor D. Odhiambo, who served from 1984 to 1988.

The current chancellor of the university is Prof. Dankit Nassiuma while the vice-chancellor is Isaac Sanga Kosgey.

=== MU in the 21st century ===
Most of the university's campuses became fully fledged universities in the early 2010s.

The Garissa University College attack of 2015 occurred at the university's Garissa campus. In this incident, 5 gunmen claiming association with Al-Shabaab took over 700 students hostage, freeing those identified as Muslim, and killing 142 identified as Christians, with over 79 others injured in the attack plus 6 military and police fatalities. The siege was lifted the same day, with 4 of the attackers killed by the Kenyan GSU and one committing suicide via an explosive vest.

From its founding, the university had no officially recognised mascot. However, in early 2017, students from the School of Engineering chose the Nandi bear to be their mascot and, pending consensus from other Schools, the university's mascot. It was chosen for its legendary status among the Nandi people (the university was founded in Kesses, which was predominantly settled by the Nandi) and was given a temporary name - "Kerit the Bear".

== Schools ==
The university emphasizes science and technology. It has the following schools:

- School of Agriculture and Natural Resources;
- School of Aerospace Science;
- School of Arts and Social Sciences;
- School of Biological and Physical Sciences;
- School of Business and Economics;
- School of Education;
- School of Engineering;
- College of Health Sciences;
  1. School of Dentistry;
  2. School of Medicine;
  3. School of Nursing;
  4. School of Public Health;
- School of Information Sciences;
- School of Law;
- School of Tourism Hospitality and Events Management;
- School of Graduate Studies

=== Institutes ===
- Institute for Gender Equity, Research and Development;
- Peace and Reconciliation Institute;
- Institute of Biomedical Informatics;
- Institute of Open & Distance Learning;
- Confucius Institute

== Campuses ==
- Main Campus [Eldoret]
- Town Campus, including:
  - College of Health Sciences Medical Complex
  - School of Aerospace Sciences (Rivatex)
  - School of Law (Annex)
- Nairobi campus
- Coast campus (Pwani)

== Constituent colleges ==
- Garissa University College

=== Satellite campuses ===
- College of Health Sciences
- Annex Town Campus
- West Campus
- Mombasa Campus
- Nairobi Campus

== Traditions ==
=== Graduation ===
Graduation ceremonies are held each year at the Graduation Pavilion.

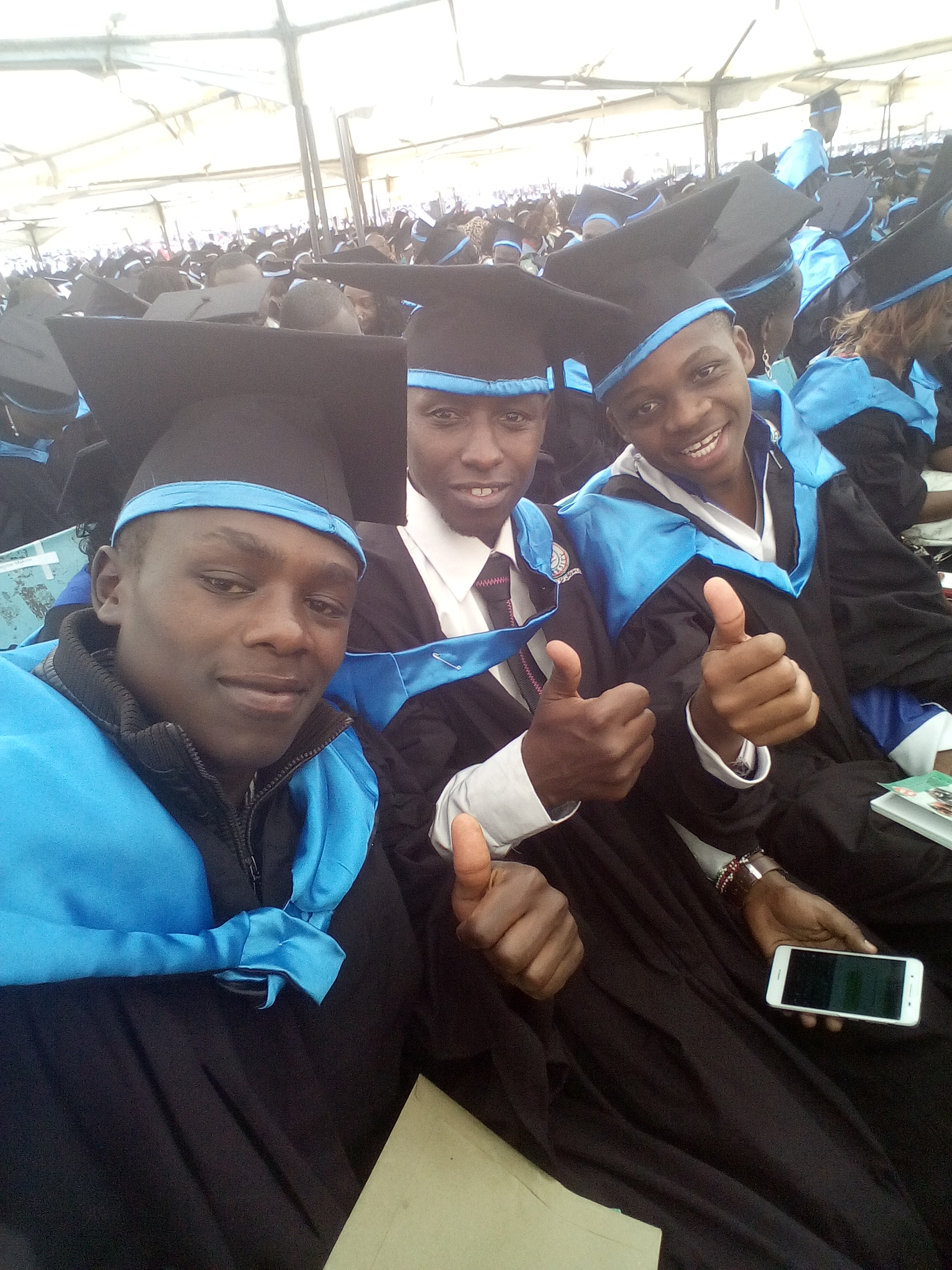
Moi University Graduation, Kenya

=== Kesses Dam ===
Boat rides in Kesses Dam are popular among students. Dating students, student clubs as well as individuals can enjoy a boat ride at the dam offered by local dam guides at a small fee.

== Student life ==
=== Social ===
A nearby shopping centre called "Stage" supplies most of the students' economic needs. There can be found minimarts, nightclubs, convenience stores and other economic activities here. The origin of the name is from the time when the area was a stop for matatus that plied the Kesses-Eldoret Town route.

Religious services are available at the Moi University Seventh-Day Adventist Church (MUSDA, LT3/LT4), Grace Chapel ('GC', Protestant), Lecture Hall 1 (Christian Union) and at St. Michael's Chapel (Catholic).

=== Clubs and societies ===
Some of the newspapers/publications are The 3rd Eye, "Legacy", "AIESEC" among others. There are numerous societies for student engagement, such as Enactus, etc. The student radio station is 103.9MUFM.

=== Student body ===
The Moi University Students Organisation (MUSO) serves the student community in the pursuit of academic and social welfare. Elections are held at the end of every academic year (October/November.

== Notable alumni ==
=== Engineering ===
- Mugo Kibati (1991)

=== Literature, poetry ===
- Mildred Barya

=== Law ===
- Ronald Osumba

=== Sport ===
- David Kenga

=== Economics ===
- Nduku Kilonzo

=== Journalism ===
- Vincent Makori
- Dorcas Wangira

=== Theology/Religious studies ===
- Hazel Ong'ayo Ayanga
- Eunice Wanjiku Kamaara

=== Politics ===
- Fatuma Achani Governor of Kwale County
- Aden Duale
- Peter Kagwanja
- James Ole Kiyiapi
- Mwangi Kiunjuri (1994)
- Joshua Kutuny (2006)
- Abbas Abdullahi Sheikh Siraji

== See also ==
- Egerton University
- Kenyan Colleges and Universities
- Education in Kenya
- List of universities in Kenya
