= Gedi =

Gedi or GEDI may refer to:

== People ==
- Ali Mohamed Gedi (born 1952), Prime Minister of Somalia, 2004–2007
- Bashir Nur Gedi (died 2007), Somali dissident journalist who was murdered
- Ahmed Jimale Gedi, Somali Chief of Defence Force, 2010–2011
- Mohamed Omar Gedi, Somali vice minister in the Cabinet of Somalia
- Gedi Sibony, American artist who exhibited in the 2006 Whitney Biennial
- Gedi Ugas Madhar, Somalian leader of a faction of the Somali Patriotic Movement
- Gedi, a subtribe of the Daizangi (Hazara tribe) in Afghanistan

== Places ==
- Gedi, Saurashtra, a village on the Saurashtra Peninsula, Gujarat, India
- Gedi State, a former princely state with seat in the above town
- Gedi, Kutch, a village in Kutch district, Gujarat, India
- Gedi, Kenya, a town in Kilifi County, Kenya
  - Gedi Ruins, a historical and archaeological site adjacent to the town
- Gedi Township, in Yonghe County, Linfen, Shanxi Province, China
- Gedi, a rural village in Changshan County, Quzhou, Zhejiang Province, China

== Other ==
- GEDI, Global Ecosystem Dynamics Investigation, a NASA mission to measure the world's forests
- Gedi (mythology), a Fijian god
- Global Entrepreneurship and Development Institute (GEDI), compiler of the Global Entrepreneurship Index
- GEDI Gruppo Editoriale, an Italian media conglomerate

== See also ==
- Gedi & Sons FC, a Liberian football club
- Gede (disambiguation)
- Ein Gedi (disambiguation)
