= Malindi Constituency =

Electoral district of Kenya

Malindi
- constituency for the Parliament of Kenya
- Malindi Constituency within Kilifi County

- Kilifi County within Kenya
- County: Kilifi
- Population: 333,226
- Area: 2,263 km^{2} (873.7 sq mi)

Current constituency
- Number of members: 1
- Party: ODM
- Member of Parliament: Amina Laura Mnyazi
- Wards: 5

Malindi Constituency is an electoral constituency in Kilifi County, Kenya. It is one of seven constituencies in the county and was one of two constituencies in the now defunct Malindi District.

== Members of Parliament ==
Elections	MP	Party	Notes
1963	Francis Bobi Tuva	KADU	
1969	Francis Bobi Tuva	KANU	One-party system
1974	Francis Bobi Tuva	KANU	One-party system
1979	Francis Bobi Tuva	KANU	One-party system
1983	Francis Bobi Tuva	KANU	One-party system
1988	Francis Bobi Tuva	KANU	One-party system
1992	Abubakar Mohamed Badawy	KANU	
1997	Abubakar Mohamed Badawy	KANU	
2002	Lucas B. Mweni Maitha	NARC	
2007	Gideon Mung'aro	ODM	
2017	Aisha Jumwa	ODM	
2022	Amina Laura Mnyazi	ODM	

== Locations and wards ==
Locations
Location	Population*
Chakama	6,586
Ganda	16,161
Gede	26,805
Goshi	16,823
Jilore	9,832
Langobaya	14,513
Malindi	102,411
Watamu	21,034
Total	x
1999 census.

Wards
Ward	Registered Voters	Local Authority
Barani	7,199	Malindi Municipality
Ganda / Mkaumoto	4,970	Malindi Municipality
Gede	7,440	Malindi Municipality
Kijiwetanga	4,161	Malindi Municipality
Madunguni	3,194	Malindi Municipality
Malimo	1,398	Malindi Municipality
Malindi Central	6,927	Malindi Municipality
Malindi North	3,362	Malindi Municipality
Malindi South	10,162	Malindi Municipality
Watamu	6,741	Malindi Municipality
Chakama	1,626	Malindi County Council
Jilore	2,865	Malindi County Council
Lango Mbaya	3,809	Malindi County Council
Total	63,854	
*September 2005.
