= Malindi District =

Former administrative district in the Coast Province of Kenya

Coordinates: 3.05°S 39.9333°E

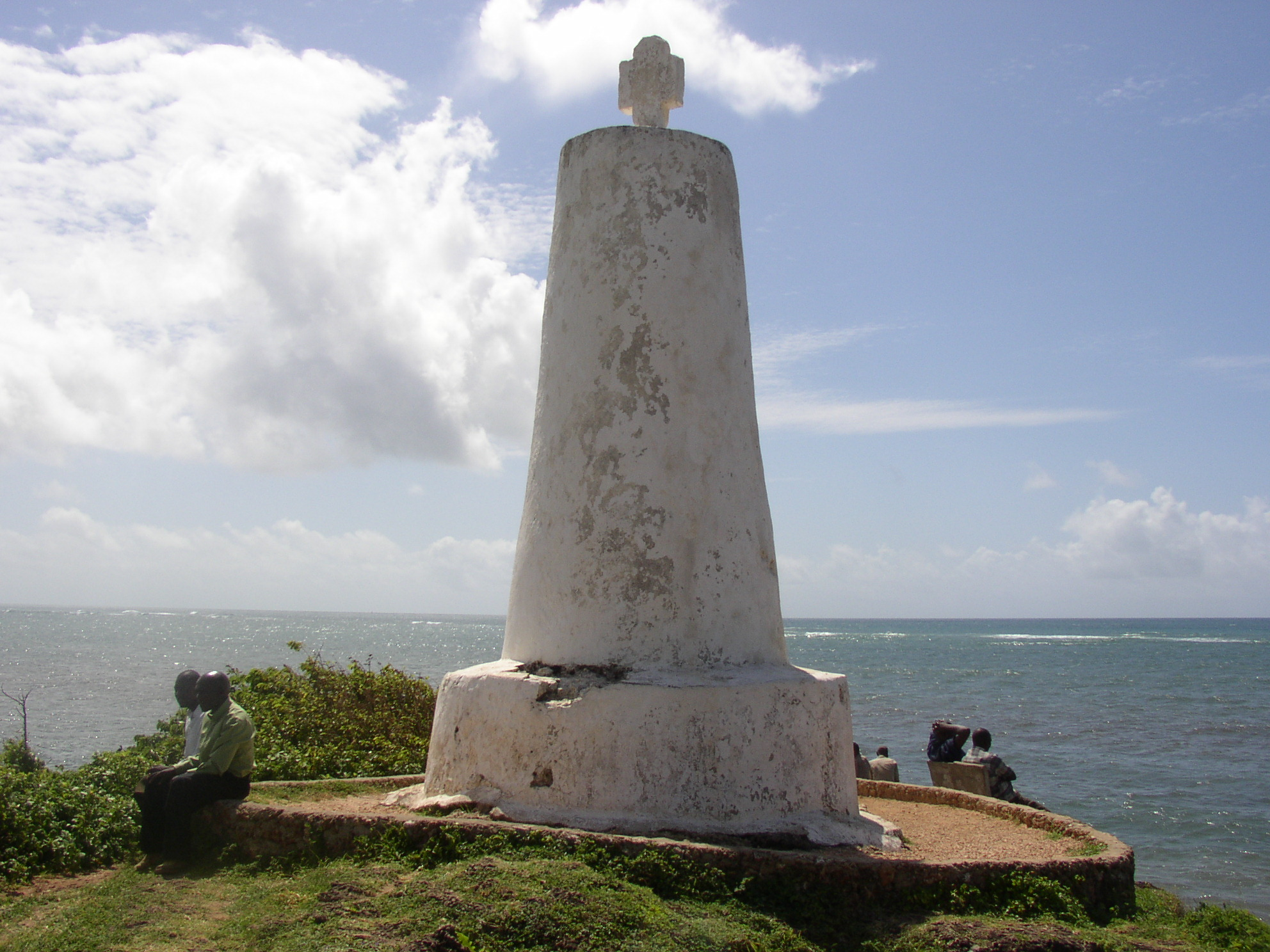
Vasco da Gama Pillar, Malindi

Malindi District was a former administrative district in the Coast Province of Kenya. Its capital was the coastal town of Malindi. When it was merged with Kilifi district to form Kilifi County in 2010, the district had a population of 544,303. Malindi Town is increasingly becoming known as Kenya’s "Little Italy". Italians own more than 2,500 properties, and the number of Italian residents in Malindi town and its environs, estimated at over 3,000, is the largest European population compared to other European populations elsewhere in the country.

== Overview ==
The Italian embassy is the only foreign mission with a resident consul in Malindi to aid its population. In the preelections held in November 2007 for the Kenyan general election, 2007 Mr. Amason Jeffah Kingi, an Advocate of the High Court, was elected as a Member of Parliament for the Magarini Parliamentary constituency and Mr. Gideon Mung'aro, the former Mayor of Malindi, was elected as a member of Parliament for the Malindi constituency. Mr. Amason Kingi was consequently appointed to the cabinet where he served as the Minister for East African Community. Tourism is a major industry while inland areas are rural.

== Subdivision ==
Local authorities (councils)
Authority	Type	Population*	Urban pop.*
Malindi	Municipality	117,735	53,805
Malindi county	County	163,817	3,854
Total	-	281,552	57,659
* 1999 census. Source:

Administrative divisions
Division	Population*	Urban pop.*	Headquarters
Magarini	68,603	3,508	
Malindi	168,806	51,100	Malindi
Marafa	44,142	0	Marafa
Tsavo East N.P.	0	0	
Total	281,552	54,608	-
* 1999 census. Sources: , ,

Villages of Watamu and Gedi are part of the Malindi division.

== Electoral constituencies ==
The district had two constituencies:

- Malindi Constituency
- Magarini Constituency
