= Salid Mustafa =

Kenyan journalist and politician

Salid Idd Mustafa (11 May 1970 in Kilifi – November 2020) was a Kenyan broadcast journalist and politician who was a member of the 11th Kenyan parliament elected from Kilifi South Constituency on the ticket of Orange Democratic Movement (ODM). He died in 2020 from suspected COVID-19 complications.

== Career ==
Salid Mustafa was a broadcast journalist and worked with KBC and later at NTV as sports presenter. He is the founder of Chancery media Consultants. He was elected to the 11th parliament for the Kilifi South Constituency seat in the Kenya National Assembly on the ticket of ODM in the 2013 elections. Mustafa scored 7,305 votes to defeat 16 other candidates including a former Bahari MP Benedict Fondo Gunda. He was noted for his development of education and resolution of long standing conflict between two tribes of Chonyi and Kauma dating to 1990s.

== Death ==
He died in November 2020 from suspected COVID-19 complications.
