= Aisha Jumwa =

Kenyan politician

Aisha Jumwa Karisa Katana

Personal details
- Born: 28 March 1975 (age 51) Kenya
- Citizenship: Kenyan
- Education: International Leadership University [ILU]
- Occupation: Member of Parliament representing in Malindi Constituency

Aisha Jumwa Karisa Katana (born 28 March 1975) is the immediate former Cabinet Secretary for Gender, fired by President William Ruto on 11 July 2024. She previously served as a Member of Parliament representing Malindi Constituency in Kilifi County and Commissioner of the Parliamentary Service Commission (PSC) from 2017 to 2022. She also served as the Woman Representative for Kilifi County from 2013 to 2017, and as Councillor for Takaungu Ward from 1997 to 2007. She holds a Bachelor's Degree in Leadership and Management from International Leadership University [ILU] and Executive Diploma in Governance from the Jomo Kenyatta University of Agriculture and Technology.

== Early life and education ==
Aisha Jumwa was born in Takaungu village, Kilifi County on 28 March 1975 to Karisa Katana and Sidi Kazungu. Her father had six wives and 28 children. She attended Takaungu Primary School, then proceeded to Ganze Secondary School where she dropped out in Form Two due to lack of school fees.

After dropping out of school, she was married off as a young girl but her marriage did not last long. When she developed an ambition to pursue a career in politics, her husband opposed her. Due to this disagreement, the two separated. When she refused to be a housewife, differences with her estranged husband became irreconcilable. It is said that Jumwa personally herded the dowry cows and goats, which had been paid to her parents, back to her in-laws in accordance with Mijikenda customary laws, ending their marriage.

Hoping for an education, Jumwa enrolled as a private student at Chandaria Hall in Mombasa where she completed her Kenya Certificate of Secondary Education examination in 2011. She followed that with a Certificate in Governance at Jomo Kenyatta University of Agriculture and Technology in 2012, and later an Executive Diploma from the same institution. After obtaining her diploma, she enrolled for a degree course at International Leadership University and graduated with a Bachelor's Degree in Leadership and Management in 2020.

== Political career ==
Aisha Jumwa’s political journey started when she was still a youth. She established the Aisha Jumwa Foundation before joining active politics. In the year 1997, at the age of 22 years, and at the behest of her father, she ran to become a Counselor for Takaungu Ward of the Kilifi County Council. She won a landslide victory. As an elected Councilor, she advocated for the youth, women, and persons living with disabilities. She recaptured her seat in the subsequent election of 2002. Jumwa also became the Chairperson of the Kilifi County Council. In 2007, she vied to represent Bahari Constituency in parliament under the ruling Kenya African National Union party but lost to her main rival, Benedict Gunda of the National Rainbow Coalition. This was her redefining moment in politics, following gruesome campaigns against male competitors, at a time politics was basically a male dominated affair.

In August 2010, Kenya promulgated a new constitution which created the position of County Woman Representative. She saw this as an opportunity to make the voice of women and other disadvantaged groups heard in the National Assembly. In the election of 2013, Jumwa ran under the banner of the Orange Democratic Movement (ODM), led by Raila Odinga, and became the first woman representative for Kilifi County. She was later elected as MP for Malindi Constituency in 2017, also as a member of ODM. In the 2019–2020 financial year, Jumwa was ranked 116th of 290 by Infotrak research firm with an approval rating of 53.3 percent countrywide. In 2021, Mizani African ranked Jumwa first in Kilifi County and second in the coastal region after her Mvita counterpart Abdulswamad Nassir. She was ranked 28th out of 290 MPs nationally.

== Defection ==
On 9 March 2018, President Uhuru Kenyatta surprised the nation by entering into a deal with his erstwhile political nemesis, Odinga, in an event famously known as the handshake. This not only changed the trajectory of political history in Kenya, but also marked the beginning of unprecedented realignments. Citing discrimination and lack of internal consultation by Odinga, Jumwa was among the political leaders who shifted their political allegiances. Immediately, she courted Deputy President William Ruto after leaving Odinga's camp. Aisha still holds the opinion that the handshake truce only served to benefit Odinga's personal interests while sidelining the people who stood with him in his failed election bids.

Attempts by ODM to officially eject her from the party and trigger a by-election were thwarted by the Political Party Dispute Tribunal. ODM had accused Jumwa of advancing the interests of another party, despite the fact that she was still a member of ODM. The Political Parties Dispute Tribunal declared the proceedings, and decision by ODM to expel Jumwa, invalid. In 2022, she officially left ODM and joined the United Democratic Alliance (UDA), led by Ruto. She has since been a key player of UDA in the coastal region, where the party has gained popularity in a previously ODM-dominated area.

== Gubernatorial bid ==
Immediately after joining the United Democratic Alliance (UDA) whose party leader is William Ruto, Jumwa declared her interest in becoming the governor of Kilifi County to succeed Amason Jeffah Kingi. She lost to Gideon Mung'aro. As expected by many Kenyans, President Ruto named Jumwa the Cabinet Secretary for Public Service, Affirmative Action, and Gender Mainstreaming, a powerful ministry that oversees the public service and institutions under it. The ministry was later split into two. Jumwa served as the Cabinet Secretary for Gender, Culture, the Arts and Heritage She was dismissed from the cabinet on 11 July 2024.
