= Gede =

Gede may refer to the following places:

- Gede, Kenya
- Gede, Nadia, West Bengal, India
  - Gede railway station
- Mount Gede, in Indonesia

Gede may also refer to:

- Gede (Haitian Vodou), the family of spirits (lwa) that embody death and fertility

== See also ==
- Gedi (disambiguation)
