= Kiamba =

Kiamba may refer to:

- Kiamba, Queensland, Australia
- Kiamba, Sarangani, Philippines
- Suzanne Ndunge Kiamba, Kenyan politician
