= Gertrude Mwanyanje =

Kenyan politician

Gertrude Mbeyu Mwanyanje
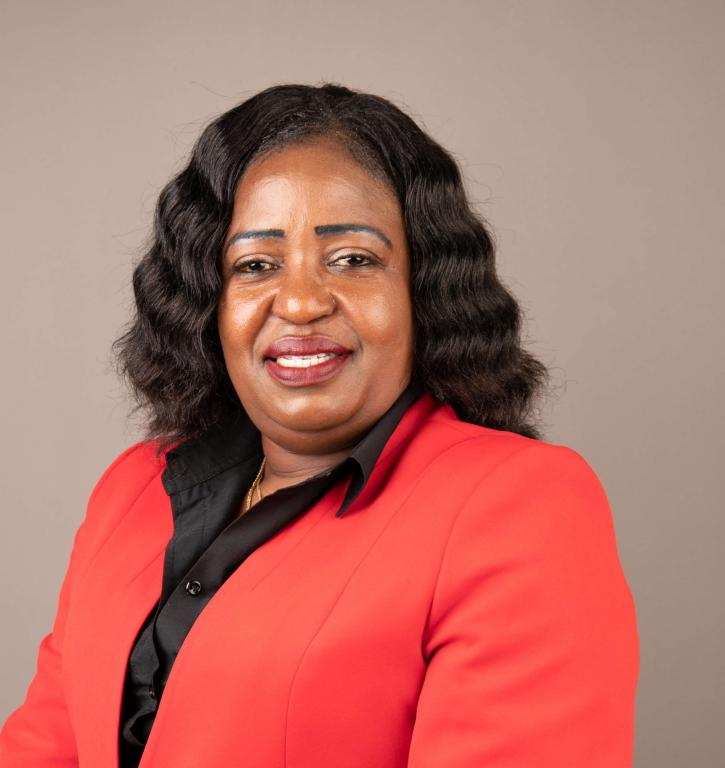

Woman Representative for Kilifi County
- Incumbent
- Assumed office 31 August 2017
- Preceded by: Aisha Jumwa

Personal details
- Born: Kenya
- Party: Orange Democratic Movement
- Occupation: Politician, teacher

Gertrude Mbeyu Mwanyanje, CBS is a Kenyan politician who is currently a member of the Kenya National Assembly as the woman representative for Kilifi. She is a member of the Orange Democratic Movement. Before entering politics, she worked in education as a teacher and college trainer. She served in the Kilifi county assembly from 2013 to 2017.
