= Agnes Pareyio =

Maasai Kenyan women's rights activist and politician

- Born: 24 June 1956 (age 70); Narok, Kenya
- Occupation: Women's rights activist
- Years active: 1984–present
- Known for: FGM campaigner and Narok's MP Narok North Member of Parliament elected on 9 August 2000.

Agnes Pareyio (born 24 June 1956) is a Maasai Kenyan women's rights activist, politician and founder and director of the Tasaru Ntomonok Rescue Center for Girls, an organization that campaigns against female genital cutting. In 2005 she was the UN Person of the Year and in 2022 she was elected as a member of parliament.

== Early life ==
Pareyio was born in 1956, the daughter of the village chief. She and her father resisted the tradition of her clitoris and labia major and minor being removed. However they could not resist the pressure of the village who questioned what her status would be if she was not cut. Would she be a woman? Pateyio believes they cut further that they meant to. Her father witnessed the operation which was done without anaesthetic and she was told not to cry in front of her father. After the operation she had to have her legs kept apart to prevent the wound free healing with no opening. After she underwent female genital mutilation at 14, against her will, she vowed to prevent FGM from happening to other girls.

== Career ==
Soon after her marriage at 18, Pareyio joined the Kenyan women's organization Maendeleo Ya Wanawake, where she became a leader. Her efforts eventually turned to fighting female genital mutilation.

An opponent of FGM, Pareyio teaches girls about the procedure, using wooden models of the female reproductive tract to show different types of FGM. She challenges cultural practices and engaging with communities that propagate the procedure, suggesting and demonstrating alternative female rites of passage.

Pareyio runs a safe house for young girls escaping from female genital mutilation. She works with each girl's family to help them understand the consequences of FGM and convince them to spare their daughter from the procedure. She also educates women who perform FGM about its harms.

Pareyio was the first Maasai women to be elected Deputy Mayor of her locality. Pareyio has also analyzed the patriarchal social effects of FGM, including the ways that the procedure is used to take girls out of education and other means of economic and social independence.

Pareyio was named United Nations in Kenya Person of the Year in 2005, for her work towards gender equality and women's empowerment.

In 2022 she became the first women MP elected for the constituency of Narok. She was one of several new women MPs as the total number of women MPs elected increased in 2022. Suzanne Kiamba, Amina Laura Mnyazi, Irene Mrembo Njoki, Phyllis Jepkemoi, Marianne Jebet Kitany, Mary Maingi and Pareyio were all new MPs.
