= Elizabeth Mary Wells =

British physician and missionary

- Born: 1863; Clare, Suffolk, UK
- Died: 1918 (aged 54–55); Highbury New Park, Middlesex, London
- Education: London School of Medicine for Women
- Occupations: Medical missionary, physician, surgeon, licentiate
- Known for: Medical missionary work in Jilore and Kahuhia in Equatorial East Africa
- Spouse: Douglas Hooper

Elizabeth Mary Wells (1863–1918), also known as Elizabeth Hooper, was a Roman Catholic British physician and medical missionary. She worked for the Church Missionary Society in Equatorial East Africa, especially in Kahuhia and Jilore. In Kahuhia, she was instrumental in the long-lasting success of the hospital and served as the President at Kennaway Hall, leading the only training center for female missionaries at the time as well as leading two branch dispensaries. While in Jilore and Kahuhia, she dealt with a variety of medical conditions, primarily rheumatic gout, dysentery, and pneumonia.

== Early life and education ==
Elizabeth Mary Wells was born in 1863 in Clare, in Suffolk, England, to Philip and Adelaide Selina P. Wells. Her father was a private schoolmaster in Marylebone and she had a brother, Frederick, older by a year. The family lived at 1 Loudoun Road in St John's Wood, London, during Wells's childhood. She took her preliminary examination to attend the London School of Medicine for Women in December 1891, being accepted later that month and enrolling in October 1892. The LSMW was the first British medical school to train women to be doctors. She graduated as Licentiate of the Royal College of Physicians (L.R.C.P) and as Licentiate of the Royal Faculty of Physicians & Surgeons (L.R.F.P.S.). During her training, she was given the chance of Christian Witness. Having begun her education when women were first being allowed into medicine, and in accordance with her faith, she chose to help other women achieve the same goal of entering the medical field. In conjunction with this, she also spread Christianity and its "power" to those who were not as familiar with Christianity.

== Career ==
=== Jilore ===
Wells met missionary Reverend Douglas Arthur Lownds Hooper of the Church Missionary Society (CMS) in the early 1890s, quickly becoming engaged. Inspired by his work, and having expertise in the medical field they sought, she was inspired to also join the CMS as a medical missionary. Women were not commonly accepted as missionaries at the time, and were only allowed to join the Society as the wife of a missionary. Wells sought the permission of the Medical Board and the CMS' head physician, bolstered by her fiancé – who (among other things) had a reputation as one of the head leaders of a large group of missionaries from Cambridge University that was responsible for adding many missionaries to the CMS list – being established and respected in the organisation.

Having been accepted, Wells travelled with Hooper to Jilore in 1896. It was a location Hooper had previously been working in, about 60 miles north of Mombasa. Known by many as Dr. Hooper now, Wells spent the next four years in medical service in this region of British East Africa (now Kenya), as well as preaching the Gospel. With the facilities created locally and having limited resources, Wells turned to innovation to successfully treat her patients, introducing new techniques and relief care: in one instance, she had to amputate a girl's arm due to a crocodile bite and was able to fit a prosthetic six years later; another patient was a woman who presented with gout who was still being made to work even as she could not, but who quickly recovered when Wells convinced her husband to let her rest a while in her hometown. In 1900, Hooper was poor in health and the couple had to return to England. They spent four years there before being able to return to Jilore, where they stayed until 1906.

=== Kahuhia ===
Hooper was transferred to Kahuhia in 1909, in the Central Province of Kenya. Here, Wells could have much more impact in delivering medical treatment by building on the work of Dr. T. W. W. Crawford, the previous medical missionary there. Crawford had been proud of his work servicing the near-million inhabitants of the region, and was especially derogatory to the native medics, but took furlough in early 1909, causing the need for Hooper and Wells to relocate.

At the hospital in Kahuhia, Wells took responsibility of all the medical work, with Hooper there to ensure that the buildings and materials were suitable for her. The mission medical station was located five miles away from the closest CMS mission station and was nine miles away from Fort Hall, the government administrative centre. Being in such a highly populated district, the station was in need of more facilities. In 1913, its property had already extended over fifty acres, with more land gradually being cleared. The site included the couple's residence, the hospital buildings, and the general mission buildings.

== Personal life ==
On 25 October 1895, at age 32, Wells married Douglas Hooper at St. Mary's Church in Kilburn in London. Hooper had been previously married in 1889, and was a widower with a four-year old son, Handley, when he and Wells met. Hooper had been a missionary of the CMS in East Equatorial Africa since 1885, remaining affiliated with the Society until his death. He had been working in Uyui (part of what is now Tanzania), where he established his own station. There, his focus was on spreading his Christian religion and promoting conversion by performing many baptisms, eventually being ordained as a priest by bishop Alfred Tucker in 1890. Hooper also worked in Mombasa where, in 1890, he formulated an economic plan that would later prove helpful and effective to other missionaries, including Wells. While at Mombasa, along with a group of missionaries, Hooper desired to expand his impact with the goal of advancing to Ulu, in the Ukambani country. Hooper died in London on 3 January 1918.

== Death and legacy ==
After Hooper died, the Society's general committee appointed Wells as president of Kennaway Hall on 4 August 1918. Kennaway Hall was the CMS' recently-acquired training center for female missionaries. Wells stayed in this position until July 1920. While she may not have been practicing medicine, she enjoyed personally teaching and influencing the recruit female missionaries, who would go on to amplify her work.

Wells died on 3 December 1922, having been living on Highbury New Park in London.
