= Amina Laura Mnyazi =

Kenyan politician

- Education: Edith Cowan University, Kenyatta University
- Occupation: politician
- Known for: in the Kenyan Parliament from 2022
- Predecessor: Aisha Jumwa
- Political party: Orange Democratic Movement party

Amina Laura Mnyazi is a Kenyan politician who represents the Malindi Constituency in the Kenyan Parliament.

== Life ==
Mnyazi was schooled in Kenya at the Silversand Academy and Tawheed Muslim Girls. In 2006 she was in Perth, Australia at the Edith Cowan University. She left Perth in 2011 with a degree in marketing and management and a diploma in business to take a masters in politics at Kenyatta University.

She ran for parliament unsuccessfully in 2017.

Mnyazi became a member of the Orange Democratic Movement party. She represents the Malindi Constituency in the Kenyan Parliament after she won the seat in a contest with seven other male candidates taking half of the ~42,000 votes cast. She took over the seat from Aisha Jumwa who had not contested the seat with the expectation that she might become the governor of Kilifi. She was one of several new women MPs as the total number of women MPs elected increased in 2022. Suzanne Kiamba, Irene Njoki Mjembo, Agnes Mantaine Pareyio, Phyllis Jepkemoi,_ Marianne Jebet Kitany, Mary Maingi and Mnyazi were all new MPs.

In August 2024 she unveiled a new electricity supply for the villages of Mshongoleni and Kaoyeni. The work was part of a project called "Last Mile" and it was thought that the new supply would transform life in the villages. She believed that all the villages in her constituency would receive power although there were potential problems due to undersized transformers.
