= Jepkemoi =

Jepkemoi is a surname. Notable people with the surname include:

- Hyvin Jepkemoi (born 1992), Kenyan steeplechase runner
- Phylis Jepkemoi (fl. from 2022), Kenyan politician
