= List of ports in Kenya =

This list of Ports and harbours in Kenya details the ports, harbours around the coast of Kenya.

== List of ports and harbours in Kenya ==
Port/Harbour name	County	Town name	Coordinates	Remarks
Kilindini Harbour	Mombasa county	Mombasa	04°02′S 39°38′E	Port of Mombasa the only international seaport in Kenya and the biggest port in east Africa.
Port of Kilifi	Kilifi county	Kilifi	03°38′S 39°50′E	Medium-sized port
Port of Lamu	Lamu county	Lamu	02°09′S 40°56′E	Medium-sized Port
Malindi Bay	Kilifi county	Malindi	03°12′S 40°07′E	Medium-sized Port
