= Mwea Constituency =

Electoral constituency in Kenya

Mwea
- constituency for the Parliament of Kenya
- Mwea Constituency within Kirinyaga County

- Kirinyaga County within Kenya
- County: Kirinyaga

Current constituency
- Number of members: 1
- Party: UDA
- Member of Parliament: Mary Maingi
- Wards: 8

Mwea Constituency is an electoral constituency in Kenya. It is one of four constituencies in Kirinyaga County. The constituency was established for the 1988 elections. It is divided into two sub-counties: Mwea East and Mwea West. In the 2022 elections, Mary Maingi was elected MP. She was one of several new women MPs as the total number of women MPs elected increased in 2022. However, she was the only woman elected in this county.

== Members of Parliament ==
| Elections | MP | Party | Notes |
|---|---|---|---|
| 1988 | William Kathigi Kibugi | KANU | One-party system. |
| 1992 | Allan Njeru Murigu | DP | |
| 1997 | Alfred Mwangi Nderitu | DP | |
| 2002 | Alfred Mwangi Nderitu | NARC | |
| 2007 | Peter Njuguna Gitau | PNU | |
| 2013 | Peter Njuguna Gitau | TNA | |
| 2017 | Josphat Kabinga Wachira | Jubilee Party | |
| 2022 | Mary Maingi | UDA | |

== Locations and wards ==
There are 8 wards across Mwea constituency and 131,714 registered voters as of 2022.

| Ward | Registered Voters |
|---|---|
| Tebere | 24,491 |
| Mutithi | 19,226 |
| Murinduko | 18,935 |
| Nyangati | 17,095 |
| Thiba | 15,157 |
| Kangai | 12,568 |
| Wamumu | 12,249 |
| Gathigiriri | 11,993 |
| Total | 131,714 |
*As of 2022

| Locations | Population |
|---|---|
| Kangai | 17,660 |
| Kutus | 12,905 |
| Murinduko | 22,593 |
| Mutithi | 22,439 |
| Nyangati | 12,812 |
| Tebere | 32,915 |
| Thiba | 31,689 |
| Total | 153,013 |
