= Fundi Isa =

- Location within Kenya
- Coordinates: 2.94°S 40.1°E
- Country: Kenya
- County: Kilifi County
- Time zone: UTC+3 (EAT)

Fundi Isa, Fundi Issa or Fundisa is a settlement in Kenya's Kilifi County, Magarini constituency, near the Indian Ocean. It has two schools, Fundi-Issa Primary and Fundi-Issa Secondary, as well as a pharmacy, Fundi Issa Dispensary.
