= Moiben Constituency =

Electoral constituency in Kenya

Moiben
- constituency for the Parliament of Kenya
- Moiben Constituency within Uasin Gishu County

- Uasin Gishu County within Kenya
- County: Uasin Gishu
- Population: 181,338
- Area: 770 km^{2} (297.3 sq mi)

Current constituency
- Number of members: 1
- Party: UDA
- Member of Parliament: Phylis Jepkemoi Bartoo
- Wards: 5

Moiben is a constituency in Kenya, one of six constituencies in Uasin Gishu County.
Moiben Constituency is divided into the following wards:

1. Moiben Ward
2. Sergoit Ward
3. Kimumu Ward
4. Tembelio Ward
5. Karuna/Meibeki Ward
