= Masha Mapenzi =

African Gospel and Afro-fusion singer

Masha Mapenzi (born in Watamu, Kenya) is an African Gospel and Afro-fusion singer.

Mapenzi performs in styles such as chakacha, taarab, bango and afrobeat. She was the winner on the first season of Pop Idol in Kenya, performing her own rendition of the famous hymn "When Peace, Like a River".

Mapenzi's first album is titled Uhiko (available as an iTunes download), and includes the single "Nainua Macho Yangu" as well as the tracks "Uhiko", "Mahabubu" and "Tamu Tamu".

The Song "Uhiko" won Çoast Awards - Diaspora Artist of the year 2010 and Coast Awards - Runner up Female Artist of the Year 2010.
