= Irene Mrembo Njoki =

Kenyan politician

Member of Parliament Bahati Constituency, Nakuru County
- Incumbent
- Assumed office 31 August 2022
- Preceded by: Ngunjiri Kimani

Personal details
- Born: Irene Mrembo; 1975 (age 50–51) Nakuru County, Kenya
- Education: Daystar University; Africa Nazarene University
- Occupation: Politician

Irene Mrembo Njoki (born December 1975), commonly referred to as Irene Njoki, is a Kenyan politician who was elected member of parliament of Kenya on 9 August 2022, representing Bahati Constituency, Nakuru County, in the 2022–2027 election cycle. She ran as a member of the Jubilee Party. Before joining elective Kenya politics, she was the personal assistant to James Macharia, then cabinet secretary for Transport, Infrastructure, Housing, Urban Development and Public Works, Shipping and Maritime, in the Cabinet of Kenya (2017–2022).

== Background and education ==
She was born in Bahati Constituency, in Nakuru County, in December 1975. She studied at Africa Nazarene University, graduating with a Bachelor's degree in marketing. Her second degree, a Master of Strategic Management, was awarded by Daystar University.

== Career ==
=== Before politics ===
Her career has taken her through various roles in the private sector, including as personal assistant to the marketing manager of a luxury hotel in Nairobi, and as an Assistant to the Managing Director at Kensta Group, specializing in food supply chain technologies, logistics and finance. She served as the personal executive assistant to the managing director of NCBA Bank Kenya, beginning in 2005.

After 15 years working in the private sector, she joined the Kenyan public service, working as the personal assistant to James Macharia, starting in 2013 when he was the cabinet secretary for Health in the Kenyan cabinet. Later, in a cabinet reshuffle, when he was relocated to the Ministry of Transport, Infrastructure, Housing, Urban Development, and Public Works, Shipping and Maritime, she transferred to the new ministry with him, as his personal assistant.

=== As a politician ===
Beginning in 2018, Njoki began running social programs in the Bahati constituency, including Mrembo Care, which feeds the hungry, especially the elderly. An estimated 50,000 individuals have benefitted, as of July 2022. Another of her programs is Mrembo Educare, a scholarship and bursary fund that has benefited at least 2,000 students in secondary schools and in post-secondary institutions. Approximately 1,400 other students have benefitted from hands-on technical skills from Vera Beauty College, in the areas of barbering, catering, design and fashion, events management, hairdressing, pastry, electrical, and plumbing.

In the national elections held on 9 August 2022, Njoki was elected with 34,308 votes. Her closest competitor, a two-time parliamentarian in the constituency, Kimani Ngunjiri of the United Democratic Alliance political party, received 26,809 votes. An independent candidate, John Karanja Quindos received 2,130. She was one of several new women MPs as the total number of women MPs elected increased in 2022. Suzanne Kiamba, Amina Laura Mnyazi, Agnes Mantaine Pareyio, Phyllis Jepkemoi, Marianne Jebet Kitany, Mary Maingi and Njoki were all new MPs.

== Family ==
She is a married mother of two children.

== See also ==
- Parliament of Kenya
