= Rabai Constituency =

Kenyan electoral constituency

Rabai
- constituency for the Parliament of Kenya
- Rabai Constituency within Kilifi County

- Kilifi County within Kenya
- County: Kilifi
- Population: 120813
- Area: 208 km^{2} (80.3 sq mi)

Current constituency
- Number of members: 1
- Party: PAA
- Member of Parliament: Kenga Anthony Mupe
- Wards: 4

Rabai is a constituency in Kenya. It is one of seven constituencies in Kilifi County. The constituency was created when Kaloleni constituency was split into two.

== Electoral history ==
Elections	MP	Party	Notes
Rabai Constituency created from Kaloleni
2013	William Kamoti Mwamkale	ODM	
2017	William Kamoti Mwamkale	ODM	
2022	Kenga Anthony Mupe	PAA	
