= Mary Maingi =

Kenyan politician

- Occupation: politician
- Known for: Member of parliament for the Mwea Constituency
- Political party: United Democratic Alliance

Mary Maingi is a Kenyan politician who has been a member of parliament for the Mwea constituency. She was the only woman elected in Kirinyaga County in 2022.

== Life ==
Maingi was studying at the Catholic University of West Africa from 2003 to 2009 where she took her first and a master's degree.

She stood as a candidate for the United Democratic Alliance in the 2022 election and she beat six other candidates in the Mwea constituency.

She was one of several new women MPs as the total number of women MPs elected increased in 2022. However she was the only woman elected in her county. Suzanne Kiamba, Irene Njoki Mjembo, Agnes Mantaine Pareyio, Phyllis Jepkemoi, Marianne Jebet Kitany, Amina Laura Mnyazi and Maingi were all new MPs. She was one of several women MPs who were the only women elected in their county. The others included Mary Emaase in Busia County, Naisula Lesuuda in Samburu and Mishi Mboko in Mombasa.

At the start of 2025 she was at Wang’uru Primary School where the construction of eight new classrooms was in progress. In April 2025, a 34-year-old man was in court charged with sending threatening messages to Maingi over Whsatsapp. On 9 June 2025, at the Wang’uru International Stadium, season two of the Mary Maingi Super Cup Football Tournament came to a close. Ninety teams had taken part for prizes.
