= Phylis Jepkemoi =

Kenyan politician

Phylis Jepkemoi Bartoo
- Citizenship: Kenyan
- Education: Kenyatta University (BEd Arts; master's degree in medical physiology); Egerton University (MA in language and linguistics); University of the Witwatersrand (PhD in linguistics)
- Occupations: Politician; Professor of linguistics
- Employer: Egerton University
- Office: Member of Parliament for Moiben Constituency
- Political party: United Democratic Alliance

Phylis Jepkemoi Bartoo is a Kenyan politician. She is a member of the United Democratic Alliance party (UDA) and the member of parliament for the Moiben Constituency from 2022.

== Life and education ==
Bartoo headed Egerton University's faculty of arts and social sciences. She furthered her education at the Kenyatta University where she acquired a B.EdArts degree, and a master's degree in medical physiology. She also attended Egerton University Kenya, where she acquired MA degree in language and linguistics. She also studied in South Africa's University of Witwatersrand, where she obtained a Ph.D. in linguistics. Prior to becoming a senior professor in linguistics, she was the chair of the Department of Literature, Language, and Linguistics. She has been a professor at Egerton University for the past fifteen years.

She has published numerous articles in scholarly journals on her own and with others, as well as supervised a number of postgraduate students. She serves on the boards of the Institute of Women and Gender, Egerton University Radio, Nakuru Town Campus, and CODESRIA.

She is a member of the United Democratic Alliance party (UDA) and in 2022 she became the member of parliament for the Moiben Constituency. She was one of several new women MPs as the total number of women MPs elected increased in 2022. Suzanne Kiamba, Amina Laura Mnyazi, Agnes Mantaine Pareyio, Irene Mrembo Njoki, Marianne Jebet Kitany, Mary Maingi and Bartoo were all new MPs.
