= Bahati Constituency =

- Constituency
- Location of Bahati Constituency
- Coordinates: 0°09′S 36°09′E
- Country: Kenya
- County: Nakuru County
- Established: 2013

Government
  - Member of Parliament: Irene Mrembo Njoki (Jubilee Party)

Area
  - Total: 375.4 km^{2} (144.9 sq mi)

Population (2019)
  - Total: 162,985
  - Density: 434.2/km^{2} (1,124/sq mi)
- Time zone: UTC+3 (EAT)

Bahati is a constituency in Kenya. It is one of eleven constituencies in Nakuru County.

== MPs ==
- Kimani Ngunjiri (2013 to 2022)
- Irene Mrembo Njoki (since 2022)
