= Kilifi North Constituency =

Electoral constituency of Kenya

Kilifi North
- constituency for the Parliament of Kenya
- Kilifi North Constituency within Kilifi County

- Kilifi County within Kenya
- County: Kilifi
- Population: 178,824
- Area: 264 km^{2} (101.9 sq mi)

Current constituency
- Number of members: 1
- Party: UDA
- Member of Parliament: Owen Yaa Baya
- Wards: 7

Kilifi North Constituency is an electoral constituency in Kenya. It is one of seven constituencies in Kilifi County. It was part of the former Bahari Constituency which was split into two by the IEBC Act.` It is also the administrative headquarters for Kilifi county and home to the only university in the county, Pwani University. It has a population of 178,824 people according to the 2019 census report.

== Electoral history ==
| Elections | MP | Party | Notes |
Kilifi North Constituency created from Bahari
| 2013 | Maitha Mugaro | ODM | |
| 2017 | Owen Yaa Baya | ODM | |
| 2022 | Owen Yaa Baya | UDA | |

== Wards ==
The constituency has seven administrative wards with elected representative Members of County Assembly at the County Assembly of Kilifi. These wards are

1. Tezo
2. Sokoni
3. Kibarani
4. Dabaso
5. Matsangoni
6. Watamu
7. Mnarani
