= Peter Njuguna Gitau =

Kenyan politician

Peter Njuguna Gitau (born 1962) is a Kenyan politician. He belongs to the Party of National Unity and was elected to represent the Mwea Constituency in the National Assembly of Kenya since the 2007 Kenyan parliamentary election.
