= Suzanne Kiamba =

Kenyan politician

Member of the National Assembly
- Incumbent
- Assumed office 2022
- Preceded by: Daniel Maanzo
- Constituency: Makueni Constituency

Personal details
- Political party: WDM-K

Suzanne Ndunge Kiamba is a Kenyan politician from the WDM-K. She represents the Makueni Constituency in the National Assembly.

In the 2022 Kenyan general election she became the first woman to be elected MP for the constituency. She was one of several new women MPs as the total number of women MPs elected increased in 2022. Amina Laura Mnyazi, Irene Njoki Mjembo, Agnes Mantaine Pareyio, Phyllis Jepkemoi, Marianne Jebet Kitany, Mary Maingi and Kiamba were all new MPs.

== See also ==
- 13th Parliament of Kenya
