= Kilifi South Constituency =

Electoral constituency of Kenya

Kilifi South
- constituency for the Parliament of Kenya
- Kilifi South Constituency within Kilifi County

- Kilifi County within Kenya
- County: Kilifi,
- Population: 206,753
- Area: 290 km^{2} (112.0 sq mi)

Current constituency
- Number of members: 1
- Party: ODM
- Member of Parliament: Richard Ken Chonga Kiti
- Wards: 5

Kilifi South is a constituency in Kenya. It is one of seven constituencies in Kilifi County. The current MP is Kiti Richard Ken Tonga, first elected in 2017, and re-elected in 2022.

== Electoral history ==
Elections	MP	Party	Notes
Kilifi South Constituency created from Bahari
2013	Salim Idd Mustafa	ODM	
2017	Kiti Richard Ken Tonga	ODM	
2022	Kiti Richard Ken Tonga	ODM	
