= Benedict Fodo Gunda =

Kenyan politician

Benedict Fodo Gunda is a Kenyan politician. He belongs to the Orange Democratic Movement and was elected to represent the Bahari Constituency in the National Assembly of Kenya since the 2007 Kenyan parliamentary election.
