= Gedi, Kutch =

Coordinates: 23.709924°N 70.739765°E

Gedi is a village near Rapar of Kutch district of Gujarat, India.

== Etymology and history ==
Gedi appears to be a corruption of Ghritaghadya winch is found in two inscriptions : one near Rav, dated 1271 (Samvat 1323), where it is mentioned as a large district under Maldev, a Viceroy of Arjundev king of Anhilwad Patan; and the other in the inscription on the Malan well). This name would seem to mean the land, ghadya or padya, of butter, ghrit or ghee. The legend is that a merchant of Anhilwad in want of clarified butter, ghee stole it by magic from Malav's warehouse, and afterwards offered the value. This Malav refused as the stolen butter had been replaced by means of Malav's magic ring. On being assured that butter had been filched, he took the money, and with it built the temple, the well, and the pond.

Gedi is believed to be one of the oldest towns in Kutch. One of the many towns that claim to be the Viratnagar that gave shelter to the Pandavas, it is also said to be the capital of the mythical Raja Gadhesingh, who, though for a time forced to wear the form of an ass, succeeded in marrying the chief's daughter and surrounding the city with a wall of brass. Some of the ass, Gadhaya, coins have been found in the ruins. In course of time the town passed into the hands of a Muslim named Madam. From him it was wrested by Padariya Rajputs, and from them by Vaghelas. This Vaghela chief seems at one time to have been very powerful and to have held the title of Maharana as late as 1476 (Samvat 1533}. Though afterwards subdued by the Jadejas, the head of the family had the title of Rana of Gedi until 1947.

== Places of interest ==
There is the white limestone temple of Mahadev Achaleshvar, built about 300 years ago (1579), by a Sachora Brahman Goval Dave. Twenty-two feet long, eight broad, and twenty-two high, it has a domed porch and a shrine, with a four-faced Mahadev said to be taken from an old temple built by Uttara, a princess of Virat, and dedicated to Uttareshvar, but long since buried. Near the temple, the Malan well, with half buried pillars overgrown with trees, seems to have been repaired in 1476 (Samvat 1533) by Thakar Malav, the son of Makad. Though from its brackishness little used for drinking, its water is thought to be medicinal. Of Ashaba Pir's temple close to the well, nothing remains but a platform thirty-three feet square with moldings and two ruined tombs.

Mahavirswami's Jain temple is a terraced buildings twenty-eight feet by twenty, with a large verandah in front of four shrines, and a central dome supported by sixteen pillars. In the central room are three marble images of Tirthankaras, Mahavir in the middle, and on either side the images of Adinath and of Shantinath. On the back of each of the side figures is a writing, that on Adinath gives 1477 (Samvat 1534); that on the back of Shantinath gives 1864 (Samvat 1921). Mahavir's image, mutilated by the Sindhians, has its eyes, nose, and hands repaired with stucco. This temple is said to have been built by a Vania named Malav, who, according to the local story, owned a straw ring that had the virtue of refilling an empty butter pail. Amassing wealth by the ring's help h e built Mahavir's temple, the Malan well, and the Malsar pond.

The temple of Lakshminarayan, a pyramidal shrine with two domed porches, thirty-six feet long, twenty feet broad and forty feet high, was built in 1840 (Samvat 1897) on the site of an old temple said to have been buried by the 1819 Rann of Kutch earthquake. Inside, a marble image of Lakshminarayan, about 1 3/4 feet high, replaces a handsome old four feet high image of Dasavatar, mutilated by Sarfaraz of Sindh in 1775. This image with that of Suryanarayan, now lying in one of the niches, belonged to the old temple which is said to have been built by the Pandavs. In another niche is a sandstone image of Ganpati having an inscription dated 1618 (Samvat 1675). Under an old jar tree in the market place is a three feet high carved stone image of Kshetrapal. On its pedestal is an inscription of two lines of which only the year 1211 (Samvat 1268) is legible. It is said to have been placed there by the Makwana Rajputs at the time of their settlement.
