= Bahari Constituency =

Electoral district of Kenya

Bahari Constituency was an electoral constituency in Kenya. It was one of three constituencies in Kilifi District, which is now Kilifi County and was established for the 1988 elections. In 2013, Bahari Constituency was dissolved and replaced by Kilifi South Constituency and Kilifi North Constituency.

== Members of Parliament ==
Elections	MP	Party	Notes
1988	Timothy Mtana Lewa	KANU	One-party system.
1992	J. Safari Mumba	KANU	
1997	Jembe Mwakalu	KANU	
2002	Joe Matano Khamisi	NARC	
2007	Benedict Fodo Gunda	ODM	
Dissolved into Kilifi North and Kilifi South

== Locations and wards ==
Locations	Population
Banda ra Salama	10,962
Chasimba	17,871
Junju	28,876
Kilifi Township	45,236
Matsangoni	14,645
Mtwapa	66,268
Mwarakaya	15,140
Ngerenya	14,450
Roka	15,375
Takaungu Mavueni	26,479
Tezo	22,116
Ziani	14,588
Total	292,006
1999 census

Ward	Registered Voters	Local Authority
Chasimba	4,840	Kilifi county
Hospital / Sokoni	9,367	Kilifi town
Junju	7,304	Kilifi county
Kibarani	4,884	Kilifi town
Matsangoni	3,980	Kilifi county
Mavueni/Mkongani	3,251	Kilifi town
Mnarani	2,603	Kilifi town
Mtepeni	7,587	Kilifi county
Mwarakaya	7,462	Kilifi county
Ngala	3,826	Kilifi town
Ngerenya	4,140	Kilifi county
Roka	3,993	Kilifi county
Shauri Moyo / Takaungu	4,401	Kilifi town
Shimo la Tewa	7,138	Kilifi county
Ziani	3,929	Kilifi county
Total	78,705	
September 2005
