= Gede, Kenya =

Coordinates: 3.303°S 40.017°E

Gede
- Village
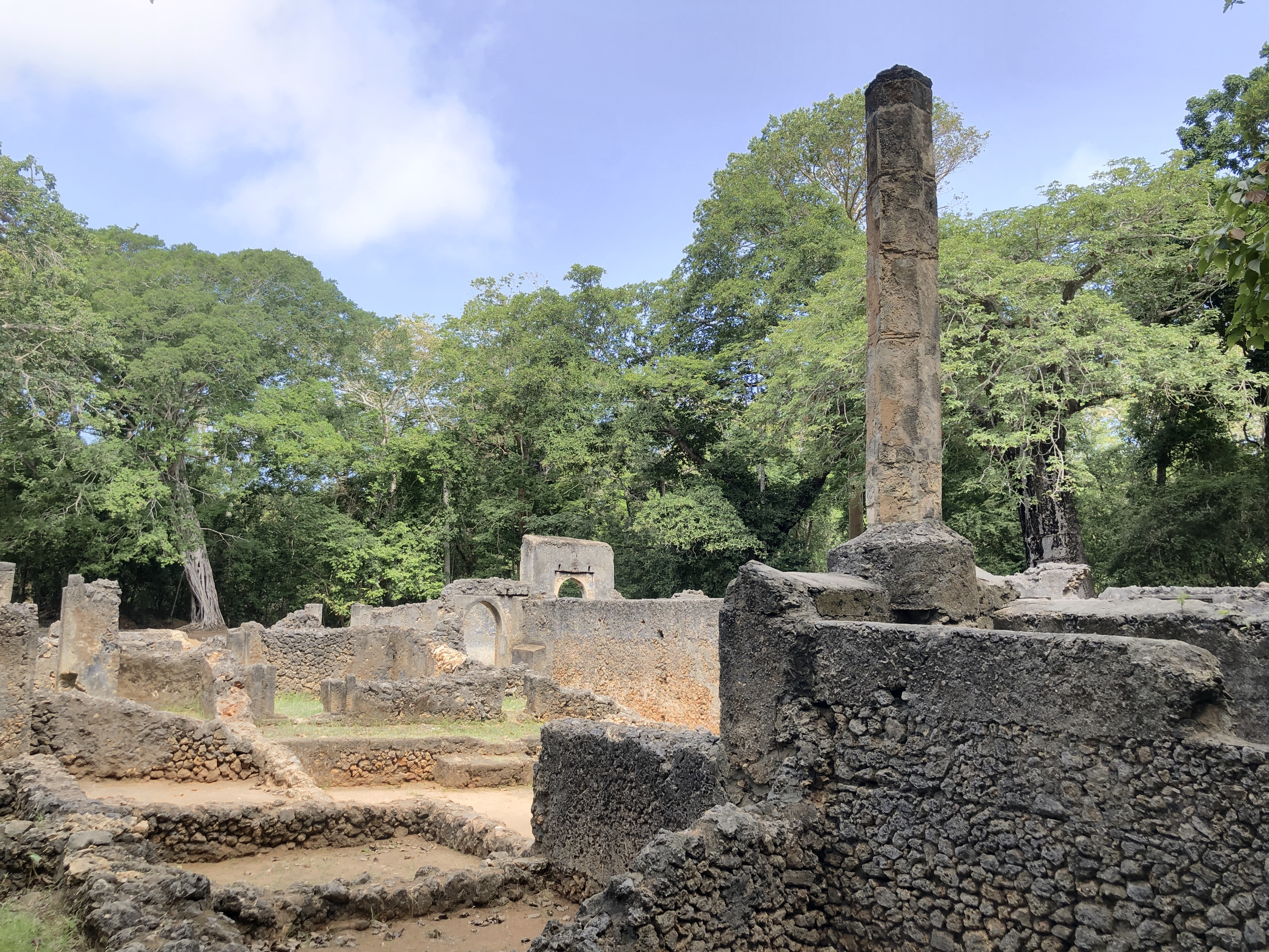
- Ruins of Gedi
- Interactive map of Gede
- Country: Kenya
- County: Kilifi County
- Established: Thirteenth century or earlier

Population (2005)
  - Total: 596

Gede (also known as Gedi) is a village near the Indian Ocean coast of Kenya, lying in Kilifi County, south of Malindi and north of Watamu. The Ruins of Gedi are located there. Although not thought to be mentioned in historic sources, extensive ruins of a former port have been dated to the thirteenth century or earlier, including a tomb with a date corresponding to 1399, until at least the seventeenth century. Later, the port was abandoned and not rediscovered until the 1920s.

The buildings are of coral, earth and plaster, some with designs inscribed. They include a mosque, palace, houses and tombs as well as a fort. The style is classified as Swahili architecture.

The modern village is home to a museum and a butterfly house.

Gede was part of the Malindi District (until it was eliminated in 2010) and it has an urban population of 596 in 2005.

== See also ==
- Gede National Monument
- Historic Swahili Settlements
