= Gedi, Saurashtra =

Village and former non-salute princely state in Gujarat, India

Gedi is a village and former non-salute princely state on Saurashtra peninsula in Gujarat, Western India.

== History ==
The petty princely state in Jhalawant prant was ruled by Jhala Rajput Chieftains.

It 1901, it comprised two villages, with a population of 574, yielding 4,500 Rupees of state revenue (1903–4, mostly from land), paying 1,389 Rupees tribute, to the British and Junagadh State.
