= Marianne Jebet Kitany =

Kenyan politician

Chief of Staff to the Deputy President of Kenya
- In office April 2013 – 2016

Personal details
- Education: Nairobi University; USIU & Columbia Business School; Cornell University

Marianne Jebet Kitany is a Kenyan politician who is member of parliament for Aldai Constituency in Nandi County. She is the former chief of staff to the 11th deputy president of Kenya, William Ruto.

== Early life ==
Kitany joined Alliance Girls High School in 1990 where she studied until 1993. She sat for her Kenya Certificate of Secondary Education (KCSE) examination and pursued a Bachelor of Education Arts (BEd) at Kenyatta University between 1996 and 1998. She took another course at Nairobi University where she studied Master of Science in information technology between 1999 and 2001. She attended Cornell University to take a Certificate in Leadership and Change Management. Between 2008 and 2010 she studied for her Global Executive MBA at the United States International University Africa (USIU) and Columbia universities.

== Career ==
She worked at the Energy Regulatory Commission and Hamilton Harrison & Mathews Advocates as well as being a part-time lecturer at the Faculty of Information Technology at the Strathmore University.

Kitany then worked as the Information and Communications Technology Manager at the Kenya Railways Corporation.

=== Politics ===
During the 2022 elections, she was elected to the 13th Parliament of Kenya for Aldai Constituency on an UDA ticket. Kitany earned 42,015 votes against her predecessor Hon. Cornelly Serem who got 13,309 votes and held the position from 2013 to 2022. She was the second female MP to represent her Aldai constituents in the Kenyan National Assembly. She was one of several new women MPs as the total number of women MPs elected increased in 2022 which included Suzanne Kiamba, Irene Njoki Mjembo, Amina Laura Mnyazi and Mary Maingi.

== Personal life ==
Kitany married a former colleague whom she met in her youth, and the two had one child. They divorced after 13 years. She also married former Meru Senator Mithika Linturi in 2015, divorcing in 2019.
