= Ruins of Gedi =

UNESCO World Heritage site in Kenya

- Magofu ya mji wa kale ya Gedi (Swahili)
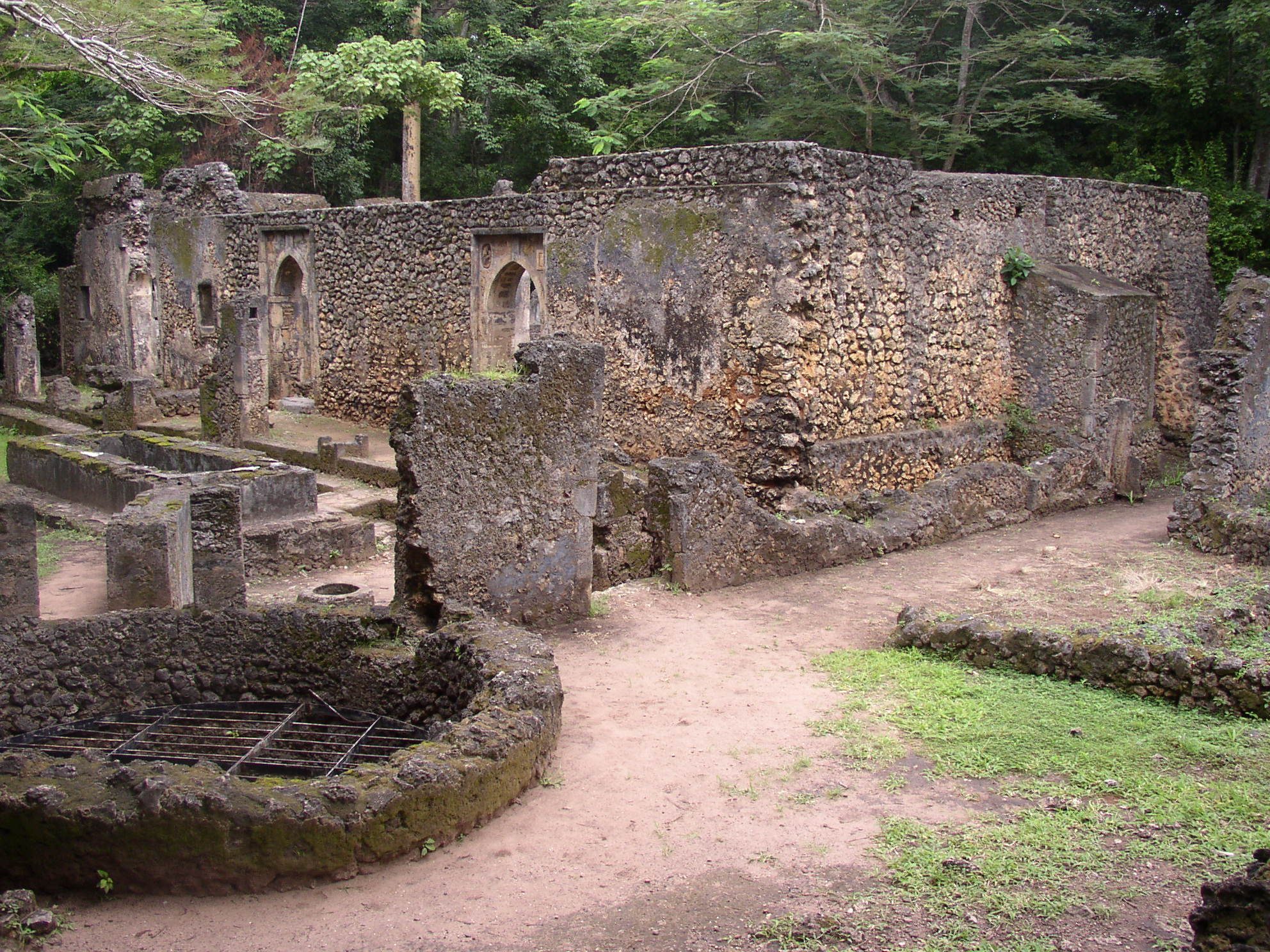
- Ruins of the Great Mosque at Gedi

- Location of the ruins of Gedi
- 3.3094°S 40.0172°E
- Type: Settlement
- Cultures: Swahili
- Location: Kilifi County, Kenya

Site notes
- Architectural style: Swahili
- Condition: Protected
- Owner: Kenyan Government

The Ruins of Gedi (Magofu ya mji wa kale wa Gedi in (Swahili) are a UNESCO World Heritage site near the Indian Ocean coast of eastern Kenya. The site is adjacent to the town of Gedi (also known as Gede) in Kilifi County and within the Arabuko-Sokoke Forest.

Gedi is one of many medieval Swahili coastal settlements that stretch from Barawa, Somalia, to the Zambezi River in Mozambique. There are 116 known Swahili sites stretching from southern Somalia to Vumba Kuu at the Kenya-Tanzania border. Since the rediscovery of the Gedi ruins by colonialists in the 1920s, Gedi has been one of the most intensely excavated and studied of those sites, along with Shanga, Manda, Ungwana, Kilwa, and the Comoros.

The site of Gedi includes a walled town and its outlying area. All of the standing buildings at Gedi, which include mosques, a palace, and numerous houses, are made from stone, are one story, and are distributed unevenly in the town. There are also large open areas in the settlement which contained earth and thatch houses. Stone "pillar tombs" are a distinctive type of Swahili Coast architecture found at Gedi as well.

Gedi's location along the coast and association with similar sites along the Swahili Coast made it an important trade center. Although there are few historical documents specifically associating Gedi with Indian Ocean trade, the site is thought to have been one of the most important sites along the coast. Gedi's architecture and an abundance of imported material culture including pottery, beads, and coins provide evidence of the city's rising prosperity over the course of its occupation from as early as the eleventh century to its abandonment in the early seventeenth century.

== History of discovery and excavation ==
Although Gedi remained unknown to most of British East Africa's colonists until the 1920s, the site was known by the local Mijikenda peoples. Currently, the Giriama, one of the Mijikenda tribes, maintain a large community around the Gedi ruins who view the site as a sacred and spiritual place. Despite changes in their belief system and the prominence of Islam in the region, evil and ancestral spirits are thought by many to reside at Gedi. According to local tradition, the ruins are protected by the spirits of its priests. These "Old Ones" are said to curse anyone who harms the site.

The Gedi ruins were first discovered by colonialists in 1884 after a British resident of Zanzibar, Sir John Kirk, visited the site. However, the ruins remained obscured until their subsequent rediscovery in the 1920s, when the site began to gain attention from the British East African government. Initial excavations at Gedi began in the late-1940s, and the site today remains one of the most intensely studied Swahili Coast settlements. The significance of the ruins has been largely used to assess the site's role within the region in association with other sites to provide insight into the development of Swahili culture, the organization of Indian Ocean trade, the introduction and spread of Islam, and the political and economic ties between Swahili communities through their cultural remains and their spatial relationships.

=== Early archaeological research ===
Excavations commenced at Gedi in 1948 under the supervision of James Kirkman, lasting until 1958 with intermittent excavations occurring from the 1960s to the 1980s. Kirkman excavated the buildings at the city's core, including the palace and several mosques and houses, and also cleared and repaired the walls. The Great Mosque was excavated in 1954 and the palace was excavated in 1963. Following his excavation of the Great Mosque, Kirkman's report "The Arab City of Gedi, The Great Mosque, Architecture and Finds" was published, followed by a series of monographs and papers.

Along with the excavations at Gedi during the 1950s, concurrent excavations also took place at similar sites along the Swahili Coast. Wilson's 1982 survey of the 116 sites along the coast found 34 isolated ruins, which he concluded likely contained possible settlements or isolated dwellings. Although smaller settlements were studied, larger sites received the most attention. Other than Gedi, the site most intensively excavated was Ungwana at the mouth of the Tana River, which was similar in size to Gedi. However, compared to sites similar in size, Gedi had one of the more densely populated urban centers.

=== Recent archaeological research ===
Since the 1990s archaeological research at Gedi and other Swahili coastal settlements has intensified. From the 1980s archaeological research increasingly began to focus more on the relationships between the coastal communities and the interior, challenging the original notion that the development of the Swahili Coast was driven by foreign influence through Indian Ocean trade or by Arab colonists. Another important development in the study of Swahili coastal sites is the increased attention given to remains of structures that were not built of stone. Surveys of the open terrain at Gedi found dense concentrations of mud-thatched dwellings. In 2001, Stephane Pradines from the Institute Francias d'Archeologie Orientale and archaeologists from the National Museum of Kenya conducted a topographical survey of Gedi, which mapped the distribution of neighborhoods in order to investigate the site's urban development. Concurrently, Lynn Koplin conducted surveys of the mud-thatch neighborhoods, focusing on the area between the inner and outer walls. From 2002 to 2003, research at Gedi continued to focus on urban development prior to the fifteenth century, with focus on a group of coral houses built by social elites in the site's urban core.

== History of occupation ==
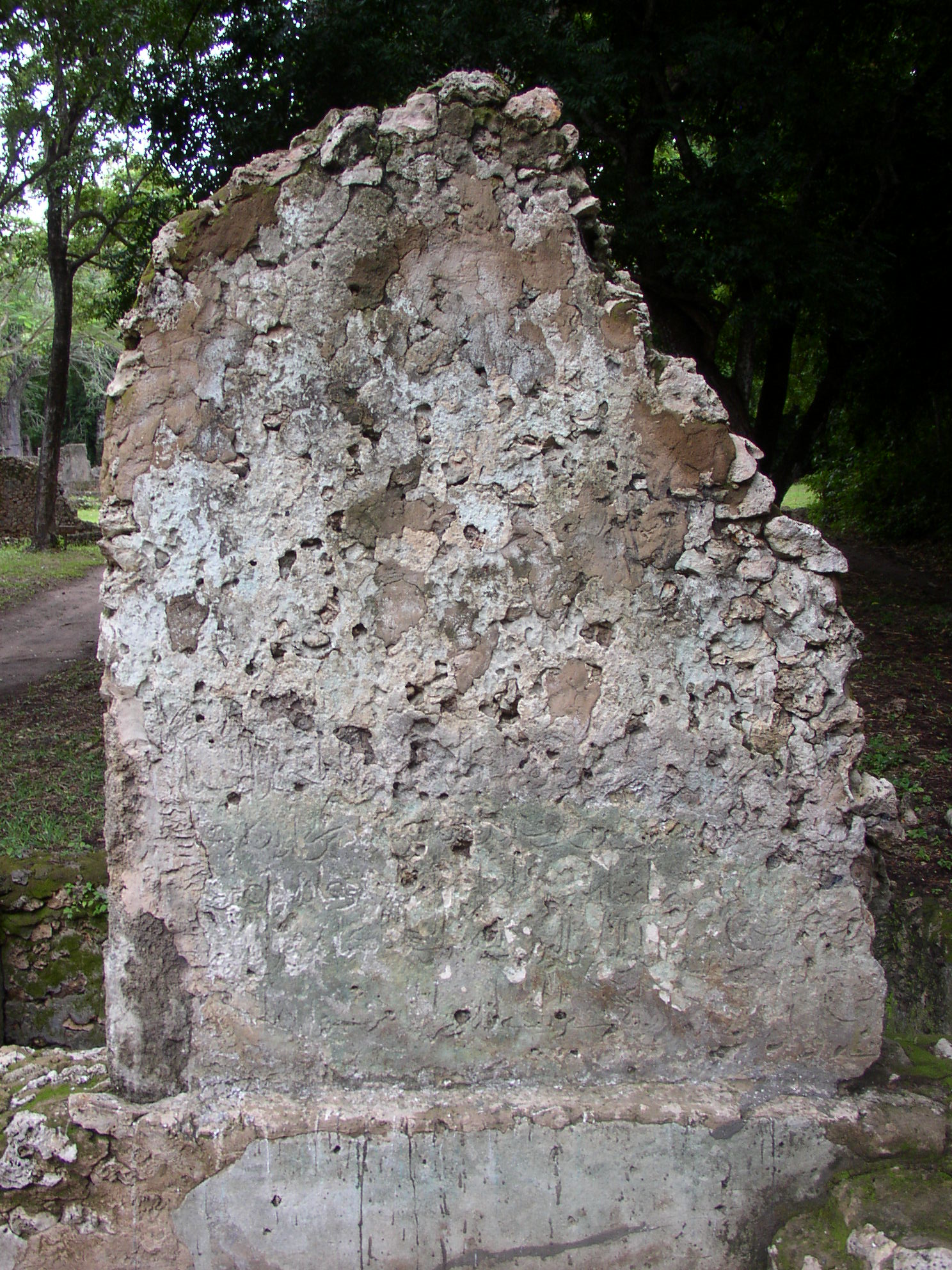
Stone slab with original Arabic inscriptions that was used to date the site

The history of occupation at Gedi has been extrapolated as a result of excavations and historical documents pertaining to its material culture, architecture, and the known history of trade linking the Swahili Coast with the regions adjoining the Indian Ocean. The settlement of Gedi occurred long after the emergence of the earliest settlements along the Swahili Coast with the intensification of trade in the sixth century. The earliest evidence for occupation at Gedi is a grave marker that has been radiocarbon dated to between 1041 and 1278, placing the original settlement of the site sometime in the eleventh or early twelfth century.

Gedi's participation in trade is believed to be the contributing factor in its founding and its later development into a city supporting an estimated population of 2,500 inhabitants at its peak. Despite the absence of historical documents specifically mentioning Gedi, it is considered to be one of the most important sites along the coast. Prior to the construction of the outer wall in the fifteenth century, the city initially developed in the northern section of the modern site. The adoption of Islam by the inhabitants in the twelfth century is marked by the presence of three superimposed mosques in the northern area the city, which were constructed during the twelfth to the fourteenth century. The style of architecture and the absence of minarets characteristic of all of Gedi's mosques has been used to suggest that the locals were influenced by the Ibadite denomination.

From the eleventh through the fourteenth centuries, urban development at Gedi expanded primarily to the north, west and south with the eventual shift of the population around the Great Mosque during the fifteenth century. Gedi's population and prosperity peaked during the fifteenth and into the sixteenth century until it and many other coastal sites began to decline in the late-sixteenth and seventeenth centuries. Gedi was abandoned by the middle of the seventeenth century. The presence of the Portuguese from the sixteenth century has been considered one of the primary factors in Gedi's eventual abandonment with their attempts to monopolize trade and due to armed intervention. However, a drop in the water table seen with the deepening of the well next to the Great Mosque, a Wazimba raid along the coast in 1589, and Oromo migrations and raids from Somalia may have been additional factors in the abandonment of Gedi and most of the mainland coastal sites north of Mombasa.

== Architecture ==
The Gedi ruins make up a site consisting of 45 acres (18 hectares) that lies in the primeval Arabuko-Sokoke Forest. The ancient town at Gedi is divided by two walls, with an outer wall enclosing 45 acres (18 hectares) and an inner wall enclosing 18 acres (7.3 hectares).

Within the inner wall there are two mosques, a palace or Sheikh's house, four large houses, several clustered houses, and four large pillar tombs comprising the urban core. The inner wall also encloses four other houses and three other mosques. Between the inner and outer walls few stone structures have been identified with the exception of two mosques. Immediately beyond the outer wall there is one mosque and several other unidentified structures.

In addition to being divided by the inner and outer walls, which created an urban core occupied by the site's foremost buildings and areas of occupation between and outside of the outer wall, Gedi has a well-established infrastructure. Gedi's structures appear to be formally arranged in accordance with streets laid out in a grid pattern. Additionally the site contained sumps to collect storm water and lavatories in many of its primary buildings.

The majority of Gedi's structures were domestic residences made of thatched-roofed mud buildings concentrated between the outer and inner walls; however, the only buildings that survived to the present were constructed using coral stones extracted from the Indian Ocean. Although several of the buildings predate the fourteenth century, coral became a more common construction material for important structures and elite residences during that time period. All of the buildings at Gedi are single-story structures. The walls and other coral structures were constructed in a similar manner using lime mortar, with most foundations no greater than one foot in depth and filled with stones. Where foundations were used, they tended to be no wider than the wall they supported. There are several examples of non-utilitarian design elements. Doorways for the buildings consist of square framed pointed archways, with tombs and mosques containing spandrels and architraves that have been carved or inlaid with porcelain.

=== Walls ===
The inner and outer walls were constructed similarly with the outer wall measuring nine feet high and 18 inches thick, which was also coated in plaster. The outer wall is believed to have been constructed during the fifteenth century. The construction of the inner wall has been attributed to the Portuguese presence along the coast in the sixteenth century, whilst the presence of gun ports has been used to infer that the walls were not constructed earlier. However, the practicality of the walls as defensive fortification is unclear, since according to Kirkman the walls and gates surrounding the town have no significant strength, which seems to conform to a proposal that the walls and the layout of buildings were used to maintain social barriers. Although the inner wall has a more obvious defensive function and despite the absence of gun ports and the questionable strength of the outer wall, it has nonetheless been credited as being a fortification.

=== Mosques ===
The mosques at Gedi contained wells and washing facilities, which would have been used for cleansing prior to worship. However, they were not constructed with minarets used for the call to prayer, which was more characteristic in other regions. Gedi's mosques were typically laid out with anterooms flanking the central room, which had a roof supported by wood beams resting on square stone pillars. The aisles created by the pillars obstructed the view of the mihrab, which were situated on the north walls in the direction of Mecca.

At Gedi, two of the mosques have been dubbed "Great Mosques." The mosque traditionally known as the Great Mosque is a rectangular building located within the inner wall, which was built during the fifteenth century. The Great Mosque has three entrances and three rows of pillars in the central room supporting the roof. Above one of the entrances is a relief of a spear point flanked by a shield on its spandrel, while on the east entrance the architrave is engraved with a herringbone pattern. The structure also has one of the deepest foundations, with its 21 inch wide walls extending four feet into the subsoil.

The second Great Mosque resided in an older portion of the city, which was inhabited from the eleventh century and located to the north of the walled city. The structure that is standing was constructed in the fourteenth century on top of two earlier mosques from the twelfth and thirteenth centuries. The mosque measures 26 metres (85 feet) in length along its north–south orientation.

=== Tombs ===
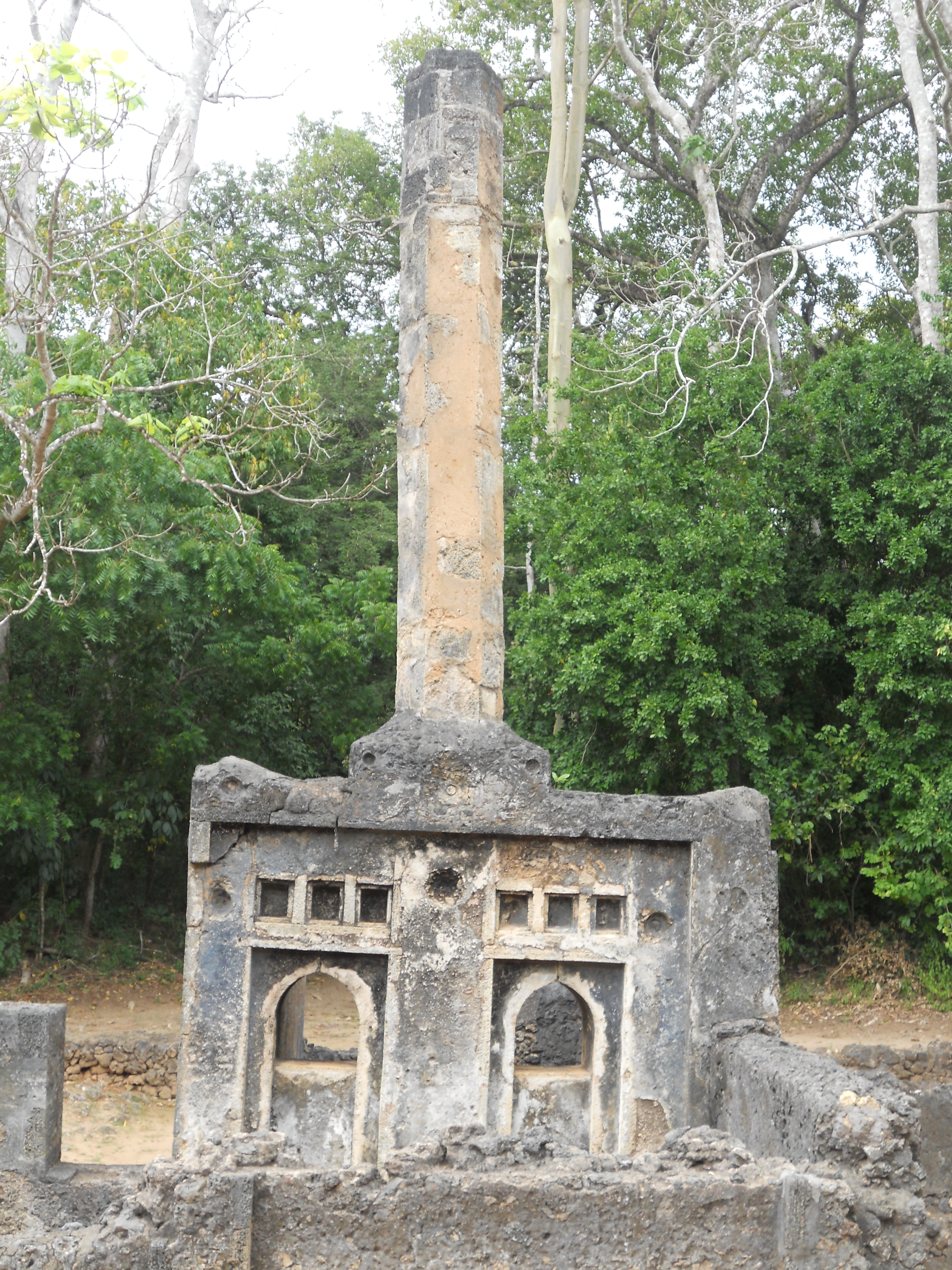
PIllar tomb at Gedi

The pillar tombs at Gedi, which consist of masonry based structures topped with a pillar or column, are part of an architectural style of the medieval Swahili Coastal settlements. A common feature on the pillar tombs at Gedi are decorative recessed panels. Although there are four large pillar tombs at Gedi, the "dated tomb," located within the inner wall, stands out from the rest since it has Arabic inscription on it with the date A.H. 802 (A.D. 1399).

=== Houses ===
The surviving residential buildings at Gedi are all located within the inner wall and are representative of the living conditions of the elite members of Gedi society, since the majority of the population lived in the mud-thatched dwellings outside the city's core. The four largest houses include the House on the Wall, the House on the West Wall, the House of the Dhow, and the Large House. A cluster of smaller houses adjacent to the palace or Sheik's residence includes the House of the Chinese Cash, the House of the Porcelain Bowl, the House of the Cistern, the House of the Two Rooms, the House of the Paneled Walls, the House of the Scissors, the House of the Venetian Bead, the House of the Sunken Court, the House of the Cowries, the House of the Iron Lamp, the House of the Iron Box, and the House of the Well.

Although the houses at Gedi vary in size, their number of rooms, and their layout, the basic house at the site is a three-room structure, which usually contained a forecourt and domestic court. With the three-room layout, there was usually a long main room with two storage and sleeping quarters towards the back of the house. One of the back rooms usually had a storage compartment near the roof with access through a trapdoor. Latrines, usually located toward the back of the main room, were also present in many of the houses, while wells were present in the courtyards of some of the houses. One of the oldest stone houses dates to the fourteenth century and has a long narrow sunken court, which contrasts the wider and deeper courts found in houses constructed during the fifteenth century. The entrances of houses have a greater deal of variability in the configuration of their passageways, since many of the houses were highly concentrated and laid out to maximize the use of available space.

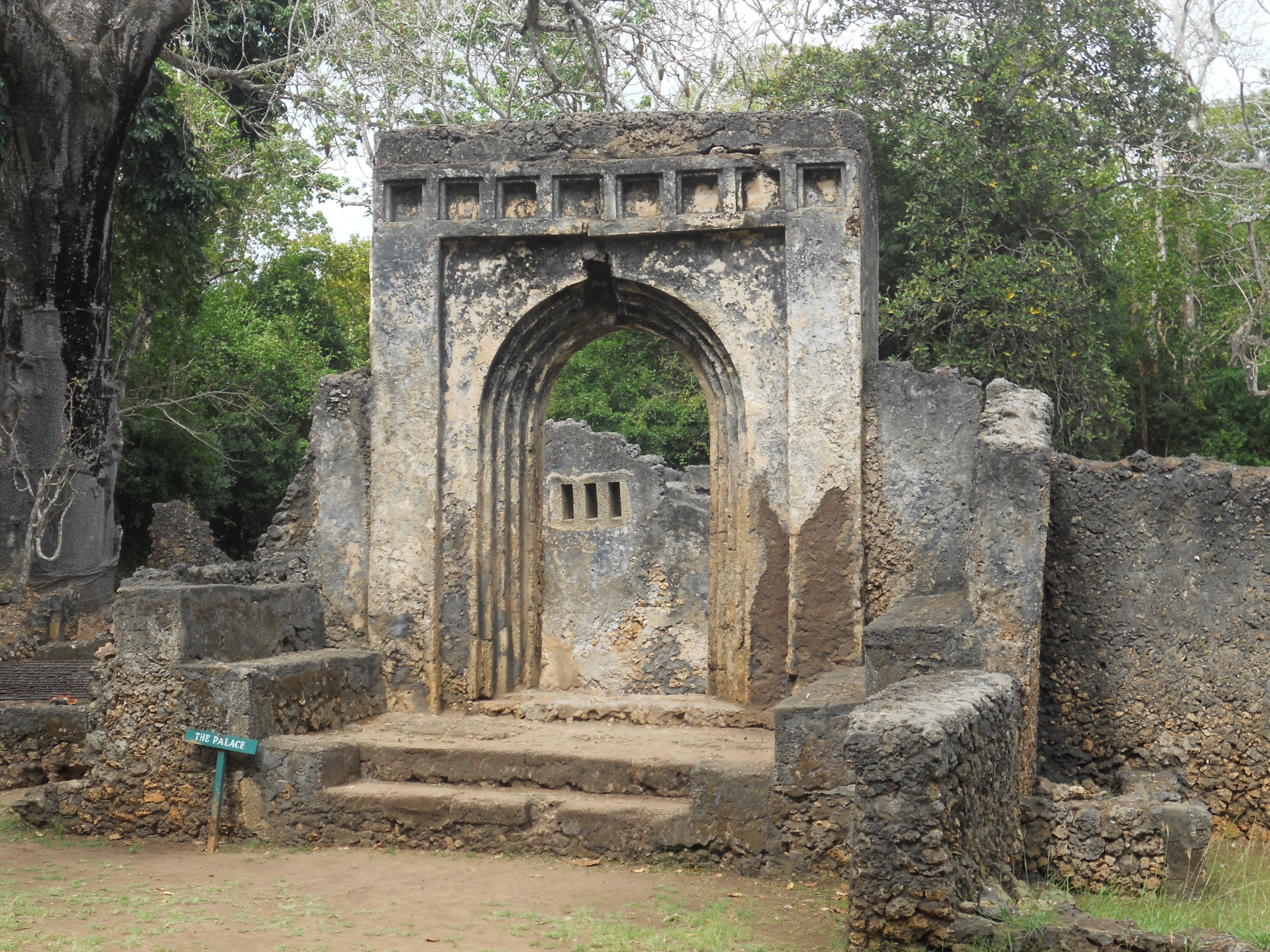
The palace at Gedi

=== Palace ===
The palace, which housed the city's sheikh, had a large central room with two anterooms, each containing its own courtyard. A series of residential rooms were accessible from the main hall. There were also two additional courts, the audience court and the reception court, which were accessed through different gates.

=== Hinterland ===
Gedi also has a hinterland consisting of several smaller sites made up of either solitary mosques and tombs or several houses. The sites of Shaka and Kilepwa are nearby. Kilepwa, located on an island in Mida Creek, is closer to Gedi and consists of three stone houses. There is also an isolated mosque at the west end of the creek, a mosque at Watamu, and a mosque and tombs at Kiburugeni.

== Material culture ==
Excavations at Gedi have uncovered numerous artifacts, but the most abundant and commonly discussed in literature are beads and ceramics, which have been used to identify trade and to obtain dates for the site's occupation. Many of the names given to the stone houses refer to the objects found within or in association with them including two Chinese coins, a porcelain bowl, scissors, a Venetian Bead, cowrie shells, an iron lamp, and an iron box. The material remains found at Gedi have been found to be similar to the remains at adjacent Swahili coastal settlements with the greatest degree of variation among the styles of pottery represented. Of eight sites examined by Kirkman, the sites of Gedi, Ungwana, and Kilepwa had nearly identical material remains prior to the fifteenth century, while the sites of Mnarani, the Pillar Tomb at Malindi, Takwa, Kinuni, and Kilindidni increasingly similar material culture over the course of the fifteenth through seventeenth centuries. In addition to local production, one of the major contributors to the presence of cultural materials found at the site is due to the importance of Indian Ocean trade, which assumed a growing role in East Africa at the beginning of the Islamic era in the seventh century.

=== Currency ===
It is speculated that cowrie shells may have been the principal currency at Gedi. Cowrie shells have been recovered in the store rooms of the houses and found in greater abundance than struck coins, represented by only two coins of Chinese origin. The use of cowries as currency is supported by their historical use as tender in various parts of Africa, and Kirkman estimated the exchange rate of cowrie shells to the gold dinar to be 400,000 to 1. However, there are examples of locally struck coins at contemporary sites, but none have been recovered at Gedi. The use of beads as a currency has also been proposed by J. F. Schofield, who claims that a decline in the number of beads recovered in the upper stratigraphic layers reflects a decline in their value around the fifteenth century.

=== Beads ===
There are several classifications of beads common to the Swahili coastal settlements that have been found at Gedi. In his examination of beads found at Gedi and the Limpopo Valley (Mapungubwe), Schofield placed beads into three categories: red, blue, green, and yellow cylinders made from cane glass; smaller black, red, green, yellow, and blue biconical and lenticular beads made from wound glass; and spheres of red, black, and yellow pressed glass. Kirkman similarly created eight classifications of beads. All but 25 of the 558 beads categorized as class 1–3 were made from opaque glass. During his excavations at Gedi, Kirkman recovered 631 beads in six stratigraphic layers. Monochrome yellow, green, and black wound and pressed glass beads formed in melon, biconical, globular, barrel, and cylindrical shapes were the most common styles represented in strata from the fourteenth century and sporadically appeared in later levels. Small drawn cane glass beads are also commonly represented in fourteenth and fifteenth century levels with the colors green, opaque red, yellow, and black occurring more frequently than blue, brown, and red. It is believed that Islamic traders brought the majority of glass beads to East Africa, which were traded across the continent, since the only current evidence for glass production West of Egypt and Nubia is at the Igbo Olokun Grove at Ile-Ife in southern Nigeria.

=== Pottery ===
Numerous types and styles of ceramics have been found during the excavations at Gedi including Chinese porcelain, Islamic glazed ware, and locally produced earthenwares. Several examples of the ceramics recovered at Gedi are represented in different quantities at other coastal sites. Red slipped pottery is rare at Gedi, compared to other inland sites, while bowls with rounded bottoms, flat rims, and incised ornamentation on top of the rims are more common at Gedi. White to cream colored bowls were also found in small quantities, along with an isolated pottery type that has a golden brown luster. A sherd with a trellis pattern is a possible import from the African interior.

==== Imports ====
Ceramic that were imported to Gedi represent either direct or indirect trade with China, South Asia, and the Islamic world. Islamic pottery found at Gedi was wheel spun, glazed, and kiln fired, which includes sgraffito, Yemeni black on yellow ceramics, and figured wares frequently depicting floral designs on blue and white panels. Sgraffiato is red-bodied earthenware with yellow or green glaze that was common in modern-day Iraq from the ninth to the sixteenth century. A type of polychrome stoneware from the sixteenth century characterized by grey, green, and brown glazes may have been made in Persia or India as an attempted imitation of Chinese porcelain. Another type of partially grey glazed bowls with circular decorations on their interior is believed to come from Indochina since the disappearance of the style coincides with the Thai conquest of the region in AD 1467. Various types of Chinese pottery also appear at Gedi, including celadon and blue and white porcelain, which were found in large enough volumes to assume that a significant portion of the population had access to higher quality wares, while sherds were also found inlayed in the mosques.

==== Local wares ====
Pottery produced locally in East Africa was shaped by hand, unglazed, and assumed to be open fired, but it has been proposed that the absence of evidence for kilns may be the result of mistaking their remnants for metal furnaces. However, the absence of glazed and wheeled pottery illustrates that the inhabitants of the Swahili Coast did not adapt these technologies as a result of Indian Ocean trade, but were primarily the recipients of finished products in exchange for other local produce. Conversely, fifteen different potters' marks have been found at Gedi on pottery found on or near the surface of the site dating to the fifteenth and sixteenth centuries, which has been used to suggest the site may have had a communal kiln at that time. The pots inscribed with the potters marks show the variation of different types and styles of ceramics over time, which were influenced by local production, as well as, the adaption of foreign design elements. Prior to the diversification of local styles and types, early ceramics at Gedi were more uniform and contained similarities with ceramics found at other coastal sites. Despite the increase of imported ceramics in the fifteenth century, local varieties continued to be present in later levels of the sites occupation.

==== Ceramic chronology ====
In the fourteenth century, celadon was a prized import in East Africa, which was initially obtained from the Ming Dynasty in exchange for ivory. However, knowledge of direct exchange with the Chinese is restricted to a single account of a Chinese fleet harbored off of Malindi and Mombasa between 1417 and 1419. The number of imports from China and elsewhere continued to increase throughout the fourteenth and fifteenth centuries, represented by a large number of black on yellow Islamic wares and celadon. Also during the fourteenth century, local wares began to diversify with Gedi's expanding economy. During the beginning and end of the fifteenth century, respectively, blue and white porcelain began to gradually replace celadon and monochrome Islamic wares completely replaced black on yellow types. During the same century, local wares began to change with the reduction in the number of incised ornamental patterns and a shift to long necked-pots, compared to earlier short-necked variants. In the following century, blue and white porcelain and monochrome Islamic wares became the dominant imports; a trend that began to emerge in the previous century and would continue until Gedi's decline in the seventeenth century.

==== Pottery associated with the dated tomb ====
The array of different types and styles of ceramic found during the excavations of Gedi provide information about the city's trade ties through the origin of imported vessels and aid in dating the site through seriation. At Gedi, a chronology has been established for the appearance of many of the ceramics, which have been found in deposits up to five feet. The dated tomb with an inscription connecting it to AD 1399 has served as a datum point for dating the stratigraphic layers. Celadon, Islamic monochromes, and blue and white Chinese porcelain were found in levels above the tomb, which date to the fourteenth and fifteenth centuries. Below the tomb, yellow and black Islamic wares were found down to the natural soil, while celadon was found in layers immediately below the tomb. The celadon below the tomb varied from the celadon found above the tomb, since carvings of lotus pedals were more common on the celadon in the lower layers. Given the date of the tomb, it was determined that the ceramics above the tomb dated to the fifteenth century, which helped extrapolate dates for the remaining stratigraphy.

== Economy ==
Local industries and trades likely included pottery production, metal working, construction, spinning and weaving cloth, fishing, trade, and possibly the production of salt, which are represented in the archaeological and historical record at a number of coastal sites. In addition, the local coral architecture using limestone mortar also indicates the presence of local trades associated with construction and masonry.

Food production at Gedi likely involved a mixed economy based on livestock, as well as agricultural and horticultural production. Some foods were introduced through trade. Available crops included millet, African rice, cocoyam, coconuts, bananas, citrus fruits, pomegranates, figs, sugar cane, cotton, and various vegetables, while the principal livestock was likely cattle. Sheep, goats, and chickens played an important role as well.

Swahili coastal settlements frequently conducted trade with the interior, obtaining goods for overseas trade or local consumption. However, isolated and small settlements have been interpreted as hinterlands that developed around and supported the economies of the larger settlements. Small settlements or hamlets were established between the fourteenth and sixteenth centuries within the vicinity of Gedi including sites at the end of Mida Creek, Kiburugeni, Watamu, Shaka, and Kilepwa. These smaller settlements are thought to represent agricultural communities that provided Gedi with most of its agricultural produce.

=== Maritime trade ===
The history of maritime trade along the coast of East Africa dates to the Classical period. The Periplus Maris Erthraei, written by an Egyptian-Greek merchant circa AD 40–55, described trading ports along the Indian Ocean including Azania, a historic designation of the East African coast extending southward to present day Tanzania. Physical evidence for trade predates the earliest towns in the ninth century with the discovery of four Roman beads from the fourth century and pottery from the fifth century. Roman documents from the first through fifth centuries, as well as, Ptolemy's Geographia also provide historical accounts of trade with East Africa, followed by a dearth of historical documents until the tenth century. After the fall of the Roman Empire in the fifth century, Arab, Indian, and Chinese shipping grew in importance, which was eventually dominated by Persia after its conquest of southern Arabia and Egypt in AD 515 and AD 616. It has been proposed that trade between the Swahili Coast and Persia, as well as later Islamic merchants following the spread of Islam after AD 632, contributed to the settlement and development of the coastal sites.

Gedi's participation in maritime trade can be seen in the increasing frequency of imports found at Gedi over the course of the fourteenth and fifteenth centuries. Conditions along the Atlantic coast prevented European nations from opening sea lanes until the early-sixteenth century, limiting maritime trade to states with easy access to the Red Sea and the Indian Ocean. Many artifacts found at Gedi including much of the ceramics, all the beads, and the two Chinese coins resulted from either direct or indirect trade with the Near East, Arabia, China, India, and Indochina. Swahili coastal settlements exported gold, ivory, slaves, ebony, mangrove poles, copper, copal gum, frankincense, myrrh, and crystal rock.

Maritime trade along the coast of East Africa was facilitated by trade winds in the Indian Ocean, as well as relatively short distances between land masses. Gedi and other large, contemporary mainland sites often had poor anchorages compared to later sites along the coast, considering the exposure of their shorelines, availability of sheltered harbors, and water depth upon approach. However, despite reduced access to good anchorage, Gedi and other large mainland sites were able to maintain a high degree of economic success. Their success in trade may have been influenced by the early establishment of trade routes and available commercial support from their hinterlands.

== Conservation and administration ==
Gedi was made a historic monument in 1927. The site was declared a protected monument in 1929, after looters began removing Chinese porcelain inset as architectural decoration. In 1939, the Kenya Public Works Department began restoring structures that were at the greatest risk of collapse. Further site restoration, primarily clearing vegetation overgrowth, was conducted in 1948–1959 by James Kirkman, who was appointed warden of the site after Gedi and the surrounding forest was declared a national park in 1948.

In 1969, stewardship of Gedi was turned over to the National Museums of Kenya. The site is currently administered by the museum's Department of Coastal Archaeology. In 2000, the construction of a museum funded by the European Union concluded, which features a permanent display on Swahili culture.

On July 29, 2024 the site was inscribed as Kenya’s 8th UNESCO world heritage site.

== 3D Model ==
Most of the Gede Ruins were spatially documented in 2010. A 3D model can be viewed here.

== See also ==
- Historic Swahili Settlements
