= Jilore =

- Location within Kenya
- Coordinates: 3.18°S 39.9°E
- Country: Kenya
- County: Kilifi County
- Time zone: UTC+3 (EAT)

Jilore is a village in Kenya's Kilifi County, approximately 30 km (19 mi) west of Malindi. The majority of residents are Giriama. Jilore has sandy soil and hilly terrain with few flat areas, and most residents are subsistence farmers who grow maize and cassava and rear goats, ducks, and chickens as livestock. Subsistence fishing is also practiced in nearby Lake Jilore. Coconuts and cashews are grown by some villagers as commercial crops.

Homesteads typically have multiple structures to house extended family members sharing the same compound, and are scattered across the area, being separated by agricultural fields or patches of forest, grassland, and scrubland.

Many homes are mud-walled houses thatched with coconut leaves, and unscreened windows, holes in walls, and open spaces in eaves can allow for entry by mosquitoes. In 2002, Jilore Dispensary, the medical facility serving the village and surrounding areas, reported a 40.5% prevalence of malaria caused by Plasmodium falciparum.

In 1890, with the assistance of the Imperial British East Africa Company, the Church Mission Society established a mission in Jilore, which had previously been considered to be too hostile a region for CMS missionary activity. The Reverend Douglas Arthur Lowndes Hooper oversaw operations in Jilore from around 1890 to around 1895.

As of 2019, the population of Jilore was 4,398, with 700 total households across 26.3 square kilometers and a population density of 167 people per square kilometer. A census conducted by KETRACO (Kenya Electricity Transmission Company) in 2022 recorded a total population in Jilore of 1,077 47.63 male and 52.36 female, 29% of whom would be displaced by the transmission line.

The village is bordered by the Sokoke forest to the south, and there is a forest station for the Arabuko-Sokoke National Park's forest reserve in Jilore.

Jilore is being impacted by a planned KETRACO transmission network improvement project, which proposed construction of a 82.5 km (51.3 mi), 220-kilovolt transmission line from a substation in Malindi to a substation in Kilifi. As of 2024, although transmission lines were already in place and construction for the project was underway, residents of Jilore had yet to receive compensation for their land and buildings.
