= Kilifi County =

Kenyan Coastal county

Coordinates: 3.66667°S 39.75°E

- County
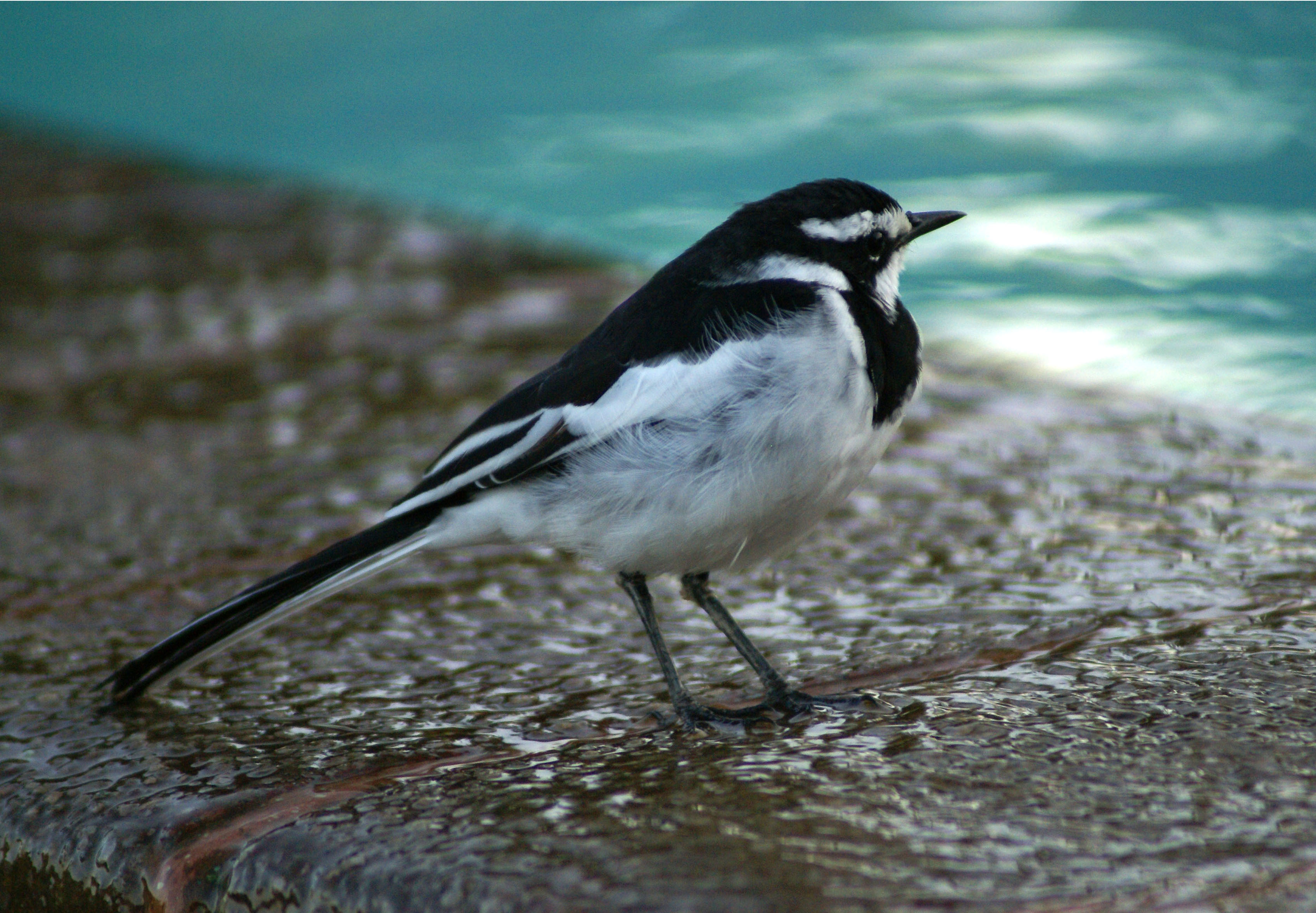
- An African pied wagtail in Kilifi, Kenya

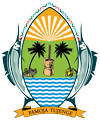
- Flag Coat of arms

- Location in Kenya
- Country: Kenya
- Formed: 4 March 2013
- Capital: Kilifi

Government
  - Governor: Gideon Mung'aro

Area
  - Total: 12,245.9 km^{2} (4,728.2 sq mi)

Population (2019)
  - Total: 1,440,958
  - Density: 117.669/km^{2} (304.760/sq mi)

GDP (PPP)
  - GDP: ▲$5.931 billion (12th)(2022)
  - Per Capita: ▲$3,831 (2022) (26th)

GDP (NOMINAL)
  - GDP: ▲$2.178 billion (2022) (12th)
  - Per Capita: ▲$1,407 (2022) (26th)
- Time zone: UTC+3 (EAT)
- Website: www.kilifi.go.ke

Kilifi County is a coastal Kenyan county. It was formed in 2010 as a result of a merger of Kilifi District and Malindi District, Kenya. Its capital is Kilifi and its largest town is Malindi. The county had a population of 1,453,787 people following the 2019 census and covers an area of 12,245.90 km^{2} (4,728.17 sq mi).

The county is located north and northeast of Mombasa. Kilifi has fewer tourists than Mombasa County, however there is some tourism in Kikambala, Watamu, Malindi and Kilifi. The county is known for the Ruins of Gedi, which includes mosques and tombs dating from the 11th to the 17th century.

== Tourism ==
Tourism and fishing in Kilifi County are the major economic activities due to its proximity to the Indian Ocean. The major tourist attractions in Kilifi County are the Ruins of Gedi, Watamu Marine National Park, the Malindi Museum, the Rabai Museum, Matungu Beach, and the Kaya forest. It also contains the Mnarani ruins that date back to between the 14th and 17th century.

Kilifi was in 2025 listed by the New York Times among 'Top 52 Places to visit in 2025'.

== Economy ==
The county has a strong industrial sector with the Mabati Rolling Mill and the Athi River Cement Factory contributing heavily to the region's economy in employment provision and income generation.

Kilifi County is also home to Africa's largest medical device manufacturer, Revital Healthcare (EPZ) Limited, which was founded in 2008 to champion healthcare manufacturing and sustainability in Sub-Saharan Africa.

== Agriculture ==
Opportunities exist in agriculture, particularly dairy and crop farming thanks to fertile soil and good weather. The county had a successful cashew nut milling industry. Maize and cassava are the main subsistence crops and the main cash crops grown in the county include coconuts, cashew nuts, sisal, citrus fruits, mangoes and pineapples.

== Demographics ==
Kilifi county has a total population of 1,453,787, of which 704,089 are males, 749,673 are females and 25 are intersex persons. There are 298,472 households, with 4.4 persons per household on average, and a population density of 116 people per square kilometre. The major communities living in Kilifi County include Mijikenda, Swahili, Bajuni, Indians, Arabs and Europeans.

Historical population
Year	Pop.	±%
1979	430,986	—
1989	591,903	+37.3%
1999	825,855	+39.5%
2009	1,109,735	+34.4%
2019	1,440,958	+29.8%

=== Religion ===
1. Christian (67.8%)
2. Muslim (17.6%)
3. Other Religions (4.30%)
4. Atheist/No data (10.3%)
Religion in Kilifi County

Kilifi County has a Christian majority, with 68% of residents professing Christianity. 18% of residents are Muslim and 10% are atheist/no data.

== Administrative divisions ==
Kilifi county has 7 sub-counties and 35 county assembly wards.

=== Constituencies ===
The county has 7 Constituencies:

Constituency	Population (2009 census)	Area (km^{2})	Number of wards	Wards
Kilifi North	207,587	405	7	Tezo, Sokoni, Kibarani, Dabaso, Matsangoni, Watamu, Mnarani
Kilifi South	171,607	401	5	Junju, Mwarakaya, Shimo la Tewa, Chasimba, Mtepeni
Kaloleni	139,302	651	4	Mariakani, Kayafungo, Kaloleni, Mwana Mwinga
Rabai	113,622	241	4	Mwawesa, Ruruma, Kambe-Ribe, Rabai
Ganze	137,664	2,942	4	Ganze, Bamba, Jaribuni, Sokoke
Malindi	162,712	627	5	Jilore, Kakuyuni, Ganda, Malindi, Shella
Magarini	177,241	6,979	6	Maarafa, Magarini, Gongoni, Adu, Garashi, Sabaki
Total	1,109,735	12,245.90	35	

Bahari Constituency, which was formed in 1988, was disbanded in 2013 and superseded by two new constituencies, Kilifi North Constituency and Kilifi South Constituency.

== Politics ==
Gideon Mung'aro is the current governor of Kilifi County, having served since August 2022. Stewart Madzayo has represented Kilifi County in the Senate since 2017. Gertrude Mbeyu Mwanyanje is the woman representative elected in 2017.

County Executive Committee
	Number
The Governor	1
The Deputy Governor	1
The County Secretary	1
The CEC Members	10
Total	13

== Education ==
Kilifi County has 1071 ECD centres, 757 primary schools, 178 secondary schools, 13 youth polytechnics, and 280 adult education centres.

Educational institutions in Kilifi County, 2014
Category	Public	Private	Total	Enrolment
ECD Centres	602	469	1071	104,362
Primary schools	526	231	757	310,007
Secondary schools	132	46	178	47,010
Youth Polytechnics	13	0	13	
Adult Education Centres	280	0	280	

== Health ==
There are a total of 235 health facilities in the county with one county referral hospital.

Health Facilities by Ownership
	Government	*FBO	Private	NGO	TOTAL
Hospitals	5	2	10	0	17
Health centres	13	0	1	3	17
Dispensaries	70	11	2	4	87
Clinics	1	0	109	4	113

== Transport and Communication ==
The county is covered by a network of 3,678.6 km of roads. Of this, 2,230.9 km is surfaced by earth, 1,091.5 km is surfaced by murram and 356.2 km is covered by bitumen.

The county's main highways are Mombasa Malindi highway and Kaloleni Mavueni.

There are 7 post offices, with 6,800 installed letter boxes, 6,120 rented letter boxes and 680 vacant letter boxes.

== Image gallery ==
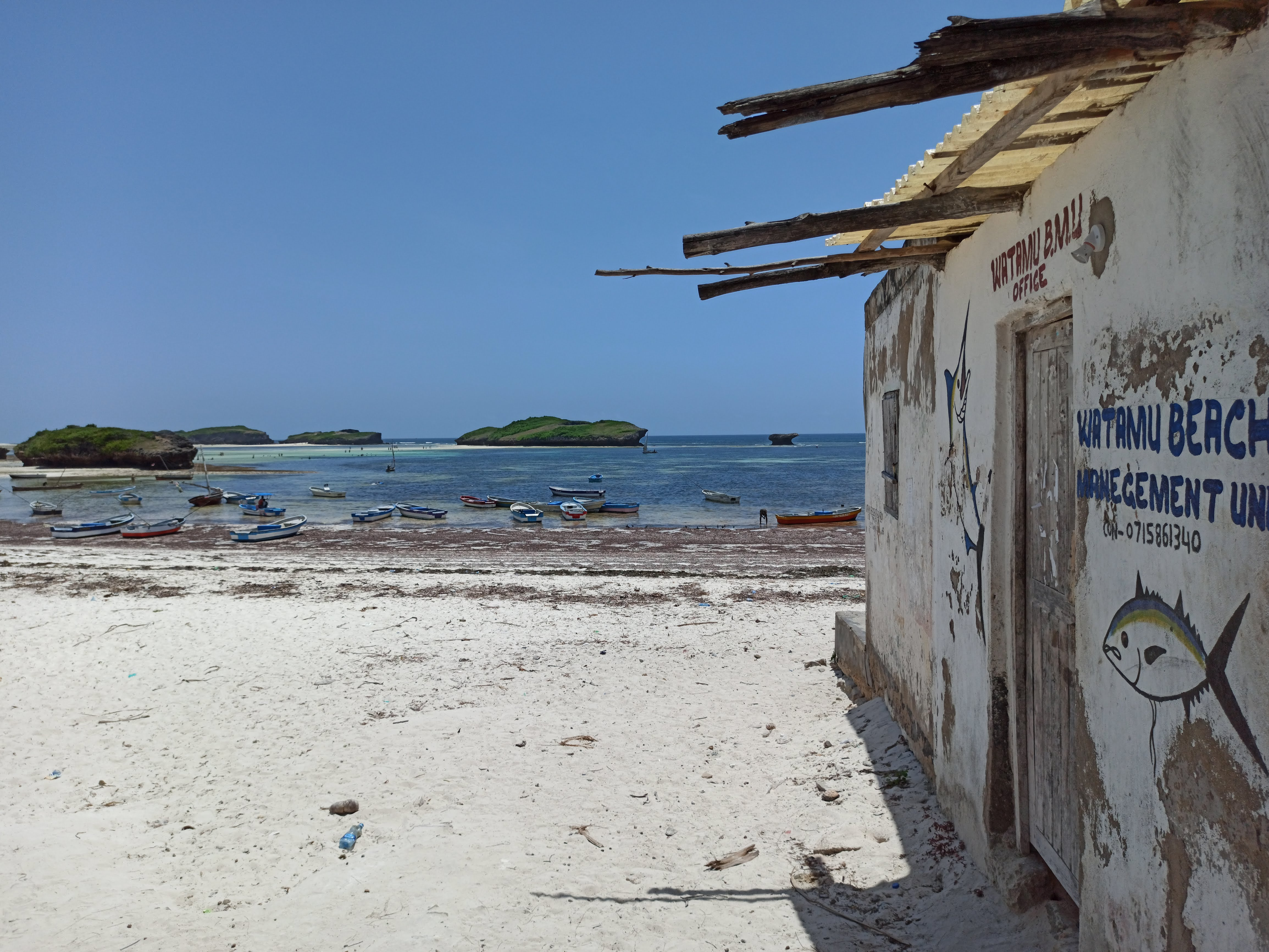
Watamu Beach

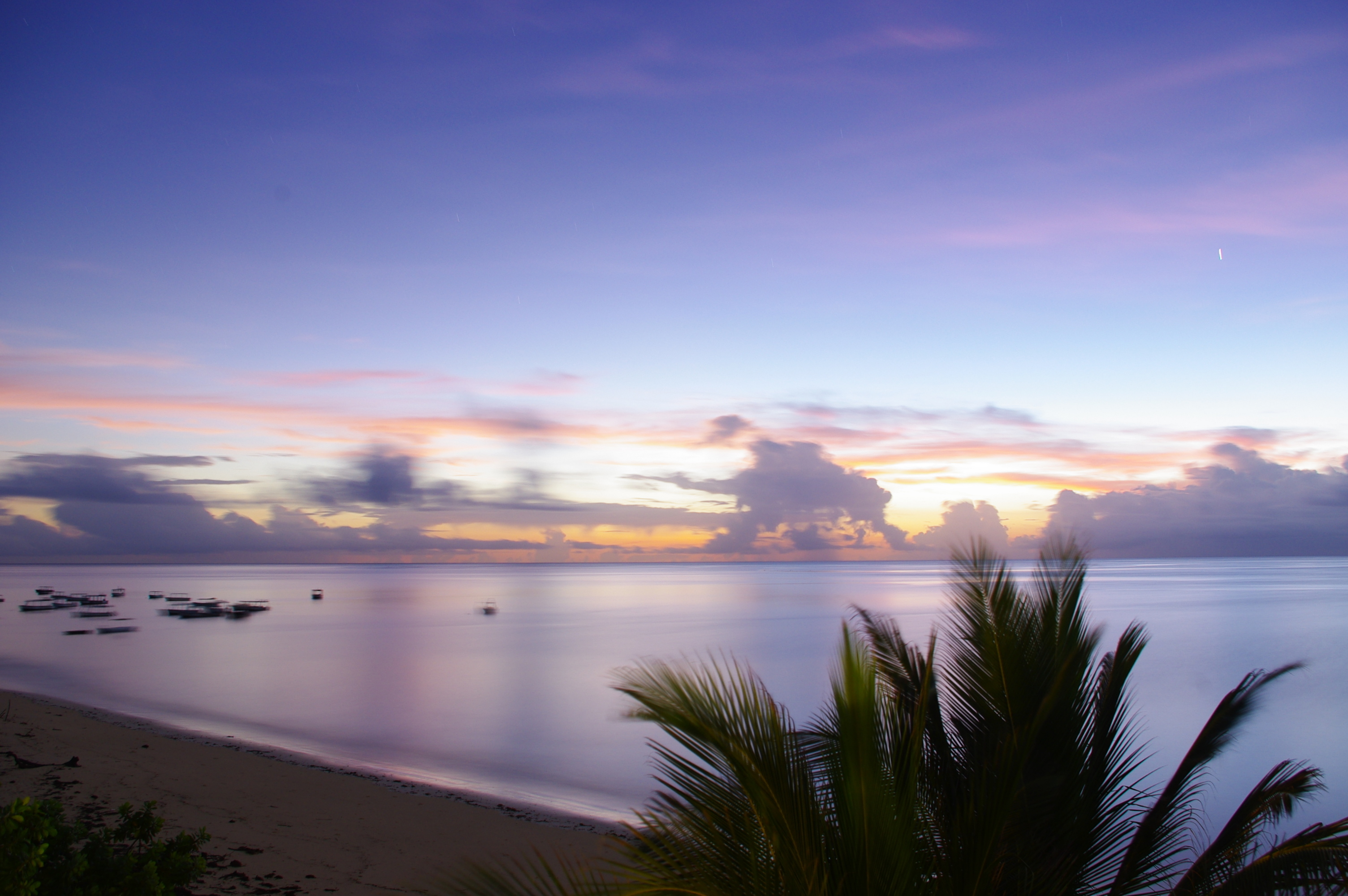
Sun rises over the Indian Ocean at Malindi

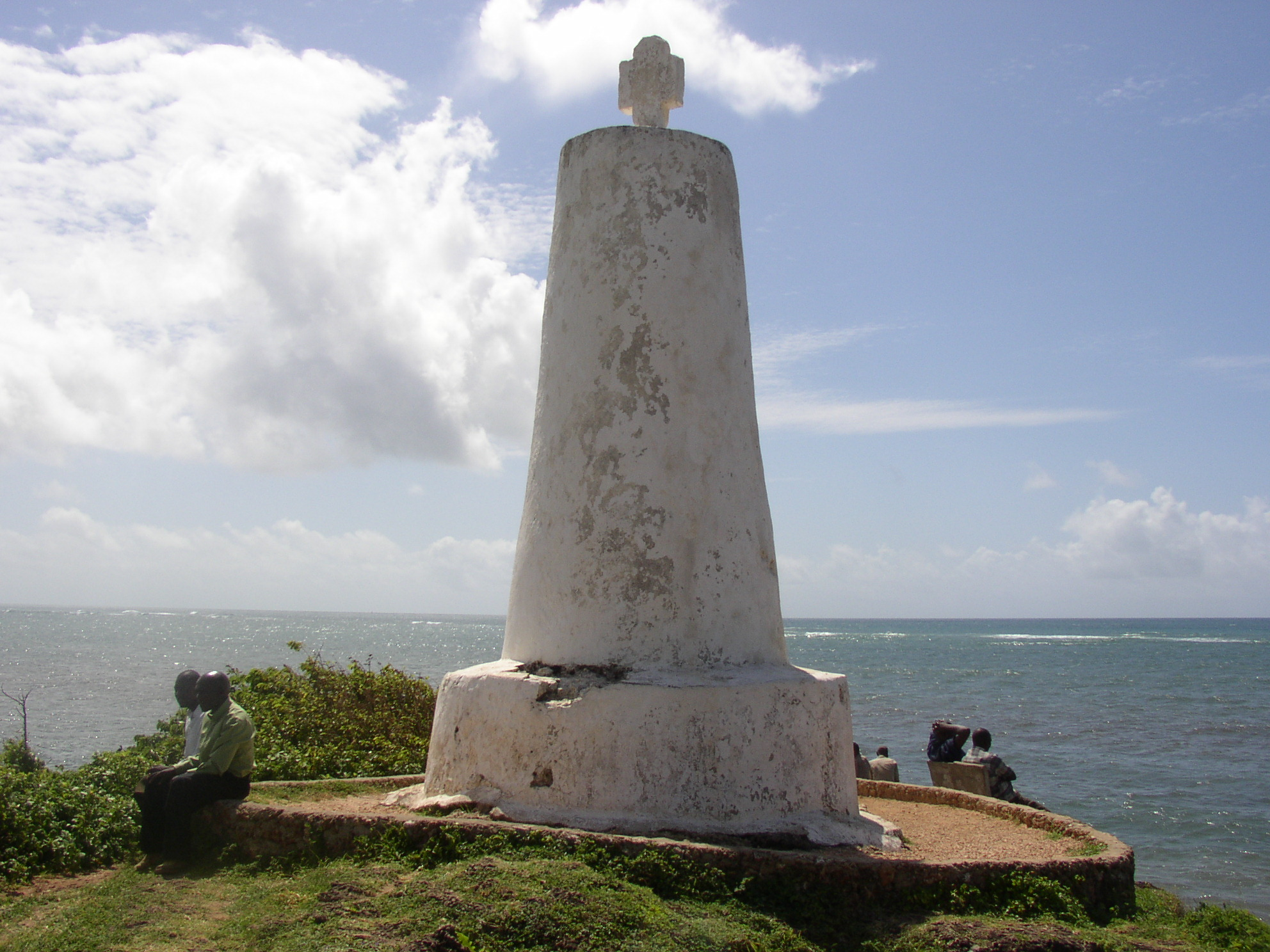
Vasco da Gama Pillar in Malindi

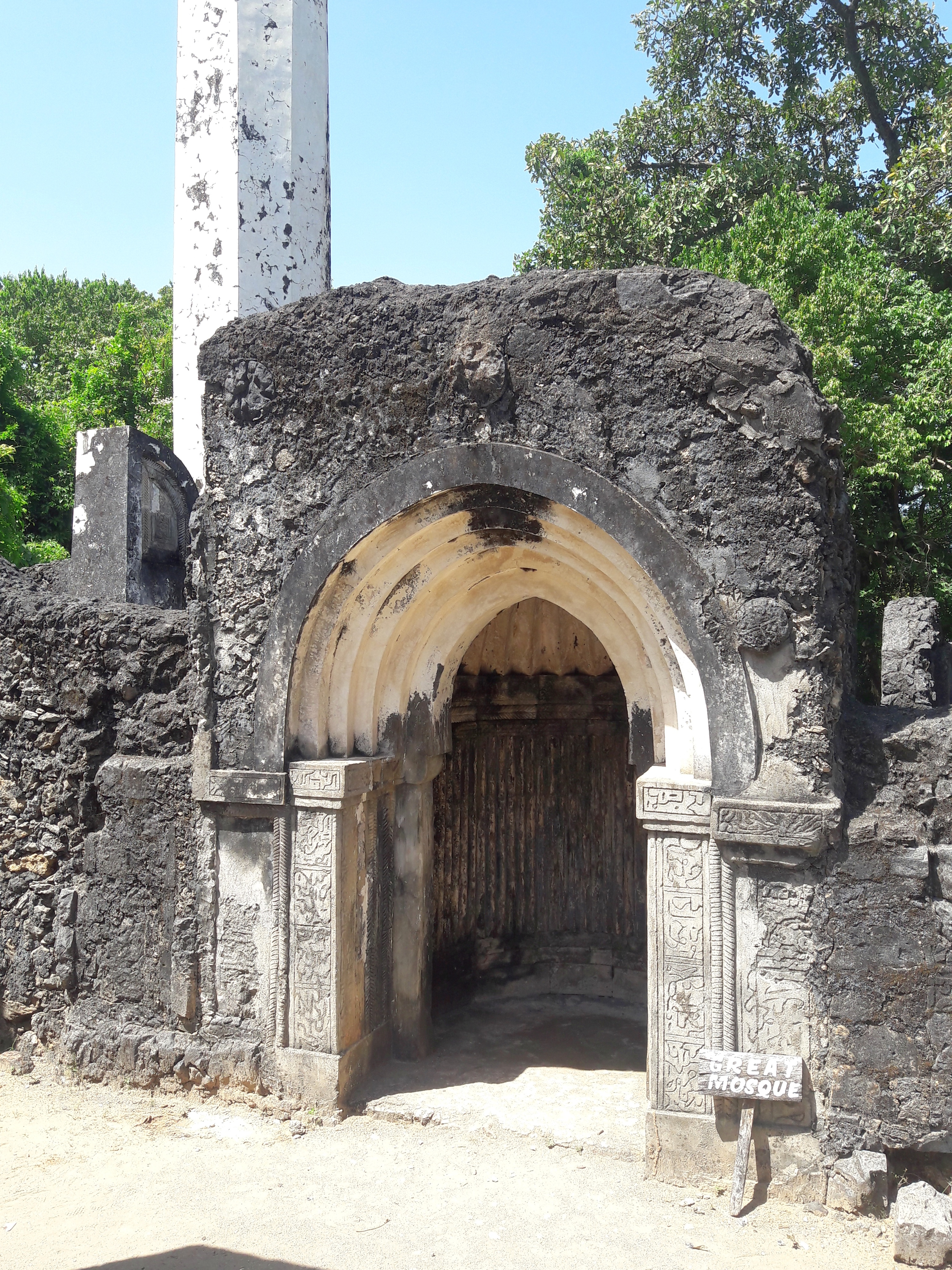
Mnarani ruins

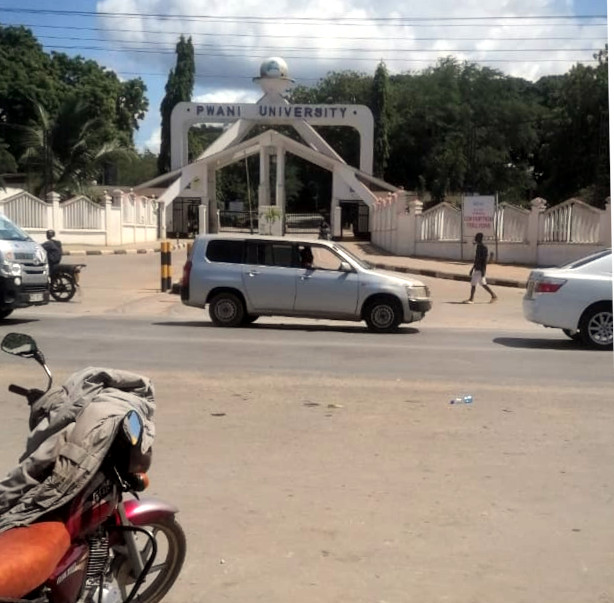
Kilifi University

== In popular culture ==
- The final scenes of the 1992 feature film “Nel continente nero” (“On the Black Continent”) by director Marco Rizi take place in Kilifi County, among the ruins of Gedi.
- The novel “MALI D’AFRICA” (by Sara Cardelli) describes an impossible love in Malindi.
- Most of the events in the novel “Невозвращенец” (“The Non-Returnee”) by Andrei Gusev take place in Kilifi County and in Kilifi itself. The novel describes several years of life in Kilifi County, in the suburbs of Malindi in the early 2020s of the Russian writer Andy and his wife Jennifer, who was born in Kenya.

== Villages and settlements ==
- Banda Ra Salama
- Bibitoli
- Bukatwavi
- Bara Hoyo
- Belewa
- Buji Albati
- Chakama
- Chonyi
- Chonye
- Dakacha
- Dakawachu
- Dindiri
- Dulukiza
- Dzitsuhe
- Fundi Isa
- Jarabuni
- Luswani
- Malindi
- Ushingo
- Vipingo
- Waresa
- Watamu
- Ganda
- Kwaupanga
- Girigi
- Pendukiani
- Mere
- Mshongoleni
- Mikomani
- Kararacha
- Matsanjeni
- Bora upanga
- Roka Maweni
- Kavure ngopo
- Bundacho
- Fimboni
- Swere

== See also ==
- Mombasa County
- Kwale County
- Tana River County
- Lamu County
- Taita-Taveta County
