= Gideon Mung'aro =

Governor of Kilifi County

Maitha Gideon Mung'aro

Governor of Kilifi County
- Incumbent
- Assumed office August 2022
- Preceded by: Amason Kingi

Member of the National Assembly for Kilifi North Constituency
- In office 2013–2017
- Preceded by: Position established
- Succeeded by: Owen Baya

Member of the National Assembly for Malindi Constituency
- Succeeded by: Position abolished

Mayor of Malindi

Personal details
- Born: Kenya
- Party: Orange Democratic Movement
- Other political affiliations: Coalition for Reforms and Democracy
- Profession: Politician

Maitha Gideon Mung'aro is a Kenyan politician who has served as the governor of Kilifi County since August 2022. As a member of the Coalition for Reforms and Democracy and the Orange Democratic Movement, he was elected to represent Kilifi North Constituency in the National Assembly in the 2013 parliamentary election. He was the chairman of the African Union Parliamentary Group. He was also the chief whip, succeeding Jakoyo Midiwo. He was a member of the Parliamentary House Business Committee (Housekeeping), Committee on Selection (Housekeeping) and the Lands Committee (Departmental). He is also a former mayor of Malindi and represented Malindi Constituency in parliament before it was split.
