= Watamu =

Town in Kilifi County, Kenya

Coordinates: 3°21′S 40°01′E

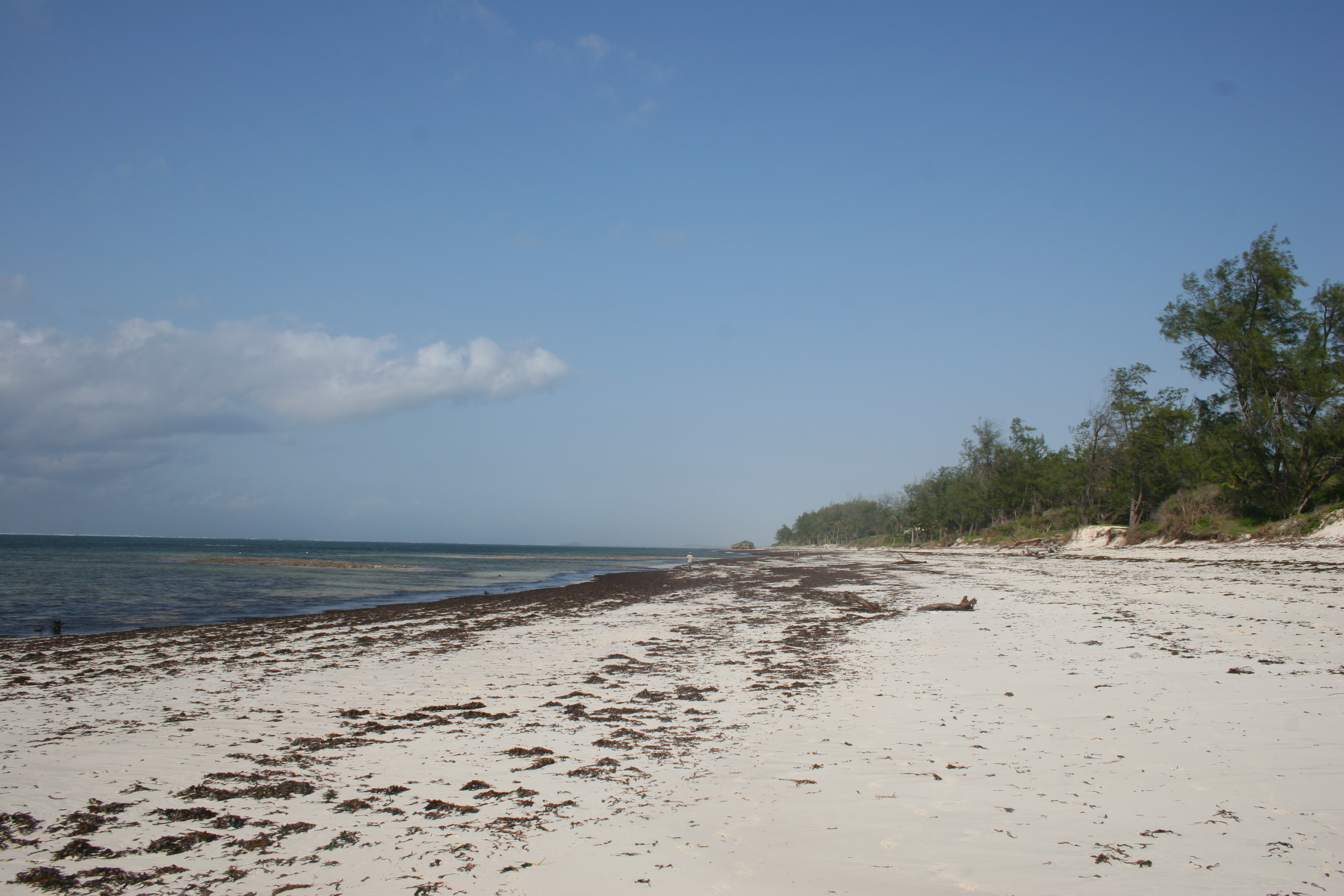
Watamu Beach

Watamu is a small town located approximately 105 km north of Mombasa and about 15 km south of Malindi on the Indian Ocean coast of Kenya. It lies on a small headland, between the Blue Lagoon and Watamu Bay. Its main economic activities are tourism and fishing. The town had a population of around 30,000 in 2020 and it is part of Kilifi County.

== Overview ==
The shoreline in the area features white sand beaches and offshore coral formations arranged in different bays and beaches: Garoda Beach, Turtle Bay, Blue Lagoon Bay, Watamu Bay, Ocean Breeze, Kanani reef, and Jacaranda beach. They are protected as part of the Watamu Marine National Park. The Marine Park is considered one of the best snorkeling and diving areas on the coast of East Africa. In order to assist the managing authorities namely the Kenyan Wildlife Service, in protecting the Park, local community groups, the tourism sector and environmental groups have formed a unique organisation Watamu Marine Association. Members of this group are Turtle Bay, Hemingways, Ocean Sports, Arocha Kenya, Lonno Lodge, Mida Community Conservation group, Watamu Boat Operators, Safari Sellers and women's group. The ruins of Gedi (also known as Gede) are located near Watamu.

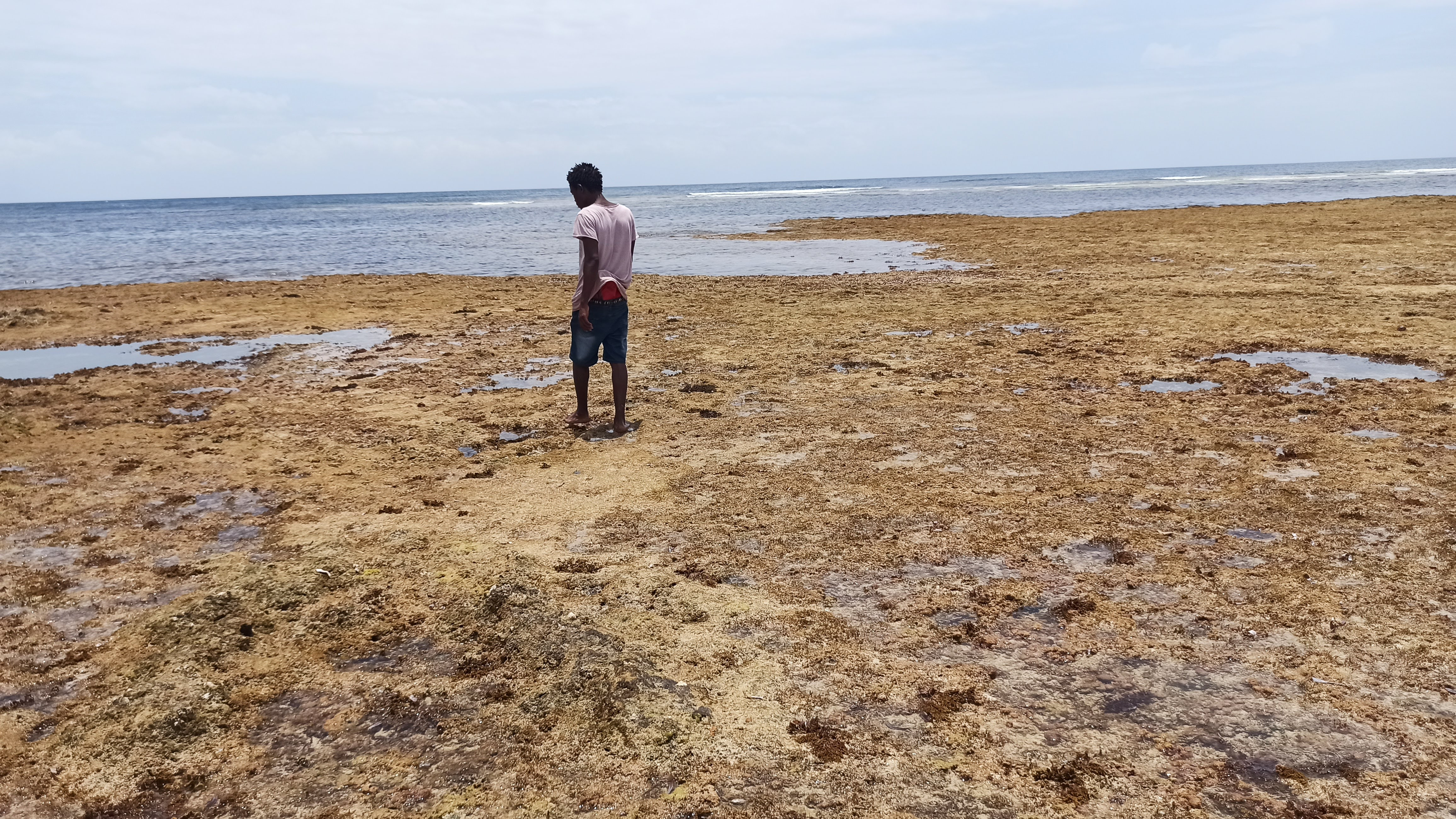

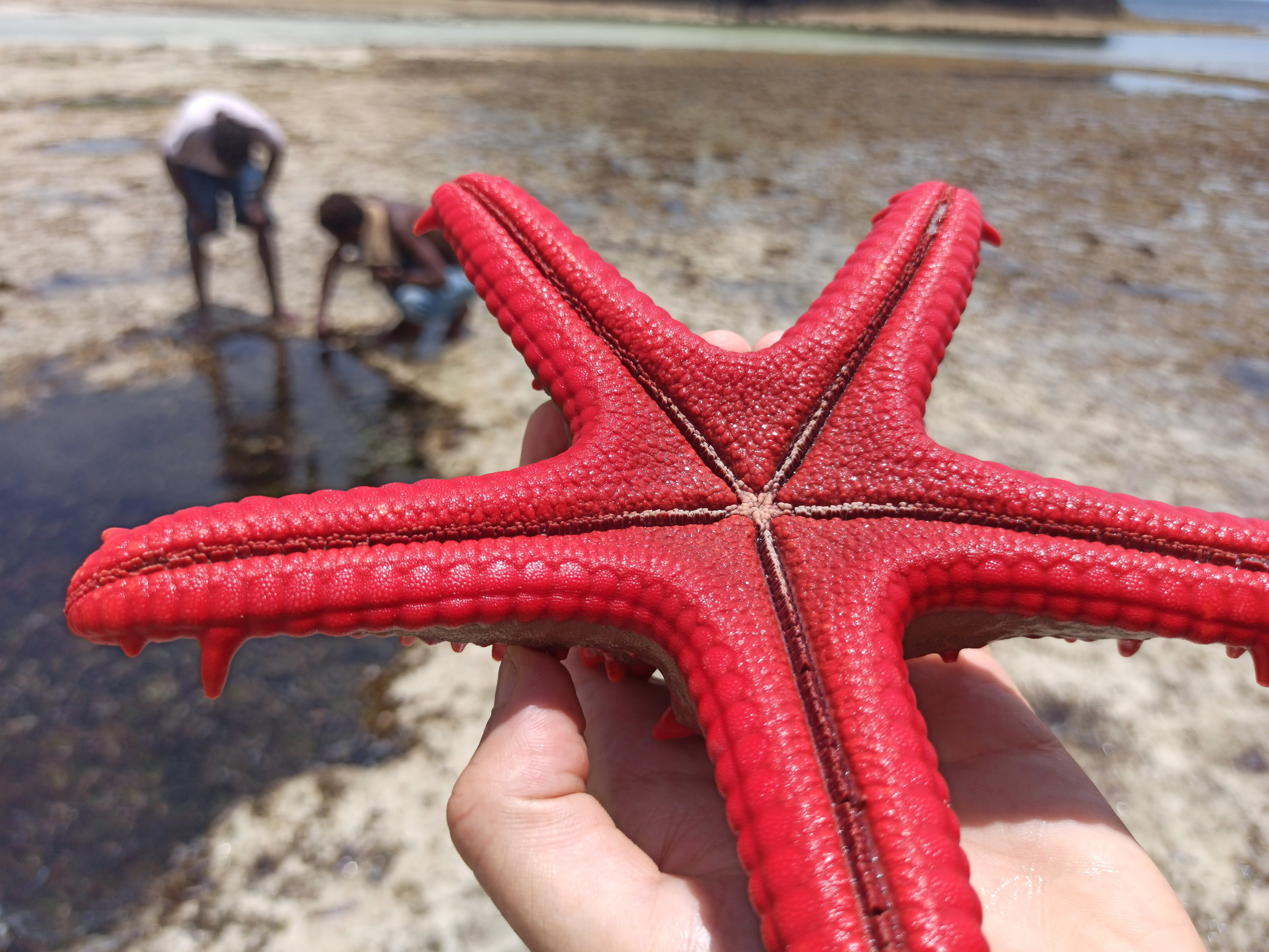

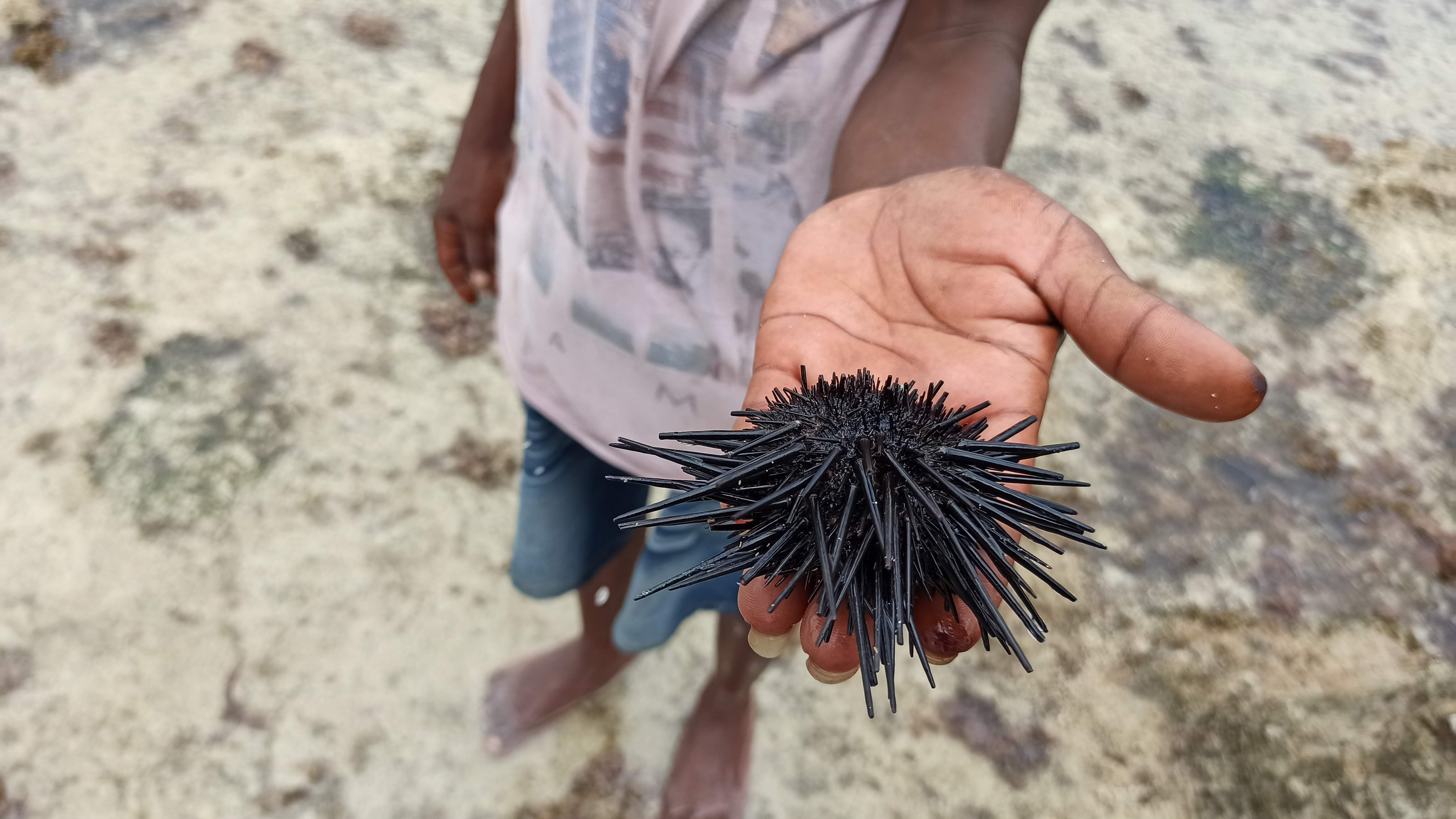

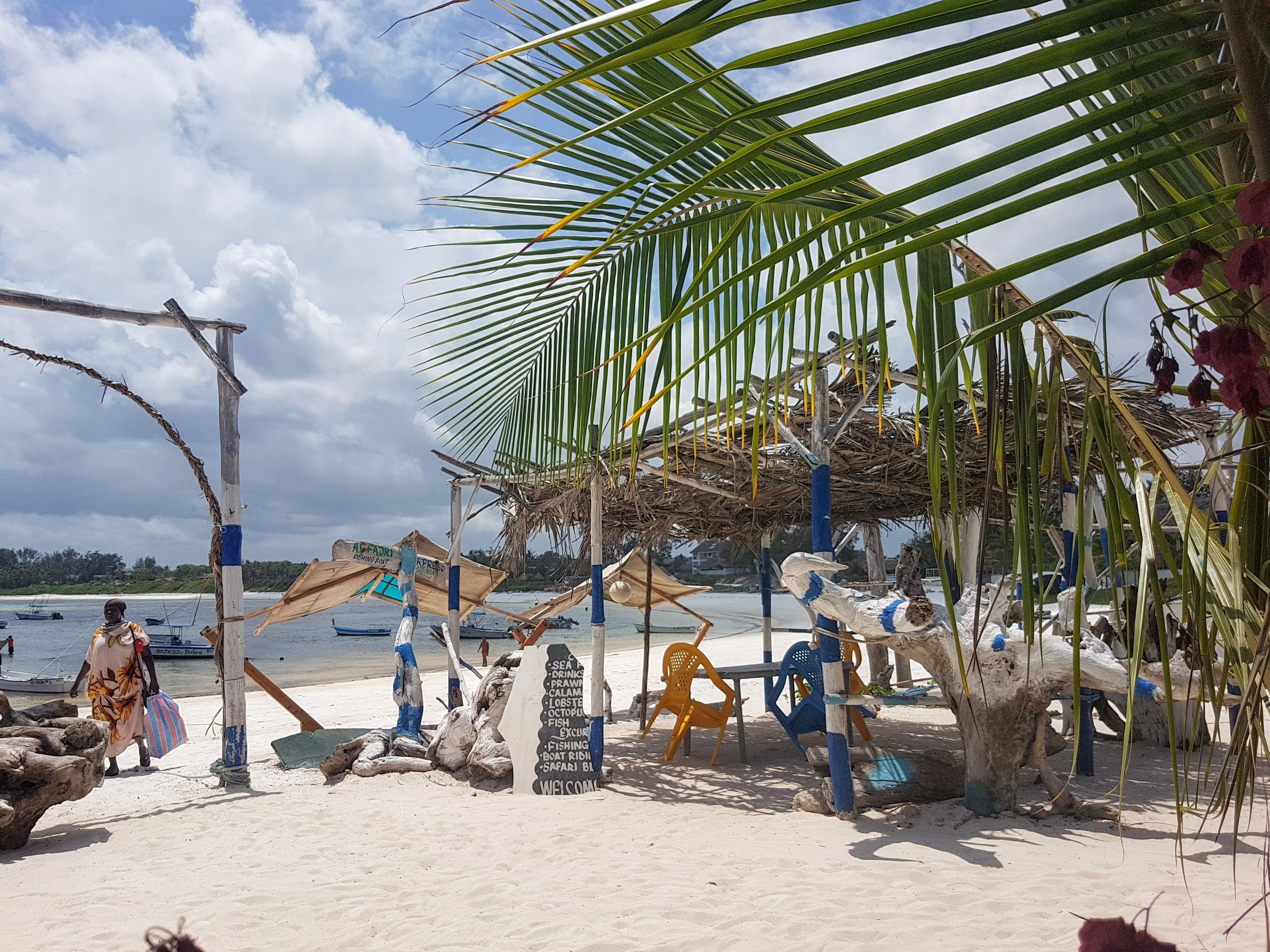

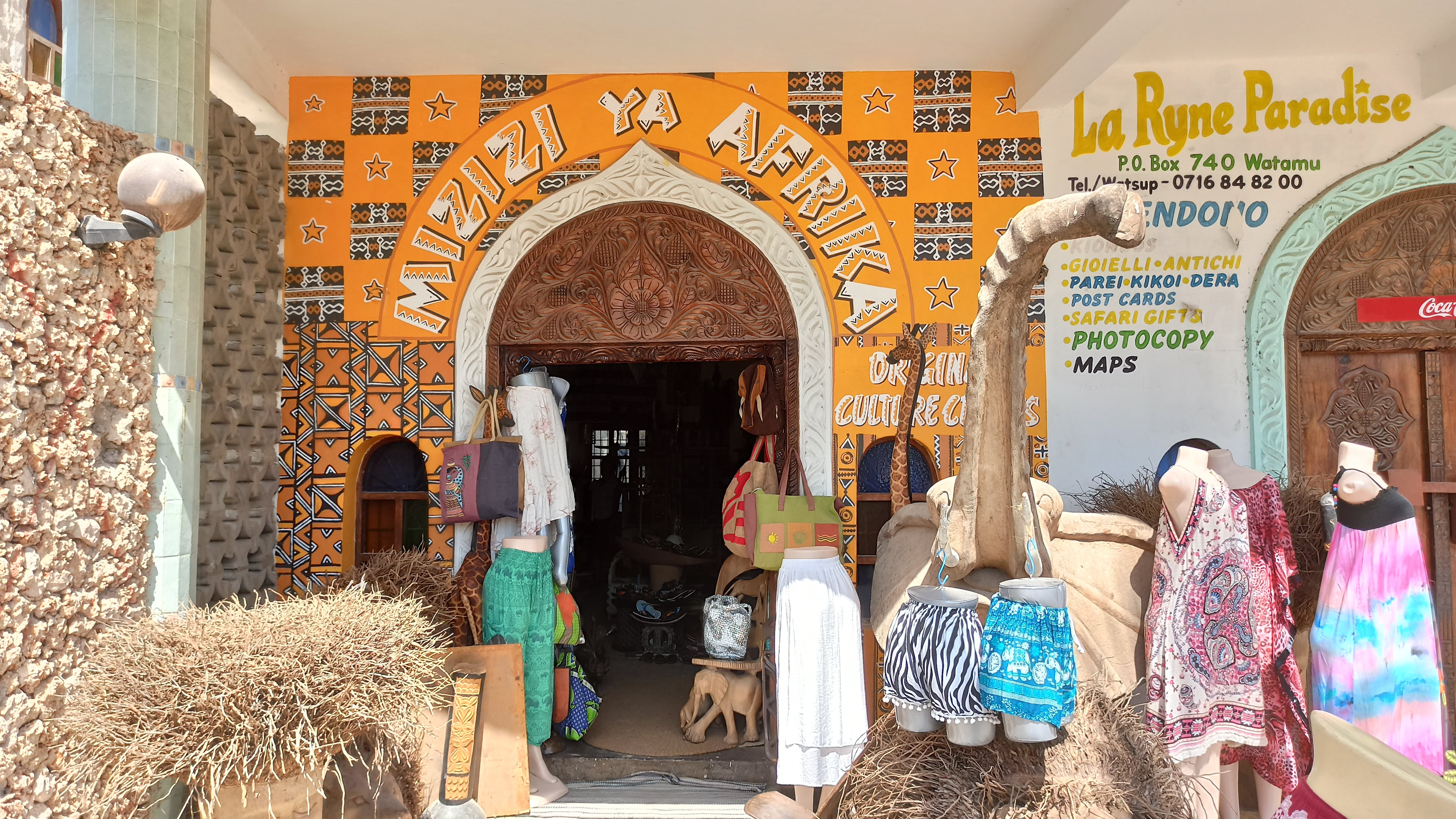

== People of Watamu ==
According to archaeological findings, Watamu has been inhabited since the 13th century. Watamu is home to the Bajuni people, who trace their origins to intermarriage between the local Giriama People and Arab traders. Various tribes from inland Kenya such as the Luo, Kisii, Kikuyu, Kamba, Kalenjin, and Luhyas have migrated to the area to work in the hotel industry. Notable people include:

- Masha Mapenzi, gospel singer.

== In popular culture ==
Masha Mapenzi's album which is titled Uhiko.

Part of the events in the novel "Our Wild Sex in Malindi" (by Andrei Gusev) takes place in Watamu. The novel describes a few years living in the Malindi's suburb of Russian writer Andy and his wife, Jennifer, who was born in Kenya.

== Natural environment ==
A newly discovered species of the largest spitting cobra in the world (Naja ashei) was recently (2007) discovered in Watamu.

== See also ==
- Historic Swahili Settlements
