= List of sites and monuments in Kenya =

This is a list of sites and monuments of historic value that are maintained by the National Museums of Kenya.

== Historic sites ==
Monument wmke-identifier	Description	Date in gazette as monument	Original function	Built	County	Location	Address	Comment	Coordinates	Image
1	Mnarani ruins	1929			Kilifi County	Kilifi			3°37′52″S 39°51′01″E	Upload Photo
2	Mtwapa	1935			Kilifi County	Kilifi			3°56′45″S 39°44′39″E	Upload Photo
3	Mambrui	1935			Kilifi County	Kilifi			3°05′34″S 40°09′01″E	Upload Photo
4	Redoubt	1935			Mombasa County	Mombasa				Upload Photo
5	Shirazi	1935			Kwale County	Kwale			4°31′28″S 39°25′02″E	Upload Photo
6	Selengai Stone	1935			Kajiado County	Kajiado				Upload Photo
7	Selengai wells	1935			Kwale County	Kwale				Upload Photo
8	Tumbe	1935			Kwale County	Kwale				Upload Photo
9	Takaungu south	1935			Kilifi County	Takaungu			3°40′52″S 39°51′21″E	Upload Photo
10	Trumpet metal	1935			Mombasa County					Upload Photo
11	Trumpet ivory	1935			Mombasa County					Upload Photo
12	Vasco da Gama pillar	1935			Kilifi County	Malindi			3°11′33″S 40°07′43″E	
13	Old watch towers	1935			Mombasa County					Upload Photo
14	Tiwi	1935			Kwale County	Kwale			4°14′23″S 39°34′30″E	Upload Photo
15	Kilepwa island	1954			Kilifi County	Kilifi				Upload Photo
16	Kariandusi	1954			Nakuru County	Nakuru			0°27′24″S 36°17′00″E	Upload Photo
17	Jamadra mosque	1956			Kilifi County	Malindi				Upload Photo
18	Sheikh Said	1956			Kilifi County	Kilifi				Upload Photo
19	Sheikh Othman	1956			Kilifi County	Malindi				Upload Photo
20	Manda town ruins	1956			Lamu County	Manda Island			2°18′25″S 40°55′28″E	Upload Photo
21	Jumaa mosque	1958			Mombasa County					Upload Photo
22	Luziwa	1958			Mombasa County					Upload Photo
23	Mambore	1958			Lamu County	Lamu				Upload Photo
24	Riadha uwani	1958			Mombasa County	Mombasa				Upload Photo
25	Siyu	1958			Lamu County	Pate Island				
26	Takaungu north	1958			Kilifi County	Takaungu			3°40′54″S 39°51′21″E	Upload Photo
27	Jamia of Siyu	1958			Lamu County	Pate Island				Upload Photo
28	Lango la Shee of Siyu	1958			Lamu County	Pate Island				Upload Photo
29	Bwana shali patani	1958			Mombasa County					Upload Photo
30	Faza	1958			Mombasa County				2°03′16″S 41°06′33″E	Upload Photo
31	Jumaa Mtwapa	1958			Kilifi County	Kilifi				Upload Photo
32	Mwana	1958			Lamu County	Lamu			2°14′59″S 40°54′49″E	Upload Photo
33	Pillar tomb	1958			Mombasa County					Upload Photo
34	Mgangani	1959			Kilifi County	Kilifi				Upload Photo
35	Fort Jesus National Monument	1970			Mombasa County	Mombasa			4°03′44″S 39°40′47″E	
36	Gede Ruins National Monument	1970			Kilifi County	Kilifi				
37	Olorgesailie national monument	1970			Kajiado County	Kajiado				
38	Kenyatta house – Maralal	1977			Samburu County	Samburu				Upload Photo
39	Portuguese shipwreck	1977			Mombasa County	Mombasa				Upload Photo
40	Kilombe Archeological site	1980			Nakuru County	Nakuru				Upload Photo
41	Thimlich Ohinga	1981			Migori County	Kadem				
42	Lanet prehistoric site	1981			Nakuru County	Lanet				Upload Photo
43	Sibiloi National Park	1981			Marsabit County	Marsabit			3°57′38″N 36°20′33″E	
44	Mai Mahiu Catholic Church (Italian church) a.k.a. Travelers Church			1942	Nakuru County	Mai Mahiu				
45	Fort Ternan Palaeo site	1981			Kericho County	Fort Ternan				Upload Photo
46	Songhor palaeo	1981			Kisumu County	Muhoroni				Upload Photo
47	Muguruk Archeological site	1981			Kisumu County	East of Muguruk River				Upload Photo
48	Kapurtay prehistoric site	1981			Nandi County	South Aintomotua river				Upload Photo
49	Muhanda fort	1981			Bungoma County	Bungoma				Upload Photo
50	Kijabe church	1981			Kiambu County	Kiambu				Upload Photo
51	Chetambe's fort	1981			Bungoma County	Bungoma				Upload Photo
52	Kanam Prehistoric site	1982			Homa Bay County	Homa Bay				Upload Photo
53	Kanjera Prehistoric site	1982			Homa Bay County	close to Mount Homa				Upload Photo
54	Jumba La Mtwana Ruins	1982			Lamu County	Lamu				Upload Photo
55	Takwa Milinga Ruins	1982			Kilifi County	Kilifi				
56	Pate Ruins	1982			Lamu County	Lamu				Upload Photo
57	Brooks quarry prehistorics site	1982			Lamu County	Manda Island				Upload Photo
58	Chemogoch prehistoric site	1982			Kisumu County	East of Muhoroni				Upload Photo
59	Bwana Bakari mosque	1982			Lamu County	Pate Island				Upload Photo
60	Bwana Tamu	1982			Mombasa County					Upload Photo
61	Kongo mosque	1983			Kwale County	Kwale				Upload Photo
62	Shaka ruins	1983			Tana River County	Tana River				Upload Photo
63	Kwa wanawali saba	1983			Tana River County	Tana River				Upload Photo
64	Kwa ungwana wa mashaa	1983			Tana River County	Tana River				Upload Photo
65	Ishakani III	1983			Lamu County	Lamu				Upload Photo
66	Ishakani II	1983			Lamu County	Lamu				Upload Photo
67	Ishakani I	1983			Lamu County	Lamu				Upload Photo
68	Kisauni bell tower	1983			Mombasa County	Kisauni				Upload Photo
69	Shanga, Pate Island	1983			Lamu County	Lamu				Upload Photo
70	Mbaraki pillar	1983			Mombasa County	Mombasa				Upload Photo
71	Omwe	1983			Lamu County	Lamu				Upload Photo
72	Kiunga	1983			Lamu County	Lamu				Upload Photo
73	Diani ruins	1983			Kwale County	Kwale				
74	Lamu Fort	1984			Lamu County	Lamu				
75	Old law courts	1985			Mombasa County	Mombasa				
76	Historic lamu town	1986			Lamu County	Lamu				Upload Photo
77	Historic old town, MSA	1990			Mombasa County	Mombasa				
78	DO's office Malindi	1991			Kilifi County	Malindi				Upload Photo
79	Mama Ngina drive	1991			Mombasa County	Mombasa				
80	Kaya Diani	1992			Kwale County	Kwale				Upload Photo
81	Kaya muhaka	1992			Kwale County	Kwale				Upload Photo
82	Kaya Galu(Ganzoni)	1992			Kwale County	Kwale				Upload Photo
83	Kaya kinondo	1992			Kwale County	Kwale				Upload Photo
84	Chale island sacred grove	1992			Kwale County	Kwale				Upload Photo
85	Shimoni cave	1992			Kwale County	Kwale				Upload Photo
86	Kaya bogowa	1992			Kwale County	Kwale				Upload Photo
87	Kaya gandini	1992			Kwale County	Kwale				Upload Photo
88	Kaya mtai	1992			Kwale County	Kwale				Upload Photo
89	Dugumura hill sacred grove	1992			Kwale County	Kwale				Upload Photo
90	Kaya kwale	1992			Kwale County	Kwale				Upload Photo
91	Kaya Dzombo	1992			Kwale County	Kwale				Upload Photo
92	Mrima hill sacred grove	1992			Kwale County	Kwale				Upload Photo
93	Kaya Ukunda	1992			Kwale County	Kwale				Upload Photo
94	Hyrax Hill Prehistoric Site and Museum	1995			Nakuru County	Nakuru				
95	Kaya fungo	1996			Kilifi County	Fungo				Upload Photo
96	Kaya kauma	1996			Kilifi County	Kauma				Upload Photo
97	Kaya chivara	1996			Kilifi County	Kauma				Upload Photo
98	Leven House	1996			Mombasa County	Mombasa				
99	Lord Egerton Castle	1996			Nakuru County	Ngata Farm				Upload Photo
100	Mombasa golf club	1997			Mombasa County	Mombasa				Upload Photo
101	Kaya mtswakara	1997			Kwale County	Kasemeni				Upload Photo
102	Castle Hotel	1997			Mombasa County	Mombasa				
103	Holy ghost cathedral	1997			Mombasa County	Mombasa				
104	City park	1997			Nairobi County	Nairobi				Upload Photo
105	St Emmanuel Church, Frere Town	1997			Mombasa County	Nyali				Upload Photo
106	Kericho Wagon Works Ltd	1997			Kericho County	Kericho				Upload Photo
107	Kaya Mstwakara	1997			Kwale County	Kasemeni				Upload Photo
108	Babu Motors	1997			Mombasa County	Mombasa				Upload Photo
109	Kilindini House	1997			Mombasa County	Mombasa				Upload Photo
110	Ivory House	1997			Mombasa County	Mombasa				Upload Photo
111	Issa Thawar House	1997			Mombasa County	Mombasa				Upload Photo
112	MSA Hospital Dispensary	1997			Mombasa County	Mombasa				Upload Photo
113	Central Police Station	1997			Mombasa County	Mombasa				Upload Photo
114	District Officer's Office, Mombasa	1997			Mombasa County	Mombasa				Upload Photo
115	Anglican Cathedral	1997			Mombasa County	Mombasa				
116	Mackinnon Market	1997			Mombasa County	Mombasa				
117	Alidina Visram School	1997			Mombasa County	Mombasa				Upload Photo
118	Grindlay's Bank Intn'l	1997			Mombasa County	Mombasa				Upload Photo
119	National Bank of Kenya	1997			Mombasa County	Mombasa				Upload Photo
120	Fort hall	1998			Muranga County	Murang'a				
121	Mukurwe wa Nyagathanga	1998			Muranga County	Gakuyu				Upload Photo
122	Kaya Mudzi Muvya	1998			Kilifi County	Rabai				Upload Photo
123	Kaya Lunguma	1998			Kilifi County	Golini				Upload Photo
124	Sheikh Mwinyime Shrine	1998			Mombasa County	Mombasa				Upload Photo
125	Former Parklands Railways Staff	1998			Nairobi County	Parklands				Upload Photo
126	Kaya Choni	1998			Kwale County	Gandini				Upload Photo
127	Muyu wa Kae, Swahili settlement	1999			Kilifi County	Marereni				Upload Photo
128	Kaya Boumu/Fimboni	1999			Kilifi County	Mwawesa				Upload Photo
129	Kaya Mzizima	1999			Kilifi County	Mwawesa				Upload Photo
130	The First District Commissioner's	2000			Machakos County	Machakos				Upload Photo
131	Jeevanjee Gardens	2000			Nairobi County	Nairobi				Upload Photo
132	Ronald Ngala's Tombstone	2000			Kilifi County	Kaloleni				Upload Photo
133	Old St. Marks A.C.K. Sagala	2000			Taita Taveta County	Sagala				Upload Photo
134	Jaramogi Oginga Odinga	2000			Kisii County	Nyamira			0°06′43″S 34°13′48″E	Upload Photo
135	The Galton-Fenzi Memorial	2000		1939	Nairobi County	Nairobi			1°17′09″S 36°49′11″E	
136	St. Paul's Church (A.C.K)	2000			Kiambu County	Kikuyu				Upload Photo
137	The War Memorial Statue	2000			Nairobi County	Nairobi				Upload Photo
138	Lamu District Veterinary Office	2000			Lamu County	Lamu				Upload Photo
139	Government Rest House-Sori	2001			Homa Bay County	Karungu				Upload Photo
140	The Old SDA Church – Rapedhi	2001			Homa Bay County	Kanyidoto				Upload Photo
141	Muliro Gardens	2001			Kakamega County	Kakamega				Upload Photo
142	Institute of African Studies – Chiromo	2001			Nairobi County	Chiromo campus, University of Nairobi				Upload Photo
143	Nyeri Provincial Police	2001			Nyeri County	Nyeri				Upload Photo
144	Nyeri Club	2001			Nyeri County					Upload Photo
145	White Rhino Hotel, Nyeri	2001			Nyeri County					Upload Photo
146	Tumutumu P.C.E.A Church, Nyeri	2001			Nyeri County	Konyu				Upload Photo
147	P.C.E.A. Tumu Tumu Secretary's	2001			Nyeri County					Upload Photo
148	Macalder Mines	2001			Migori County	South East Kadem				Upload Photo
149	Old Provincial Commissioner's	2001			Kisumu County					Upload Photo
150	Mau Mau Mass Grave	2001			Nyeri County					Upload Photo
151	Mau-Mau Cave	2001			Nyeri County				0°18′40″S 36°57′46″E	
152	African Retail Trade Stores	2001			Nyeri County	Lumumba Street				Upload Photo
153	New District Comminsioner's	2001			Nyeri County					Upload Photo
154	Nyeri Old Clock Tower	2001			Nyeri County					Upload Photo
155	Nyeri Court	2001			Nyeri County					Upload Photo
156	Riringu Police Station	2001			Nyeri County					Upload Photo
157	Ruringu Old African Court	2001			Nyeri County					Upload Photo
158	The Baden Powell Grave	2001			Nyeri County	Nyeri			0°25′09″S 36°57′00″E	
159	Pax-Tu Building	2001			Nyeri County					Upload Photo
160	St. Peter's Anglican Church, Nyeri	2001			Nyeri County					Upload Photo
161	St. Cuthbert's P.C.E.A. Church	2001			Nyeri County					Upload Photo
162	Mathari Catholic Mission Church	2001			Nyeri County					Upload Photo
163	Italian Memorial Church, Nyeri	2001			Nyeri County					Upload Photo
164	Italian Servants' Wall Monument	2001			Nyeri County					Upload Photo
165	Queen Elizabeth Monument	2001			Nyeri County					Upload Photo
166	Dedan Kimathi's Trench (Kahigani)	2001			Nyeri County					
167	Mau Mau Fig Tree	2001								Upload Photo
168	District Commissioner's Office	2001			Kisumu County					Upload Photo
169	Kisumu Police Headquarters	2001			Kisumu County	Kisumu				Upload Photo
170	Brandman's House	2001			Kisumu County					Upload Photo
171	A.I.C. Kijabe Church Ruins	2001			Kiambu County	Kijabe				Upload Photo
172	Nairobi School	2001			Nairobi County	Westlands				Upload Photo
173	Khoja Mosque	2001			Nairobi County					
174	Old Mutual Building	2001			Nairobi County	Nairobi CBD				
175	Standard Chartered Building	2001			Nairobi County	Nairobi CBD				
176	Pan Africa House	2001			Nairobi County	Nairobi CBD				
177	Royalty House	2001			Nairobi County					Upload Photo
178	Imperial Chambers	2001			Nairobi County					
179	Imperial British East African	2001			Nairobi County					Upload Photo
180	Bull Cafe	2001			Nairobi County					Upload Photo
181	Prembro House	2001			Nairobi County					Upload Photo
182	Pansoms Building	2001			Nairobi County					Upload Photo
183	Surat District Association Building	2001			Nairobi County					Upload Photo
184	Rahimtulla Trust Library	2001			Nairobi County					
185	Bohra Mosque	2001			Nairobi County					Upload Photo
186	Tom Mboya Mausoleum	2001			Homa Bay County	Rusinga Island				Upload Photo
187	Karima Hill	2001			Nyeri County					Upload Photo
188	Bedida Sacred Grove	2002			Kilifi County					Upload Photo
189	Lamu Water Catchment Area	2002			Lamu County	Mwawesa				Upload Photo
190	Burguret Mau Mau Shelter	2003			Nyeri County	Gakawa				Upload Photo
191	Naromoru Mau Mau Cave	2003			Nyeri County					Upload Photo
192	Thaai Sacred Lake	2003			Meru County	Kibirichia				Upload Photo
193	Nkunga Sacred Lake	2003			Meru County	Nkunga				Upload Photo
194	Bututia Sacred Lake	2003			Meru County	Kianjai				Upload Photo
195	Gitune Sacred Forest	2003			Meru County	Gatimbi				Upload Photo
196	Ras mtandanda mosque				Mombasa County					Upload Photo
197	Shatin Tomb									Upload Photo
198	Blixen House				Nairobi County	Karen				
199	10-year Nyayo era				Nairobi County	Nairobi				
200	City hall				Nairobi County	Nairobi				
201	Peace pole				Nairobi County	Nairobi				
202	Global forest				Nairobi County	Nairobi				
203	Jomo Kenyatta				Nairobi County	Nairobi	Located at the Kenyatta International Conference Center compound in Nairobi			
204	Silver jubilee monument				Nairobi County	Nairobi	Located at Uhuru gardens along Lang'ata road just past the Carnivore hotel.			
205	Peace, Love and Unity monument				Nairobi County	Nairobi	Located at Uhuru park min Nairobi			
206	The Judiciary building				Nairobi County	Nairobi				
207	The National monument				Nairobi County	Nairobi	Located at Uhuru gardens along Lang'ata road just past the Carnivore hotel.			
208	The tetrahedron				Nairobi County	Nairobi	located at Uhuru park in Nairobi			

== See also ==
- List of museums in Kenya
