= Kaya (Mijikenda) =

Forest sacred to the Mijikenda people

Sacred Mijikenda Kaya Forests
UNESCO World Heritage Site
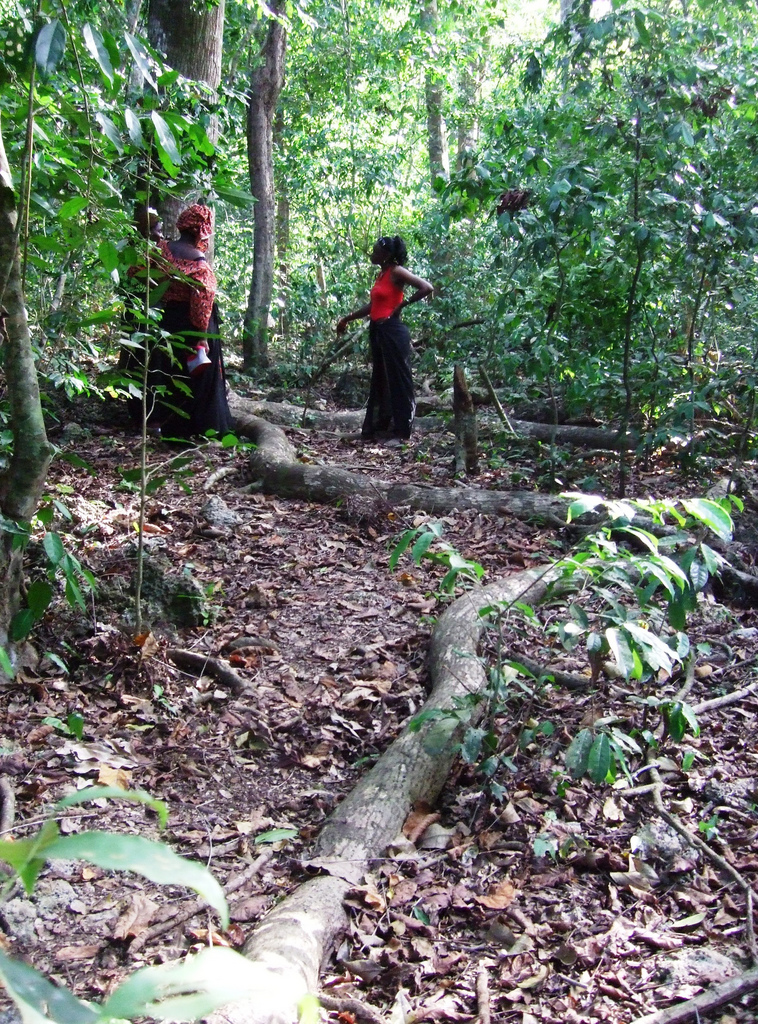

- Location within Kenya
- Location: Coast Province, Kenya
- Includes: Kaya Giriama Kaya Jibana Kaya Kambe Kaya Kauma Kaya Ribe The Rabai Kayas The Duruma Kayas Kaya Kinondo Kaya Chonyi
- Criteria: Cultural: (iii)(v)(vi)
- Reference: 1231rev
- Inscription: 2008 (32nd Session)
- Area: 1,538 ha (3,800 acres)
- Coordinates: 3°55′55″S 39°35′46″E

A kaya (plural makaya or kayas) is a sacred site of the Mijikenda people in the former Coast Province of Kenya. Often located within sacred forests, a kaya is considered to be an intrinsic source of ritual power and the origin of cultural identity; it is also a place of prayer for members of the Mijikenda ethnic group. The settlement, ritual centre, and fortified enclosure associated with the forest are also part of the kaya. This ecozone is thought to be the only living example of what the ecosystem was like during the early settlement period of the East African coast. In the present day, the kaya is also referred to as a traditional organizational unit of the Mijikenda. Eleven of the approximately 60 separate makaya have been grouped together and inscribed as the Sacred Mijikenda Kaya Forests, a UNESCO World Heritage Site.

== Geography ==
More than 50 makaya have been identified within the Kwale, Mombasa, and Kilifi counties. In fact, the National Museums of Kenya have identified 60 unique makaya since the early 1990s. They measure between 30 and 300 hectares (74 and 741 acres) each. These are scattered over what remains of the Mosaic Eastern Arc Mountain forest ecoregion, which spreads for 900 kilometres (560 mi) from Mozambique to Somalia. Still, they are concentrated within a hinterland stretch of 200 kilometres (120 mi) in the southern coastal plains area of Kenya, between the towns of Mombasa and Kilifi. While visitors are not allowed to enter most makaya, Kaya Kinondo, a 30-hectare forest on Diani Beach, allows visitors and falls under the auspices of the Kaya Kinondo Ecotourism Project. There are specific rules that visitors must adhere to when visiting Kaya Kinondo, including a dress code, no disturbing of the natural flaura, no photography, no speaking too loudly, and no fondling one another.

Mijikenda is a word that refers specifically to the nine original sub-ethnic groups and their corresponding makaya settlements, including the A'Giriama, A'Kauma, A'Chonyi, A'Kambe, A'Dzihana, A'Rihe, A'Rahai, A'Duruma, and A'Digo. Other scholars distinguish these nine groups as simply the Giriama, Rabai, Chonyi, Kauma, Kambe, Jibana, Ribe, Duruma, and Digo. Furthermore, Miji- literally means villages and -Kenda means nine in Bantu languages. The Duruma and Digo makaya are distinctly southern settlements of the Mijikenda, separated from the other seven of the initial makaya.

Research supports the hypothesis that the initial kaya settlements tend to be concentrated in the somewhat constricted, eastern ridge-forest environments of the coast because of the presence of two river systems, the Rare and the Galana rivers, as well as fertile land for pastoralism and agriculture. But the ten initial makaya could also be concentrate in these areas largely due to the security it provided from the surrounding outsider settlements of the Swahili, the Waata, the Kwavi, and the Wasegeju. Initially, the Mijikenda peoples migrated to this coastal Kenya region in the late 16th century from their former Shungwaya homeland to the north. Ultimately, by the late nineteenth and early twentieth century, these ten initial settlements had been largely deserted by the Mijikenda peoples as they migrated to different regions and established succeeding makaya.

== History ==
Many makaya were originally fortified villages of various ethnic groups, including the Digo, Chonyi, Kambe, Duruma, Kauma, Ribe, Rabai, Jibana, and Giriama peoples. The villages have lowland tropical forest areas in their surrounds and were reached via paths through the forest. The forest flora was used solely for the collection of medicinal herbs. The practices of tree cutting, livestock grazing, and farmland clearing were not permitted within a kaya.

It is understood that the Mijikenda kaya settlements of the Kenyan coast were founded at the same time as the Swahili settlements, but more has been published about the Swahili compared to the Mijikenda. Additionally, some archaeologists believe that the makaya were established in this area beginning in the ninth century, possibly making them even older than the Swahili coastal settlements.

In the present day, intensive deforestation for agricultural use and logging necessitated declaring 38 kaya forest areas legally as national monuments. Local communities manage these areas.

== Wildlife and conservation ==
Wildlife in the Kaya Kinodao area has been identified which can be visited as part of ecotourism project. 187 species of plant, 48 species of bird, and 45 species of butterfly have been identified. Colobus monkeys and golden-rumped elephant shrews have also been reported.

Entry into the forest was dictated by the traditional rules set by a governing body called the ngambi formed by elderly members of the community. This governing body was primarily concerned with its management, conservation and utilization of the biological resources in adherence to the traditional beliefs about the sacredness of the forest. However, the creation of a central governing body has affected the role of the local elders.

An ecotourism project was launched in 2001 with funds provided by the Ford Foundation with the objective of generating income for the local people and encouraging ecotourism to help preserve the sacredness of the forests. Eleven Mijikenda makaya were grouped together and inscribed as the Sacred Mijikenda Kaya Forests, a World Heritage Site, in 2008 under criteria (iii), (v), and (vi).

The conservation of the makaya has been a difficult task for the modern day Mijikenda community and other locals, due to environmental threats and a lack of adequate preservation policy. One example of this is with the Kaya Mrima in Kwale, which was threatened by a Canadian mining firm that would surely cause irreparable damage to the site. Additionally, one of the inadequate conservation policies created is entitled the Antiquities and Monuments Act of 1983, which aimed to protect Kenyan heritage but falls short as it is open to interpretation. Still, organizations such as the Coastal Forest Conservation Unit, established by the National Museums of Kenya, have been working to conserve the makaya and garner awareness from the local community.

The Krapf Memorial Museum in Rabai created a Kaya replica so that non-Mijikenda visitors, who are not allowed to physically enter the makaya, would be able to engage with the historical site at a distance. But, the exhibit only lasted from 2001 to about 2003 because it was considered inauthentic.

== Archaeology ==
Archaeological studies such as that of Henry Mutoro's, published in 1987, have taken place at the makaya. Mutoro surveyed and excavated eight different makaya, including the Singwaya, Bate, Kambe, Mudzi Mwiru, Mudzi Mpya, Bomu, Fungo, and Dagamra. For each of these kaya, Mutoro and his team embarked using a closed traverse method in order to map its boundaries and several tools such as ranging poles, an alidade, a plane table, a plumb bob, a compass, and a thirty-meter tape. He was able to produce both contour maps, individual settlement maps, and maps that show the distribution of makaya across the region.

Excavation posed a difficult task for Mutoro and his team because remains are buried on the site and he feared that they would accidentally exhume the dead. For example, at the Singwaya site they planned to excavate the midden, also known as the dzala, but had to avoid the vikango, or kaya grave posts, by subdividing the area into small 1 x 1 meter squares.

== Culture ==
Fingo (protective talismans) are buried in the kaya and are cared for by kaya elders who protect the traditions of the Mijikenda. Mijikenda believe that they brought the fingo charms from their ancestral home of Shungwaya, a myth of origin. In the present day, many fingo are lost or stolen, considered to be objet d'art.

A kaya has a specific layout that is pretty generalizable according to scholars who study them. They are usually surrounded by a dense forest and have two pathways on either side leading to several wooden gates fortified with stone. The number of gates on these pathways varies from kaya to kaya. The fingo is displayed at the first gate on each pathway, on the right hand side. The more important and often older makaya had bigger ritual symbols called mafingo, which could be up to 2 meters in height. At the end of the pathways, there is a broad expanse with a moroni, a large house that resembles a dome, in the middle situated between a fig tree and a baobab tree, mugandi and muyu respectively.

There are many myths and beliefs narrated by the local women of the area which relate to the sacredness of these forests. It is the general belief that the forests are inhabited by spirits. Makaya are considered the resting place for the founders of Mijikenda peoples, called Korma or spirits. Some of them believe that cutting a tree with a machete could result in the machete rebounding and causing injury to the leg which could be healed only by offering cloth to village elders in a ceremony. It is also believed that food cooked using wood from these sacred forest could cause sickness, and also that a dwelling built with timber drawn from the forest would collapse. The conservation of the sacredness of the forest was aimed at preserving its darkness. Additionally, rain prayers, peace prayers, political stability prayers, and prayers for economic stability are all examples of ritual practices of the Mijikenda that occur at kayas, even in the present.
