= Mijikenda language =

Bantu language spoken in Kenya and Tanzania

Mijikenda
- Native to: Kenya, Tanzania
- Region: Mombasa and Kwale districts in Kenya; Muheza and Tanga districts in Tanzania
- Ethnicity: Mijikenda, Chonyi, Digo, Giryama, Jibana, Duruma, Kambe, Kauma, Ribe, Rabai
- Native speakers: 2.6 million (2019 census)
- Language family: Niger–Congo?: Atlantic–Congo; Volta-Congo; Benue–Congo; Bantoid; Southern Bantoid; Bantu; Northeast Bantu; Northeast Coast Bantu; Sabaki; Mijikenda

Language codes
- ISO 639-3: Variously: coh – Chonyi dig – Digo dug – Duruma nyf – Giryama seg – Segeju
- Glottolog: miji1238
- Guthrie code: E.72,73,731,732
- ELP: Segeju

Mijikenda is a Bantu dialect cluster spoken along the coast of East Africa, mostly in Kenya, where there are 2.6 million speakers (2019 census) but also in Tanzania, where there are 166,000 speakers. The name Mijikenda means "the nine settlements" or "the nine communities" and refers to the multiple language communities that make up the group. An older, derogatory term for the group is Nyika which refers to the "dry and bushy country" along the coast.

== Varieties ==
The New Updated Guthrie List from 2009 lists the following varieties and Guthrie codes as part of the Mijikenda cluster:

- E72 – North Mijikenda (Nyika)
  - E72a – Giryama [nyf]
  - E72b – Kauma
  - E73c – Chonyi [coh]
  - E73d – Duruma [dug]
  - E73e – Rabai
  - E73F – Jibana
  - E72G – Kambe
  - E72H – Ribe
- E73-732 – South Mijikenda
  - E73 – Digo [dig]
  - E731 – Segeju [seg]
  - E732 – Degere

The Degere are former hunter-gatherers like the Cushitic Waata, and are said to have once spoken a Cushitic language.

The Ethnologue lists the following variety groupings:

- [coh] – Chonyi, Jibana
- [dug] – Duruma
- [dig] – Digo
- [nyf] – Giryama, Ribe, Kambe, Chwaka, Rabai, Kauma
- [seg] – Segeju

Ethnologue's 'Duruma' may refer to the same thing as Maho's 'Degere', as the Degere are variously reported to speak Duruma, Digo, or a similar dialect of their own.

== Clicks ==
Clicks have been reported in ideophones from two dialects of Mijikenda: Digo and Duruma. (It is not known if they occur in the others.) These are tsya! /ʇ̃ǎ/ 'scram!' and /ʇ̃akule/ 'minute'. It is not known if these have any connection with the neighbouring Cushitic language Dahalo.
