= Kaloleni Constituency =

Kenyan electoral constituency

Kaloleni
- constituency for the Parliament of Kenya
- Kaloleni Constituency within Kilifi County

- Kilifi County within Kenya
- County: Kilifi
- Population: 193,682
- Area: 706 km^{2} (272.6 sq mi)

Current constituency
- Number of members: 1
- Party: ODM
- Member of Parliament: Katana Paul Kahindi
- Wards: 4

Kaloleni Constituency is an electoral constituency in Kenya. It is one of seven constituencies in Kilifi County and was established for the 1988 elections.

== Members of Parliament ==
Elections	MP	Party	Notes
1988	Matthias Benedict Keah	KANU	One-party system.
1992	Matthias Benedict Keah	KANU	
1997	Matthias Benedict Keah	KANU	
2002	Morris Mwachondo Dzoro	NARC	
2007	Samuel Kazungu Kambi	PNU	
2013	Gunga Mwinga	KADU-Asili	
2017	Paul Kahindi Katana	ODM	
2022	Paul Kahindi Katana	ODM	

== Locations and wards ==
Locations	Population
Jibana	17,025
Kaloleni	41,689
Kambe	13,324
Kayafungo	22,250
Mariakani	37,469
Mwanamwinga	21,634
Mwawesa	15,652
Rabai	37,670
Ribe	5,916
Ruruma	22,180
Tsangatsini	9,972
Total	244,781
1999 census.

Ward	Registered voters	Local authority
Jibana	6,257	Kilifi county
Kaliangombe	2,627	Mariakani town
Kaloleni	10,747	Kilifi county
Kambe	4,643	Kilifi county
Kawala	2,665	Mariakani town
Kayafungo	5,810	Kilifi county
Mariakani	6,979	Mariakani town
Mugumo-wa-patsa	5,447	Mariakani town
Mwanamwinga	5,662	Kilifi county
Rabai	4,233	Kilifi county
Ribe	1,739	Kilifi county
Ruruma / Mwaweza	10,612	Kilifi county
Tsangatsini	2,893	Mariakani town
Total	70,314	
*September 2005.
