= Mijikenda =

Mijikenda may refer to:

- Mijikenda peoples
- Mijikenda language
