= Fingo (talisman) =

Fingo is a protective talisman of the Mijikenda people in Coast Province, Kenya. Fingo are believed to attract guardian spirits (djinns). It is commonly buried in the kaya (sacred forest). Kaya elders take care of the fingo, which is said to have come from Shungwaya, the ancestral home of the Mijikenda. Considered to be interesting objet d'art, many fingo are stolen, while others are lost. The Giriama use large stones as fingo while other Mijikenda use a large pot of medicine. The pottery vessel contains not only medicine but also magic charms. It serves to protect the kaya and its inhabitants, one buried at the entrance and exit of each kaya.
