= Giryama dialect =

Variety of Mijikenda from southern Kenya

Giryama
- Native to: Kenya
- Region: Kilifi district
- Ethnicity: Mijikenda, Giryama
- Language family: Niger–Congo?: Atlantic–Congo; Volta-Congo; Benue–Congo; Bantoid; Southern Bantoid; Bantu; Northeast Bantu; Northeast Coast Bantu; Mijikenda; Giryama

Language codes
- ISO 639-3: nyf
- Glottolog: giry1241

Giryama is a dialect variety of the Mijikenda language spoken along the southern coast of Kenya, predominantly in the Kilifi district.

== Phonology ==
=== Consonants ===
		Bilabial		Labio- dental	Dental/Alveolar		Post-alv./ Palatal	Velar		Glottal
		plain	lab.	Labio- dental	plain	sibilant	Post-alv./ Palatal	plain	lab.	Glottal
Nasal		m	mʷ		n		ɲ	ŋ		
Plosive/ Affricate	voiceless	p			t	t͡s	t͡ʃ	k	kʷ	(ʔ)
Plosive/ Affricate	aspirated	pʰ			tʰ	t͡sʰ	tʃʰ	kʰ	kʷʰ	
Plosive/ Affricate	voiced	b			d	d͡z	d͡ʒ	ɡ	ɡʷ	
Plosive/ Affricate	prenasal	ᵐb			ⁿd	ⁿd͡z	ᶮd͡ʒ	ᵑɡ	ᵑɡʷ	
Fricative	voiceless			f		s	ʃ			h
Fricative	voiced	β		v	ð	z	ʒ			
Rhotic					ɾ ~ r					
Lateral					l					
Approximant							j		w	

- Labialized sounds /mʷ, kʷ, kʷʰ, ɡʷ, ᵑɡʷ/ can alternatively be pronounced as labio-velar stops [ŋ͡m, k͡p, k͡pʰ, ɡ͡b, ᵑɡ͡b] among speakers in free variation.
- /ɾ/ may have allophones as either [ɾ], [r], or [ɹ], all heard interchangeably.
- [ʔ] is only heard in between vowel sounds, to break up a sequence of two vowels.
- Taylor (1891), noted two dental stops [t̪, d̪], however they were not easy to identify and therefore are not considered as phonemes.

=== Vowels ===
	Front	Central	Back
Close	i		u
Mid	e		o
Open		a	

== Sources ==
- Taylor, William Ernest. 1891. Giryama vocabulary and collections. London: Society for Promoting Christian Knowledge (SPCK).
