= Matthias Benedict Keah =

Kenyan politician (1943–2005)

Mathias Benedict Keah (29 September 1943 – 25 July 2005) was a Kenyan politician and the Member of Parliament for Kaloleni Constituency in the Coast Province from 1988 to 2001. During this period, he also served as an Assistant Minister in the Ministries of Finance, Land & Settlement and Transport & Communications respectively.

== Early life ==
Keah was born on September 29, 1943, in Kizingo Village, Jibana Location in Kilifi District. He attended primary school in Kizingo after which joined St. Georges Secondary School for his Secondary Education. Thereafter, he joined Strathmore College.

== Professional life ==
He was an accountant by profession and was a member of the Institute of Certified Public Accountants of Kenya. During his professional career, he worked at Accountancy & Audit firms and at a Parastatal after which he established his own Accountancy and Consultancy practice. Over the years, he sat in the Boards of professional bodies and various international, regional and local financial and educational entities.

== Political life ==
In 1987, Keah vied won the Kaloleni Parliamentary seat on a KANU ticket. He successfully retained the seat in the 1992 and 1997 elections before losing it to Morris Dzoro during the 2002 elections. During his political life, Keah also served as an Assistant Minister in the Ministry of Finance, Ministry of Lands and Settlement and the Ministry of Transport and Communication.
