= Mariakani–Kaloleni–Mavueni Road =

Road in Kenya

Coordinates: 03°48′32″S 39°38′05″E

Route information
- Length: 37 mi (60 km)
- History: Designated in 2006; Completion in 2016 (Expected)

Major junctions
- South end: Mariakani
- Kaloleni
- North end: Mavueni

Location
- Country: Kenya

Highway system
- Transport in Kenya

Mariakani–Kaloleni–Mavueni Road is a road in Kenya, connecting the towns of Mariakani to Kaloleni and Mavueni, all in Kilifi County, Kenya.

== Location ==
The road starts at Mariakani, on the Nairobi–Mombasa Highway, approximately 34 kilometres (21 mi) northwest of Mombasa. From Mariakani, the road takes a northeasterly direction through Kaloleni to end at Mavueni, having a total distance of approximately 60 kilometres (37 mi).

== Overview ==
This road, is an important transport corridor for farmers, tourists and investors. It forms an alternative entry into Tsavo National Park for tourists from Kenya's north coast. It is classified as a Class C Road by the Kenya National Highway Authority. The road is prone to flooding during the rainy season.

== Upgrade and funding ==
Beginning circa 2006, the government of Kenya, through the Kenya National Highway Authority, began upgrading this road from bitumen surface to class II bitumen with shoulders, culverts and drainage channels. Sometime prior to February 2016, the Mariakani to Kaloleni section was upgraded to bitumen surface. The ongoing upgrade of the Kaloleni to Mavueni section, is expected to conclude later in 2016. Work is contracted to MuljiDevraj & Brothers Limited at a contract price of KSh 2.3 billion (approx. US$231 million), fully funded by the Kenyan government. *Note: US$1.00 = KSh99.58 on 7 April 2016

== See also ==
- List of roads in Kenya
