= Gunga Mwinga =

Kenyan politician (died 2020)

Member of the Kenyan Parliament
- In office 2013–2017
- Preceded by: Kazungu Kambi
- Succeeded by: Paul Katana
- Constituency: Kaloleni Constituency

Personal details
- Died: 27 December 2020 Mombasa, Kenya
- Party: Devolution Party of Kenya

Gunga Mwinga (died 27 December 2020) was a Kenyan politician who served as an MP for Kaloleni from 2013 to 2017.

He also formed and led the Devolution Party of Kenya.

Mwinga died from COVID-19, aged 45, in 2020.
