= Fundi Konde =

Kenyan musician

- Born: August 24, 1924; Mwabayanyundo village, Kilifi, Kenya
- Died: June 29, 2000 (aged 75) Kibera, Nairobi, Kenya
- Instrument: Electric guitar

Fundi Konde (August 24, 1924 – June 29, 2000) was a Kenyan musician. He was one of the first popular performers from that country, and was said to be the first electric guitarist from East Africa. His music utilized Swahili lyrics accompanied by a mixture of regional rhythms and imported rumba. His professional career began during World War II, when he performed for East African troops in South Asia. Returning home to Kenya, he made some of the earliest recordings from the region, including the hits "Mama Sowera", "Majengo Siendi Tena", "Kipenzi Waniua Ua" and "Jambo Sigara". He continued to perform and record until 1963, when he retired until the early 1980s, when he began singing, composing and producing again.

He was born in 1924 in Mwabayanyundo village, Kilifi District. He represented the Giriama tribe. He died in 2000 at his home in Kibera, Nairobi.He was buried Malindi, Kilifi county
