= Pokomo =

Pokomo may refer to:

- Pokomo people
- Pokomo language
