= Chonyi language =

Bantu language of Kenya

Chonyi
- "Chichonyi"
- Native to: Kenya
- Region: Kilifi County
- Ethnicity: Chonyi people
- Native speakers: 310,000 (2019)
- Language family: Niger–Congo: Atlantic–Congo; Benue–Congo; Bantoid; Bantu; Northeast Coast Bantu; Mijikenda; Chonyi

Language codes
- ISO 639-3: coh
- Glottolog: chon1287
- Guthrie code: E72c

Chonyi (Chonyi, Kichonyi, Chichonyi) is a Bantu language spoken along the eastern coast of Kenya in Kilifi County by the Chonyi people. It is part of the Mijikenda dialect cluster.

In 2019, there were an estimated 310,000 speakers. Of these, 39,000 spoke the Jibana dialect (Chidzihana) and 71,000 the Kauma dialect (Chikauma).

Chi- / ki-
| Chichonyi | Kigiryama | Kiswahili |
|---|---|---|
| Chihi | Kihi | Kiti |
| Chidogo | Kidogo | Kidogo |
| Chitu | Kitu | Kitu |

Greetings and etiquette
| Kiswahili | Chichonyi | |
|---|---|---|
| Umeamkaje? | Ulamkadze? | Amka- lamuka |
| Umeshindaje | Usindadze? | Shinda- sinda |
| Asante | Nasanta | Pole - Pore |

Counting from one to twenty
| | Kiswahili | Chichonyi |
|---|---|---|
| 1 | Mosi/ moja | Mosi/ mwenga |
| 2 | mbili | mbiri |
| 3 | tatu | tahu/hahu |
| 4 | nne | inne |
| 5 | tano | tsano |
| 6 | sita/tandatu | handahu |
| 7 | saba | fungahe |
| 8 | nane | nane |
| 9 | tisa/kenda | chenda |
| 10 | kumi | kumi |
| 11 | kumi na moja | kumi na mwenga |
| 12 | kumi na mbili | kumi na mbiri |
| 13 | kumi na tatu | kumi na tahu |
| 14 | kumi na nne | kumi na inne |
| 15 | kumi na tano | kumi na tsano |
| 16 | kumi na sita | |
| 17 | kumi na saba | kumi na fungahe |
| 18 | kumi na nane | kumi na nane |
| 19 | kumi na tisa | kumi na chenda |
| 20 | ishirini/miongo miwili | mirongo miiri |

Sehemu za mwili
| Kiswahili | Chichonyi |
|---|---|
| Kichwa | chitswa |
| Jicho (macho) | Dzitso(matso) |
| Pua | pula |
| Skio (maskio) | sikiro (masikiro) |
| Nywele | Nyere |
| Mkono | mkono |
| Kiganja | ganza |
| Kidole/ chanda | chala |
| Kifua | Chifua |
| Mguu | Mgulu |
| Shingo | Singo |
| Mdomo | Mlomo |
| Ulimi | Lulimi |
| Ngozi | Chingo |
| Mgongo | Mongo |
