= Segeju people =

Ethnic group from Tanga Region of Tanzania

Segeju
Asagidzu

Total population
- <25,000 (2012)

Regions with significant populations
- Tanzania: 18,688 (1969)
- Kenya: 8,000 (2012) (Note: In Kenya, the Segeju are considered a part of the Digo people on official censuses. As such, the true number of Kenyan Segeju is unknown.)

Languages
- Segeju, Digo, Swahili

Religion
- Predominantly Islam

Related ethnic groups
- Dhaiso, Kamba, Mijikenda, Shirazi, Swahili, other Bantu peoples

The Segeju (Swahili: Wasegeju; Mijikenda: Asagidzu) are a Bantu ethnolinguistic group mostly based in Tanzania's Tanga Region (particularly Mkinga District) and Kenya's Kwale County. Most Segeju reside in the small coastal strip between the Tanzanian city of Tanga and the Kenyan-Tanzanian border. However, some Segeju have migrated to urban areas in other parts of Tanzania or Kenya (e.g. Mombasa), in hopes of better employment opportunities and quality of life. Segeju migration to urban areas often results in severance of community ties, leading to a lack of transmission of important cultural traditions and language.

In 2012, the Segeju population was estimated to number fewer than 25,000, with fewer than 7,000 speaking the Segeju language. The Segeju have kinship relations with the Digo people, who are part of the nine tribes of the Mijikenda. Additionally, the Segeju have affines with the nearby Swahili and Shirazi. As a result, many Segeju have adopted the Swahili and Digo languages as mediums for wider communication.

== Ethnonym ==
- Person: Msegeju
- People: Wasegeju
- Language: Kisegeju

The ethnonym of Segeju is said to be derived from the Swahili words Kusega, meaning 'to draw' and juu, meaning 'up' or 'high'. The Segeju were said to have acquired the name following contact with the Shirazis in the 17th century, on account of the habit of their wearing of skin garments around their loins higher than was usual.

== History ==
=== Origins ===
Segeju oral traditions describe a close historical connection between them and the Dhaiso, an ethnic group primarily inhabiting the foot of the Usambara Mountains. The mother-tongue of the Dhaiso is a Thagicũ language, which is related to the Kamba language and other Bantu languages of Central Kenya. Some Segeju are aware that their ancestors spoke this Thagicũ language too and of their distant connection to the Kamba, Kikuyu, and other Thagicũ peoples. The linguistic connection between these peoples clearly indicates that the Segeju, Dhaiso, and Central Kenyan Bantu people share a common origin, presumably in the upper reaches of the Tana River.

However, according to Segeju traditions recorded by Mhando (2008), the Segeju state that they originated from Shungwaya. Shungwaya is a legendary place said to be roughly located north of Kenya's Paté Island in present-day Southern Somalia. Another version states that they came from Arabia, specifically Yemen.

=== c.1590 - 1630 ===
==== Zimba defeat, Segeju-Swahili coast rivalry ====
The Segeju also acted as a military for hire by Swahili city of Malindi. In the 16th century, The Zimba, a military arm of the Maravi Kingdom, goes on a rampage pillaging Swahili cities. After pillaging Mombasa, the Zimba head for Malindi but are annihilated by the Segeju when they were scaling the walls of Malindi. Segeju gain fame for this feat and later on, Malindi uses the Segeju as warriors for hire to siege the city of Mombasa on behalf of the Sheikh of Malindi. During the battle for Mombasa, Shehe bin Misham and his three adult sons are killed. Shortly afterward the Segeju occupied Mombasa, eventually surrendering it to the Sheikh of Malindi, who invites his ally, the Portuguese, to set up base.

=== c. 1650 - 1700 ===
==== Galla-Segeju conflict ====
Mhando records that the Segeju were attacked by the Galla in the second half of the 17th century. This caused their society to fragment into at least three sections. One of the groups fled to Lamu Island where they intermarried with the local people, giving rise to the Bajuni people. Another group fled to an area known as Mwangea while the third fled to the lower Tana region. The last group would later move to their current areas of occupancy due to long droughts in the Tana region.

== Culture ==
=== Religion ===
Virtually all Segeju are Sunni Muslims of the Shafi'ite school of thought due to a series of historical interactions and intermarriages with the neighboring Swahili in the 17th century. There is a small Christian minority among the Segeju of Kenya.
