= Fingo =

Fingo may refer to:

- Fingo (charm), a Norwegian folk charm supposed to deter burglary
- FinGO (company), a mobile communications company
- Fingo fever, a disease of Victorian Australia
- Fingo (Mfengu), a tribe of South Africa
- Fingo (talisman), a protective charm of the Mijikenda people
- 'Hypotheses non fingo', phrase coined by Isaac Newton
