= Kilifi District =

Former district of Kenya

Coordinates: 3.66667°S 39.75°E

Kilifi District was an administrative district in the Coast Province of Kenya. Its capital was coastal town Kilifi. The district had a population of 281,552.

Kilifi District was created by the colonial government in the 1920s. Its subdivision, Malindi, was carved out to form Malindi District. The district was located north and northeast of Mombasa.

Kilifi District was again merged with Malindi District to form Kilifi County in line with 2010 constitution of Kenya.

Local authorities (councils)
Authority	Type	Population*	Urban pop.*
Kilifi	Town	74,050	30,394
Mariakani	Town	57,984	10,987
Kilifi County	County	412,269	28,266
Total	-	544,303	69,647
* 1999 census. Source:

Administrative divisions
Division	Population*	Urban pop.*	Headquarters
Bahari	90,009	26,862	Kilifi
Bamba	35,852	1,307	Bamba
Chonyi	47,138	0	
Ganze	33,207	0	Ganze
Kaloleni	197,033	13,964	Kaloleni
Kikambala	97,898	23,997	Mtwapa
Vitengeni	43,159	0	Vitengeni
Total	544,303	66,130	
* 1999 census. Sources: , ,

The district had three constituencies:

- Bahari Constituency
- Ganze Constituency
- Kaloleni Constituency

== See also ==
- Takaungu, a village in Kikambala division, 10 km south of Kilifi town
