= Kigango =

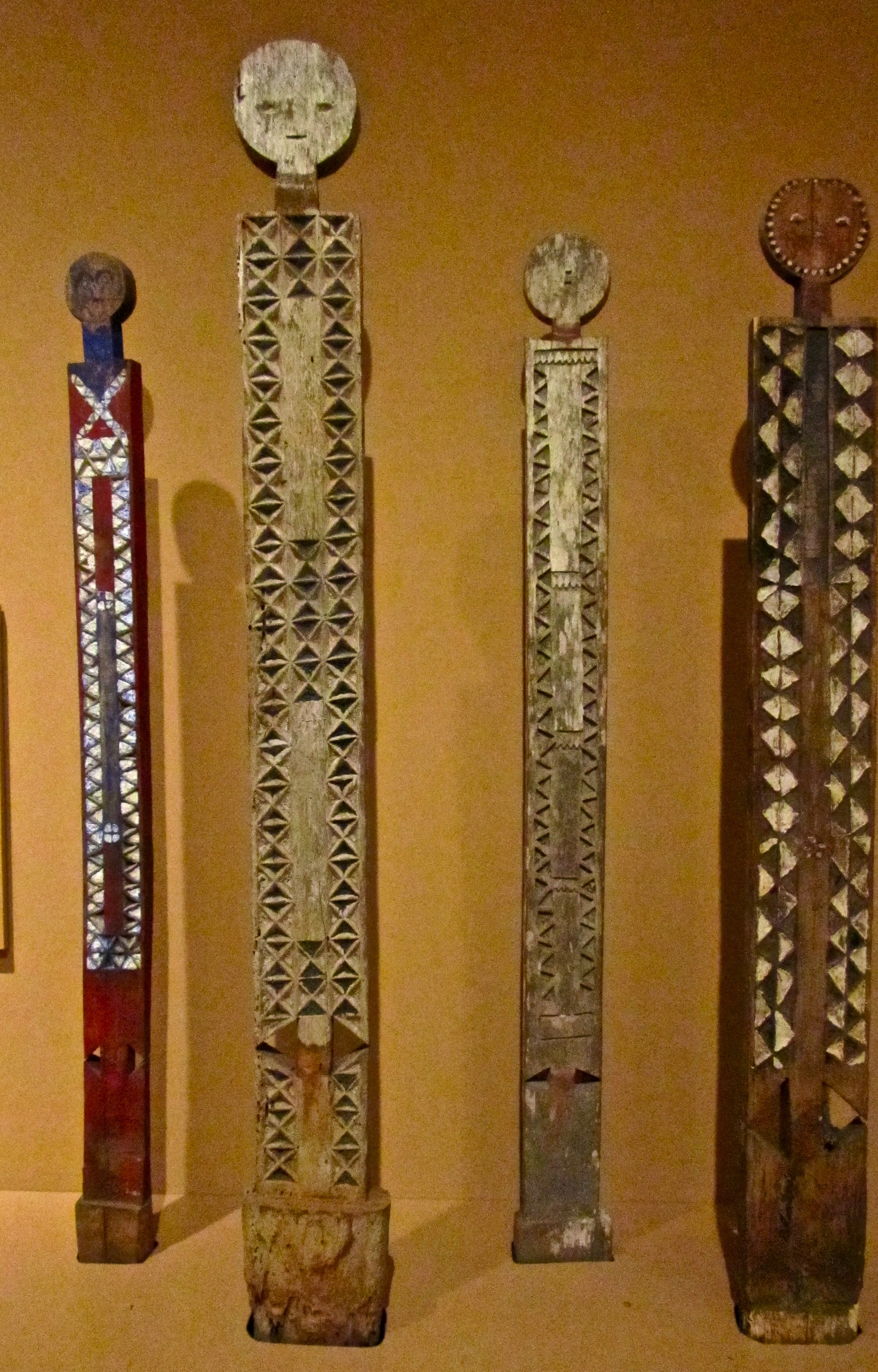
Vigango

Kigango (plural: vigango) is a carved wooden memorial statue erected by the Mijikenda peoples of the southeastern Kenya coast. The vigango, which can be stylized, abstracted human-form effigies and are placed vertically rising out of the earth, honor a dead member of the secret Gohu society, or the "Society of the Blessed".

They were traditionally allowed to stand until they naturally decomposed, or they were abandoned and replaced at subsequent village locations by a second generation figure known as a kibao (plural: vibao), thereby transferring away whatever spiritual power was thought to remain from the original kigango. This was a natural result of the Mijikenda's centuries old practice of slash and burn agriculture and, subsequently, the periodic changing of village locations.

The hard-wood kigango is approximately life-size and may have been painted. Vigango have been celebrated and collected by artists and collectors around the world, including Andy Warhol. Numerous vigango are now in U.S. museums, although some were discovered to have been stolen and were returned to Kenya. However, vigango were openly and legally for sale from reputable art galleries and curio shops in Kenya from the early 1970s until at least the mid-1990s. Anthropologist Monica Udvardy of the University of Kentucky has been particularly active in writing about theft of vigango and their repatriation from US and European museums.

In July 2023, the Illinois State Museum returned 37 wooden memorial statues, known as vigango, to the National Museums of Kenya for repatriation to Mijikenda communities. These statues are considered sacred cultural objects and are believed to carry the spirits of male elders who have passed away.

== Restitution ==
There have been processes put in place for the restitution of the various kigangos back to their original place to be able to connect the people of Kenya with their ancestors as these kigango served as a spiritual tool rather than just artifacts. Many people have been involved making sure this is achieved. The earliest process began when the memorial artifact were taken out of Kenya and eventually found their way to the California State University, Fullerton (CSUF) Museum in the United States. Ernie Wolfe III, an African art trader and collector, arranged for the museum to obtain 27 vigango in December 1991 on behalf of Joseph and Laura Ciaramella. Subsequent investigations by academics and staff at the National Museums of Kenya proved that the vigango connected to Wolfe had been acquired by some illegal trafficking of cultural artifacts.

The process of returning the 27 vigango to Kenya by CSUF started November, 2011, where a documentation ceremony was done for transferring ownership of the items to the National Museums of Kenya which was signed by museum officials and Kenyan representatives at a transfer ceremony. After being taken out of storage, the vigango were packaged for transportation. When the vigango arrived at Nairobi's Jomo Kenyatta International Airport in January 2014, a contradictory issue arose. Kenyan officials were notified that an import duty of around US$47,000 was necessary before the artifacts could be released to the Mijikenda. Although their significance to the Mijikenda was largely spiritual and cultural, the tax was determined based on their monetary value as African art.

The situation was still being addressed. Since the items were supposed to be returned to their community due to their spiritual and cultural importance. Dr. Purity Kiura of the National Museums of Kenya contended that they should not be regarded as any regular commercial artworks. Advocates and people of the community also urged their release. Authorities found out in 2017 that the 27 vigango had left the airport storage facility. They had reportedly been reabsorbed into the illegal trading network, according to additional inquiry. It's still unclear where they are right now.

Another attempt to restitute a different set of vigango the 30 Vigango was in 1990, actor Gene Hackman and film producer Art Linson donated the 30 vigango to the Denver Museum of Nature and Science in the United States. Later it was established that the vigango weren’t given but had been removed from Kenya through the illicit art trade. The Denver Museum subsequently decided to return the objects to Kenya, even though they were not willing to return them.

The 30 vigango were later agreed to be returned to Kenya and it was kept at the Fort Jesus Museum in Mombasa after the repatriation was formally decided upon in February 2014. In 2019, a formal transfer to Mijikenda elders signified the restoration of a significant aspect of their spiritual and cultural legacy. After that, the items were retained for additional internal studies to identify their original communities or families.

Around 1999 some vigango that were made in 1985 by Kalume Mwakiru Katana in remembrance of his brothers who had passed away. vigango were taken shortly after the researcher Monica Udvardy took pictures of them. Katana then attempted the restitution of the vigango by asking Udvardy to locate them. She first found one at the Illinois State University Museum in 1999, and then she found the second at the Hampton University Museum. The vigango had been stolen from Kenya and sold to American museums and collectors, according to additional findings. Twenty-two years after they were taken, on June 20, 2007, Katana's two vigango were returned to his house outside Kaloleni, Kenya, following years of investigation. Officials from the government and museum attended the community celebration to commemorate the return.
