= Kandie =

Kandie is a surname of Kenyan origin. Notable people with the surname include:

- Joshua Chepyegon Kandie, Kenyan politician
- Kibiwott Kandie (born 1996), Kenyan long-distance runner, holder of half marathon world record
- Phyllis Kandie (born c.1965), Kenyan politician
- Samson Kandie (born 1971), Kenyan long-distance runner
