= Mavueni =

- Location within Kenya
- Coordinates: 03°40′54.36″S 39°48′59.36″E
- Country: Kenya
- County: Kilifi County
- Time zone: UTC+3 (EAT)

Mavueni is a neighborhood in the city of Kilifi, in Kenya's Kilifi County.

== Location ==
Mavueni is located at the southern tip of the city of Kilifi, approximately 58 kilometres (36 mi), by road, north of the port city of Mombasa. The coordinates of Mavueni are: 3°40'54.36"S, 39°48'59.36"E (Latitude:-3.681767; Longitude:39.816489).

== Overview ==
Mavueni is a mixed residential-commercial neighborhood, hosting the main campus of Pwani University, warehouses of Mavueni Enterprises Limited, a branch of Tuskys Supermarkets, Kilifi County Hospital and Mavueni Primary School. As the city of Kilifi expands and as the population increases, the area has seen increasing land disputes.

The Mariakani–Kaloleni–Mavueni Road ends here, approximately 60 kilometres (37 mi), northeast of Mariakani.

== See also ==
- List of roads in Kenya
- Pwani University
