= Dhaiso people =

Ethnic group from Tanga Region of Tanzania

Dhaiso
Wadaiso

Total population
- 5,000

Regions with significant populations
- Tanzania Tanga Region (Muheza District)

Languages
- Dhaiso language & Swahili

Religion
- Islam; African Traditional Religion

Related ethnic groups
- Segeju & other Bantu peoples

- Person: Mdaiso
- People: Wadaiso
- Language: Kidaiso

The Dhaiso, or Daiso (Wadaiso, in Swahili) are a Bantu ethnolinguistic group based at the foot of the Usambara Mountains in the Muheza District of Tanga Region in northeastern Tanzania. In 1999, the Dhaiso population was estimated to number 5,000, and the Dhaiso language is not being transmitted by adults to children. The Dhaiso are historically related to the Segeju, and are sometimes referred to as "Islamized Segeju". The Segeju are also found in the Kwale county of Kenya. Most of their tradition has been heavily influenced by their populous Digo neighbors. The Dhaiso and the Segeju are also historically linked to the Kamba people of kenya.

== Society ==
Dhaiso people are mostly farmers or, if on the coast, fishermen. Farmers commonly grow cocoa beans, coconut cassava, black pepper and cinnamon. Many of the larger farms have running water which are gravity fed from springs in the mountains. Houses are similar to others in the region which are commonly made with stick frames filled with small rocks and covered over with mud. Many homes have fenced courtyards or verandas for shade and protection from the rain. The Dhaiso have a Muslim society and men often trousers and shirts are common paired with Muslim hats. Some men may wear the long Kanzu. Women wear the African Kanga. Many also wear western style dresses, skirts, and blouses. Polygamy is part of the Dhaiso culture. A wife's funeral expenses are divided among the husband and his brothers and the brothers and sisters of the dead woman. ExpensesThe husband's additional wives also contribute to expensesddings and funerals are marked by the beating of the war drums. Inheritance laws apply to coconut palms, but not to land, huts, and livestock.

== Language ==
Daiso (language) is also called Kidhaiso. Speakers are found in the Tanzanian villages of Bwiti and Magati at the base of the eastern Usambara mountains on the northern side, and in the Muheza district in the Tanga region. The language is related to Kamba of Kenya.

Because many Dhaiso people have intermarried with people of different languages, the language is not being passed on to newer generations (most primary-school age children do not speak Dhaiso) as there is a need for wider communication. Because of this need, most Dhaiso are fluent in Swahili. Swahili is the national language and the language of trade along the coast. For a majority of Dhaiso, Swahili is their mother tongue. and many also say they can speak other neighboring languages like Digo or Sambaa. In 1999, with 5,000 speakers, Dhaiso was considered by UNESCO to be a "definitely endangered" language.
