= Kaya Mudzi Muvya =

Coordinates: 3°44′37″S 39°34′18″E

Kaya Mudzi Muvya is a coastal lowland dry deciduous forest in Kilifi County of southern Kenya. It became a World Heritage Site in 2008. A large portion of the forest is an area protected by the Kenya Forest Service under The Forests Act of 2005, and as a national monument under the Antiquities and Monuments Act Cap 215. The forest is sacred to the local Mijikenda people, known as the Rabai (Warabai in Swahili). The forest has suffered deprevation over the past hundred years.

== Sacred forest ==
Among the Mijikenda the forest is their home. Each group has a kaya, or sacred forest. Kaya means both home and sacred forest. The Kaya Mudzi Muvya was one of the three kaya of the Rabai people. Traditionally they lived in the forest, although now they live in communities outside the forest. Nonetheless, the kaya plays an important role in the lives of the Rabai, as the home of their ancestral spirits and the locus for various ceremonies. The forest also provides the source for various traditional herbs.

Actual ritual places are considered private and are closed to the public, but a replica has been constructed in Rabai as part of an ecotourism project.
