= Pokomo language =

Bantu language spoken in Kenya

Pokomo
- Kipfokomo
- Native to: Kenya
- Region: Tana River District
- Ethnicity: Pokomo
- Native speakers: 95,000 (2009 census)
- Language family: Niger–Congo?: Atlantic–Congo; Volta-Congo; Benue–Congo; Bantoid; Southern Bantoid; Bantu; Northeast Bantu; Northeast Coast Bantu; Sabaki; Pokomo
- Dialects: Gwano; Kinakomba; Malalulu; Ndera; Ndura; Zubaki

Language codes
- ISO 639-3: pkb
- Glottolog: poko1261
- Guthrie code: E.71

Pokomo (Kipfokomo) is a Bantu language spoken primarily along the East African coast near the Tana River in the Tana River District by the Pokomo people of Kenya. The Kipfokomo language originated from the Kingozi language, which is also the ancestor of Swahili. Pokomos are the only tribe in the world that speak "Kingozi" and sometimes are referred to as wangozi because they used to wear skins (Ngozi). All adult speakers of Pokomo are bilingual in Swahili, the lingua franca of much of East Africa.

There is high of lexical similarity between other languages like Mvita (63%), Amu (61%), Mrima (60%), Kigiryama (59%), Chidigo (58%) or Bajun (57%).

== Phonology ==
Consonants
	Bilabial	Labiodental	Dental	Alveolar	Palatal	Velar	Glottal
Plosive	p b		t̪ d̪	t d		k g	
Affricate				ts dz	tʃ dʒ		
Implosive	ɓ			ɗ	ʄ		
Fricative	ɸ β	f v	ð	s z	ʃ	ɣ	h
Nasal	m			n	ɲ		
Trill				r̥ r			
Approximant	w			l	j		

Vowels
	Front	Central	Back
High	i iː		u uː
Mid	e eː		o oː
Low		a aː	

Pokomo does not have phonemic tone.
