= Ngadji =

Ngadji is a wooden drum with dimensions of 276.50 cm in height, 60 cm in width, and 70 cm in depth. To the Pokomo people in Kenya, the instrument is a symbol of authority, spirituality, governance and social order. The drum is a museum artifact currently in the possession of the British Museum. It was carved by a talented wood carver from a sacred tree made from a hollow tree trunk in which the dried skin is stretched in other to produce strong and powerful echoes. The size of the drum is more than five feet tall.

== History ==
In 1902, British colonial officials in Kenya seized the Ngadji during resistance to British land and tax policies. Colonial administrator Claud Hollis gifted it to the British Museum in 1908. The British Museum has acknowledged that the Mgadji was confisticated before it received it as a donation in 1908.

== Cultural significance ==
Ngadji is a symbol of authority, governance and social order for the Pokomo people. It was designed to make loud and powerful reverberations in order to be heard along the Tana River. It has the ability to get the attention of Pokomo people and bring them together for spiritual, traditional ceremonies, and unification in worship. Unique reverberations of Ngadji are used in signaling the enthronement of the king.

It goes beyond its physical form to connect to its importance and role in the community. It United the Pokomo people together for their activities. Council of elders named the Kidjo are connected to the drum because of the traditional authority they held and some of the spiritual practices they perform connected to the Ngadji drum.

== Repatriation efforts ==
Mkidjo Baiba works and resides in Liverpool, United Kingdom where he came in contact with the Ngadji drum at the British Museum in 2013 which led to the efforts in recovering the drum. He was an indigene of Pokomo and brother of the King of Pokomo who knew about the history of the drum and was quick to identify the sacred drum at the British Museum after 100 years since its diappearance. When he returned to Kenya, he called for the first meeting with the Chairman of the Gasa Council of Leaders, Mzee(Haye) Mohamed Akare Berhe. In this meeting, he shared the news of seeing the Ngadji drum with them. This was an exciting news to the community and Mkidjo Baiba Dhidha Mjidho was permitted to carry on with the plans to return the drum.

A cultural festival was held in the year 2014 in Hola which was actively supported by The Tana River Department of Tourism, Culture and Wildlife conservation in order to bring up the Pokomo traditional practices which included their dance, rituals and craft. A picture of the Ngadji drum was also displayed while the Gasa elders delivered speeches on the cultural significance of the drum while pushing the effort and importance of recovering it.

In 2016, Haye (Dr) Makorani-a-Mungase VII King of Pokomo and Mkidjo Baiba visited the British Museum to see the Ngadji and subsequently requested its return. The museum declined restitution and offered a temporary loan, which was rejected. In 2019 Haye (Dr) Makorani-a-Mungase VII and Mkidjo Baiba established the Recovery of the Ngadji Initiative in the UK to strengthen the campaign for the drum's restitution. In August 2019, Brad Torum launched an online petition as part of restitution efforts asking that the British Museum return the Ngadji drum. The Pokomo community also sent a letter signed by the council of elders to the British Museum requesting the return of the Ngadji. The Pokomo people want a total return of the drum rather than a loan.

In 2020, the Recovery of the Ngadji Initiative joined forces with the diaspora group, Black Initiative Alliance to strengthen its campaign for the return of the sacred Ngadji drum to the Pokomo people. The Pokomo community, together with the county government and the State of the African Diaspora, signs an agreement to pursue the restoration and return of the Ngadji drum from the British Museum. The State of African Diaspora, with support from the Pokomo community and local government, contacted the British Museum seeking the Ngadji's return. The museum noted that it was already engaging with the Black Initiative Alliance and Recovery of the Ngadji Initiative. Dispute over representation in restitution negotiations. The State of African Diaspora has asked the British Museum to clarify who was authorised to represent the Pokomo community and requested that negotiations with the Recovery of the Ngadji Initiative be paused pending clarification.
