= Mekatilili Wa Menza =

Kenyan rebel

Mnyazi wa Menza, also known as Mekatilili Wa Menza or Mekatilili (1860s-1924), was a Kenyan independence activist who led the Giriama people against the colonial administration of Kenya between 1912 and 1915.

== Early life ==
Mekatilili was born in the 1860s at Mutsara wa Tsatsu in Bamba, in present-day Kilifi County. She was an only daughter in a family of five children. One of her brothers, Mwarandu, was kidnapped by Arab slave traders and was never seen again. At some point in her life, Mekatilili became married to Dyeka at Lango Baya.

== Anti-colonial rebellion ==
Mekatilili's resistance was driven by economic and social-cultural concerns. She sought to prevent any Giriama laborers from being employed by the colonial authorities, ensuring that they would remain in Giriama territory and contribute to the well-being of Giriama people. She also was concerned about the increasing Western influence in Kenya, which she saw as eroding Giriaman culture.

On 13 August 1913, the colonial administrator for the region, Arthur Champion, held a public meeting where he gave his demands to the community. Mekatilili played a major role in the meeting as she expressed her opposition to Champion's demands and gave a verbal oath that she would not cooperate with the colonial administrators.

Mekatilili was agitated by what she saw as the erosion of traditional Giriama culture. The Giriama are a patrilineal community and women rarely hold leadership positions. However, Mekatilili was a widow. In Giriama society, women enjoy certain privileges, including that of speaking before the elders. She rounded up support for her cause against the colonial authorities due to the position she had attained as a strong believer of the traditional religion. In this, she was aided by the traditional medicineman Wanje wa Mwadori Kola. She gained a large audience through her performance of the Kifudu dance. The dance was reserved for funeral ceremonies but Mekatilili performed it constantly from town to town, attracting a large following that followed her wherever she went.

Mekatilili and Mwadori organized a large meeting at Kaya Fungo where they administered the mukushekushe oath among the women and Fisi among the men who vowed never to cooperate with the colonial authorities in any way or form. The colonial authorities responded by seizing large tracts of Giriama land, burning their homes and razing Kaya Fungo. This led to the unsuccessful Giriama Uprising, known locally as kondo ya chembe.

Mekatilili was arrested by the colonial authorities on 17 October 1913, and exiled to Kisii in Nyanza Province. According to colonial records, five years later, she returned to her native area where she continued to oppose the imposition of colonial policies and ordinances. Mekatilili stated that Arthur Champion was solely responsible for forcing colonial policies on Giriama, which she claimed was eroding the traditional culture of Kenya. However, some narratives say that Mekatilili escaped from the prison in Kisii and walked over 1,000 kilometers back home to Giriama. She was later arrested and sent to a prison in Kismayu, Somalia where she also mysteriously escaped and returned to her home. She then died in 1920

== Death, Legacy and tribute ==
She died in 1924, and was buried in Bungale, in Malindi District, in the Coast Province of the Colony and Protectorate of Kenya. During Kenya's 1980 feminist movement, activists considered Mekatilili a symbol for the movement, as she was the first recorded Kenyan woman to participate in a fight for social change. On August 9, 2020, Google celebrated her with a Google Doodle.

== Known photographs ==
For much of history, there were believed to be no images or photos of Mekatilili. Her depiction in modern Kenya relied on re-imagined models and attire. Most recreations are historically inaccurate for instance; the use of the Maasai shuka. That changed in April 2026 when an authentic photo was discovered in the University of Cambridge Digital Library within colonial-era anthropological and administrative archives. The photograph likely taken in 1913 is a mug shot of Mekatilili during her captivity by British Colonial forces.
