= Takaungu =

Historic Swahili town in Kilifi County, Kenya

Coordinates: 3°41′S 39°51′E

Takaungu is a historic Swahili town located on the Kenyan Coast between Mombasa and Malindi, in Kilifi County.

It is 10 kilometres south of the town of Kilifi, in the Kikambala division. Takaungu is located at the Creek in Kilifi North Constituency of Kilifi County in Coast Province. It is 37 km from Mombasa and it is 3 km from the Mombasa - Malindi Road just after the Vipingo Sisal estate.There are eight villages found in the outskirts of Takaungu, namely: Maweni, Vuma, Kayanda, Viungani, Mashehe, Kanyumbuni, Boyani and Kibaoni. Just behind Takaungu, there are two neighboring Mijikenda communities. The Chonyi's in the south and the Kauma's in the north. These two tribes did not settle in Takaungu as they were cultivators and were not fishermen nor sailors.

The town has a population of 10,800. Fishing, local coral quarry are currently the main industries. The population consists of Swahili Muslims, mostly living in or near the town center and a sizable Christian community in the shambas or countryside that surrounds it.

Takaungu was settled in the early 19th century by members and clients of the Mazrui family. Migrating fishers from the Bajun Islands to the north probably founded a temporary fishing village there before the Mazrui arrived (as they are known to have done so at many places along the coast). Certainly, other Bajun migrated in numbers to the growing settlement (Koffsky 1977) and later Mijikenda also moved to the town. Takaungu has grown considerably in size, and where once there were shambas (farming plots), today there are houses, and the shambas have moved to the outskirts of the present town.

The primary languages are Kigiriama, used predominantly by the local Giriama tribe (part of the broader group of Coastal tribes called Mijikenda, meaning "nine villages") and Kiswahili.

The regional headquarters of a non-governmental development organization, the East African Center, are located in Takaungu.

== History ==
The village of Takaungu was established by a section of the Mazrui Families who had rebelled against the leadership of the new Sultan of Oman from the El Busaidy Dynasty. Earlier the Mazrui Dynasty were appointed to govern Mombasa by the Sultan of Oman after he defeated the Portuguese and took over Fort Jesus in 1698.

The Mazrui Dynasty were appointed to govern Mombasa in 1741 and their closest trading partners were the largest Mijikenda tribe - The Giriama's. The Giriamas were living in the hinterland of Coast and unlike the Chonyis and Kaumas did not border the Coast Shoreline. However, after murder of Sultan Seif in Oman and the emergence of the El Busaidy leadership, The Mazrui Governor of Mombasa Mohammed Ibn Othman El Mazrui refused to recognise the new El Busaidy Authority.

This led to the siege of Mombasa and the eventual killing of the Mazrui Governor. The rebellion of the Mazrui took a long time until the son of the Sultan of Oman finally ended the rebellion by leading an onslaught of the bombardment of Mombasa in 1837. Most of the Mazrui leader's were either killed or deported.

The Mazrui families fled Mombasa and some settled in Gasi (Kwale County) and others moved north of Mombasa and established themselves in Takaungu (Kilifi County). Takaungu was established by the fleeing Mazrui Dynasty who refused to recognise the authority of the new Sultan of Oman who was from the El Busaidy Dynasty.

== See also ==
- Historic Swahili Settlements
- Swahili architecture
