= Phyllis Kandie =

Kenyan ambassador to Belgium (born 1965)

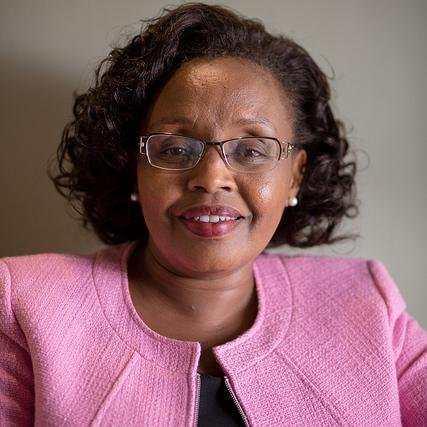

Ambassador of Kenya to Belgium, Luxembourg and the European Union

Amb.
- In office 27 January 2018 – April 2022
- President: Uhuru Kenyatta
- Preceded by: Johnson Mwangi Weru
- Succeeded by: Bitange Ndemo

Cabinet Secretary - East African Affairs and Labour

CS.
- In office 25 April 2012 – December 2016
- President: Uhuru Kenyatta

Cabinet Secretary - Labour and Social Protection

CS.
- In office December 2016 – 27 January 2018
- President: Uhuru Kenyatta
- Preceded by: Kazungu Kambi
- Succeeded by: Peter Munya

Personal details
- Born: Phyllis Jepkosgei Kipkingor Kandie c. 1965 (age 60–61) Eldama Ravine, Kenya
- Citizenship: Kenya
- Spouse: Julius Kandie
- Children: 2
- Education: Bachelor of Commerce; Master of Arts; Master of Business Administration
- Alma mater: Saint Mary's University; Middlesex University; Durham University
- Occupation: Presidential advisor

Phyllis Jepkosgei Kipkingor Kandie, also Phyllis Jepkosgei Kandie, but commonly known as Phyllis Kandie (born c. 1965) is the advisor to president William Ruto on Commodities Market Development in 2023. She previously served the former Ambassador to Belgium, Luxembourg and the European Union, appointed by the former president Uhuru Kenyatta on January 27, 2018. She was as the Cabinet Secretary for East African Affairs and Labor, immediately prior to her present assignment.

== Background and education ==
Phyllis Kandie was born in Eldama Ravine, Baringo County, in 1965. She has a Bachelor of Commerce degree, majoring in Economics as a major, obtained from Saint Mary's University, in Halifax, Nova Scotia in Canada. She then undertook postgraduate studies at Middlesex University and Durham University, in the United Kingdom, graduating with a Master of Business Administration (MBA) degree.

== Career before politics ==
Phyllis Kandie served as the Director of investment advisory services at Standard Investment Bank, prior to her appointment to cabinet. She also served as a regulator within the Capital Markets, energy and agricultural sectors. She also served as a consultant for the World Bank and the European Union, regarding the SME sector.

== Career as cabinet secretary ==
Kandie was appointed by president Uhuru Kenyatta to serve as the Cabinet Secretary for East African Affairs and Labour from 25 April 2013 until December 2015. She was moved from the Ministry of East African Affairs and Labour to serve as the Labour and Social Protection cabinet secretary, replacing Kazungu Kambi after he was suspended from office over corruption allegations.

== Diplomatic career ==
Kandie was dropped from the cabinet on January 27, 2018 and appointed as Kenya's ambassador to Belgium, Luxembourg and the European Union by President Uhuru Kenyatta.

== Family ==
Phyllis Kandie is married to Ambassador Julius Kandie, a Kenyan diplomat and former Solicitor General. She is the mother of two sons, Lawrence and Simon.

== Other considerations ==
She served on several boards of directors, including on the board of Kenya Revenue Authority from 2010 to 2013. She is a member of the Institute of Directors of Kenya and of Kenya Private Sector Alliance (KEPSA), and the Association of Stockbrokers and Investment Banks. She was engaged as the Director of Investment Advisory Services at Standard Investment Bank. She has also served as a regulator within capital markets, energy and the agricultural sector. She has been a business advisory consultant for the SME sector, having consulted for the World Bank.

== See also ==
- Cabinet of Kenya
- Ministry of Foreign Affairs (Kenya)
- List of Durham University people
