= Pokomo people =

Bantu ethnic group of southeastern Kenya

Pokomo
Total population
- 112,075 (Kenya) (2019)

Regions with significant populations
- Kenya

Languages
- Pokomo • Swahili • English

Religion
- Predominantly: Islam Minority: Christianity

Related ethnic groups
- Mijikenda, Swahili, other Bantu peoples

Location of the tana river county in Kenya.

The Pokomo people are a Bantu ethnic group of southeastern Kenya. Their population in Kenya was 112,075 in 2019. They are a distinct ethnic group with their own sub-clans and tribes. Despite their proximity, they are distinct from the nearby Mijikenda people. They are predominantly agriculturalists and both freshwater and ocean fishermen living along the Tana River in Tana River County. They speak the Pokomo language, which is similar to the Swahili language.

The Pokomo population is split into two groups: the Upper Pokomo, who make up 75% of the population, and the Lower Pokomo. The Upper Pokomo are mainly Muslim, and have been so since the end of the 19th century. The Lower Pokomos, who live along the lower part of the Tana up to the delta, are mainly Christians, converting to the religion by the early 20th century. Ethnologue indicates that the group overall is mainly Muslim.

== Subgroups ==
In "History of Linguistics: Case Study of Tana River", Derek Nurse wrote that the Pokomo regard themselves and their language as divisible into Lower (LP) and Upper Pokomo (UP). The people and the language of roughly the northern one-third of the River Tana towards Garisa are known as Malakote (also known as Ilwana or El-Wana). Malakote differ considerably from UP and LP. Even the two-way split UP: LP is partly artificial linguistically. The major break occurs around Mwina, but there are also internal isoglosses dividing UP and LP. Some of these link adjoining parts of UP and LP.

Within Pokomo, considerable linguistic variation occurs at all levels: lexical, phonological and morphological. Despite the small size of the Pokomo community, at least as much internal difference separates UP and LP as do the two poles of the 150-mile-long (240 km) Malakote community. Van Otterloo assessed the level of lexical similarity between UP and LP as much the same as that between Giriama and Digo. UP and LP refer to each other jocularly as "two-week" languages; that is, they take two weeks to learn, but Malakote, within UP, is regarded as a "two-months language". According to Nurse, this indicates that the Pokomo are not part of the Mijikenda community, which is composed of nine sub-tribes: the Kauma, Chonyi, Jibana, Giriama, Kambe, Ribe, Rabai, Duruma and Digo.

The Pokomo are subdivided into eleven sub-tribes: six in the UP (Mila Julu) and five in the LP (Mila Nchini). The word Mila connotes "culture"; julu, nchini and kote mean "up", "lower" and "both" respectively; therefore the word milajulu refers to the culture of the Upper Pokomo and milanchini to the culture of the Lower Pokomo. Thus, Milakote (evolving into Malakote) connotes culture from both sides (here referring to the blended culture of the Pokomo and Orma/Somalis/Borana).

=== Upper Pokomo (Wantu wa Julu: "Milajulu") ===
All UP clans live along the river and in the hinterland from the river on both sides in villages located on small hills, likely to avoid river flooding. The farmlands are within the riverine on both sides of the river, stretching an average of 3 miles (4.8 km) or until the farms touch the sandy soils.

- Milalulu (located along the riverine from Rhoka village in the north to Bohoni village)
- Zubaki (mostly found from Chewani village to Lenda village)
- Ndura (within Kelokelo village to Maweni and Mazuni village)
- Kinankomba (from Boji and Bububu to Kilindini)
- Gwano (from Wenje village to Baomo and Hara village)
- Ndera (from Mnazini village to Sera village)

=== Lower Pokomo (Milanchini) ===
The LP occupy the entire Tana Delta (which starts at Baomo) to the mouth of the river before it empties into the Indian Ocean; however, some UP have settled together with the LP in the villages of Kipini, Ozi, Kilelengwani, Chara, Chamwanamuma, and Kau, among other villages up to the Lamu Archipelago and its surrounding islands.

- Mwina (live in the villages of Mnguvweni, Gamba, Sera, Mikameni and Mitapani)
- Ngatana (live in the villages of Wema, Hewani, Maziwa, Kulesa, Vumbwe, Sera, Gamba and Garsen)
- Buu (live in Ngao, Tarasaa, Odha, Sailoni, Sera, Golbanti and Idsowe villages)
- Dzunza (mostly found in Kibusu and Shirikisho villages)
- Kalindi (border the Giriamas in Malindi)

In these sub-tribes, clans range from three to nine in either sub-tribe, and they are mostly found cutting across the eleven sub-tribes. The same clan may have different reference names across sub-tribes. The Zubaki sub-tribe is the largest amongst the Pokomo sub-tribes. It has nine clans: Karhayu, Meta, Jabha, Kinaghasere, Garjedha, Utah, Ilani and Kinakala.

=== Tana River and name origins ===
The name "Tana" originated from early European Christian missionaries. The UP may have known of other rivers, including Chana Maro or River Maro, while the LP referred to the river as "Tsana" ("river"). To them, this was the primary river, and others were referred to as Muho or Mukondo ("streams"). "Chana" also means "river".

When the first European missionaries arrived at the Tana River, they reportedly found it difficult to pronounce the word "Tsana" and adapted it to "Tana".

== Culture ==
Pokomo culture incorporates specific rules and rituals. Pokomo culture was exported to the Lamu Archipelago and its surrounding islands, Nkasija and to the Comoro Islands.

According to folk tradition, the name Lamu came from the word Muyamu, which means "in-laws", indicating that the Pokomo intermarried with Arabs during the 12th to 13th centuries. Pokomo artifacts are displayed in the Lamu Museum. During this time, the Swahili culture was developing. Intermarriage between Pokomos and Arabs in Lamu is one possible origin of the Swahili people, Swahili culture and the Swahili language (which evolved from the Kingozi language) in East Africa, as indicated in Nurse and Spears' book The Swahili, Reconstructing the History and Language of an African Society 800–1500. In Bishop Steers' biography (1869), he wrote about Liongo Fumo, whose grave, water well and settlement can all be found in Ozi village.

Evidence of Pokomo cultural influence has been found on Pate Island, where many of the Islamic teachers (Sheikhs) are Pokomos. The name "Comoro" may have been derived from the Pokomo name "Komora". The Comoroans and the Pokomo can communicate and understand one another, as noted by Nurse.

The Pokomo are the only ethnic group that continues to use the Kingozi language. The Kingozi language is the precursor of Swahili, as quoted on page 98 in The Periplus of the Erythraean Sea: Travel and Trade in the Indian Ocean. Pokomo culture includes folk tales, songs, dances, weddings and traditional arts.

=== Folklore ===
Stories were traditionally used to influence behaviour. For example, a story warned that whistling during the night would cause an encounter with a spirit being (seha). This was meant to teach children not to whistle at night to avoid disclosing their location to enemies.

=== Age groups ===
Age groups are formed by adolescent men who are circumcised together. Some of these age groups are:

- Uhuru or Wembe – circumcised during the time of Kenya gaining independence
- Mau Mau
- Shiti
- Pali
- Kingishore

=== Initiation to adulthood ===
The passage to adulthood for men is marked by an initiation which involves circumcision (kuhinywa).

=== Marriage and wedding ===
The marriage process within the Pokomo community includes specific conditions (Maadha). The man informs his parents, who examine the background of the woman's family. Upon their approval, they visit the bride's family with a perenkera, a small vessel for holding tobacco. At the bride's parents' house, they give her parents the perenkera as a sign to indicate their son's desire. They introduce the topic to the bride's parents and are told to consult the woman. After she is consulted and gives her approval, the groom's parents return with hasi (a reed basket) as a sign that they are ready to proceed. If the bride's family accepts the basket, the groom's parents arrange to return later with jifu. Finally, the man's family pays the dowry (mahari), followed by the wedding ceremony. mahari was paid to the bride's family as a sign of respect.

This tradition has become less common. In many cases, couples elope. After staying together for some time, the woman is released to her parents for further training by her aunts on how to care for her family. Historically, divorces were rare and discouraged.

=== Names ===
Naming in the Pokomo community is based on the husband's family tree. The firstborn, if a boy, is given the name of the husband's father; if a girl, the name of the husband's mother. Subsequent boys take the names of the husband's brothers in birth order, while girls take the names of the husband's sisters in birth order. Some names are used by both boys and girls, with the prefix Ha added before a girl's name. For example, Babwoya (name for a man) becomes Habwoya (name for a woman). Names are also taken from plants and animals if the firstborn died during pregnancy or delivery, in the belief that this will offset bad omens and enable subsequent children to live to adulthood. Children with such names are referred to as Mwana Fwisa. Examples include Mabuke (banana suckers) and Nchui (cheetah). Names are also given to children born during specific seasons.

=== Song and dance ===
The Pokomo have various songs and dances, including:

- Kingika – a women's dance sung whenever a woman gives birth and is about to leave the house after finishing the mandatory confinement period to heal and breastfeed the baby.
- Miri – performed by young men and women at weddings and birthday ceremonies. During the performance, the young men and women compete with one another. It is complemented by Michirima and Mbumbumbu drums, a metal plate known as Upatsu and a Chivoti flute.
- Beni – performed primarily by the Ngatana subtribe of Wema to welcome visitors. It features a large drum accompanied by utasa and is unique to Wema village.
- Mwaribe – danced by young girls to the beat of a drum during circumcision ceremonies. The traditional costume is a grass skirt made from the fronds of the Doum Palm (Mkoma leaves), worn especially by boys.
- Kitoko – performed by everyone during weddings, births and joyful celebrations.
- Mela ya Walume (men's songs).
- Mela ya Kitoko – songs sung while working in the fields or paddling a canoe in the evenings. These songs resemble the "sundowner songs" that were traditionally sung when a canoe was full of cargo (bananas, mangoes, etc.) sailing downstream with little effort from the oar.
- Dulila – songs sung to correct the behaviour of an individual by shaming them for disgracing the community (Kudabha). These songs were mainly sung by groups of women who would approach the person who erred (Kadabha) and pinch them.

The Kenya national anthem is an African song whose tune is based on a Pokomo lullaby. The traditional lullaby lyrics are: Bee mdondo bee, mwana kalilani njoo mudye mwana ywehu alache kuliloo. Roughly translated, this means, "You animal, you animal, our child is crying, please come and eat it so that it can stop crying." The song was composed by Mzee Meza Morowa Galana of Makere village, Gwano, in Wenje division. The composer died on 12 November 2015 at age 96. The Pokomo use music to celebrate harvests, fishing, hunting, weddings, circumcisions and births.

=== Festivals ===
The Pokomo observe two main seasons: Sika and Kilimo. They traditionally used astronomical observations of the sky and moon to predict whether upcoming rains would be Mvula ya Masika (short rains), prompting the planting of fast-maturing crops, or Mvula ya Kilimo (long rains), prompting the planting of long-maturing crops and those requiring substantial water, such as rice.

=== Land tenure ===
Pokomo land stretches from Mbalambala to Kipini along both sides of the River Tana. The Pokomo occupy a large portion of Tana River County. Land was historically distributed by the Kijo and Gasa councils of elders to each sub-tribe, as indicated by the names of the villages they inhabit. Three types of land tenure systems are practiced among the Pokomo:

1. Mafumbo – in each clan, each family was allocated land stretching from one side of the river's flooding zone across to the other side. This was meant to avoid conflicts when the river changed its course.
2. Mihema ya Walume – these are undeveloped lands used by those who clear them. A family is shown an area to farm but must clear the forests within a certain time or lose the land to another family.
3. Bada – (loosely translated as "forest"), these areas were preserved for medicinal plants, firewood and building materials.

=== Cuisine ===
The Pokomo eat Tana river catfish (mtonzi, or mpumi for the largest), tilapia (ntuku), trout (ningu), eel (mamba) and crocodile (ngwena). Catfish are mainly boiled or sun-dried/smoked. Other food sources include plantains, palm tree seeds, bananas, peas and pumpkins.

The Pokomo depend on the flooding regime of the Tana to grow rice, bananas, green grams, beans and maize. The staple foods are rice and fish. Other traditional foodstuffs include matoli, cooked banana chips mixed with fish; marika, cooked banana mixed with fish and mashed together; konole, a cooked mixture of sifted maize and green grams/beans; and nkumbu, ash-baked or boiled banana. Sima (stiff cornmeal porridge) has become the staple Pokomo dish due to changes in river flooding regimes and weather patterns that no longer support rice cultivation.

== Governance and spiritual life ==
Traditional governance was led by a council of elders referred to as kijo. The three arms below the kijo are: (a) the judicial system referred to as Gasa; (b) the secretaries (executive assistants) referred to as the Wagangana; and (c) the Pokomo religious arm of the Kijo.

=== Kijo ===
The Kijo was a council of elders with the authority to excommunicate, imprison, or execute individuals found guilty by the Gasa. Execution was carried out by tying a heavy stone around the individual's neck and throwing them into the River Tana.

At certain times of the year, people would gather near the sacred places (Ngaji) at night to sing and dance. The Kijo leader would emerge from the sacred forest in the middle of the night, walking on stilts, wearing a white dress, and covering his face with a mask. He would walk around and dance to the sound of beating drums before returning to the forest, leaving the crowd believing their issues had been resolved spiritually. The main sacred places were Mji wa Walevu (Elders' village), Nkozi, and Laini Keya, located near Kone village.

Nkozi, the mother village of Kitere, was located in the flood plains of the River Tana. It was the centre of the Kijo. Before someone became a Mkijo, they underwent an activity known as Kuyumia Ngaji, which was only performed at Nkozi. Nkozi flooded twice a year, leading locals to move elsewhere. During flood seasons, people erected structures above the water level known as Mahandaki, where they would live. In 1946, the floods were unusually high, and residents were marooned for days; these floods were named Seli ya Nkozi (loosely translated as the Nkozi jail cell) because they covered areas that the yearly floods did not. It was said that haunting spirits (Maseha) lived at Kitere village.

According to local folklore, the ancestors of the Nkozi people could be heard talking at Kitere village, and these haunting spirits would sing and dance Miri (a Pokomo dance). They were said to sing a famous song from Ndera: mpanzi mpanzi kuniyawa... nakwenda Kitere... People from Mnazini village, south of Nkozi, would travel northwards toward Nkozi where the singing was heard, and those from Nkozi would head south toward Mnazini village. They would eventually meet on the way, wondering where the singing and dancing were originating. The singers were believed to be Maseha (spirit beings).

This discouraged settlement at Kitere village. However, after the 1946 floods covered Nkozi and its surroundings, the community fled in canoes and relocated to Kitere village. Before settling there, religious cleansing rituals were conducted to drive away the haunting spirits.

=== Gasa ===
The judicial arm of the Kijo is still headed by the Gasa. This is a council of elders responsible for administering justice. The Gasa is the only elder group still in existence and also provides political guidance. The Gasa has been formally recognised to dispense justice on land and family matters. There are two bodies in the Pokomo community, one for UP and the other for LP. The two combine to form a unified Gasa.

=== Wagangana ===
This group is composed of elders sent by the Kijo to deliver messages or summon individuals needed by the Kijo. For example, whenever the Kijo meets, they can send the Wagangana to collect food from community members; or whenever a punishment or order is issued by the Kijo, the Wagangana ensure it is implemented.

=== Pokomo religion: third arm of Kijo ===
Mulungu (UP) or Mungu (LP) is the universal being of the Pokomo, referring to God, the creator of everything. He is believed to bring upon the community both abundance and scarcity. The Pokomo traditionally had one religion, guided by a group of spiritual elders among the kijo. Kijo members would seek guidance at sacred prayer areas in the riverine forests.

Due to population growth and the introduction of Christianity and Islam, these sacred places were converted into farmlands. The former sacred place at mji wa walevu (translated as "village of the elders") is less than 1 km (0.62 mi) from the Hola Mission and Laza Trading Centres. The majority living in Hola Mission are Christians, and those in the Laza centre are Muslims.

=== Modern religions ===
The majority of the Upper Pokomo are Muslims. Conversion to Islam began in the latter half of the 19th century due to Swahili influence, and by the end of the century, most were Muslim. Most of the Lower Pokomos are Christians, beginning to convert to the religion in the late 1870s, and by 1914, they had almost exclusively converted.

== Notable people ==
- Phares Kuindwa – former head of civil service
- Yuda Komora – former Assistant Minister for Education and MP for Garsen
- Japhet Zacharia Kase – former Assistant Minister and MP for Galole
- Israel Lekwa Ddaiddo – former MP for Garsen
- Danson Mungatana – former Assistant Minister, former MP for Garsen, now Senator Tana River County
- Wilson Hiribae – former permanent secretary ministry of economic planning
- Nathan Oddo Hiribae – former District Commissioner, Deputy Speaker, and Ward Rep for Tana County and Kinakomba Ward
- Shari Martin – Gospel musician
- Mwaka Mungatana – prominent figure in the Buu community
