= Digo language =

Bantu language

Digo
- Chidigo
- Native to: Kenya, Tanzania
- Region: Mombasa and Kwale districts in Kenya; Muheza and Tanga districts in Tanzania
- Ethnicity: Digo people
- Native speakers: 580,000 (2009–2019)
- Language family: Niger–Congo?: Atlantic–Congo; Volta–Congo; Benue–Congo; Bantoid; Bantu; Northeast Coast Bantu; Sabaki; Mijikenda; Digo

Language codes
- ISO 639-3: dig
- Glottolog: digo1243
- Guthrie code: E.73

Digo (Chidigo) is a Bantu language spoken primarily along the East African coast between Mombasa and Tanga by the Digo people of Kenya and Tanzania. The ethnic Digo population has been estimated at around 360,000 (Mwalonya et al. 2004), most of whom are presumably speakers of the language. All adult speakers of Digo are bilingual in Swahili, East Africa's lingua franca. The two languages are closely related, and Digo also has much vocabulary borrowed from neighbouring Swahili dialects.

== Classification ==
The classification and sub-classification of Digo provides a good example of the difficulty sometimes faced by linguists in differentiating languages and dialects. Most contemporary authorities follow Nurse and Hinnebusch (1993) in classifying Digo as a dialect of Mijikenda, one of the constituent languages of the Sabaki group of Northeast Coast Bantu. The Mijikenda dialects are indeed mutually intelligible, though they are conventionally treated as separate languages. Digo is a member of the southern Mijikenda sub-group, and is most closely related to its neighbours Duruma and Rabai. It is, however, felt by speakers to be sufficiently different from other Mijikenda dialects to deserve its own orthography and literature.

== Dialects ==
Digo speakers recognise in turn a number of named varieties or dialects of their language. These are:

- Chinondo (Northern Digo), spoken along the south Kenya coast between Likoni (south Mombasa) and Msambweni (Hinnebusch 1973);
- Ungu (or Lungu, Southern Digo), spoken on the coastal strip south of Msambweni and across the border into northern Tanzania (Hinnebusch 1973);
- Ts’imba, spoken in the Shimba Hills of Kenya between Vuga in the east and Ng’onzini in the west (Walsh 2006); and
- Tsw’aka (or Chw’aka), spoken in and around the village of the same name on the Shimoni Peninsula of Kenya (Möhlig 1992, Nurse & Walsh 1992).

Tsw’aka was once thought to have been a local variety of the Vumba dialect of Swahili, but is now considered to be a variety of Digo in the process of shifting to Vumba. Some assimilated Segeju and Degere are also said to speak their own separate varieties of Digo, presumably as a consequence of language shift (Nurse & Walsh 1992).

== Orthography and literature ==
Digo speakers usually write their language using an alphabet based on the Latin alphabet used for Swahili, with additional combinations of letters representing some of the sounds that are distinctive to Digo (e.g. 'ph' for the voiced bilabial fricative or approximant). This has been developed further by the Digo Language and Literacy Project of Bible Translation and Literacy (East Africa). The project has produced basic literacy materials and published a Digo-English-Swahili Dictionary using the new orthography (Mwalonya et al. 2004) as well as a linguistic description in A Grammar of Digo (Nicolle 2013). The Digo New Testament was finished in 2007. All of these materials are based on the Northern Digo dialect spoken in Kenya.

One hundred Digo proverbs have been collected and published by Margaret Wambere Ireri, with translations into Swahili, English, and French.
