= Degere =

Mijikenda-speaking ethnic group of Kenya and Tanzania

The Degere are a Mijikenda-speaking group of former hunter-gatherers of Kenya and Tanzania, now settled along the Ramisi, Mwena and Umba rivers, with a few along the coast. They may number no more than a few hundred to at most a few thousand. They are believed to be related to, possibly descended from, the Oromo-speaking Waata. They are variously reported to speak Duruma, Digo, a similar Mijikenda dialect of their own, or to speak Mijikenda with grammatical errors (such as incorrect verb tenses) much as the Waata do when they speak Mijikenda.

== Language ==
Old Degere
- Native to: Kenya, Tanzania
- Region: southern Kwale District, Kenya and northern Muheza District, Tanzania
- Ethnicity: Degere
- Era: attested 1959
- Language family: unclassified

Language codes
- ISO 639-3: None (mis)
- Glottolog: dege1245

A former arrow-poison trader reported that when he visited the Degere at Mkoseka in northern Tanzania in 1959, among themselves they spoke their own language, which he said was similar to Waata. He was able, with difficulty, to recall some words and phrases, along with their Waata equivalents, and equated the language with both Waata and the language of the 'Dorobo' hunter-gatherers on the other side of the Usambara Mountains. Half of the words were clearly related to Waata, though with some differences in pronunciation and meaning, but the rest were obscure and could not be identified with a known language, though this was complicated by the difficulty of recall, and possibility that errors or distortions crept in over time.

The more obscure of these words, remembered nearly 30 years later, include,

sako 'girl' (i.e., before having children)
sakaya 'woman' (with children)
gobina 'blood'
mada 'meat'
mat̠indo 'milk'
bulabula 'bee'

Walsh (1990, 1992/1993) concludes it is possible that the former Degere language was a variety of Oromo that had been influenced by a still earlier language of theirs, or by the language of the hunter-gathering neighbors. The Waata say they had a language of their own before shifting to Oromo, so another possibility is that the Degere split from the Waata and traveled south, away from Oromo influence, before that shift was complete, and so retained part of that earlier language in their lexicon.

The name 'Degere' is the root of the Mijikenda name, mudegere (sg) / adegere (pl), from the verb kudegere 'to roam', presumably reflecting their former hunter-gatherer economy. The establishment of the Mkomazi Game Reserve in Tanzania in 1951 may have accelerated their abandonment of hunting.
