= Waata =

Oromo-speaking people of southeast Kenya

The Waata (Waat, Watha), or Sanye, are an Oromo-speaking people of Kenya and former hunter-gatherers. They share the name Sanye with the neighboring Dahalo.

== See also ==
- Degere
