= Kasemeni =

Kasemeni is a sub-location in Kwale County, Kenya.
