= Kazungu Kambi =

Kenyan politician

Samuel Kazungu Kambi is a Kenyan politician born in Kwale county. He belongs to the Party of National Unity and was elected to represent the Kaloleni Constituency in the National Assembly of Kenya at the 2007 Kenyan parliamentary election. On 23 May 2013 he was nominated by president Uhuru Kenyatta to cabinet to the ministry of Labour and Social Services awaiting approval from the National Assembly of Kenya after the vetting process. Kazungu holds a Bachelor of Arts Degree in Development Studies from The University of Eastern Africa Baraton.
