= Chonyi people =

Kenyan tribe

Chonyi
Total population
- 198,653

Regions with significant populations
- Kenya

Religion
- African Traditional Religion, Christianity, Islam

Related ethnic groups
- Mijikenda, other Bantu peoples

The Chonyi, also referred to as Achonyi/VaChonyi (A person from this tribe may also be referred to as a Mchonyi/Muchonyi), are one of the smaller tribes of the Mijikenda on the coast of Kenya.

== Locations ==
Chonyi Community is the third largest subtribe among the Mijikenda after Giriama and Digo. Their populations can be found in the villages of Swerelanka - Mwembe Swere, Lutsangani, Chidutani, Kolongoni, Dzitsoni, Bungu, Silala, Gandini, Tsalu, Mtundani, Mesheta, Vitsangaliweni, Lutsanga, Muho Mkulu, Mwembe Tsungu, Matandale, Kasemeni, Tsagwa Bomu, Bundacho, Ziani, Karimboni, Chasimba, Galanema, Mwele, Bodoi, Chigojoni, Dindiri, Mitulani, Danicha, Mandiri, Mapawa, Mazuka, Mbogolo, Kapecha, Junju, Katikirieni, Podzoni, Mwarakaya, Pingilikani, Vwevwesi, Mafisini, Ng'ombeni, Chizingo, Chikambala, Shariani, Kayanda, Mwakuhenga, Ngamani, Bembo, Kasidi, Kolewa, Sirini, Chengoni, Chije, Banda-ra-Salama, Gongoni, Bomani, Dindiri, Makata, Kaole, Mtepeni, Chodari, Shaurimoyo, Mbomboni, Chilobole and Mbuyuni. They are also found in recent settlement areas of Kilifi District, such as Chumani, some parts of Malindi, Mavueni, Tezo, Roka, Maweni, Vipingo, Mtondia Takaungu, Majengo and Mtwapa. In Mombasa County Chonyi People Are Dominat In Nyali, Kashani, Vikwatani, Miritini, Junda,Kiembeni Bamburi, Shanzu, Bonmbolulu and Kisauni Barsheba.The Capital City Of Chonyi Community Is MTWAPA & MAVUENI {citation needed|date=August 1984.

== Origin ==
According to a Chonyi myth, the Achonyi originated in Singwaya (or Shungwaya) like any other Bantu, which was to the north of the Somali coast. They were driven south by the Oromo until they reached their present locations along the ridge, where they built their kayas within a protective setting.

The historical accuracy of this myth is controversial between those who believe that the Mijikenda originated from a single point in the north and those who believe that they do not have a single origin, but migrated primarily from the south.

== Culture ==
Where "kiti" means chair in Swahili, "Kihi" is Giriama and "Chihi" is Chonyi. Similar, but recognizably different languages. Like the other Mijikenda tribes, the Chonyi live in settlements known as "Kaya." The original "Kaya Chonyi" is located on a forested hill top. In the center of the Kaya were shrines where the elders or "atumia" would pray to god or "Mulungu".

The Chonyi's traditional music, known as the Chiring'ong'o, features the 'Marimba' (xylophone), rare in Kenyan music.

Most Chonyi are farmers. They cultivate crops like maize and raise cattle. Some Chongyi also work in cotton, sugar cane, or sisal plantations.

=== Naming ===
The naming of the Chonyi people is symbolic, for example, Mbeyu is a name of a girl, mbeyu meaning seeds for planting. Tsuma means a boy who is a provider. Nyamvula is a girl's name meaning a rainy season, born during times of rain. Mnyazi being a girl's name meaning a sower. Mokoli is a boy name meaning a helpful person. Names are also often repeated in the family. The names of the father's uncles and aunts would become the names of his children, this would be repeated with the mother's side of the family.

Once the names from both sides of the family have been used, the parents can choose original names. Another interesting fact about names is that the first name of the father will become the last name of the rest of the family. An example would be if one's name is Munga Jira, Munga would be the last name of his children and wife. Although it is a tradition to name your family in this way, it is a slowly fading practice.

== Sources ==
- Glen Bailey (1980). Papers in International Studies: Africa series. Ohio University, Center for International Studies. p. 86. ISBN 978-0-89680-104-2.
- Mela Tomaselli (1 January 2004). The Magic Pot: Folk Tales and Legends of the Giriama of Kenya. Paulines Publications Africa. p. 22. ISBN 978-9966-21-950-3.
