= Mijikenda peoples =

Group of nine tribes found in Kenya

Mijikenda
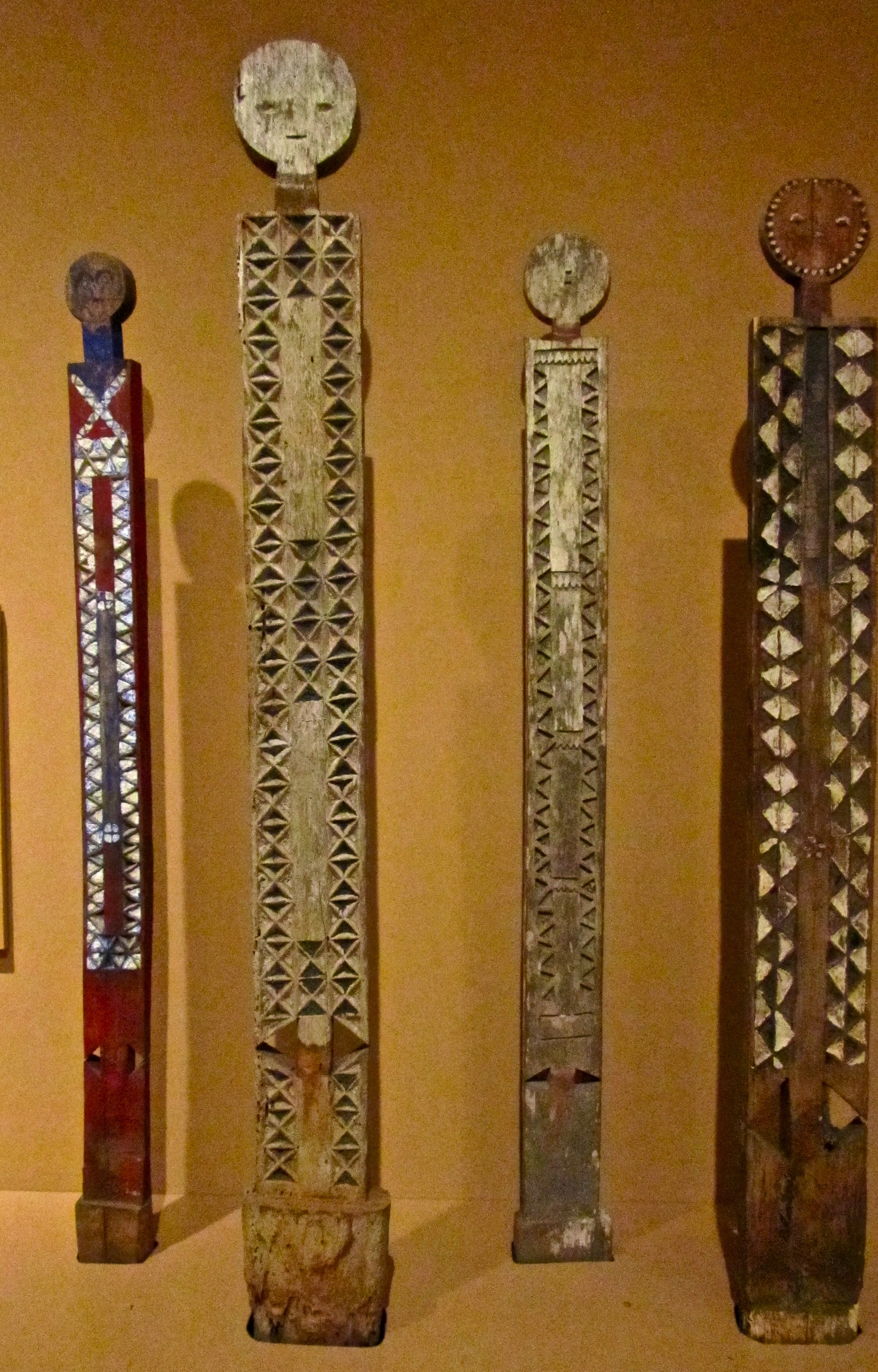

Total population
- 2,488,691 (Kenya)

Regions with significant populations
- Kenya Tanzania

Languages
- Mijikenda • Swahili • English

Related ethnic groups
- Pokomo, Chonyi, Digo, Giriama, Jibana, Swahili, other Bantu peoples

Mijikenda ("the Nine Tribes"; Swahili: Wamijikenda) are a group of nine related Bantu ethnic groups inhabiting the coast of Kenya, between the Sabaki and the Umba rivers, in an area stretching from the border with Tanzania in the south to the border near Somalia in the north. Archaeologist Chapuruka Kusimba contends that the Mijikenda formerly resided in coastal cities, but later settled in Kenya's hinterlands to avoid submission to dominant Portuguese forces that were then in control. Historically, these Mijikenda ethnic groups have been called the Nyika or Nika by outsiders. It is a derogatory term meaning "bush people."

The nine ethnic groups that make up the Mijikenda peoples are the Chonyi, Kambe, Duruma, Kauma, Ribe, Rabai, Jibana, Giriama, and Digo. The Digo are southern Mijikenda while the others are northern Mijikenda. The Digo are also found in Tanzania due to their proximity to the common border.

== Culture ==
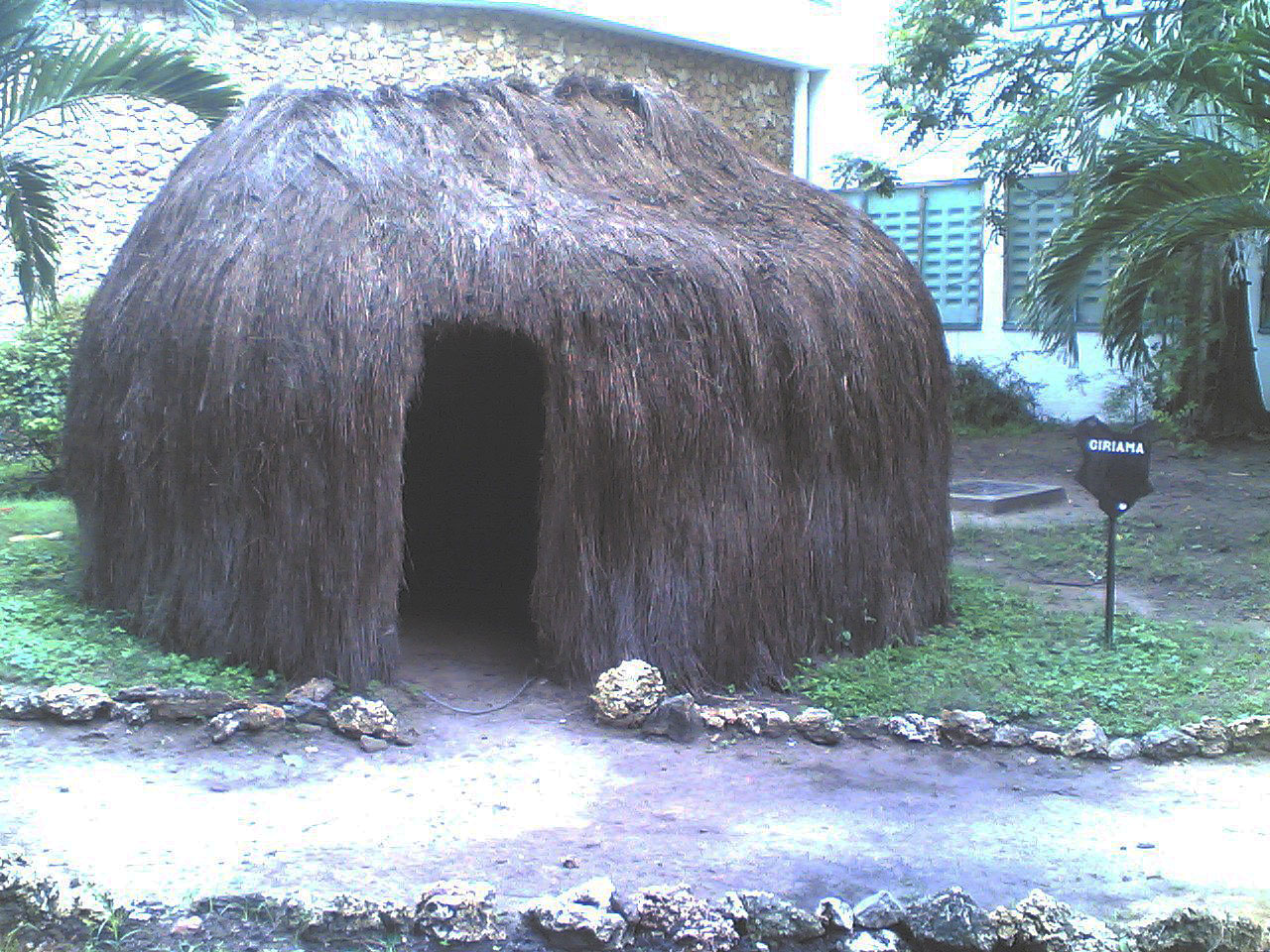
Replica of a Giriama hut

Each of the Mijikenda groups has a sacred forest, a kaya, which is a place of prayer. Eleven of the approximately 30 kaya forests have been inscribed together as a UNESCO World Heritage Site, the Sacred Mijikenda Kaya Forests. Mijikenda people are also known for creating wooden kigango funerary statues which have been displayed in museums around the world and sold in the international art market. These artifacts were at one time legally sold by reputable art galleries and curio shops during the early 1970s to the 1990s; however, other kigango statues were found to have been stolen from cultural sites and illegally sold.

Each Mijikenda ethnic group has its own unique customs and dialects of the Mijikenda language, although the dialects are similar to each other and to Swahili.

== History and ethnography of the Mijikenda peoples ==
=== Origins ===
The orthodox view of the Mijikenda's origins is that the Mijikenda peoples originated in Shungwaya (Singwaya) and various other parts of the northern Somali coast, and were pushed south by the Galla (Oromo) and reached Kenya around the 16th century. This view of the origins of the Mijikenda people was argued by Thomas Spear in the book The Kaya Complex, and was also confirmed by many Mijikenda oral traditions. Furthermore, oral tradition states that the precise reason for the Galla pushing the Mijikenda from Shungwaya was the murder of a Galla Tribesman by a Mijikenda youth, and the Mijikenda tribes subsequent refusal to pay compensation to the Galla. However it has also been theorized that the Mijikenda peoples may have originated in roughly the same places they currently reside. One possible explanation for this is that the Mijikenda peoples adopted the Singwaya narrative in order to create an ethnic identity that allowed them to create a relationship to the Swahili who also claimed Singwaya origins. Oral tradition also states that the Mijikenda peoples split into six separate peoples during this southern migration after they were driven out of Singwaya. These six groups would go on to settle the original six kaya.

At the turn of the 17th century the Mijikenda settled six fortified hilltop kaya, where they made their homesteads. These original six kaya were later expanded into nine kaya. The origin legend serves as a narrative of a real migration that happened at a specific point in time to a real place, but also serves as a narrative of a mythical migration that took place through a cultural time from a common origin. It promotes a higher unity among the group of the nine individual ethnic groups that makes up the Mijikenda peoples. Singwaya is considered by the Mijikenda to be their common origin point, and the birthplace of their language and traditions.

This origin legend also defines some of the relationships of the ethnic groups that make up the Mijikenda peoples, for example one version of the oral tradition states that the Digo were the first to leave Singwaya and thus are accepted as the other groups as senior, then the Ribe left, followed by the Giriama, the Chonyi, and the Jibana.

=== Kayas ===
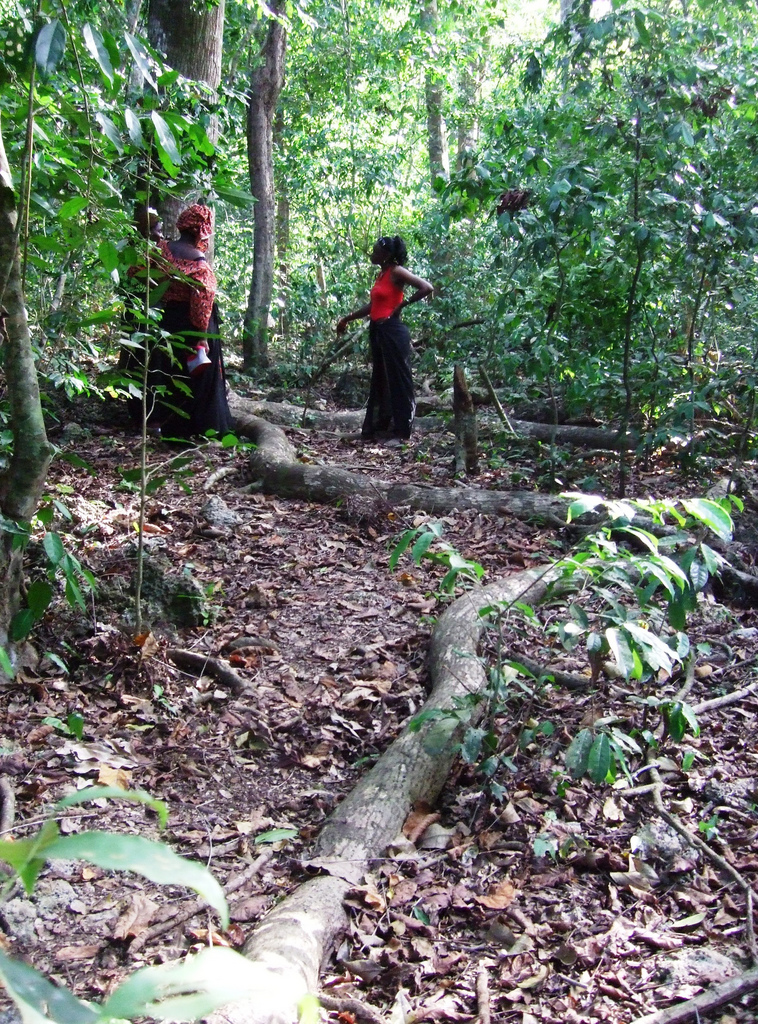

The kayas were the first homesteads of the Mijikenda peoples after their exodus from Singwaya. Oral tradition states that it was the Digo who were the first to migrate southward and establish the first kaya. The period after the establishment of the kaya and was portrayed as a time of stability by these oral traditions, this period ended in the mid to late 19th century with the rise of colonialism. The kaya also represented an important political symbol to the Mijikenda peoples, as well as being an important cultural symbol to the Mijikenda peoples. The political symbolism of the kaya also played a part in the resistance to colonialism for the Mijikenda peoples. Sometime during the late 19th century the Mijikenda peoples began leaving their kaya homesteads and settling areas elsewhere.

The layout of the kaya settlements usually had centrally positioned areas devoted to leadership and worship, with other areas devoted to initiation ceremonies, areas for developing magic and medicine, and areas devoted to burials and entertainment placed around them. The forests of the kaya surrounding the settlement acted as a buffer between the settlement itself and the outside world. As the populations of these kaya grew, security grew which lead to a period of stability which allowed the Mijikenda people to spread outwards along the coasts and southwards along the border of Tanzania. Eventually all nine of the original kaya were abandoned as the Mijikenda settled elsewhere, however the importance of these kaya did not diminish, and they were still held as sacred sites.

=== Slavery ===
During the precolonial period the Mijikenda people were horticulturalists and pastoralists and had well established trade with the coastal Swahili peoples. The Hinterland people (The Mijikenda, Pokomo, and Segeju peoples) grew food that the coastal Swahili people depended on. This trade relationship was based on economic, military, and political alliances. The Mijikenda peoples even participated in Mombasa politics.

However, during the colonial period under the British power was given to the Coastal Swahili peoples and the Arab peoples of the area. The Coastal strip of land near the Hinterlands was recognized as belonging to the Sultan of Oman, subsequently the Mijikenda people could only go there as squatters and were in danger of expulsion at any time. The colonial power over the coastal areas also extended to the Hinterland regions where the Mijikenda people resided.

One group of Mijikenda peoples, Known as the Giriama peoples were mistrustful of the British colonial government, as prior to Britain's colonization of the coastal and hinterland areas this group had had its people captured by Arab and Swahili slave traders during the 19th century.

Differing accounts of this period exist, with some sources stating that these enslaved Giriama peoples participated in a complex patron-client relationship which was important for the establishment of large scale plantations on the East African coast. This account goes on to say that these enslaved Giriama peoples were integrated into Swahili and Arab land owning families and were sometimes referred to as dependents rather than slaves. Overall the treatment of these slaves was not very harsh, due to the ease of escape, the kin-based patron-client system, and Islam's prohibition of harsh treatment of slaves. This is contrasted by the treatment of the slaves on the nearby islands such as Pemba or Zanzibar where slaves were treated more harshly. As slave ownership declined on the East African coast many of the Ex-slaves moved on to find employment as manual laborers on their former master's plantations and were paid a portion of the crop as compensation in a similar patron-client relationship as before.

However some accounts state that the slavery that the Giriama people endured was harsher than was previously believed. Enslaved Giriama people were known to have fled by the hundreds to any sanctuary they could, in some cases seeking refuge in Christian Missionary stations, in other cases fleeing to runaway slave settlements. Additionally the idea that the transition from ex-slaves to manual laborers was made difficult due to fear among members of the colonial government that the fugitive and freed slaves would start a rebellion.
