= Kauma =

Kauma is a surname. Notable people with the surname include:

- Pia Kauma (born 1966), Finnish politician
- Victoria Kauma (born 1962), Namibian politician

== See also ==
- Kaurna
