= Mariakani =

Town in Kenya

Coordinates: 03°52′00″S 39°28′00″E

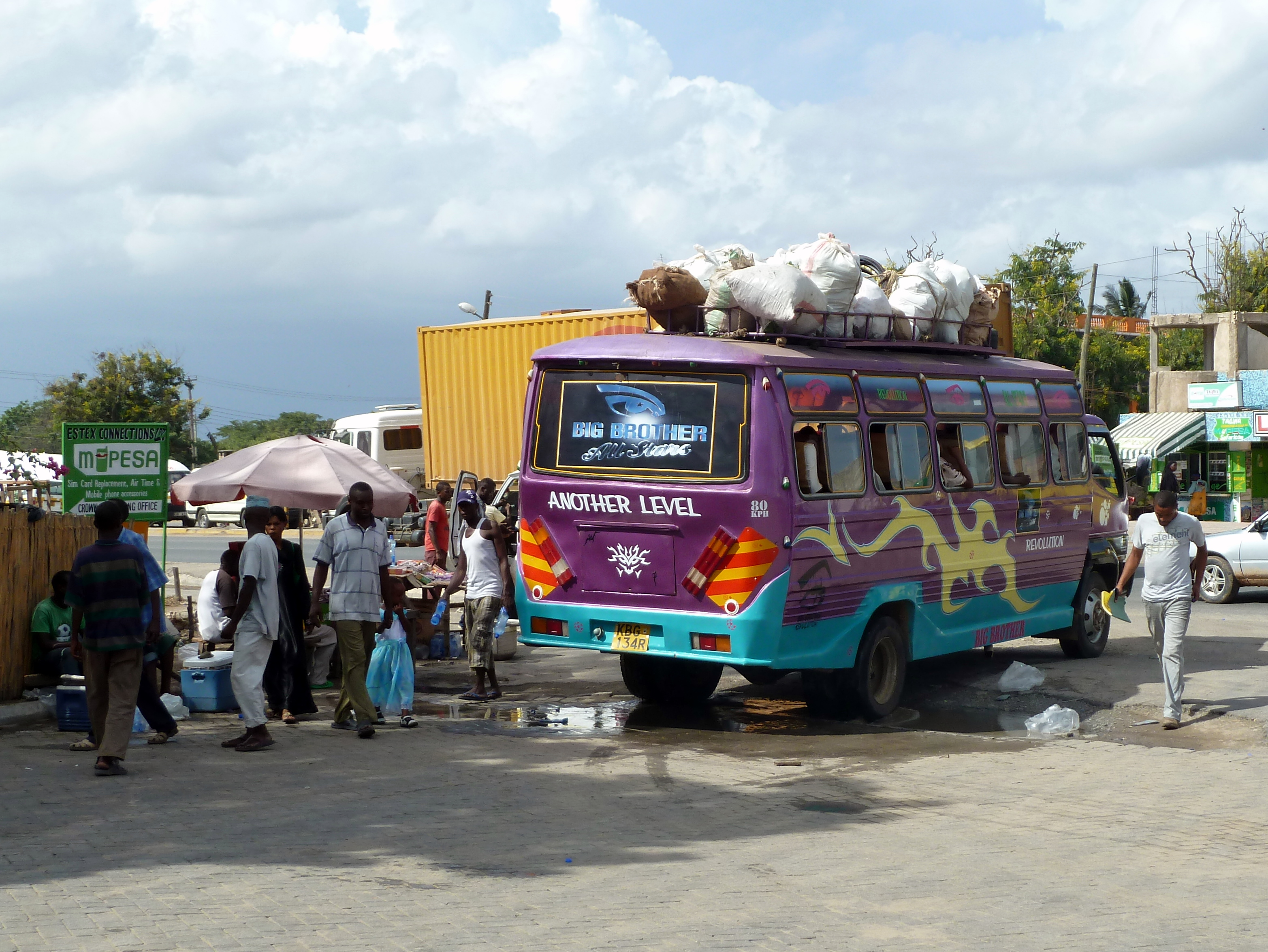
Mariakani

Mariakani is a town in Kenya lying on the boundary of Kaloleni and Kinango subcounties (formerly Kilifi and Kwale respectively) in the former Coast Province and Now Coast Region of Kenya, 36 kilometres northwest of the port city of Mombasa.

== Origin ==
The origin of the centre is set in the 20th Century. Mariakani Town emerge not long time ago as it is a town that came after Mombasa and Voi Town in now coast region. after Kenya-Uganda Railway was Finished. traders threw away their weaponry at this spot as a peace sign when approaching Mombasa as the Sultan of that time did not allow traders to enter the island with any kind of weaponry. Therefore, the area became known as Mariakani which translates to "the place of quivers". riaka is the Mijikenda word for quiver.

== Administration during colonial period ==
The administrative areas which make up Mariakani today were shared by the Durumas, Chonyi, Digos, Giriamas and Coastal Immigrants Tribes like The Akambas, The Gikuyus, Amerus Etc. The British colonists considered it more prudent to administer the dominant ethnic groups separately. The Kilifi county side had a Giriama to take care of the interest of the two ethnic groups, whereas on the Kwale County side, i.e. the Mwavumbo area, was another pair of chiefs to represent the Duruma people. The last of the chief was the late Chief Johnson Mwero Mwaiga from Matumbi. From the 1960s onwards and especially after Kenya achieved independence, the practice was discontinued to give way to one chief for the entire area. The first chief of the area in Mwavumbo was Mkalla Mwero from Matumbi.

== Today ==
Most of the business activities are done on the Kaloleni side owing to the shift of transport preference to Mombasa-Nairobi Highway rather than the rail line and station. However, earlier business and development endeavours were done jointly by both side of the boundary. These include the Mariakani High school, the Kwale-Kilifi Milk Scheme Cooperative of the 1960s, slaughter houses among others.

The Kwale County side is part of Mwavumbo area and is not widely known. Its population is dominantly Durumas and Coastal Immigrants like kambas, kikuyus, and Kisii tribe, the descendants of the explorers' scouts and long-distance traders.

Mariakani (Kilifi county side) hosts a town council with a population of 67,984, of whom 10,987 are classified urban (1999 census). The town council consists of five wards: Kaliangombe, Kawala, Mariakani, Mugumo-wa-Patsa, Tsangatsini. All of them are located within Kaloleni Constituency. Central Mariakani is located in Mariakani location of Kaloleni division of Kilifi district.

From at least 2019, 21 Kenya Rifles (Kenya Army Infantry) has been located at Mariakani Barracks, reporting to 6 Brigade at Garissa.

== Transport ==
Mariakani has a station on the Kenyan Railway system.

Mariakani also benefits from motorcycles popularly known as ‘Boda Boda’ motorcycle owners charge a fee to transport passengers from one place to another.

== See also ==
- Railway stations in Kenya
- Transport in Kenya
