= Kambe =

Kambe is a surname. Notable people with the surname include:

- Arve Kambe (born 1974), Norwegian politician
- Sugao Kambe (born 1961), Japanese football player and manager
