= Shungwaya =

Shungwaya (also Shingwaya) is an origin myth of the Mijikenda peoples. Traditions known collectively as the "Shungwaya myth" describe a series of migrations of Bantu peoples dating to the 12th–17th centuries from a region to the north of the Tana River. However according to Rodger F. Morton, coastal traditions recorded prior to 1897 indicate that the Shungwaya tradition entered Mijikenda oral literature only after this date and is therefore of doubtful veracity. These Bantu migrants were held to have been speakers of Sabaki Bantu languages. Other Bantu ethnic groups, smaller in number, are also suggested to have been part of the migration. From Shungwaya, the Mount Kenya Bantu (Kamba, Kikuyu, Meru, Embu, and Mbeere) are then proposed to have broke away and migrated from there some time before the Oromo onslaught. Shungwaya appears to have been, in its heyday, a multi-ethnic settlement with extensive trade networks. In the 13th century perhaps this settlement was subjected to a full scale invasion of Cushitic speaking Oromo peoples from he Horn of Africa. From the whole corpus of these traditions, it has been argued that Shungwaya comprised a large, multi-ethnic community.

The "Zhongli" (中理) of Zhao Rukuo's Zhu Fan Zhi (13th century) may be a Chinese transcription of Shungwaya. From Zhao's description, the place seems to be in the south of modern Somalia.
