= Giriama people =

Kenyan ethnic group

Giriama
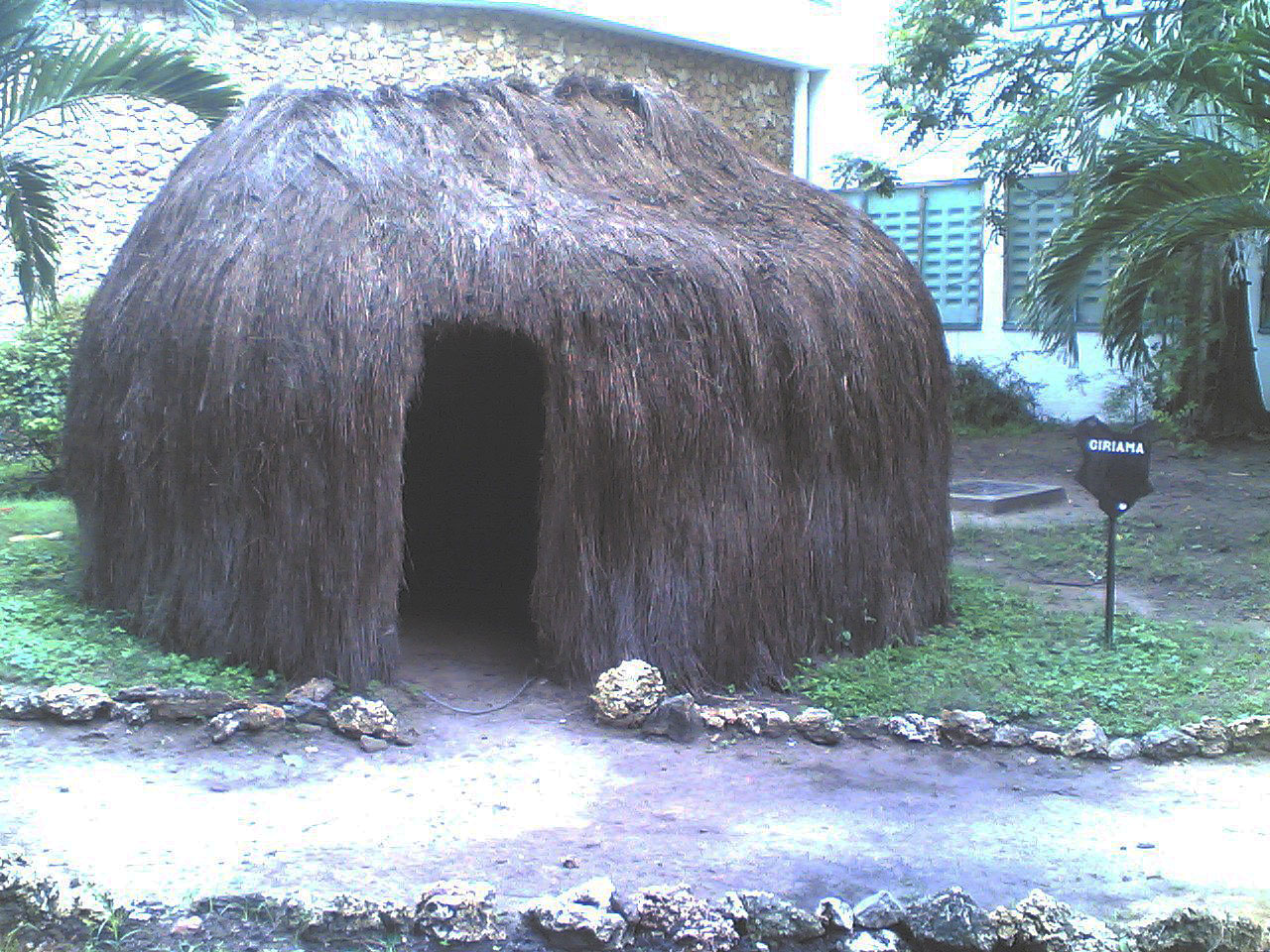

Total population
- 1,007,653

Regions with significant populations
- Kenya

Religion
- Majority: African Traditional Religion, Christianity; Minority: Islam

Related ethnic groups
- Mijikenda, other Bantu peoples

The Giriama (also called Giryama) are one of the nine ethnic groups that make up the Mijikenda (which literally translates to "nine towns").

The Mijikenda occupy the coastal strip extending from Lamu in the north to the Kenya–Tanzania border in the south and approximately 30 km (19 mi) inland. The Giriama inhabit the area bordered by the coastal cities of Mombasa and Malindi and the inland towns of Mariakani and Kaloleni.

The Giriama are subdivided into clans that include Thoya, Mweni, Nyundo and Nyale. They practised active resistance against the British colonial government.

Since the late 20th century, the Giriama have extended their living space down to the coast. As of the 21st century, they make up a portion of service employees in the growing tourism centres. Education programmes initiated by the state have included the building of central primary schools along the coastal roads, and school attendance has become compulsory for all children up to the age of 12. The migration of Giriama to places such as Takaungu and Mtwapa has allowed them to access paid labour, making them a part of the local workforce that was once dominated by the Chonyi.

The relationship of the Giriama to other Mijikenda groups such as the Ribe, Rabai, Digo and Duruma is relatively loose. The Kamba and Jibana have mixed with the coastal population, with only a few villages sustaining their distinct identities. The Kauma have also been largely assimilated. As of 2011, the area around Kilifi Creek was inhabited by a population that was nearly 90 percent Giriama.

== History ==
The Giriama people are a Coastal Bantu community believed to have migrated from Shungwaya, a location near Fort Dumford in present-day Somalia. They migrated southwards towards the coastal region of Kenya due to conflicts with other communities. They lacked a cooperative political organisation until the late 1940s when they assumed a collective political identification by choosing the name Mijikenda and forming the Mijikenda Union. At the top of the traditional Giriama hierarchy are the Kambi, a council of elders who reside in Kaya Fungo, which serves as the highest court of appeal for social, political and civic matters. Below the Kambi are spiritual leaders tasked with spreading religious influence and practising rituals.

The Giriama traditionally engaged in agriculture, rearing cattle, growing millet, producing cotton and fishing in the Indian Ocean. They were involved in foreign trade, exchanging goods such as iron for cloth from the Swahili and Arabs. The Giriama rebelled against pressure from foreigners, including the Galla, Swahili, Maasai and Arabs. Under pressure, they sometimes migrated to new lands, negotiated with their opponents or violently resisted.

=== Giriama uprising ===
The Giriama were involved in the Kenyan resistance of 1913–1914. The British colonial government attempted to use the Giriama as a source of forced labour for cash crop plantations on the coast of Kenya. The colonial government aimed to co-opt the Giriama through their traditional political organisation based on councils of elders.

The Giriama opposed these policies and instigated a rebellion. They lacked the hierarchical and bureaucratic structures typically associated with organised rebellion. Their initial response was based on past experiences with independent warlords who pillaged the coast. The arrival of foreigners who imposed taxes, censuses, forced labour and new commercial regulations was disruptive to the local population. Furthermore, the British policies conflicted with Giriama institutions, particularly regarding the sacred kaya settlements.

The Giriama council of elders was unsuccessful in rescinding the British policies as they could not draw on a permanent military system, nor did they have a political bureaucracy to organise all Giriama people. The British suppressed the revolt using superior weaponry. The conflict severely impacted the Giriama population and economy.

== Culture ==
=== Language ===
The two main languages spoken by the Giriama are KiGiriama (Giriama, Giryama) and KiSwahili (Swahili). KiGiriama belongs to the Mijikenda Bantu dialect cluster, while KiSwahili also belongs to the broader Bantu language family.

In 1891, William Ernest Taylor, a missionary of the Church Missionary Society in East Africa during the 1880s, published a Giriama vocabulary along with a description of the language and a selection of traditional tales and riddles in Giriama with English translations. The book includes five traditional stories: Katsungula na Simba (The Little Hare and the Lion); Fisi na Simba na Katsungula (The Hyena, the Lion, and the Little Hare); K'uku na Katsungula (The Fowl and the Little Hare); Kuononga kwa Muche (The Havoc Wrought by the Woman); and Kuandika kwa Kufwa (The Origin of Death).

Some examples of Giriama riddles include:

- Fw-alume ahahu, akiuka mumwenga, k'afurya wari. Ni mafigo. Rikiuka mwenga garya mairi mut'u k'aadima kugit'ira chakurya. ("We are three men but when one of us goes away, we get no rice to eat. It is the three stones of the hearth. When one is gone, a man cannot cook food with the two that remain.") (#6)
- K'akilumika. Ni kikokora. ("It is not to be bitten. It is the elbow.") (#8)
- Magoma mairi lwanda-ni. Ni mahombo. ("Two cows in the open field. It is the breasts.") (#18)

=== Kinship ===
The Giriama kinship system is reflected in their language. Terms of address between alternate generations are reciprocated by members of the same sex or are reciprocally equivalent between members of different sexes. Between adjacent generations, certain terms are reciprocal (e.g. mother's brother/sister's son, parent-in-law/daughter's husband) but are otherwise reciprocated with different terms. The eldest of a group of brothers is addressed with respect forms and behaviour, unlike other brothers who use familiar forms.

The Giriama have numerous affinal terms. Siblings, parallel cousins and cross cousins may all be referred to by the same term. There is bifurcate merging in the immediately ascending generation, meaning a father and father's brother are called by the same name (but not the mother's brother), and a mother and mother's sister are called by the same name (but not the father's sister). Marriage may occur with all cousins except a patrilateral parallel cousin and into all clans except the patri-clan.

=== Traditions ===
The Giriama people organise themselves into family groups that are patrilineal. This tradition stems from their history dating back over 150 years when Giriama settlements were located in fortified cities called kayas. These cities were governed by elders. By the time of British colonisation, these kayas remained largely as cultural symbols inhabited by a few elders.

Over time, the Giriama have expanded the area they inhabit, leading to the disappearance of central governing systems. Leadership was replaced by homestead elders making decisions for their families. In contemporary households, a patriarch, his wives, his sons and their families live together as a homestead composed of several houses. Traditionally, men are responsible for providing food and working, while female members of the family are tasked with household duties. In Giriama culture, the younger generation is expected to respect their elders, who hold positions of authority.

=== Dress and weddings ===
Traditional Giriama marriages are often arranged by parents, involving a bride price that is typically paid in the form of liquor. Giriama weddings typically involve music, dancing and gifts. As a blessing, the fathers-in-law spit water onto the chests of the new couple.

Historically, the Giriama traded their iron for foreign clothing. Today, while some of the younger generation have adopted Western dress, most Giriama wear imported cloth wrappers. Elders traditionally wear a waist cloth and carry a walking stick, and some Giriama women wear traditional short, layered skirts that resemble ballet tutus.

=== Economy ===
The Giriama are primarily farmers. Their economy historically relied on the rearing and distribution of cattle, goats and sheep. They also grew crops for both local consumption and the foreign market, such as cassava, maize, cotton, millet, rice, coconuts and oil palms. The majority of their trade was conducted with Arabs and Swahili merchants, exchanging crops and iron for foreign goods such as beads and overseas textiles.

== Religion ==
The majority of the Giriama adhere to their traditional beliefs or Christianity, while a minority practise Islam. The Giriama people also experience spirit possession.

The Giriama traditionally believed in a supreme spiritual god called Mulingu. Their traditional religion lacked priests, territorial spirit-possession cults or innovative leaders to translate old customs (such as the eradication of witchcraft). Instead, it revolved around conversion practices, spirit discourses, spirit possession, divination, ritual code-switching and other ritual forms.

As part of their belief in Mulingu, the Giriama would carve hardwood in the shape of human beings called vigango, which were offered as sacrifices to ward off calamities such as sickness and environmental dangers. While traditional Giriama religion is still practised, a portion of the population has converted to either Christianity or Islam. The Giriama have been pressured to convert to Islam by Swahili and Arab patrons, employers and prospective kin-by-marriage. For decades, these pressures have taken supernatural as well as social forms.

== See also ==
- Mekatilili Wa Menza, female Giriama activist.
- Malaika Firth (born 1994), fashion model.

== Bibliography ==
- Brantley, C. (1981), The Giriama and Colonial Resistance in Kenya, 1800–1920, University of California Press
- Beckloff, R.; Merriam, S. (2009), Local Agricultural Knowledge Construction Among the Giriama People of Rural Coastal Kenya, The University of Georgia
- McIntosh, J. (March 2004), "Reluctant Muslims: Embodied Hegemony and Moral Resistance in a Giriama Spirit Possession Complex", The Journal of the Royal Anthropological Institute, 10 (1): 91–112
- McIntosh, J. (2009), The Edge of Islam: Power, Personhood, and Ethnoreligious Boundaries on the Kenya Coast, Durham; London: Duke University Press
- Parkin, D. (1991), The Sacred Void: Spatial Images of Work and Ritual among the Giriama of Kenya, Cambridge Studies in Social and Cultural Anthropology, Cambridge: Cambridge University Press
- Patterson, D. (1970), The Giriama Risings of 1913–1914, Boston University African Studies Centre
- Temu, A. (1971), "The Giriama War, 1914–1915", Journal of Eastern African Research & Development, Gideon Were Publications
