= Jibana people =

Jibana
Total population
- 38,466

Regions with significant populations
- Kenya

Religion
- African Traditional Religion, Christianity, Islam

Related ethnic groups
- Mijikenda, other Bantu peoples

The Jibana or Dzihana people are an ethnic group from Kenya and a subgroup of the Mijikenda. There are 38,466 of them, all speakers of Kijibana. The Jibana community lives in Kaloleni subcounty of Kilifi county. Like the other Mijikenda communities, they have an organized clans which trace their origin from the ancient ancestors.

== Culture ==
Their economic activities are mainly farming, hunting and gathering, and cattle keeping. Most Jibana people depend on maize farming as their substantial food. Their political system consists of a family where the father is the head. The father is responsible for provision of food and security to the family as well as a councilor.

Religiously, they are traditional believers believing in the God called Mulungu and execute their prayers in sacred shrines known as Kaya. Recently, most of the Jibana have adopted foreign religions like Christianity, with conversions to Christianity being dominant.
