= Rabai =

Rabai Mpya
- Location within Kenya
- Coordinates: 3.931733°S 39.571518°E
- Country: Kenya
- County: Kilifi County
- Established: 1846
- Founder: existed as a tribe

Population (2019)
  - Total: 120,813

Rabai, also called Rabai Mpya (New Rabai), is a historic location and Sub-County in Kilifi County, Kenya about 12 miles northwest of the city of Mombasa. It is the first place in Kenya where missionaries of the Church Missionary Society (CMS) established a Christian mission.

== History ==
Johann Ludwig Krapf came to Rabai in 1844 with his pregnant wife Rosine, whom he had married in Egypt. Shortly afterwards on 9 June 1844, his wife died of malaria. At the time of her death, Krapf was also taken ill and their newborn infant died 3 days later. They were buried at Rabai. In 1846 Krapf together with Johannes Rebmann set up a mission at Rabai. Krapf learnt the local languages and translated the Bible into Swahili.

On 10 June 1849 Jakob Erhardt and John Wagner arrived at the Rabai Mpya mission station, where they joined Krapf and Rebmann. However, Wagner died on 1 August 1849. In the spring of 1850 Erhardt and Krapf travelled by dhow down the East African coast from Mombasa. The boat was small and food was scarce, of poor quality and difficult to prepare due to the rain. However, they collected much information about the interior. After the voyage, the two returned to the mission station, and in 1851 Krapf left for Europe to recuperate.

Krapf returned and new missionaries were sent. Several died and the mission was moved inland to Ribe. Krapf went back to Europe and Thomas Wakefield became the lead missionary. Rebecca Wakefield, Charles New and Butterfield were among those lost.

== Today ==
The people of Rabai are known as Rabai (Warabai in Swahili) and their language is also known as Rabai (kirabai in Swahili). They are one of the nine tribes known as Mijikenda.

The Krapf Museum also known as the Rabai Museum was founded in memory of Krapf and his work in the area. The Rabai festival is an annual event held in November to celebrate the history, life and culture of the Rabai and their small town.

== See also ==
- Kaya Mudzi Muvya, a sacred forest of the Rabai
