= Kaloleni, Kenya =

Kaloleni
- Location within Kenya
- Coordinates: 3.817379°S 39.62628°E
- Country: Kenya
- County: Kilifi County

Population (2019)
  - Total: 193,682
- Time zone: UTC+3 (EAT)

Kaloleni is a town in Kilifi County of Kenya. It is located 44 km from the county capital of Kilifi Town and about 50 kilometres (31 mi) by road north of Mombasa city center. Kaloleni serves as an administrative town, tourist town and several secondary schools and colleges are also situated in Kaloleni.

== Food and water supplies ==
Kaloleni is in one of Kenya's poorest and least developed region. Over half of the students at Kaloleni Primary School are orphans, in many cases because their parents died of AIDS. The town lacks safe water supplies. In 2010 World Vision International provided assistance in water purification, which should reduce the incidence of diseases related to water contamination.

In 2009 the district experienced drought, relieved by rains in November. After the rains, the average distance required to reach water fell to 1.2 kilometres (0.75 mi) compared to 5 kilometres (3.1 mi) the previous month. The number of children under five years old at risk of malnutrition rose from 5% in October to 8.30% in November, but this was expect to improve more food and milk became available. In July 2011 the Kaloleni area was again experiencing a severe food shortage. The main diet was maize flour, supplemented by mangoes found growing wild.

== Facilities ==
As of 2010 St. Luke’s MISSION hospital in Kaloleni had been operational for about two years, providing basic care for a population of 400,000 in the region. Malnutrition is a major cause of infant death, often through ignorance of young mothers. The hospital helps educate the mothers. The hospital provides out-patient and inpatient care, with 72 beds and 7 cots. Services include antenatal and obstetric care, antiretroviral therapy, HIV counselling and testing, family planning, immunization and treatment of childhood diseases, and tuberculosis diagnosis and treatment.

Kaloleni Junior academy in Kaloleni is a private primary school, with both day and boarding pupils. Subjects include Mathematics, English, Kiswahili, Science, Christian Religious Education, Geography, History & Civics, Creative Arts, HIV/AIDS, Life Skills and Business Education. St.Johns Girls secondary school is in Kaloleni. In 2009, construction of a new dormitory was completed with the support of the Parents Teachers Association. As of July 2009, a dispensary was under construction. In April 2009 a three-story constituency office was under construction in the town. Private pre unit /primary school - THE BRIDGE INTERNATIONAL SCHOOL - is also found in Kaloleni its a day school in the centre of the town.

== Conservation ==
In March 2011 the U.S. Ambassador to Kenya announced support for a project to help conserve the Kaya Forest in Kaloleni District. UNESCO declared the forest a World Heritage Site in 2010. The USD 10,000 program will build and rehabilitate a water dam, finish reforestation, fence the forest area and set up three entrance and exit gates. The Kaya Elders were to be responsible for the program to conserve rare species of plants and animals.
