= Sabaki languages =

Bantu subfamily of the Swahili Coast, named for the Sabaki River

Sabaki
- Swahili–Nyika
- Geographic distribution: Swahili Coast
- Linguistic classification: Niger–Congo?: Atlantic–Congo; Volta–Congo; Benue–Congo; Bantoid; Southern Bantoid; Bantu; Northeast Bantu; Northeast Coast Bantu; Sabaki
- Proto-language: Proto-Sabaki

Language codes
- Glottolog: coas1317

The Sabaki languages are the Bantu languages of the Swahili Coast, named for the Sabaki River. In addition to Swahili, Sabaki languages include Ilwana (Malakote) and Pokomo on the Tana River in Kenya, Mijikenda, spoken on the Kenyan coast; Comorian, in the Comoro Islands; and Mwani, spoken in northern Mozambique. In Guthrie's geographic classification, Swahili is in Bantu zone G, whereas the other Sabaki languages are in zone E70, commonly under the name Nyika.

== Languages ==
- Ilwana (Malakote) (E.701)
- Pokomo (E.71)
- Mijikenda (E.72–73) (North (Nyika), Segeju, Digo, Degere)
- Comorian languages, divided into two groups, Western (Shimwali and Shingazidja) and Eastern (Shimaore and Shindzwani)
- Mwani (Mozambique)
- Swahili: Makwe (Mozambique), Sidi (Pakistan, India), Tikulu (Bajuni Islands, Somalia), Socotra Swahili, Mwiini (Brava, Somalia), Coastal Swahili (Lamu, Mombasa, Zanzibar), Pemba Swahili (Pemba, Mafia)

In addition, there are several Swahili creoles and pidgins: Cutchi-Swahili, Kisetla (Settler Swahili), Engsh, Sheng, Shaba Swahili (Katanga Swahili, Lubumbashi Swahili), Ngwana (Congo Swahili), Kikeya.
