= Demographics of Somalia =

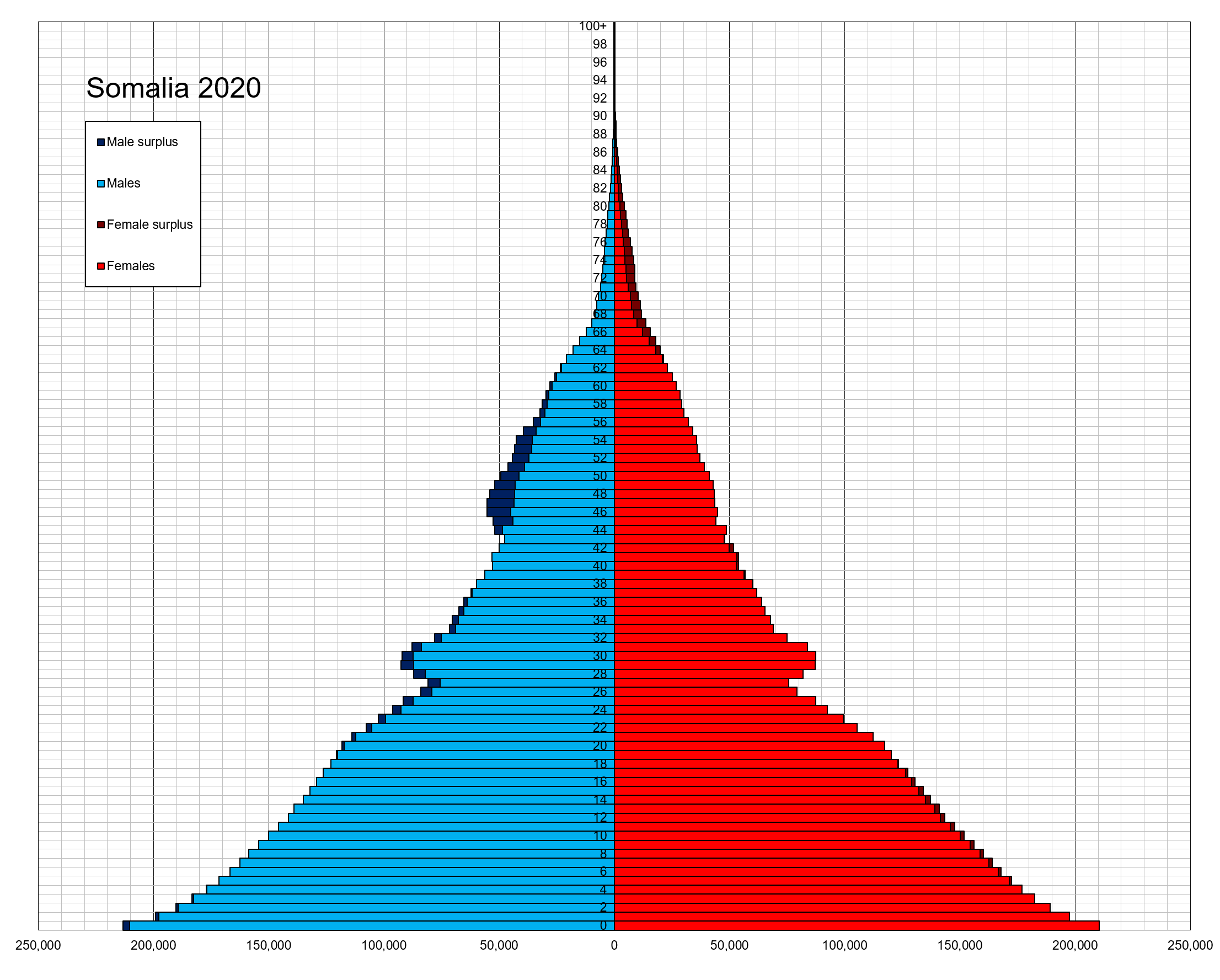
- Population pyramid of Somalia in 2020
- Population: 18,100,000 (2023 est.)
- Growth rate: 2.42% (2022 est.)
- Birth rate: 37.98 births/1,000 population (2022 est.)
- Death rate: 11.62 deaths/1,000 population (2022 est.)
- Life expectancy: 55.72 years
  - male: 53.39 years
  - female: 58.12 years
- Fertility rate: 6.90 children born/woman (2020)
- Infant mortality: 86.53 deaths/1,000 live births
- Net migration rate: -2.18 migrant(s)/1,000 population (2022 est.)
- Immigrant share: 0.4% (2024)

Age structure
- 0–14 years: 42.38%
- 65 and over: 2.27%

Nationality
- Nationality: Somali
- Major ethnic: Somali (98%)

Demographic features of Somalia's inhabitants include ethnicity, language, population density, education level, health, economic status, religious affiliations and other aspects of the population. Somalia is believed to be one of the most homogeneous countries in Africa.

== 2020 survey ==
Child marriages, known to deprive women of opportunities to reach their full potential, have among women aged 20–24, 36 percent of total population.

The April 2020 SHDS report further unveils that fertility rates remain very high, the total fertility rate for Somalia is 6.9 children per woman, the highest in the world, which would impact planning for the next years. In addition, 99 percent of women have still been genitally circumcised.

== Population ==
According to the 2022 revision of the World Population Prospects, the total population was 17,065,581 in 2021, compared to 2,264,000 in 1950. The proportion of children below the age of 15 in 2010 was 44.9%, 52.3% was between 15 and 65 years of age, while 2.7% was 65 years or older.

== Vital statistics ==
Registration of vital events in Somalia is incomplete. The Population Department of the United Nations prepared the following estimates:

Year	Population	Live births per year	Deaths per year	Natural change per year	CBR*	CDR*	NC*	TFR*	IMR*	Life expectancy (years)
1950	2,213,000	112,000	50,000	62,000	50.5	22.4	28.1	7.25	152.1	41.40
1951	2,276,000	114,000	51,000	62,000	49.9	22.6	27.3	7.25	151.4	41.52
1952	2,339,000	116,000	53,000	63,000	49.4	22.5	26.8	7.25	150.1	41.74
1953	2,402,000	117,000	54,000	64,000	48.9	22.4	26.5	7.25	148.8	41.97
1954	2,466,000	119,000	55,000	65,000	48.5	22.3	26.2	7.25	147.6	42.19
1955	2,530,000	122,000	56,000	66,000	48.0	22.1	26.0	7.25	146.3	42.40
1956	2,595,000	124,000	57,000	67,000	47.7	21.9	25.8	7.25	145.1	42.62
1957	2,662,000	126,000	58,000	68,000	47.4	21.7	25.7	7.25	143.9	42.83
1958	2,729,000	129,000	59,000	70,000	47.1	21.5	25.6	7.25	142.7	43.04
1959	2,798,000	131,000	60,000	71,000	46.8	21.3	25.5	7.25	141.6	43.25
1960	2,871,000	134,000	61,000	73,000	46.6	21.1	25.5	7.25	140.4	43.45
1961	2,946,000	137,000	62,000	75,000	46.4	21.0	25.3	7.25	139.8	43.56
1962	3,023,000	140,000	63,000	77,000	46.2	20.7	25.4	7.26	138.1	43.88
1963	3,102,000	143,000	64,000	79,000	46.0	20.5	25.4	7.26	137.0	44.10
1964	3,184,000	146,000	65,000	81,000	45.8	20.4	25.4	7.26	135.9	44.30
1965	3,268,000	149,000	66,000	83,000	45.7	20.2	25.5	7.26	134.6	44.54
1966	3,354,000	153,000	67,000	86,000	45.5	20.0	25.6	7.26	133.5	44.76
1967	3,442,000	156,000	68,000	88,000	45.4	19.8	25.6	7.25	132.4	44.97
1968	3,532,000	160,000	69,000	91,000	45.3	19.6	25.7	7.23	131.4	45.17
1969	3,625,000	164,000	71,000	93,000	45.2	19.5	25.8	7.21	130.4	45.37
1970	3,721,000	168,000	72,000	96,000	45.2	19.3	25.9	7.18	129.4	45.56
1971	3,818,000	173,000	73,000	99,000	45.2	19.2	26.0	7.15	128.4	45.75
1972	3,918,000	177,000	75,000	103,000	45.2	19.0	26.2	7.12	127.5	45.94
1973	4,022,000	182,000	76,000	106,000	45.2	18.9	26.3	7.09	126.5	46.13
1974	4,126,000	187,000	86,000	101,000	45.3	20.7	24.6	7.06	137.8	43.82
1975	4,228,000	192,000	86,000	106,000	45.5	20.4	25.1	7.03	135.9	44.18
1976	4,334,000	198,000	87,000	111,000	45.7	20.1	25.5	7.02	134.0	44.57
1977	4,450,000	204,000	82,000	122,000	45.8	18.3	27.5	7.00	122.6	46.92
1978	4,778,000	214,000	84,000	130,000	46.8	18.4	28.4	7.13	121.7	46.95
1979	5,409,000	241,000	93,000	148,000	47.1	18.2	28.8	7.16	120.7	47.31
1980	5,892,000	277,000	106,000	171,000	47.3	18.1	29.2	7.18	119.8	47.49
1981	5,935,000	291,000	110,000	181,000	47.7	18.1	29.7	7.23	119.0	47.67
1982	5,952,000	286,000	107,000	179,000	48.0	18.0	30.0	7.25	118.2	47.83
1983	6,143,000	296,000	109,000	187,000	48.3	17.8	30.5	7.28	116.6	48.17
1984	6,369,000	307,000	112,000	196,000	48.5	17.6	30.9	7.30	115.2	48.46
1985	6,631,000	322,000	117,000	205,000	48.7	17.7	31.0	7.33	114.8	48.28
1986	6,909,000	336,000	121,000	215,000	48.9	17.6	31.2	7.35	114.1	48.37
1987	7,158,000	351,000	124,000	227,000	49.0	17.3	31.7	7.37	113.1	48.90
1988	7,160,000	362,000	151,000	211,000	49.1	20.5	28.6	7.40	115.8	43.84
1989	7,035,000	352,000	131,000	221,000	49.2	18.3	30.8	7.42	110.1	46.72
1990	6,999,000	349,000	128,000	221,000	49.0	18.0	31.0	7.44	108.3	47.11
1991	6,733,000	346,000	284,000	63,000	49.4	40.5	8.9	7.47	237.4	26.57
1992	6,428,000	327,000	251,000	76,000	50.2	38.6	11.7	7.50	236.3	27.31
1993	6,621,000	328,000	101,000	227,000	50.4	15.5	34.9	7.53	104.6	50.65
1994	6,960,000	351,000	111,000	240,000	50.3	15.9	34.4	7.54	105.1	50.33
1995	7,211,000	360,000	113,000	247,000	50.1	15.8	34.4	7.58	104.5	50.60
1996	7,472,000	376,000	119,000	257,000	50.1	15.9	34.2	7.62	104.8	50.45
1997	7,734,000	388,000	124,000	264,000	50.3	16.1	34.2	7.66	106.8	50.20
1998	8,057,000	403,000	127,000	276,000	50.2	15.8	34.4	7.65	104.6	50.66
1999	8,384,000	419,000	133,000	286,000	50.1	15.9	34.2	7.63	104.7	50.53
2000	8,721,000	434,000	137,000	297,000	49.9	15.8	34.1	7.61	104.6	50.66
2001	9,071,000	450,000	142,000	308,000	49.7	15.7	34.0	7.58	104.4	50.74
2002	9,411,000	467,000	148,000	320,000	49.7	15.7	34.0	7.58	104.4	50.73
2003	9,758,000	482,000	153,000	329,000	49.4	15.7	33.7	7.55	104.5	50.61
2004	10,117,000	498,000	159,000	339,000	49.2	15.7	33.5	7.52	104.6	50.54
2005	10,467,000	513,000	163,000	350,000	49.0	15.6	33.4	7.48	104.4	50.66
2006	10,785,000	527,000	168,000	359,000	48.7	15.6	33.2	7.46	104.1	50.60
2007	11,118,000	539,000	173,000	366,000	48.5	15.5	32.9	7.42	103.5	50.52
2008	11,445,000	555,000	174,000	381,000	48.2	15.1	33.1	7.39	101.3	51.12
2009	11,730,000	565,000	172,000	393,000	47.9	14.6	33.4	7.34	98.7	51.85
2010	12,027,000	576,000	185,000	390,000	47.7	15.4	32.3	7.30	102.5	50.56
2011	12,217,000	589,000	184,000	405,000	47.5	14.9	32.7	7.26	100.0	51.30
2012	12,440,000	590,000	169,000	420,000	47.3	13.6	33.7	7.20	91.4	53.16
2013	12,852,000	604,000	169,000	435,000	47.0	13.1	33.9	7.13	88.7	53.84
2014	13,309,000	622,000	170,000	452,000	46.7	12.8	33.9	7.06	86.1	54.28
2015	13,764,000	640,000	171,000	469,000	46.5	12.4	34.0	6.98	83.9	54.86
2016	14,293,000	657,000	175,000	482,000	46.2	12.3	33.9	6.89	82.0	55.04
2017	14,864,000	675,000	177,000	498,000	45.5	11.9	33.6	6.74	79.8	55.65
2018	15,411,000	693,000	176,000	516,000	45.0	11.4	33.5	6.63	77.2	56.38
2019	15,981,000	711,000	176,000	535,000	44.6	11.0	33.5	6.53	75.0	57.08
2020	16,537,000	728,000	188,000	540,000	44.0	11.4	32.6	6.42	72.9	55.97
2021	17,271,000	762,000	195,000	566,000	44.1	11.3	32.8	6.35	70.0	57.2
2022	17,802,000	780,000	228,000	551,000	43.8	12.8	31.0	6.26	86.7	53.9
2023	18,356,000	789,000	181,000	608,000	43.0	9.8	33.1	6.13	66.3	58.8
* CBR = crude birth rate (per 1000); CDR = crude death rate (per 1000); NC = natural change (per 1000); IMR = infant mortality rate per 1000 births; TFR = total fertility rate (number of children per woman)

== Ethnic groups ==
=== Somalis ===
Somalis constitute the largest ethnic group in Somalia, at approximately 85% of its inhabitants. They are organized into clan groupings, which are important social units; clan membership plays a central part in Somali culture and politics. Clans are patrilineal and are typically divided into sub-clans, sometimes with many sub-divisions. Through the xeer system (customary law), the advanced clan structure has served governmental roles in many rural Somali communities.

According to The Economist, at independence Somalia was "arguably in ethnic terms the most homogeneous country in Africa" however, the publication also notes:

"..its ethnic homogeneity is misleading. Despite also sharing a single language and religion, it is divided into more than 500 clans and sub-clans."

==== Somali Clans ====
Somali clans (Somali: Qabaa'ilka Soomaalida; Arabic: القبائل الصومالية, romanized: al-Qabā'il al-Sūmāliyya) are patrilineal kinship groups based on agnatic descent of the Somali people. Tradition and folklore connects the origin of the Somali population by language and way of life, and societal organisations, by customs, and by a feeling of belonging to a broader family among individuals from the Arabian Peninsula.

The Somali people are mainly divided among five patrilineal clans, the Hawiye, Darod, Rahanweyn, Dir, and Isaaq. The average person is able to trace their ancestry generations back. Somali clans in contemporary times have an established official structure in the country's political system, acknowledged by a mathematical formula for equitably distributing seats between the clans in the Federal Parliament of Somalia.

The clan represents the highest degree of familial affiliation. It holds territorial properties and is typically overseen by a Sultan. Clans possess ancestral lands, which are associated with the migratory patterns of the Somali populace throughout their historical narrative. Each clan is administered by its designated leader and supported by its council of elders, with land being communally owned and overseen. Various Somali clans utilise distinct titles for their leaders, including Sultan, Emir, Imam, Ughaz, and Garad. Clan leadership may be hereditary, or leaders may be elected by the council of elders composed of representatives from diverse clan lineages. The leaders of these clans fulfill both religious and political responsibilities.

=== Other ethnic groups ===
Non-Somali ethnic minority groups make up about 15% of Somalia's population. They include Arabs, Bantus and Bajunis.

== Languages ==
Speech sample in Standard Somali.

Somali is the official language of Somalia. It is the mother tongue of Somalis, the nation's most populous ethnic group. The language is a member of the Cushitic branch of the Afroasiatic family.

In addition to Somali, Arabic, which is also an Afroasiatic tongue, is another official language in Somalia. Many speak it due to centuries-old ties with the Arab world, the far-reaching influence of the Arabic media, and religious education.

English is widely used and taught. Other minority languages include Bravanese, a variant of the Bantu Swahili language that is spoken along the southern coast by the Bravanese people, as well as Bajuni, another Swahili dialect that is the mother tongue of the Bajuni ethnic minority group

== See also ==
- Somalia
- Demographics of Djibouti
- Demographics of Eritrea
- Demographics of Ethiopia
