= Nabhani =

Nabhani may refer to:

- Nabhani dynasty, rulers of Oman between the 12th and 17th century
- Fatma Al-Nabhani, Omani tennis player
- Mohammed Al-Nabhani, Omani former tennis player
- Taqiuddin al-Nabhani, Palestinian Muslim scholar and philosopher
- Yusuf an-Nabhani, Palestinian Muslim scholar and philosopher

== Others ==
- Ahmed Sheikh Nabhany, (27 November 1927 – February 2017), Kenyan academic and poet

== See also ==
- Nabhan, a name
