= Kaluta Amri Abeid =

Tanzanian Muslim cleric (1924–1964)

- Born: 1924; Kigoma-Ujiji District, Tanzania
- Died: November 9, 1964 (aged 39–40); Bonn, Germany
- Occupations: Minister of Justice and of Development and Culture, mayor of Dar es Salaam, poet and translator
- Notable work: Sheria za Kutunga Mashairi na Diwani ya Amri [The Rules of Poetic Composition and Amri’s Poems] (in Swahili, 1954)

Kaluta Amri Abeid (Kaluta Amri Abedi, Sheikh Amri Abeid Kaluta, Sheikh Kaluta, 1924–9 Oct 1964) was a Tanzanian Muslim cleric (Sheikh), civil servant, politician and poet.

== Biography ==
Kaluta Amri Abeid was the second Minister of Justice of Tanganyika and Minister of Development and Culture under President Julius Nyerere in 1963-1964, and the first African mayor of Dar es Salaam. He also was a seminal Swahili poet and translator. Abeid was a prominent member of the Tanganyika African National Union (TANU) and led the national delegation to the General Assembly of the United Nations in New York.

Abeid was on the presidential commission to advise over turning Tanzania into a one-party state. However, he died in 1964 before the commission delivered its final report.

Like his fellow Tanzanian poet Saadan Kandoro, Kaluta Amri Abedi was an adherent of nationalist politics.

== Honours ==
The Sheikh Amri Abeid Memorial Stadium in Arusha was named after him.

== Swahili poetry quotation ==
A poetry fragment by Sheikh Kaluta using an extended utenzi form is:

Uadui ukizi
Humpofusha maizi;
Ukamfanya hasidi
Mzushi na mchongezi;
Ukamfikisha hadi
Ya ujinga na uozi;
Mtu huadui mwezi
Akausema ni nyota.

— Abedi, K.A.
Translation:

Enmity
Blinds the mind;
It makes it envious
A heretic and a slanderer;
It leads it to
Ignorance and slander;
A person hates the moon
And calls it a star.

== Publications ==
His publications include:

- Abeid, Kaluta Amri (1954). Sheria za Kutunga Mashairi na Diwani ya Amri [The Rules of Poetic Composition and Amri’s Poems] (in Swahili). East African Literature Bureau. OCLC 557822348. Essay and poems. 148 pages.
- Nyerere, Julius K.; Abeid, Kaluta Amri (1970). Kilio cha Uhuru [The Cry of Freedom] (in Swahili). Dar es Salaam: National Print. OCLC 602596153. Speech, 21 pages.
- Mnyampala, Mathias E.; Abeid, Kaluta Amri (1965). Waadhi wa ushairi [Poetry lovers] (in Swahili). Dar es Salaam: East African Literature Bureau. OCLC 1014978246. 87 pages.
- Abeid, KA, et al., eds. (1964). African Conference on Local Courts and Customary Law Held in Dar es Salaam, Tanganyika, 8th September 1963-18th September 1963, Under the Chairmanship of the Minister of Justice of Tanganyika, Sheik Amri Abedi. Dar es Salaam: University College and Ford Foundation. OCLC 3671394. 143 pages.
