= Sidi language =

Bantu language of Pakistan and India

Sidi
- Native to: Pakistan, India
- Region: Sindh, Gujarat
- Ethnicity: Siddi
- Native speakers: endangered (2016)
- Language family: Niger–Congo?: Atlantic–Congo; Benue–Congo; Bantoid; Bantu; Northeast Coast; Sabaki; Swahili; Sidi

Language codes
- ISO 639-3: None (mis)
- Glottolog: None
- Guthrie code: G.404

Sidi is a Bantu language of Pakistan and India, related to Swahili. Most of the Sidi community today speaks a regional Indic language, mostly Gujarati, mixed with some Bantu words and phrases, and the current number of speakers is unknown. It was reportedly still spoken in the 1960s in Jambur, a village in Kathiawar, Gujarat, by the Siddi. A survey of regional languages conducted by the government of Gujarat in 2016 reported that the language is in danger of extinction.
