= Nabhan =

Nabhan is a surname. Notable people with the surname include:

- Nabhan Garcia (born 1958), Brazilian politician and farmer, secretary of the Bolsonaro government
- Gary Paul Nabhan (born 1952), American agricultural ecologist, ethnobotanist, Ecumenical Franciscan Brother and author
- Khaled Nabhan (1969–2024), Palestinian social media personality, killed by Israeli airstrike
- Saleh Ali Saleh Nabhan (1979–2009), Kenyan born leader of al-Qaeda in Somalia
- Walid Nabhan (born 1966), Maltese writer and translator of Palestinian-Jordanian origin
- Lara Nabhan (born 1989), Lebanese journalist
- Omar Nabhan (died 2013), Kenyan mass murderer and terrorist, one of four perpetrators of the Westgate shopping mall attack

== See also ==
- Sawadiya - Nabhan, a Syrian village
