= Standard Swahili language =

Supradialectal Swahili variety

Standard Swahili language arose during the colonial era as the homogenised version of the dominant dialects of the Swahili language.

Standard Swahili enabled communication in a wide array of situations: it facilitated political cooperation between anti-apartheid fighters from South Africa and their Tanzanian military instructors and continues to give members of the African American community a sense of connection to their homeland.

The first stage of Swahili standardisation was carried out by the Universities' Mission to Central Africa, which was later continued by the specialised organisations such as The Inter-Territorial Language Committee and the East African Literature Bureau.

== Attitudes ==
In 1960-1990s, the Swahili literature had two philosophical schools: a traditionalist one, whose proponents were inspired by the old poetic forms, and a progressive one, that sought the creation of new free verse poetry. The traditionalists strongly preferred writing in dialects while the progressivists advocated for the Standard Swahili. Although both sides unquestionably saw it as a colonial creation, the progressivists such as Wilfred Whiteley, Ireri Mbaabu, Shihabuddin Chiraghdin, Mathias Mnyampala, Rocha Chimerah and David Massamba championed Standard Swahili as a tool of intercultural communication and nation-building. Their opponents such as Abdallah Khalid, John Mugane, Alamin Mazrui and Ibrahim Noor Shariff criticised it as an artificial imposition with a questionable history.

== History ==
=== Early history ===
Proto-Swahili arose as one of the northeast coastal dialects of the Bantu family sometime between 100 and 500 CE. By 800 CE, Swahili has consolidated its two main dialectal groups, and by the 18th century, Swahili became the lingua franca of the Eastern Africa. Standardisation started in the 19 century under the European colonial rule.

The first Europeans and Americans to trade with Swahili speakers made many wordlists to help themselves with communication, but the systematic study of the language began in the 19 century. An important figure for the standardisation was Johann Ludwig Krapf, a German missionary who first started writing Swahili using a Latin-based alphabet; he picked the Kimvita dialect of Mombasa as the base for writing a grammar and a dictionary of Swahili. Krapf also translated a part of the Book of Genesis into Swahili. Krapf saw the standardisation as a crucial goal but did not expect it to happen in the 19 century.

=== UMCA ===
Zanzibar was the "capital" of East Africa and the western coast of the Indian Ocean. The Universities' Mission to Central Africa that started in 1864, picked the Kiunguja dialect as a base for their own writings: it was the dialect of the Zanzibar traders who sponsored the majority of the caravans They did not consciously standardise Swahili, but ended up using a relatively homogenised variety by 1844. Swahili was at that point an ethnic language, but its status of the lingua franca of the caravan trade was the reason for it to become the main language of the mission in addition to the fact that it was related to many languages of the region. Some missionaries rejected the idea of using Swahili or specifically the Kiunguja dialect in their proselytism because most speakers were Muslim, but the UMCA embraced it as a possible tool of conversion of Muslims.

The UMCA published numerous handbooks for teaching the language with the help of the educated locals and former slaves whom the mission housed despite their inability to convert these Muslims to Christianity. Edward Steere and Richard Lewin Pennell exchanged letters about their Swahili translations in 1868–1872, holding long discussions about their word choices; their correspondence reveals the extent to which the UMCA relied on Swahili first-language speakers such as teachers and students of their schools. The most prominent of the interlocutors was Abd al Aziz al-Amawi, a Muslim scholar, qadi and faqih who helped the UMCA with the translations (especially the Gospel of Luke) and debated them about theology. Others were Zanzibari men named Kassim, Ali, Hamisi wa Kai, Masasa and Muhammed bin Khamis who conducted field research for the missionaries by asking locals whether they understood particular words and phrases. The missionaries tested their translations by reading them out to students and asking them to read their writings aloud: at that point, there was no established convention for writing Swahili using the Latin alphabet, and the observations helped finding the most convenient spelling practice. From time to time, they had to invent or adapt words that denoted unfamiliar entities such as "church" or "priest". The Swahili translation of the New Testament published 1883 was a milestone in the standardisation process since it incorporated all of the findings of the initial codification phase.

Some attention was paid by other local languages (Bondei, Shambala, Somali, Masaai, Malagasy and others), but UMCA believed that using a single language would allow their missionaries to convert locals more effectively, so Swahili became the de facto standard for the mission's community. All UMCA schools used Swahili as the medium of instruction; the mission also published a bimonthly magazine in Swahili, "Msimulizi", which allowed people from the opposite corners of the UMCA community to communicate in a standard Swahili variety. Students and teachers all across the mission collected local news and wrote articles that they sent to the editor; the printing facility was located in Zanzibar. The language choices of the magazine's editors intended to convey a sense of familial bonding within the mission: the readers were called ndugu ("sibling, comrade"), while the words jamaa ("family, society") and kundi ("crowd, flock") were referring to all Christians or one mission's population.

=== German and British colonisation ===
The English-Swahili (1894) and Swahili-English (1903) dictionaries published by Arthur Cornwallis Madan became major sources for Swahili standardisation. No official policy declared Swahili the most important language, yet, as more and more territories inhabited by Swahili speakers became colonised by Germany, the status of the language grew due to the help it received from the German administration desiring to unify its African domain under a single language of governance. Many prominent Swahili scholars of the turn of the century were Germans: Carl Büttner, Carl Meinhof, Carl Velten, and Diedrich Westermann. Also, German administration cemented the usage of Latin alphabet to write Swahili by making it the standard at schools.

In 1893, UMCA created a Translation Committee—a panel of experts whose job was to oversee the revision and reprinting of the old publications as well as the creation of the new ones. The Translation Committee changed some of the word usage and substituted, for example, Isa Masiya with Yesu Kristo as the Swahili rendering of the name of Jesus Christ to break away from the common association of Isa with the Islamic Jesus. In this period, the mission moved away from the practice of testing the new texts in the classroom.

German East Africa was given to Great Britain after the First World War, adding to their colonies in the region; the colonial administration saw the unifying potential of Swahili and held several meetings to determine a single linguistic standard for teaching and governance starting in 1925 in Dar es Salam. The conferences adopted the Kiunguja dialect as the standard form and established The Inter-Territorial Language Committee (ILC) for its standardisation in 1930. The committee had no African members until 1939, and no voting African members until the colonies were given independence. It published a Swahili–English and an English–Swahili dictionaries in 1939; both were compiled with the mission to "improve" and "civilise" spoken Swahili; the ILC saw their printing as a sign of the "completion" of the standardisation process. The work of the Commission drew criticism ranging from disagreements with the Latin basis of the orthography to animosity to the idea that Europeans should be involved in language planning in Africa.

The East African Literature Bureau was established in 1948 to promote the creation and distributing literature in English and local languages, mainly Swahili; the first director of the bureau was Charles Granston Richards who occupied this position in 1948–1963. The EALB published books in Swahili, English, Luganda, Luo, Kikuyu and other languages, but Swahili dominated in its output with 41% of the printed books being written in this language. They also printed guides for better writing such as "Hints to Translators" and "Some Forms of Writing", which described several genres of fiction that were common in European literature such as non-fiction and autobiography. Tanzanian author Shaaban bin Robert, who was nicknamed the Father of Swahili, extensively collaborated with EALB and published in Standard Swahili based on Kiunguja dialect but with other dialectal features incorporated. EALB also censored its publications, deleting references to racism and other "controversial" subjects, which often turned their output into government propaganda.

Governments of African countries and territories had different linguistic priorities: Uganda was mainly interested in Luganda and did not pay much attention to Swahili; Zanzibar encouraged printing in Arabic and very formal Swahili while Tanganyika expressed strong support to organisations that promote Swahili. Tanganyika's anticolonial politicians established the Tanganyika African National Union and chose Standard Swahili as the tool of resistance; Kenya African National Union also used Swahili to mobilise the population against the colonial administration. After TANU's head Julius Nyerere became the first president of Tanzania, he promoted the Elimu ya Kujitegemea initiative which established universal basic education and advanced literacy—both in Swahili. The use of Swahili Ajami (Arabic alphabet) continued in Tanganyika until 1940s while the coastal population employed it far longer, with important authors like Alamin Mazrui and Muhamadi Kijuma strongly promoting it

Contemporary East African countries also hold conflicting opinions on Standard Swahili: some see it as a colonial construct that foreign governments forced upon them, others prefer English as a medium for schooling (even in Tanzania where Swahili is the language of the Parliament, English dominated in secondary and tertiary education), yet many name it the national or official language. The variability of Swahili that is actually used in these countries remains high despite the standardisation. The ILC was restructured into the Institute of Kiswahili Research in 1964 and produced the Standard Swahili Dictionary in 1981. Kenyan government created a similar organisation, CHAKITA, whose members participated in the translation of the Kenyan constitution into Swahili.
