= Settler Swahili =

Swahili pidgin from Kenya and Zambia

- Settla
- Kisetla
- Region: Zambia, Kenya
- Native speakers: None
- Language family: Swahili pidgin

Language codes
- ISO 639-3: sta
- Glottolog: sett1235
- Guthrie code: G40C
- ELP: Settla

Settla (Kisetla), or Settler Swahili, is a Swahili pidgin mainly spoken in large European settlements in Kenya and Zambia. It was used mainly by native English speaking European colonists for communication with the native Swahili speakers.

== Origins ==
British colonization in the region—largely in what is now Kenya and Zambia—created a complex relationship between English and the native languages of the countries where Settla is spoken.

== Phonology ==
=== Vowels ===
Settla appears to have a similar vowel system as compared to standard Swahili.

=== Consonants ===
Settla contains a different and more reduced set of consonants than standard Swahili.

		Labial	Dental	Alveolar	Postalveolar / palatal	Velar	Glottal
Nasal		m /m/		n /n/	ny /ɲ/	ng /ŋ/	
Stop	Plosive	b /b/		d /d/	j /d̠ʒ/	g /g/	
Stop	Tenuis	p /p/		t /t/	ch /tʃ/	k /k/	
Stop	Aspirated	(p /pʰ/)		(t /tʰ/)	(ch /tʃʰ/)	(k /kʰ/)	
Fricative	Voiced	v /v/	dh /ð/	z /z/			
Fricative	Voiceless	f /f/	th /θ/	s /s/	sh /ʃ/		h /h/
Flap				r /ɾ/			
Approximant				l /l/	y /j/	w /w/	

Notes:

- Voiceless stops p, t, and k are often more aspirated in Settla when compared to standard Swahili. This is particularly true when these stops are in word-initial position or require more articulation.
- For some /k/ in standard Swahili, Settla uses /g/. For example: piga 'hit' pika 'cook' in standard and piga 'hit', 'cook' in Settla.
- Settla lacks the implosive variants b /ɓ/, d /ɗ/, j /ʄ/, and g /ɠ/.
- /f/ and /v/ in Settla show a different allophonic distribution than in standard Swahili. For example, in standard Swahili ndovu 'elephant', nguvu 'strength', and mbovu 'rotten' contain /v/, whereas in Settla, both words for 'elephant' and 'strength' can freely use either [f] or [v]: ndovu/ndofu, nguvu/ngufu. However 'rotten' mbovu always contains [v] in Settla.
- Some dialects of Swahili feature dh /ð/, th /θ/, gh /ɣ/, and kh /x/, however these do not occur in Settla. th /θ/, dh /ð/ are usually merged into s and z respectively, while gh /ɣ/ is always merged into g. kh /x/ will always merge into either k or h, with there seeming to be a preference towards the corresponding English form. Since gh /ɣ/ and kh /x/ are changed, typical Arabic loanwords that feature those segments are practically never used in Settla.
- The nasal velar /ŋ/ does not occur by itself in Settla as it does in standard Swahili. /ŋ/ alternates between a stop [g], and a nasal [ŋ] plus stop [g].

== Morphology ==
A thorough investigation into the morphology of Settla has not occurred, but there are some general patterns that hold true.

=== Noun classes ===
Settla features a noun class system that differs from standard Swahili, which like most Bantu languages contains a rich noun class system. Since most Settla speakers are native speakers of English, which lacks a complex noun class system, Settla appears to also have a less complex noun class system than standard Swahili. Although there needs to be more research on the specifics, it can be concluded that the speakers of Settla do not disregard this system, but their patterns do most certainly differ from standard Swahili.

In Settla:

- n- nouns are identical.
- m-/mi- and ji-/ma- classes only occur in the plural form.
- ki-/vi- and m-/wa- classes tend to occur in singular form.
- nouns that feature an initial nasal followed by a stop undergo epenthesis of a vowel.

=== Concordial agreement ===
Numeral adjectives and certain adverbial forms do not always show concordial agreement like in standard Swahili.

=== Affixes ===
Swahili is an agglutinative language, which gives rise to a complex structure for verbs in the form of affixes. Unlike standard Swahili, Settla verbs do not feature any negative, subject marking, relative pronoun marking, or object marking affixes. However, Settla can still convey these aspects by using other words and not verb-bound affixes.

For example, if one looks at personal pronoun subject marking in standard Swahili, one would find that these subject affixes are required for the verb. In Settla, in a form that perhaps mimics English, these affixes are absent and replaced by outside personal pronoun nouns, which only rarely occurs in standard Swahili. The personal pronouns of Settla are as follow:

	Singular				Plural		
Language	First Person	Second Person	Third Person		First Person	Second Person	Third Person
English	I	you	he, she	it, that	we	you (y'all)	they
Settla	mimi ~ mi	wewe ~ we	yeye ~ ye	ile	sisi	(ninyi)	(wao)

We can see in the examples below that in standard Swahili, the definite time marker attaches closer to the verb stem as opposed to the subject prefix, and that the 3pl marking affix is also present in the verb. In Settla, the 3pl affix is removed, forcing the definite time affix to attach to the verb directly, and the pronoun used is yeye (he / she), since wao (they) appears to be fairly absent in Settla:

Standard Swahili	Settla
wao wa- -na- kaa they 3PL DEF.TIME sit 'They are sitting'	yeye na- kaa {they (he/she)} DEF.TIME sit 'They are sitting'

As opposed to direct objects, indirect objects in standard Swahili are given precedence to be marked. This indirect object must also carry a dative case suffix. In Settla, the dative suffix is omitted, and the syntactic structure mimics English again, like in the example above.

Affixes marking an object that are featured in standard Swahili are also replaced by separate words in Settla.

Standard Swahili features many ways of negating verbs (including marking a verb with an affix), whereas Settla uses the word hapana (commonly meaning 'no' in standard Swahili) in a more free manner (generally mimicking English syntax) to negate the verb that follows. Note that in the last declarative example, the syntactic structure changes in Settla, mimicking English.

Standard Swahili	Settla
si -ta- anguka NEG/I FUT fall 'I will not fall'	mimi hapana anguka I NEG fall 'I will not fall'
ha '-ja- oa NEG/he PERF marry 'He hasn't gotten married'	yeye hapana oa he NEG marry 'He hasn't gotten married'
m '-si- -ni- -pig- -en- i you.PL NEG me hit PL IMP 'Don't (you) hit me!'	hapana piga mimi NEG hit I 'Don't (you) hit me!'

As noted above, Settla generally lacks verb constructions that in standard Swahili require a complement affix. However the one large exception occurs where standard Swahili would use a subjunctive, the Settla form of the verb would take on the infinitive prefix ku- (to in English). One brief exception to this exception though, is that the preposition kwa is sometimes used to indicate purpose, and therefore appears to form a restriction between kwa and ku- co-occurring.

Many other affixes within a standard Swahili verb are replaced within Settla.

iko, a locative verb in standard Swahili is expanded in Settla to uses outside of the standard Swahili usage which indicate place in n-class or indefinite-class nouns. It is used more generally as a locative, ignoring other more specific affixes that would occur in standard. Iko may also be used in Settla as a copula alternating with ni or NULL.

Standard Swahili	Settla
{ku-na / wa-ko} watu wengi hapa there-are people many here 'There are many people here.'	Iko mutu mingi hapa LOC people many here 'There are many people here.'
(yeye) ni mgonjwa he is ill 'He is ill.'	yeye iko mgonjwa he LOC ill 'He is ill.' yeye ni mgonjwa he is ill 'He is ill.' yeye mgonjwa he ill 'He is ill.'

Tense in Settla is heavily reduced to only 3 forms (Standard has 11). na-, the standard present tense affix often can mean future tense as well. The tense of a phrase is generally determined contextually.

Standard Swahili	Settla
ni -ta- kuja kesho I FUT come tomorrow 'I will come tomorrow.'	mimi ta- kuja kesho I FUT come tomorrow 'I will come tomorrow.' mimi na- kuja kesho I PRES come tomorrow 'I will come tomorrow.'

== Lexicon ==
Settla's lexicon is considered to be on a continuum between the two official languages of Kenya: standard Swahili and English. The lexicon is also heavily influenced by geographical, social, and emotional factors. Although geography factors into the lexicon, it is unknown if Settla has different geographical dialects.

It is not uncommon for parts of Settla speech to be in a bantuized version of English, and in fact sometimes whole sentences can come out in English. Due to the rise of English education in Kenya, it is possible for communication to feature more and more English words and phrases.
