= Socotra Swahili language =

Extinct Swahili variety formerly spoken on Socotra, Yemen

Socotra Swahili
- Native to: Yemen
- Region: Socotra
- Ethnicity: Soqotrans
- Extinct: late 20th century
- Language family: Niger–Congo?: Atlantic–Congo; Benue–Congo; Bantoid; Bantu; Northeast Coast; Sabaki; Swahili; Socotra Swahili

Language codes
- ISO 639-3: None (mis)
- Glottolog: None
- Guthrie code: G.411
- IETF: sw-u-sd-yesu

Socotra Swahili is an extinct variety of Swahili, a Bantu language, that was formerly spoken on the island of Socotra in Yemen. It was reported to be spoken by a fifth of the island (c. 2,000 people) in 1962.

== Classification ==
Socotra Swahili belongs to the Sabaki branch of Northeast Coast Bantu, within the broader Swahili dialect cluster.

The Swahili group as a whole is treated as a single language with ISO 639-3 code swh and glottocode swah1253, covering both mainland and insular varieties.

== Status and coding ==
A mid-20th-century account estimated that Socotra Swahili was spoken by about 2,000 people, around one fifth of Socotra's population at the time.

Socotra Swahili does not have a separate ISO 639-3 or Glottolog code; instead it falls under the general Swahili entry (ISO 639-3 swh). In the ISO 639-2 and ISO 639-1 standards, the macrolanguage Swahili is assigned the alpha-3 code swa and alpha-2 code sw, respectively, without distinguishing Socotra Swahili. In Guthrie-based Bantu classifications, however, Socotra Swahili is explicitly identified as G.411, marking it as a distinct Swahili lect associated specifically with Socotra.
