= Ilwana language =

Bantu language spoken in Kenya

Ilwana
- Malakote
- Kiwilwana
- Native to: Kenya
- Region: Tana River District
- Native speakers: 22,000 (2019 census)
- Language family: Niger–Congo?: Atlantic–Congo; Volta-Congo; Benue–Congo; Bantoid; Southern Bantoid; Bantu; Northeast Coast Bantu; Sabaki; Ilwana

Language codes
- ISO 639-3: mlk
- Glottolog: ilwa1237
- Guthrie code: E.701
- ELP: Kiwilwana

Ilwana (Kiwilwana), or Malakote, is a minor Bantu language of Kenya.
