= Ahmed Sheikh Nabhany =

Kenyan poet and scholar (1927–2017)

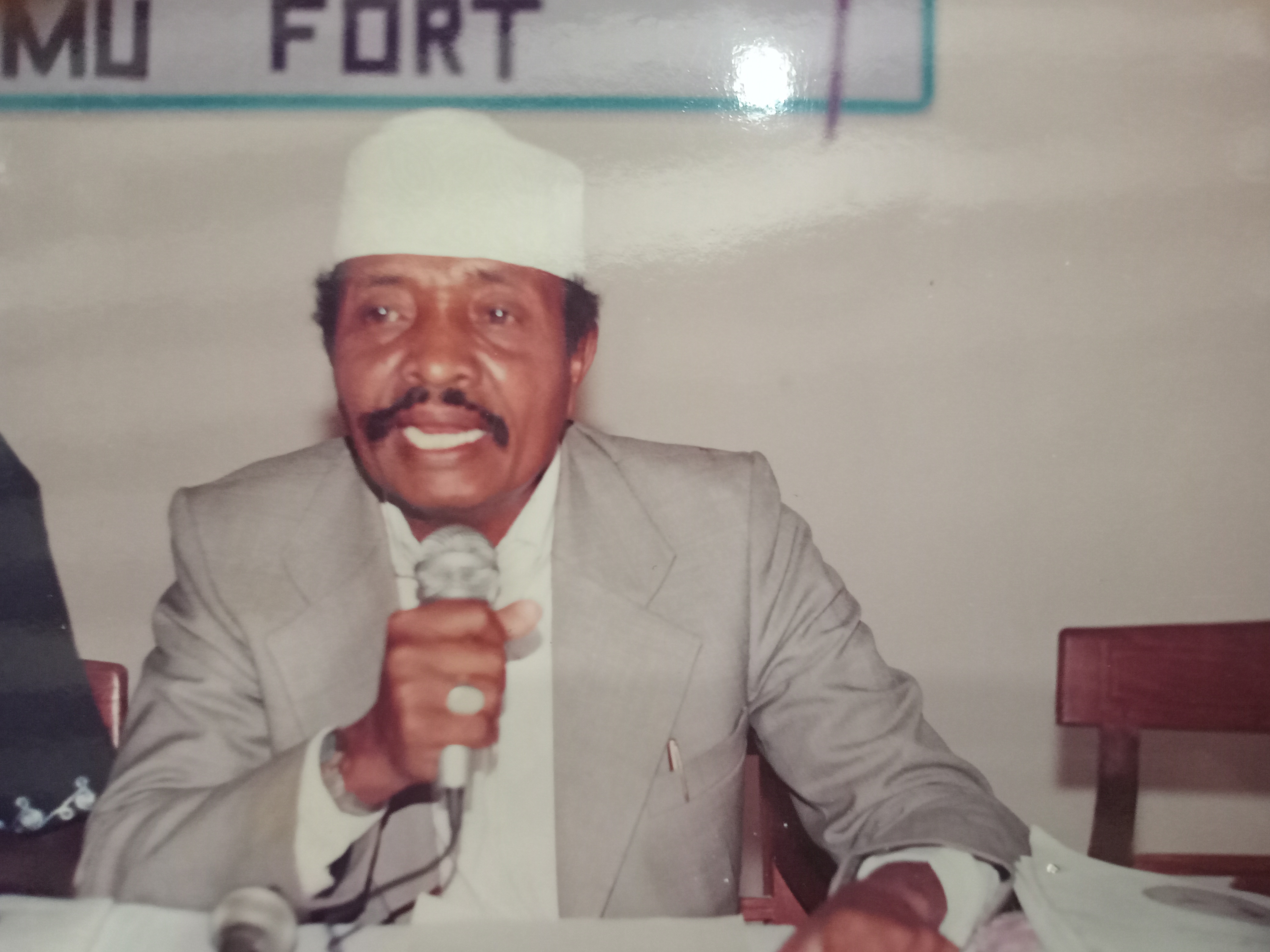
- Born: 27 November 1927; Matondoni, Kenya
- Died: 23 February 2017 (aged 89); Matondoni, Kenya
- Occupations: Academic scholar, professor, poet, writer

Ahmed Sheikh Nabhany (27 November 1927 – 23 February 2017) was a Kenyan academic scholar, poet, lexicologist, historian and professor often regarded as the father of modern Swahili poetry. He was the recipient of The Order of the Grand Warrior (O.G.W).

== Early life and education ==
Nabhany was born on 27 November 1927, in Matondoni, Lamu County, Kenya. He was raised by the grandmother, Amina Abubakar Sheikh because his parents died at his tender age. Nabhany started writing and self composing poems at 12, taught by his grandmother who was also a poet. He attended a local Islamic school at Riyadha Mosque in Lamu where he studied Islam.

Nabhany was a self taught scholar whose contributions had focused on Swahili culture. While in Mombasa, he also attended evening classes in English as well as learnt Arabic language.

== Career ==
After Nabhany had moved into Mombasa where he worked as a government official, and as a civil servant, he taught many Kiswahili students from several Europe. He also aided the foundation of the National Museums of Kenya and operated the Research institute of Swahili studies of Eastern Africa. He wrote and published many works of poetry while in the United States and Germany. His poems and anthologies published in the early 1970s in local journals was recognised for impacting the Swahili language and culture at the Kenyatta University in Nairobi, Kenya.

Nabhany is known for writing poems of Swahili life genre. He wrote mostly didactic poetry on religious practice such as Mwangaza wa Dini (1976) in Kiswahili, and Sambo ya Kiwandeo (1979).

=== Awards ===
Nabhany was one of the scholar recognized for his key role in the development of African literature. Nabhany was also credited with assisting in the collection of Swahili and Arabic manuscripts for the University of Dar es Salaam as well as the translation of Swahili Arabic manuscripts for the Hamburg University in Germany. He won The Order of the Grand Warrior, and an honorary doctorate at the Islamic University in Uganda, where he was a lecturer.

== Death ==
Nabhany died on 27 February 2017 in his home at Matondoni, and was buried in the Muslim Cemetery, Matondoni, Lamu county, Kenya.

== Selected works ==
- Nabhany, A.S. (2012). Kandi ya Kiswahili (in Swahili). AERA Kiswahili Researched Products. p. 172. ISBN 978-9987-548-28-6.
- Nabhany, A.S.; Shariff, I.N. (1985). Umbuji wa kiwandeo (in Swahili). East African Publishing House. p. 90.
- Kijuma, Muhammad; Hichens, William; Miehe, Gudrun; Vierke, Clarissa; Nabhany, Ahmed Sheikh; Dammann, Ernst (2010). Written at Germany. Muhamadi Kijuma. Köln: Rüdiger Köppe Verlag. p. 532. ISBN 978-3-89645-174-3. OCLC 701516824.
- Nabhany, A. S. (1985). Umbuji wa mnazi: Ahmed Sheikh Nabhany; mhariri A.A.A. El-Maawy. Kenya: East African Publishing House.
- Nabhany, A. S. (1979). Sambo ya Kiwandeo: utungo wa Ahmed Sheikh Nabhany kwa bahari ya ut̲end̲i. Leiden, Netherlands: Afrika-Studiecentrum.
- Sheikh, A. A., Nabhany, A. S. (1972). Utendi wa Mwana Kupona: na Utendi wa Ngamia na Paa. Tanzania: Heinemann Educational Books.
- Nabhany, Ahmed Sheikh; Miehe, Gudrun; Schadeberg, Thilo C. (1979). Sambo ya Kiwandeo (in Swahili). Leiden, Netherlands: Afrika-Studiecentrum. ISBN 978-90-70110-26-0. OCLC 906468286.
- Nabhany, Ahmed Sheikh (2011). Mapisi ya waswahili na lugha yao ya kiswahili (in Swahili). Dar es Salaam, Tanzania: AERA Kiswahili researched products. p. 51. ISBN 978-9987-548-24-8.

=== Anthologies ===
- Nabhany, Ahmed Sheikh (30 December 2020). Swahili Poetry Anthology Vol.1. Horizon Art. p. 111. ISBN 978-99969-4-640-0.
