= Mathias E. Mnyampala =

Tanzanian writer

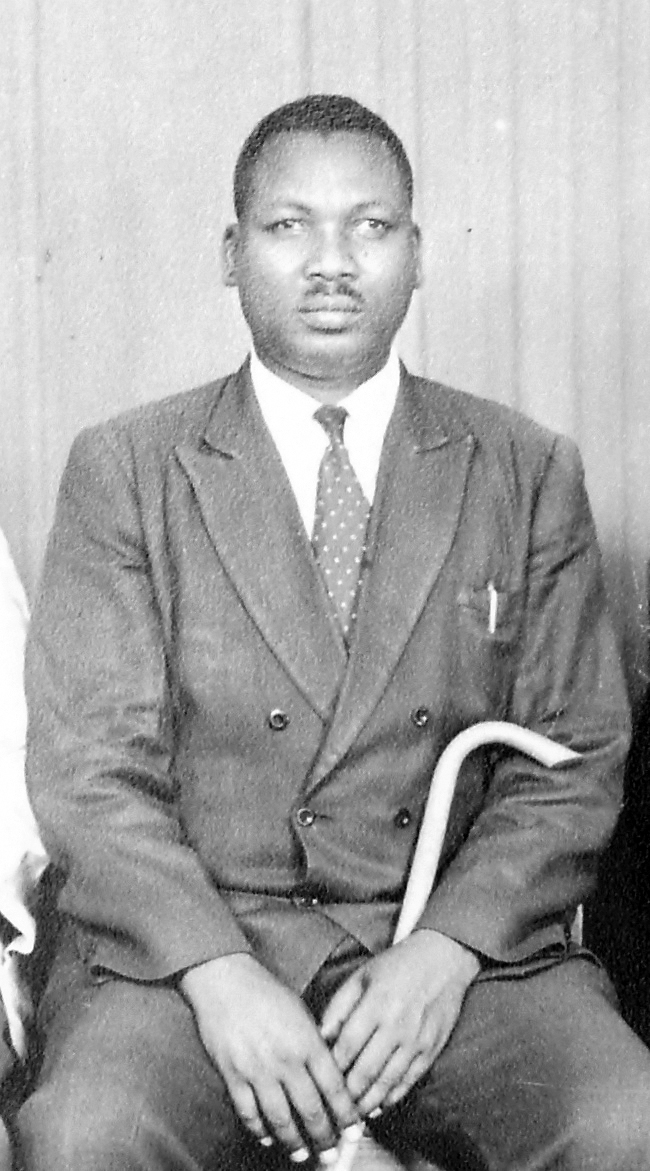

Mathias Eugen Mnyampala (1917–1969) was a Tanzanian writer, lawyer, and poet.

== Biography ==
Mnyampala was born on 18 November 1917 according to a personal record form but he wrote in his autobiography, Maisha ni kugharimia, first published posthumously in 2013 from his 1968-1969 manuscript, that he only knew the year with accuracy. He was born in the hamlet of Muntundya depending on the village of Ihumwa in Chamwino District in Dodoma region at the time part of German East Africa. He died on 8 June 1969 in Dodoma city, Tanzania. Mnyampala wrote in Swahili, the lingua franca of East Africa, not Cigogo, the native language of his ethnic group.

Mnyampala wrote more than 25 books. Among them was Historia, mila, na desturi za Wagogo, a history of the Gogo people commissioned by the British colonial government. This book was translated into English by Gregory H. Maddox and published in 1995 as The Gogo: History, Customs, and Traditions.

Mathias E. Mnyampala was working as a tax clerk for the Native Treasury in Dodoma during the colonial rule. He was intended to travel the whole Ugogo region in order to collect the tax and establish a census of the populations and their belongings. This is why he entered into contact with the watemi, the Gogo traditional kings and rainmakers, who allowed him to write this historical book by giving him the oral sources of his ten years long work. The author was pioneering in Kiswahili in the early 1940s the ethno-history trend and in the same time was a faithful messenger for special correspondences between the then Freedom Fighters Movement called Tanganyika African National Union (TANU) and the Watemi.

After the independence of Tanganyika in 1961, Mathias E. Mnyampala continued his administrative career in the judicial system as a magistrate. His former pro-TANU sympathies and his literary talent allowed him to become the national chairman of the association of Kiswahili poets called Usanifu wa Kiswahili na Ushairi Tanzania (UKUTA). This association was in charge to promote the diffusion of Kiswahili, the official language of the new Tanzanian nation, by teaching to the Tanzanian masses the classical forms of Kiswahili poetry and their conservative transformations.

== Selected bibliography ==
- Historia, mila, na desturi za Wagogo wa Tanganyika. Eagle Press. 1954.
- Utenzi wa Enjili Takatifu. Ndanda Mission Press. 1962.
- Diwani ya Mnyampala (Vol. 5). East African Literature Bureau. 1963.
- Ngonjera za ukuta. Oxford University Press. 1970.
- The Gogo: History, Customs, and Traditions. Sharpe. 1995.
- Historia ya Hayati Sheikh Kaluta Amri Abedi (1924-1964). Ahmadiyya Mission Press. 2011. ISBN 9789976891645.
- Maisha ni kugharimia (in Swahili) (Mathias E. Mnyampala's autobiography, first published posthumously in 2013 from a 1968–1969 manuscript. ed.). Paris, France: DL2A - Buluu Publishing. 2013. ISBN 9791092789027. Google Books HAL Zenodo
- Ugogo na ardhi yake (in Swahili) (First published posthumously in 2014 from a 1961 manuscript. ed.). France: DL2A Buluu Publishing. 2014. ISBN 9791092789201. Google Books HAL

== Relevant literature ==
- Arenberg, Meg. "Tanzanian Ujamaa and the Shifting Politics of Swahili Poetic Form." Research in African Literatures 50, no. 3 (2019): 7-28.
- Longinus, Ponera Denice. "Nafasi ya ukristo katika ushairi wa Mnyampala." PhD diss., Chuo Kikuu cha Dodoma, 2015.
- Mathieu Roy, Warren D. M. Reed. 2014. The woman hidden in the Diwani ya Mnyampala. 2014. ffhalshs01052772f website
- Rettová, Alena. "A solitary war? Genre, community and philosophy in Swahili culture: The Literary fortunes of Mathias Mnyampala." Journal of African Cultural Studies 28, no. 2 (2016): 209-224.
- Roy, Mathieu. "Mathias Mnyampala: poésie et politique en Tanzanie." Études littéraires africaines 24 (2007): 30-35.
