= Lara Nabhan =

Lebanese TV presenter and journalist

- لارا نبهان
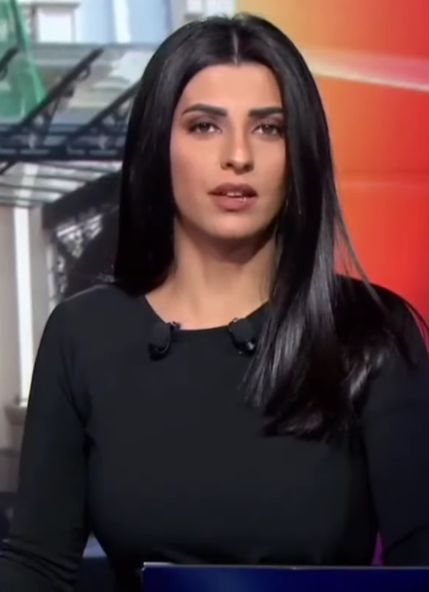
- Born: July 17, 1989 (age 37); Zahlé, Lebanon
- Education: Antonine University
- Occupations: Television presenter and journalist
- Employer: Al-Arabiya
- Children: 2

Lara Nabhan (born 17 July 1989) is a Lebanese journalist, who works for Al Arabiya channel.

Born in Zahlé, Lebanon, on July 17, 1989. She was educated at Antonine University.

Since 2012, she has been working on the Al Arabiya channel, from Dubai in the United Arab Emirates, where she also lives.
