= Sawadiya - Nabhan =

Sawadiya - Nabhan السوادية نبهان
- Village
- Location in Syria
- Country: Syria
- Governorate: Idlib
- District: Jisr al-Shughur District
- Subdistrict: Darkush Nahiyah

Population (2004)
  - Total: 995
- Time zone: UTC+2 (EET)
  - Summer (DST): UTC+3 (EEST)
- City Qrya Pcode: C4236

Sawadiya - Nabhan (Arabic: السوادية نبهان) is a Syrian village located in Darkush Nahiyah in Jisr al-Shughur District, Idlib. According to the Syria Central Bureau of Statistics (CBS), Sawadiya - Nabhan had a population of 995 in the 2004 census.
