= Bajuni dialect =

Variety of Swahili

Bajuni
- Kibajuni
- Native to: Kenya, Somalia
- Ethnicity: Bajuni
- Language family: Niger–Congo?: Atlantic–Congo; Benue–Congo; Bantoid; Bantu; Northeast Coast Bantu; Sabaki; Swahili; Bajuni

Language codes
- ISO 639-3: –
- Glottolog: baju1245
- Guthrie code: G.41

Bajuni (Kibajuni), also known as Tikulu (Tikuu), is a Bantu language related to Swahili spoken by the Bajuni people who inhabit the tiny Bajuni Islands and coastal Kenya, in addition to parts of southern Somalia, where they constitute a minority ethnic group. Maho (2009) considers it a distinct dialect. Nurse & Hinnebusch classify it as a northern dialect of Swahili.

== Consonant Inventory ==
The consonant inventory is as follows.

		Labial	Dental	Alveolar	Palatal	Velar	Glottal
Stop	prenasalized	ᵐb	ⁿd̪	ⁿdr	ⁿɟ	ᵑɡ	
Stop	implosives	(ɓ)	(ɗ̪)		ʄ	ɠ	
Stop	voiceless unaspirated	p	t̪		c	k	
Stop	voiceless aspirated	pʰ	t̪ʰ		cʰ	kʰ	
Fricative	voiced	v	ð			(ɣ)	
Fricative	voiceless	f	(θ)	s	ʃ	(x)	h
Approximant				l, (r)	j	w (ʋ)	
Nasals		m	n̪	n	ɲ	ŋ	

Note: [ⁿdr] represents a sound pronounced with an r-like offglide.

== See also ==
- Bajuni people
