= Kutchi-Swahili =

Creole derived from Kutchi and Swahili languages

- Asian Swahili
- Jangbari / جنگباري / જંગબારી
- Native to: Tanzania, Kenya
- Region: Zanzibar, larger cities
- Native speakers: 45,000 (2002)
- Language family: Swahili-based creole

Language codes
- ISO 639-3: ccl
- Glottolog: cutc1238
- Guthrie code: G40A,B

Kutchi-Swahili, or Cutchi-Swahili, is a Swahili-based creole derived from the Kutchi language of the Kutch district in the Indian state of Gujarat and spoken among the Indian population of East Africa. It is the native language of some Kutchi families from Zanzibar that have settled in the larger cities of mainland Tanzania and Kenya, and is used as a second language by others of the Indian community. In these areas of East Africa, the language is typically only used by Muslim groups, whereas Hindu groups use Gujarati instead.

In the language, words that are taken from Swahili are often modified to fit Kutchi pronunciation patterns; for instance, the Swahili word sahani, meaning "plate", becomes saani in Kutchi-Swahili.

Maho (2009) assigns different codes to Kutchi-Swahili and Asian Swahili (Kibabu), and Ethnologue also notes that these may not be the same.
