= Bajuni people =

Bantu ethnic group in Kenya & Somalia

Bajuni
Wabajuni
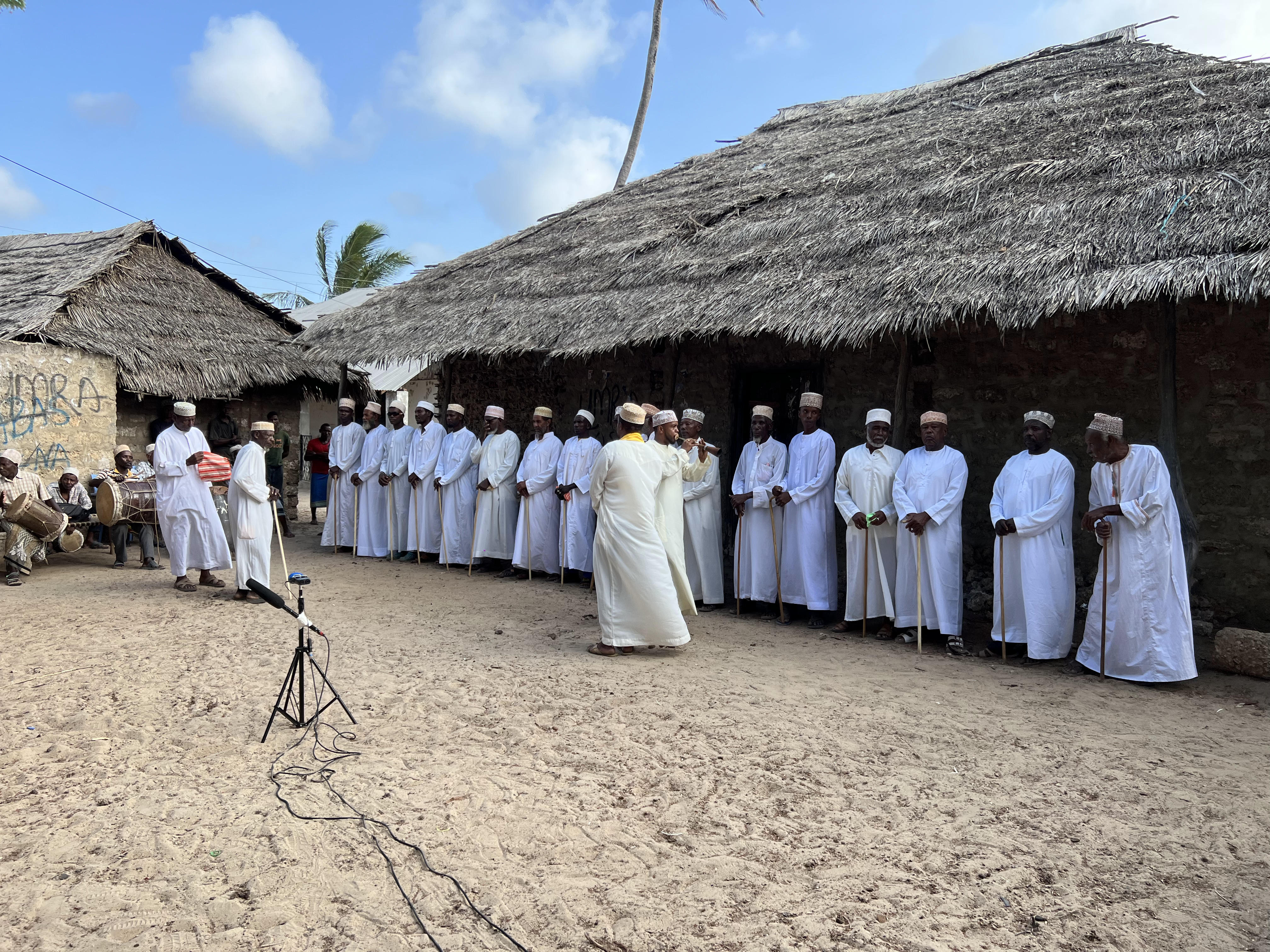
- Bajuni in Lamu, Kenya.

Total population
- 112,000

Regions with significant populations
- Kenya: 91,500
- Somalia: 20,500

Languages
- Kibajuni, Swahili, Somali

Religion
- Islam

Related ethnic groups
- Swahili, Benadiri and Comorians

The Bajuni people (Swahili: Wabajuni) are a Bantu ethnic group who live primarily in the city of Mombasa in Kenya. Many relocated from southern Somalia to Kenya due to war with the Oromo clan Orma, who drove them out from their ancestral territory.

== Overview ==
The Bajuni people group originally principally inhabited the Bajuni Islands in the Somali Sea. Many also traditionally reside in Kenya, mainly in Mombasa and other towns in that country's Coast Province.

The population's members trace their origins to diverse groups; primarily coastal Bantu peoples along the Swahili coast and Somalis from the mainland. They additionally trace their ancestry from later arrivals such as Arabs, Persians, and Somalis who have migrated there from other regions of Somalia. Some also have Malay and Indonesian ancestry. Bajuni clan names are of two kinds, one of Bantu origin while the others are southern Somali in origin, and one clan is even called the Garre. The Katwa clan are also of Somali origin.

The Bajuni follow the laws of Islam to conduct their affairs. Being Shafite Muslims, their lives revolve around the mosque and daily prayers. In the course of saying five prayers a day, they also wash at least five times. Every Muslim parent insists on giving his child the basic Islamic education. A Muslim judge, or kadhi, handles the criminal and civil disputes of the community.

When a child is born, it is held up by the father, a friend, or a teacher, who recites the traditional call of prayer into its ear. From the moment of birth, the child is instructed in the basic teachings of Islam. Men are the working breadwinners. A woman's place among the Bajuni is usually in the home. She customarily leaves the house only to visit or to go to the market. Her visiting is done late in the afternoon when the housework is finished and the children are playing. The husbands like to gather at a men's meeting place or the mosque.

The Bajuni are traditionally fishermen and sailors. Some also pursue other trades such as metalwork.

== History ==
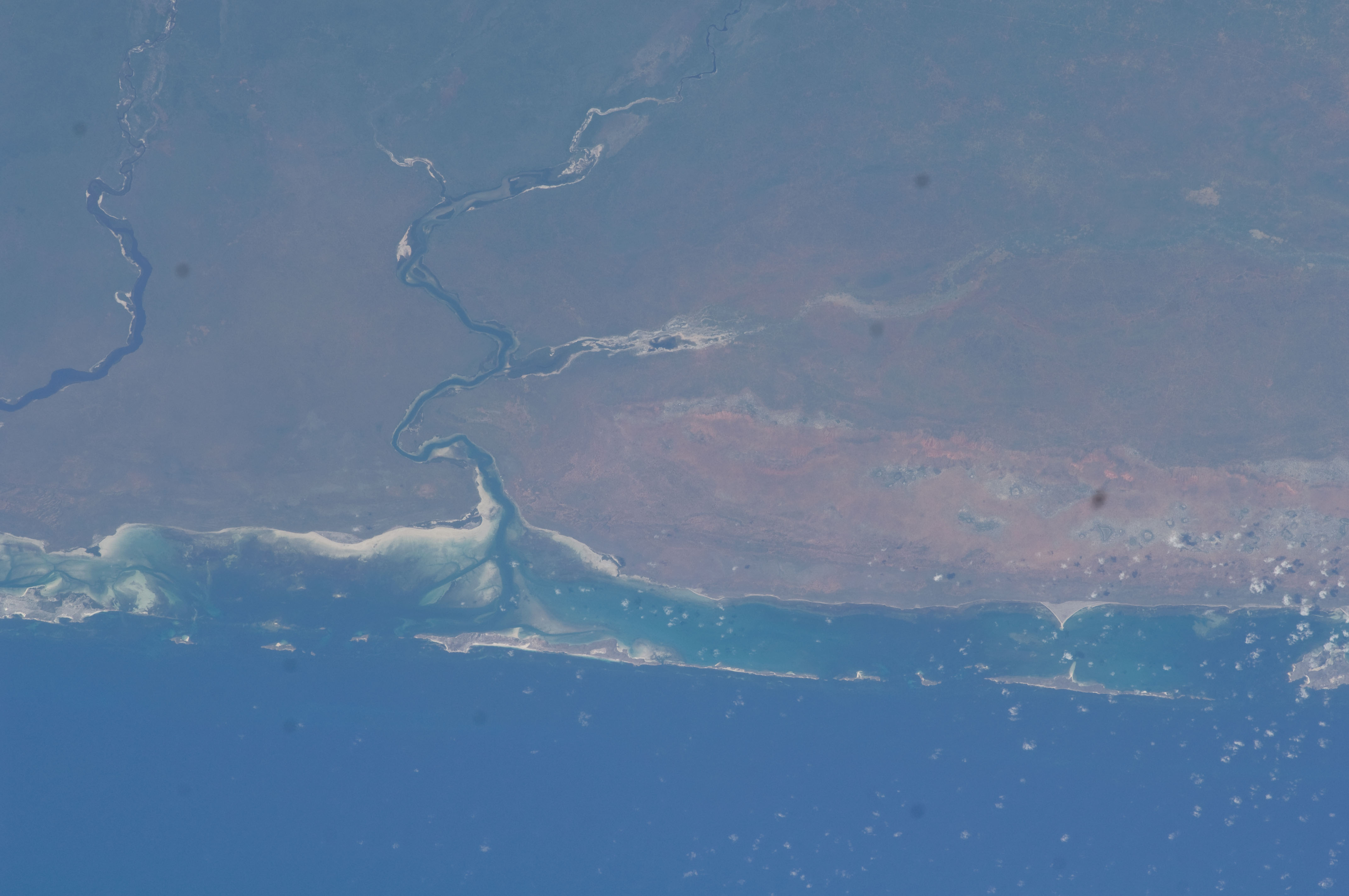
The Bajuni Islands chain extending along the southern Somali coast near Kismayo, viewed from the International Space Station in 2009.

As a result, several Bajuni made their way into the Lamu Archipelago on their own. Bajuni traditions confirm recorded accounts from Lamu and Pate that by the sixteenth century, Lamu, Pate, Shela, and other Swahili towns were flourishing. According to a Bajuni legend, the Bajuni and Portuguese came on this stretch of the coast at the same time, in the sixteenth century, however they disagree on who arrived first. Many settled around the northern Kenyan coast and offshore islands, where they discovered Lamu Archipelago residents living in cities with coral-built houses. This continued until the 1960s, allowing for a steady ebb and flow of people.

The period from the 16th century to the 1960s appears to have been pretty steady. Bajuni communities extended from Mogadishu to the Tana River in the south. It is possible that there were Bajuni villages further south, but if so, they were washed away by the Orma invasion of the sixteenth century, and modern archaeology cannot distinguish Bajuni from other Swahili ruins. Along the whole coastline, Bajuni culture and language were and still are relatively consistent, thanks to continual mobility of people between communities and a common way of life centered on the twin poles of fishing and cultivation. Bajuni, like all other Swahili, sailed far and wide, reaching the entire Swahili territory from Somalia to Kenya and Tanzania, and even beyond.

By 1960, Somalia (then Italian Somaliland) gained its freedom from colonial governance. Kenya gained its independence in December 1963.

=== Displacement and discrimination ===
The Orma encroachments of the 16th century, like the Somali attacks of the 1960s, marked a major watershed in Bajuni fortunes: Bajuni resentment of both the Orma and the Somali is strong, and some elders speak with equal venom about the Orma and the Somali, as if the events of the sixteenth century were only yesterday. Prior to the arrival of the Orma, the Bajuni were forced to move south from Somalia to Kenya, or to the Somali offshore islands, or were slaughtered. The Orma are known as mwingi kama ntanga wa ifi (as many as grains of earth). Prior to the Orma invasion, the main Bajuni homeland and the majority of the inhabitants were in southern Somalia; after that, it relocated south to Kenya.

Despite the fact that additional Swahili settlers arrived from the north and Bajuni fishermen had traditionally used the Kenyan coast as a seasonal fishing ground, Watamu was a small, minor community until the 1960s. Many Bajuni resettled in Watamu after being forced to abandon mainland settlements by criminals operating near the Somali border.

Since the Somali incursions of the 1960s, most Kenyan Bajuni, except those who have gone upcountry or elsewhere along the coast – to Malindi, Mombasa, or Tanzania – have lived on the northern off shore islands, particularly Pate Island, where Bajuni settlements such as Kidhingichini thrive. The 1978 Bajuni population on the northern shore was around 15,000, with prior estimates inflated by an official decision requiring everyone living on the northern coast to register as Bajuni.

Prior to the 1960s, the bulk of Bajuni lived on the mainland coast. Somali attacks led many people to migrate to the outlying islands, a migratory trend that appears to have been a characteristic of Bajuni life for several centuries. Although very few people were killed, the continuous razing of dwellings, robbery of animals, burning of crops, and general terror campaign discouraged mainland Bajuni to the point where they evacuated en masse, either to the islands or further away. Self-defense was difficult because, despite the Bajuni's developed competence with rifles for hunting, the post-independence authorities confiscated their weapons. Prior to the shifta conflicts, there were roughly a dozen villages between Mkokotoni and Kiunga, with several hundred inhabitants on average; as of 1978, just four villages exist, with a total population of 1,000.

Initially, Bajuni was given positions in the nascent hotel industry in Watumu. Wage labor, on the other hand, is a source of income that many Swahili equate with slavery, and most immediately quit or were fired. Few Bajuni now work at the five major international tourist hotels in or near Watamu. As tourism grew in popularity, the Bajuni fishermen's maritime industry was put under strain. The establishment of a Marine National Park restricted fishing rights in specific locations.

The Kenya National Assembly Official Record (Hansard) contains several records of land ownership and rights discussions. One official record, dated Jun 24 – Jul 30 1971 documents a discussion of traditionally Bajuni lands (Lamu, Kenya) and dissenting opinions as to ownership. In the official record of May 28 – Jul 4 1974, there were questions regarding what government actually had jurisdiction over the Bajuni tribal lands.

With the downfall of the Somali government in 1991, Bajuni people experienced abandonment by both the Somalia and Kenyan governments. The Bajuni refer to this period as "The Troubles". This marginalization led Chairman of the Bajuni, Mohamed Ismail Barkale to petition Africa's Intergovernmental Authority on Development for the lawful rights of the Bajuni people in December 2003. Barkale was made a delegate to the 2003 Somali peace talks.

== Language and culture ==
The Bajuni people collectively refer to themselves and are known as Wabajuni. They speak Kibajuni, a dialect of the Bantu Swahili language. Kibajuni is spoken only by the Bajuni people and is an important indicator of their ethnicity. This is essential because the ethnicity of the Bajuni defines their social standing in the Somali patrilineal clan structure. As the Bajuni are generally not considered ethnic Somalis, they are one of the least empowered of the clans in Somalia, and are often disregarded or discriminated against by many members of other Somali clans.

The term homa, which means fever or high temperature, is derived directly from Arabic. However, many Bajuni use the term baridi or cold to refer to both the homa of standard Swahili and any sickness. As a result, someone suffering with baridi is sick.

The Bajuni have a treasure of songs and poetry. Aside from the well-known mashairi and t'endi from the rest of the Swahili coast, there are also vave and randa, farmer songs, and kimayi, a fisherfolk song. All of these, as well as lengthy oral traditions known to the majority of the community's elder male members, typically refer to events that occurred around and before the Orma advance. Because oral recollections of events before the sixteenth century, whether official or impromptu, accord in basic outline but differ in detail, what follows is a recap of the areas of agreement.

The Watamu Bajuni call themselves waungwana, meaning freeborn. Any slave ancestry has largely been forgotten, and other communities accept Bajuni claims of freeborn status. Although the Bajuni retain ties to the villages from where they relocated to Watamu, movement allows for the re-definition of ethnicity and rank. "Slaves" (wachumwa) are now considered outsiders, and local Giriama are treated and behave as a servant class. Intermarriage between Bajuni and Giriama, on the other hand, undermines the master-servant relationship. Such encounters are typically facilitated by Giriama, refers to as "intermediary Swahili," or people who seek to become Swahili through the adoption of Islam and Swahili culture.

Bajuni men wear kikoy, a Swahili blanket wrapped around the waist like a shirt, and rubber thongs on their feet. Bajun ladies wear discrete black veils that reveal just their eyes to the outside world. A woman would traditionally wear a ring through the center of her nose, a gold disk through one pierced nostril, and numerous earrings through the tops of her ears. These are now considered outmoded.

=== Cultural Heritage project ===
The Bajuni Cultural Heritage website was developed as part of a project titled Safeguarding the Cultural Heritage of Bajuni Dialect of Swahili, Oral Traditions, and Poetry. This initiative is implemented by Twaweza Communications in partnership with the Swahili Resource Centre and Shungwaya Welfare Association, with funding from the British Council’s Cultural Protection Fund. It aims to document and archive the intangible cultural heritage of the Bajuni community including language, oral tradition, poetry, proverbs, and cultural knowledge to preserve it for future generations.)

=== Bajuni identity and language ===
Although many academic sources classify the Bajuni dialect as part of the Swahili language due to structural closeness, community members often self-identify as distinctly Bajuni and not simply Swahili. Some Bajuni claim a unique heritage with oral traditions that trace origins to Shungwaya, and some narratives include descent from Yemeni ancestors who intermarried with local agriculturists. The community speaks Kitikuu (Kibajuni), a variety of Swahili that can be difficult for speakers of other Swahili dialects to understand.

=== Geography and livelihood ===
The Bajuni are a minority community primarily found in southern Somalia around Kismayu and along the northern Kenyan coast in villages such as Tchundwa, Shella, Ndabwe, Ishamsini, and Witu. They traditionally engage in fishing, farming, and trading along the East African coast. The community is organized into clans (Ukoo or Khamasi) that influence social and cultural practices such as marriage.

=== Cultural content and archive ===
The website hosts a variety of materials documenting Bajuni oral traditions, poetry (shairi), traditional songs, proverbs, riddles, and cultural practices. It includes resources on life events such as childbirth, initiation rites, traditional medicine, and funeral customs, reflecting deep-rooted community values and practices.

- Bajuni Cultural Heritage – A cultural archive documenting the language, oral traditions, poetry, and heritage of the Bajuni community.
