= KiKAR =

Swahili pidgin spoken in British colonial East Africa

- Kikeya
- Region: British East Africa
- Era: mid 20th century
- Language family: Swahili pidgin

Language codes
- ISO 639-3: –
- Glottolog: kika1240
- Guthrie code: G.40H

KiKAR (also known as Kikeya) is, or was, a Swahili pidgin spoken among the King's African Rifles (KAR) of British colonial East Africa (now Kenya, Uganda, Tanzania). Although there were, by design, no native Swahili speakers among the KAR, Swahili still functioned as the lingua franca, and a simplified version of it served as a military jargon and pidgin for the troops.

Most of the remaining knowledge of KiKAR comes from H. W. Newell's unpublished guide titled Notes on Ki-Swahili as Spoken by the KAR. Newell was an officer who served with the 5th battalion and who wrote the guide to help newly seconded officers get a grasp of the language.

It is not clear if KiKAR is still spoken. Maho (2009) does not list it as extinct.

== Origin ==
The name KiKAR is formed from the Swahili prefix 'ki-' which denotes 'the language of', for example in kiSwahili meaning "the Swahili Language". In this case, KAR is the acronym abbreviation of King's African Rifles, who spoke the language, and thus it could be translated as "the language of the King's African Rifles".

Before the introduction of Swahili as the official language of the KAR in the late 1930s, KiKAR was used to tackle the communication problem which arose from the cultural diversity of the recruits who came from such ethnolingusitic groups as the Luo, Kalenjin, and Kamba peoples, and also from the fact that the presiding British officers were unlikely to speak Swahili and certainly did not speak any of the other East-African languages.

Mungai Mutonya and Timothy H. Parsons of the Washington University in St. Louis explain the formation of KiKAR as the natural response to such an impasse:

The natural tendency for groups of people faced with such a linguistic impasse is to seek a compromise language that breaks existing communication barriers.

— Mungai Mutonya and Timothy H. Parsons, KiKAR: a Swahili variety in Kenya’s colonial army

The 3rd and 5th Battalions of the KAR were best known for their extensive use of KiKAR while the officers of the 6th Battalion prided themselves on their command of a more grammatically standard form of Swahili. The Ugandan 4th Battalion relied on the simplified form of Sudanese Arabic, KiNubi, before switching to KiKAR in the 1930s (although they used a form more similar to standard Swahili than the 3rd and 5th Battalions). The 1st and 2nd Battalions, native to Nyasaland (modern-day Malawi), used ChiNyanja as their language of command.

Soldiers in the KAR certainly used KiKAR in formal military activities (such as drills or parades), however the degree to which troops used the language to communicate amongst themselves despite the linguistic barriers many of them faced. Mutonya and Parsons suggest that the use of English by the African troops to address their officers was seen as "presumptuous".

== Grammar ==
While the native Swahili spoken at the time utilised 5 noun class pairs and 3 unpaired classes, KiKAR had a reduced set of only four pairs of classes. These noun classes were M-/WA-, M-/MI-, KI-/VI-, and N-/N- where the first three of these were taken from Swahili and the final pair (N-/N-) was a so-called "miscellaneous" class. According to Mutonya and Parsons, H. W. Newell said in his guide “to classify all nouns not in one of the other classes as being of this [N-]class”. The simplified system of noun classes also lessened the complexity of much of the grammar which arises from the larger set of noun classes, for example, nasal assimilation rules and more complex plurals. Further simplification came from the simplification of context-dependent grammatical rules. For example, the process by which plurals and imperatives were formed was simplified such that it was less dependent on context and the rules of agreement for interrogatives were mostly ignored.

The KiKAR lexicon took many borrowings from English and also from other Bantu languages. Many of the borrowings from English were words relating to military life. In particular, words which described equipment, marksmanship, clothing, and ranks as well as commands and numbers. Some English words were borrowed and restructured to fit more easily we Swahili phonotactics, for example bayoneti for 'bayonet'. Sometimes English words were combined with Swahili words in phrases like kupiga miss which meant 'to miss a target'. Many words taken directly from Swahili gained a more specifically military meaning, for example, kukamua which meant 'to wring/milk' in Swahili meant 'to press' in KiKAR or hivi hivi which meant 'haphazard' in Swahili and 'upside-down' in KiKAR. Words in KiKAR were also derived from other native African languages, for example, manyatta which meant 'village' in KiKAR and likely came from the Maasai word of the same spelling which meant 'a settlement for warriors or boys'. There were also words loaned from Arabic and Turkish via KiNubi (which some of the members of the KAR would have also spoken), for example, maktab meaning 'office' which comes from Arabic and korokon which meant 'guard room' and which came from the KiNubi karakol which meant "guard" and was borrowed from Turkish.
