= Jambur, Gujarat =

Jambur
- village
- Location within Gujarat Location within India
- Coordinates: 21°08′07″N 70°52′03″E
- Country: India
- State: Gujarat
- District: Girsomnath

Population
  - Total: about 5,000

Languages
  - Official: Gujarati
- Time zone: UTC+5:30 (IST)
- PIN: 362150
- Telephone code: 02877
- Vehicle registration: GJ 32-
- Vidhan Sabha constituency: Talala (Vidhan Sabha constituency)
- Lok Sabha constituency: Junagadh (Lok Sabha constituency)
- Climate: Hot and humid (Köppen)

Jambur is a village in Gir Somnath district of Gujarat, India. It is located near Gir Forest National Park, 68 kilometres (42 mi) south of the district headquarters at Junagadh and 377 kilometres (234 mi) from the state capital of Gandhinagar. Jambur is known for being home for centuries to some members of the African-origin Siddi tribe.

== See also ==
- Talala, Gujarat
- Africa–India relations
