= Swahili =

Indigenous Bantu language

- Kiswahili; Lugha ya Kiswahili كِسوَحِلِ
- Pronunciation: Swahili: [kiswɑˈhili]
- Native to: Tanzania, Kenya, Mozambique, Democratic Republic of the Congo, the Bajuni Islands and Brava, southern Somalia
- Speakers: L1: 5.3 million (2019–2023); L2: 92 million (2019–2021)
- Language family: Niger–Congo: Atlantic–Congo; Volta–Congo; Benue–Congo; Bantoid; Southern Bantoid; Bantu; Northeast Bantu; Northeast Coast Bantu; Sabaki; Swahili
- Early form: Proto-Swahili
- Dialects: Bravanese; Bajuni; Congo Swahili; Makwe; Mwani; Sidi; Socotra †
- Writing system: Latin script (Swahili alphabet); Arabic script (Swahili Ajami); Mandombe script; Swahili Braille

Official status
- Official language in: Tanzania; DR Congo (national language); Kenya; Uganda; Rwanda Organisations: African Union; East African Community; SADC
- Recognised minority language in: Burundi; Mozambique
- Regulated by: Baraza la Kiswahili la Taifa (Tanzania); Chama cha Kiswahili cha Taifa (Kenya); Baraza la Kiswahili la Afrika Mashariki (Uganda)

Language codes
- ISO 639-1: sw
- ISO 639-2: swa
- ISO 639-3: swa – inclusive code Individual codes: swc – Congo Swahili swh – Coastal Swahili ymk – Makwe (?) wmw – Mwani (?)
- Glottolog: swah1254
- Guthrie code: G.42–43; G.40.A–H (pidgins & creoles)
- Linguasphere: 99-AUS-m
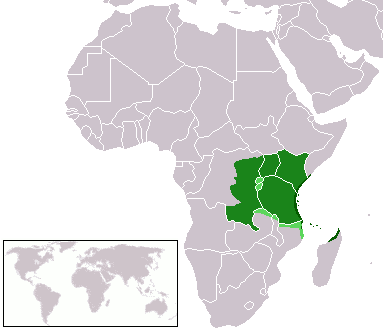
- Geographic-administrative extent of Swahili. Dark: native range (the Swahili coast). Medium green: Spoken by a majority alongside indigenous languages. Light green: Spoken by a minority.

- Person: Mswahili
- People: Waswahili
- Language: Kiswahili

Swahili, (Note: /swɑːˈhiːli/ swah-HEE-lee) also known as Kiswahili, (Note: /ˌkiːswɑːˈhiːli/ KEE-swah-HEE-lee; an endonym meaning 'Swahili language') is a Bantu language of the Atlantic–Congo language family, originally spoken by the Swahili people, who are found primarily in Tanzania, Kenya, and Mozambique (along the East African coast and adjacent littoral islands). Estimates of the number of Swahili speakers, including both native and second-language speakers, generally range from 40 million to 200 million. Most native speakers reside in Tanzania and Kenya.

About 40% of Swahili vocabulary consists of Arabic loanwords, including the name of the language itself (سَوَاحِلي sawāḥilī, a plural adjectival form of an Arabic word meaning 'of the coasts'). Swahili also has a significant number of loanwords from Portuguese, English and German. The Arabic loanwords date from the era of contact between Arab slave traders and the Bantu inhabitants of the east coast of Africa, which was also the time period when Swahili emerged as a lingua franca in the region.

Due to concerted efforts by the governments of Tanzania and Kenya, Swahili is one of three official languages (alongside English and French) of the East African Community (EAC) countries, which are Kenya, Tanzania, Burundi, the Democratic Republic of the Congo, Rwanda, Somalia, South Sudan, and Uganda. It is the lingua franca of other areas in the African Great Lakes region and East and Southern Africa. Swahili is also one of the working languages of the African Union and of the Southern African Development Community. The East African Community created an institution called the East African Kiswahili Commission (EAKC) which began operations in 2015. The institution currently serves as the leading body for promoting the language in the East African region, as well as for coordinating its development and usage for regional integration and sustainable development. In recent years Somalia, South Africa, Botswana, Namibia, Ethiopia, and South Sudan have begun offering Swahili as a subject in schools or have developed plans to do so.

Shikomor (or Comorian), an official language in Comoros that is also spoken in Mayotte (Shimaore), is closely related to Swahili and is sometimes considered a dialect, although other authorities consider it a distinct language. In 2022, based on Swahili's growth as a prominent international language, the United Nations declared Swahili Language Day as 7 July to commemorate the date that Julius Nyerere adopted Swahili as a unifying language for Tanganyikan independence struggles.

== Classification ==
Swahili is a Bantu language of the Sabaki branch. In Guthrie's geographic classification, Swahili is in Bantu zone G, whereas the other Sabaki languages are in zone E70, commonly under the name Nyika. Historical linguists consider the Arabic influence on Swahili to be significant, since about 40% of its vocabulary is taken directly from Arabic, and it was initially spoken along the East African coast.

== History ==
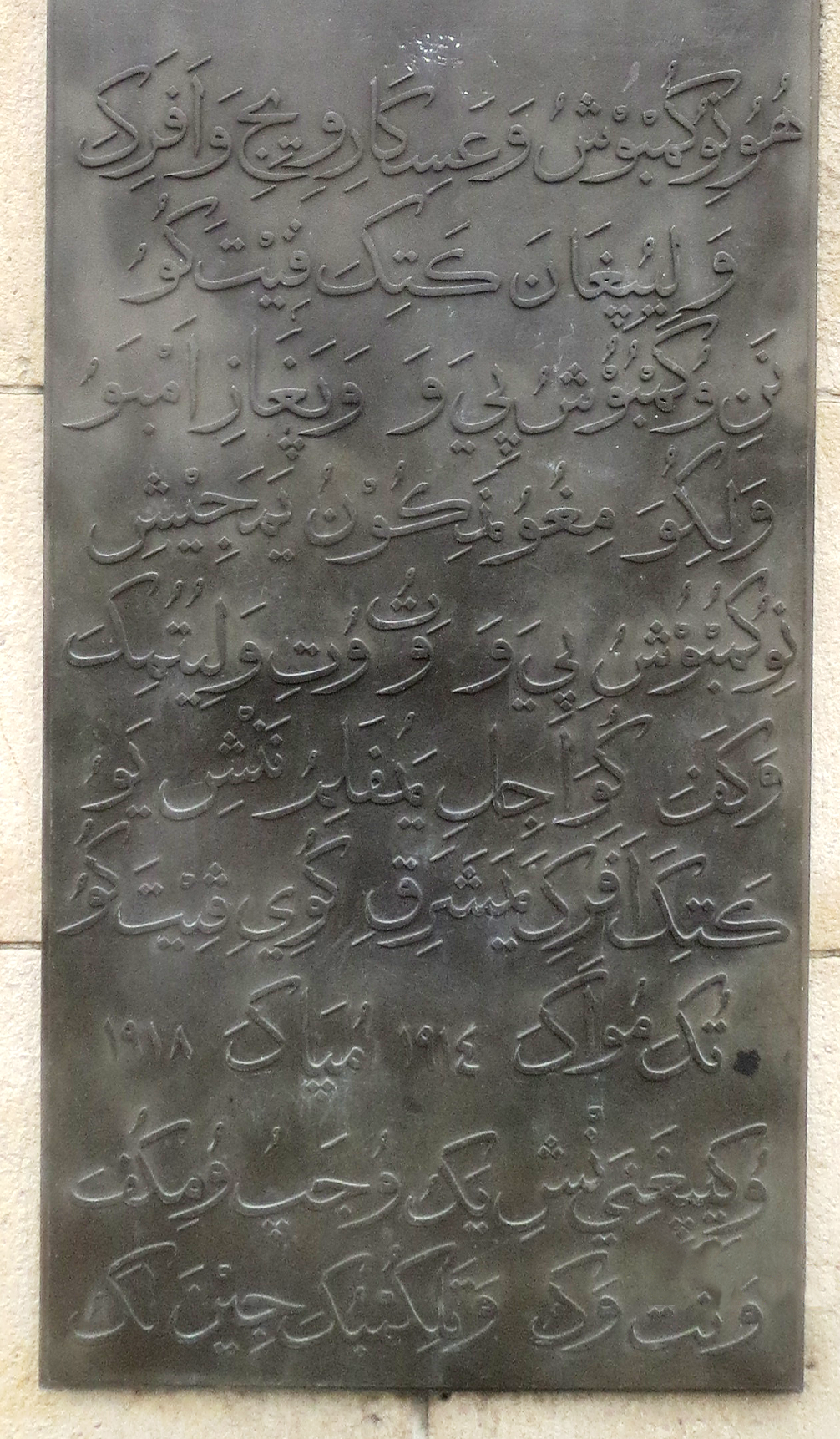
Swahili in Arabic script—memorial plate at the Askari Monument, Dar es Salaam (1927)

=== Etymology ===
The word "Swahili" comes from an Arabic name for the area, meaning "coasts":

سَاحِل	→	سَوَاحِل	→	سَوَاحِلِيّ
sāḥil		sawāḥil		sawāḥilī
"coast"		"coasts" (broken plural)		"coastal" or "coastal inhabitant"

=== Origin ===
The core of the Swahili language originates in Bantu languages of the coast of East Africa. Much of Swahili's Bantu vocabulary has cognates in the Unguja, Pemba, and Mijikenda languages and, to a lesser extent, other East African Bantu languages. While opinions vary on the specifics, it has been historically purported that about 16–20% of the Swahili vocabulary is derived from loan words, the vast majority Arabic, but also other contributing languages, including Persian, Hindustani, Portuguese, and Malay. The South Cushitic languages preceded the Bantu languages in today's Tanzania and Kenya, and have left many loanwords in Bantu languages in the interior of the countries, but they had very little direct impact on Swahili or the other Sabaki languages spoken on the coast.

Source languages for loanwords in Swahili
Source languages	Percentage
Arabic (mainly Omani Arabic)	40%
English	4.6%
Portuguese	0.9–1.0%
Hindustani	0.7–3.9%
Persian (mainly Iranian Persian)	0.4–3.4%
Malagasy	0.2–0.4%

Omani Arabic is the source of most Arabic loanwords in Swahili. In the text "Early Swahili History Reconsidered", however, Thomas Spear noted that Swahili retains a large amount of grammar, vocabulary, and sounds inherited from the Sabaki language. In fact, while taking account of daily vocabulary, using lists of one hundred words, 72–91% were inherited from the Sabaki language (which is reported as a parent language) whereas 4–17% were loan words from other African languages. Only 2–8% were from non-African languages, and Arabic loan words constituted a fraction of that. According to other sources, about 40% of the Swahili vocabulary comes from Arabic. What also remained unconsidered was that a good number of the borrowed terms had Bantu equivalents. The preferred use of Arabic loan words is prevalent along the coast, where local people, in a cultural show of proximity to, or descent from, Arab culture, would rather use loan words, whereas the people in the interior tend to use the Bantu equivalents. It was originally written in Arabic script.

The earliest known documents written in Swahili are letters written in Kilwa, Tanzania, in 1711 in the Arabic script that were sent to the Portuguese of Mozambique and their local allies. The original letters are preserved in the Historical Archives of Goa, India.

=== Colonial period ===
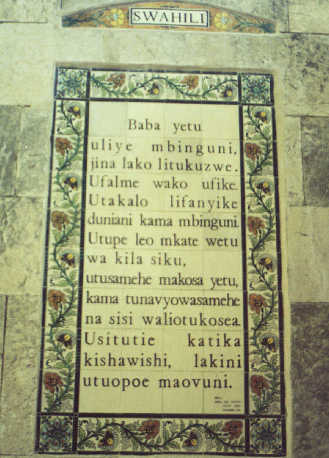
Although originally written with the Arabic script, Swahili is now written in a Latin alphabet introduced by Christian missionaries and colonial administrators. The text shown here is the Catholic version of the Lord's Prayer.

Various colonial powers that ruled on the coast of East Africa played a role in the growth and spread of Swahili. With the arrival of the Arabs in East Africa, they used Swahili as a language of trade as well as for teaching Islam to the local Bantu peoples. This resulted in Swahili first being written in the Arabic script. The later contact with the Portuguese resulted in the increase of vocabulary of the Swahili language. The language was formalised in an institutional level when the Germans took over after the Berlin Conference. After seeing there was already a widespread language, the Germans formalised it as the official language to be used in schools. Thus schools in Swahili are called Shule (from German Schule) in government, trade and the court system. With the Germans controlling the major Swahili-speaking region in East Africa, they changed the alphabet system from Arabic to Latin. After the First World War, Britain took over German East Africa, where they found Swahili rooted in most areas, not just the coastal regions. The British decided to formalise it as the language to be used across the East African region (although in British East Africa [Kenya and Uganda] most areas used English and various Nilotic and other Bantu languages while Swahili was mostly restricted to the coast). In June 1928, an inter-territorial conference attended by representatives of Kenya, Tanganyika, Uganda, and Zanzibar took place in Mombasa. The Zanzibar dialect was chosen as standard Swahili for those areas, and the standard orthography for Swahili was adopted.

== Current status ==
=== Overview ===
Estimates of the total number of first- and second-language Swahili speakers vary widely, from as low as 50 million to as high as 200 million, but generally range from 60 million to 150 million.

Swahili has become a second language spoken by tens of millions of people in the five African Great Lakes countries (Kenya, DR Congo, Rwanda, Uganda, and Tanzania), where it is an official or national language. It is also the first language for many people in Tanzania, especially in the coastal regions of Tanga, Pwani, Dar es Salaam, Mtwara and Lindi. In the inner regions of Tanzania, Swahili is spoken with an accent influenced by other local languages and dialects. There, it is a first language for most of the people who are born in the cities, whilst being spoken as a second language in rural areas. Swahili and closely related languages are spoken by relatively small numbers of people in Burundi, Comoros, Malawi, Mozambique, Zambia and Rwanda. The language was still understood in the southern ports of the Red Sea in the 20th century. The East African Community created an institution called the East African Kiswahili Commission (EAKC) which began operations in 2015. The institution currently serves as the leading body for promoting the language in the East African region, as well as for coordinating its development and usage for regional integration and sustainable development.

Swahili is among the first languages in Africa for which language technology applications have been developed. Arvi Hurskainen is one of the early developers. The applications include a spelling checker, part-of-speech tagging, language learning software, an analysed Swahili text corpus of 25 million words, an electronic dictionary, and machine translation between Swahili and English. The development of language technology also strengthens the position of Swahili as a modern medium of communication.

=== Tanzania ===
The widespread use of Swahili as a national language in Tanzania came after Tanganyika gained independence in 1961 and the government decided that it would be used as a language to unify the new nation. This saw the use of Swahili in all levels of government, trade, art as well as schools in which primary school children are taught in Swahili, before switching to English (medium of instruction) in secondary schools (although Swahili is still taught as an independent subject). After Tanganyika and Zanzibar unification in 1964, Taasisi ya Uchunguzi wa Kiswahili (TUKI, Institute of Swahili Research) was created from the Interterritorial Language Committee. In 1970 TUKI was merged with the University of Dar es Salaam, while Baraza la Kiswahili la Taifa (BAKITA) was formed. BAKITA is an organisation dedicated to the development and advocacy of Swahili as a means of national integration in Tanzania. Key activities mandated for the organisation include creating a healthy atmosphere for the development of Swahili, encouraging use of the language in government and business functions, coordinating activities of other organisations involved with Swahili, standardising the language. BAKITA's vision is: "1.To efficiently manage and coordinate the development and use of Kiswahili in Tanzania 2.To participate fully and effectively in promoting Swahili in East Africa, Africa and the entire world over". Although other bodies and agencies can propose new vocabularies, BAKITA is the only organisation that can approve its usage in the Swahili language. Tanzanians are highly credited for shaping the language to appear the way it is now.

=== Kenya ===
In Kenya, Swahili (or Kiswahili as it is referred to in the Constitution and by the Kenya Law Reform Society ) has been the national language since 1964 and is official since 2010. Chama cha Kiswahili cha Taifa (CHAKITA) was established in 1998 to research and promote Kiswahili language in Kenya. Kiswahili is a compulsory subject in all Kenyan primary and secondary schools.

=== Congo ===
Swahili is recognized as a national language in the Democratic Republic of the Congo and is widely spoken in the eastern regions (South Kivu, North Kivu, Maniema and Sankuru), southern region (Haut-Katanga Province, Lualaba, Lomami, Haut Lomami, Tanganyika ), northern region (Ituri, Tshopo, Haut Uele and Kinshasa (minority)). The local dialects of Swahili in Congo are known as Congo Swahili and differ considerably from Standard Swahili.

=== Burundi ===
In order to strengthen political ties with other East African Community nations, both Kiswahili and English have been taught in Burundian elementary schools since the academic year 2005/2006. Kiswahili is now used widely in Burundi but is not recognised as an official language; only French, Kirundi, and English have this distinction. Since 2013, Swahili has been included in the all Burundian education system.

=== Uganda ===
Uganda adopted Kiswahili as one of its official languages (alongside English) in 2022, and also made it compulsory across primary and secondary schools in the country.

=== Somalia ===
The Somali language is the national and primary first language of Somalia. The Swahili language is not widespread in Somalia and has no official status nationally or regionally. Dialects of Swahili are spoken by some ethnic minorities on the Bajuni islands in the form of Kibajuni on the southern tip of the country and in the town of Brava in the form of Chimwiini; both contain a significant amount of Somali and Italian loanwords. Standard Swahili is generally only spoken by Somali nationals who have resided in Kenya and subsequently returned to Somalia. A closely related language, Mushunguli (also known as Zigula, Zigua, or Chizigua), is spoken by some of the Somali Bantu ethnic minority mostly living in the Jubba Valley. It is classified as a Northeast Coast Bantu language, a linguistic sub-category of which Swahili also belongs to.

In 2024, Somalia joined the East African Community and its inclusion may facilitate the spread of the Swahili language in Somalia. Nevertheless, in Somalia, Swahili, as a foreign language, will have to compete with English, the primary global lingua franca, and Arabic, the official second language of Somalia and a liturgical language for Muslims, as popular secondary or tertiary languages. Consequently, there is significant uncertainty regarding the adoption of the Swahili language in Somalia compared to the situation in most other EAC member states.

== Religious and political identity ==
=== Religion ===
Swahili played a major role in spreading both Christianity and Islam in East Africa. From their arrival in East Africa, Arabs brought Islam and set up madrasas, where they used Swahili to teach Islam to the natives. As the Arab population and influence expanded, a growing number of indigenous people converted to Islam and began receiving religious and cultural instruction in Swahili, which increasingly absorbed Arabic vocabulary.

With the arrival of Europeans in East Africa, Christianity was introduced to the region, profoundly shaping the development of Swahili. While Arab influence remained concentrated along the coastal areas, European missionaries ventured further inland, establishing missions and promoting Christian teachings. Early outposts were located along the coast, where they encountered Swahili as a widely spoken lingua franca. Recognizing its utility and structural similarities to other indigenous languages, the Europeans adopted Swahili as a medium for evangelization, religious and general educational instruction, and, eventually, colonization.

=== Politics ===
During the struggle for Tanganyika independence, the Tanganyika African National Union used Swahili as a language of mass organisation and political movement. This included publishing pamphlets and radio broadcasts to rally the people to fight for independence. After gaining independence, Swahili was adopted as the national language under Julius Nyerere's policy of Ujamaa, which used the language as a tool to foster a shared national identity across more than 120 ethnic groups, in contrast to many other African states that retained colonial languages for official use. To this day, Tanzanians carry a sense of pride when it comes to Swahili, especially when it is used to unite over 120 tribes across Tanzania. Swahili was used to strengthen solidarity within the nation, and remains a key identity marker of the Tanzanian people.

== Phonology ==
Example of spoken Swahili

=== Vowels ===
Standard Swahili has five vowel phonemes: /ɑ/, /ɛ/, /i/, /ɔ/, and /u/. According to Ellen Contini-Morava, vowels are never reduced, regardless of stress. However, according to Edgar Polomé, these five phonemes can vary in pronunciation. Polomé claims that /ɛ/, /i/, /ɔ/, and /u/ are pronounced as such only in stressed syllables. In unstressed syllables, as well as before a prenasalized consonant, they are pronounced as [e], [ɪ], [o], and [ʊ]. E is also commonly pronounced as mid-position after w. Polomé claims that /ɑ/ is pronounced as such only after w and is pronounced as [a] in other situations, especially after /j/ (y). A can be pronounced as [ə] in word-final position. Long vowels in Swahili are written as doubled vowels (for example, kondoo, "sheep") due to a historical process in which /l/ became elided between the second last and last vowels of a word (for example, kondoo, "sheep" was originally kondolo, which survives in certain dialects). As a consequence, long vowels are not considered phonemic. A similar process exists in Zulu.

=== Consonants ===
Swahili consonant phonemes
		Labial	Dental	Alveolar	Palatal (-alveolar)	Velar	Glottal
Nasal		m		n	ɲ ⟨ny⟩	ŋ ⟨ng'⟩	
Plosive/ Affricate	prenasal	ᵐb̥ ⟨mb⟩		ⁿd̥ ⟨nd⟩	ⁿd̥ʒ̊ ⟨nj⟩	ᵑɡ̊ ⟨ng⟩	
Plosive/ Affricate	voiced/ implosive	ɓ ~ b ⟨b⟩		ɗ ~ d ⟨d⟩	ʄ ~ dʒ ⟨j⟩	ɠ ~ ɡ ⟨g⟩	
Plosive/ Affricate	tenuis	p		t	tʃ ⟨ch⟩	k	
Plosive/ Affricate	aspirated	(pʰ) ⟨p⟩		(tʰ) ⟨t⟩	(tʃʰ) ⟨ch⟩	(kʰ) ⟨k⟩	
Fricative	prenasal	ᶬv̥ ⟨mv⟩		ⁿz̥ ⟨nz⟩			
Fricative	voiced	v	(ð) ⟨dh⟩	z		(ɣ) ⟨gh⟩	
Fricative	voiceless	f	(θ) ⟨th⟩	s	ʃ ⟨sh⟩	(x) ⟨kh⟩	h
Approximant				l	j ⟨y⟩	w	
Rhotic				r			

Where not shown, the orthography is the same as IPA.

Some dialects of Swahili may also have the aspirated phonemes /pʰ tʰ tʃʰ kʰ bʱ dʱ dʒʱ ɡʱ/ though they are unmarked in Swahili's orthography. Multiple studies favour classifying prenasalization as consonant clusters, not as separate phonemes. Historically, nasalization has been lost before voiceless consonants, and subsequently the voiced consonants have devoiced, though they are still written mb, nd etc. The /r/ phoneme is realised as either a short trill [r] or more commonly as a single tap [ɾ] by most speakers. [x] exists in free variation with h, and is only distinguished by some speakers. In some Arabic loans (nouns, verbs, adjectives), emphasis or intensity is expressed by reproducing the original emphatic consonants /dˤ, sˤ, tˤ, ðˤ/ and the uvular /q/, or lengthening a vowel, where aspiration would be used in inherited Bantu words.

Unlike most Bantu languages, Swahili is not tonal.

== Orthography ==
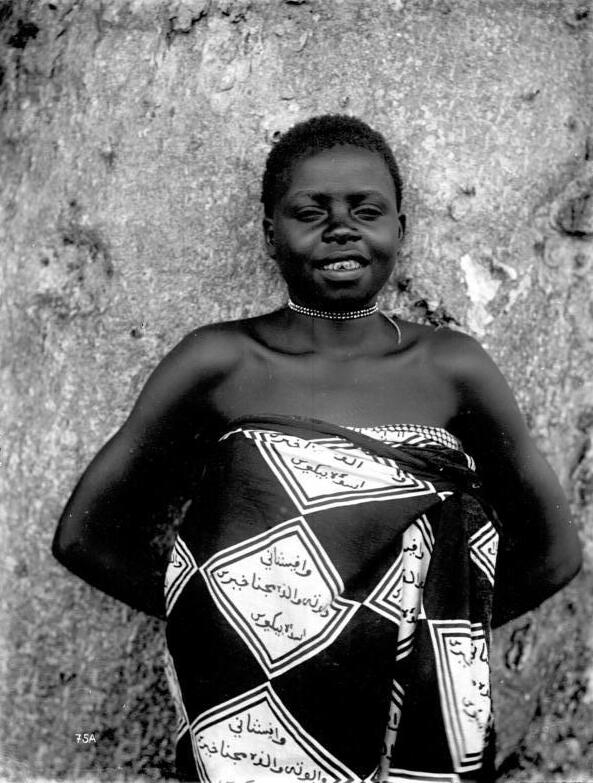
Swahili in Arabic script on the clothes of a girl in German East Africa (c. early 1900s)

Swahili is now written in the Latin alphabet. There are a few digraphs for native sounds, ch, sh, ng' and ny; q and x are not used, c is not used apart from the digraph ch, unassimilated English loans and, occasionally, as a substitute for k in advertisements. There are also several digraphs for Arabic sounds, which many speakers outside of ethnic Swahili areas have trouble differentiating.

The language used to be primarily written in the Ajami script, which is an Arabic script. Much literature was produced in this script. With the introduction of Latin, the use of Ajami script has been diminished significantly. However, the language continues to have a tradition of being written in Arabic script. Starting from the later half of the 19th century, continuing into the 20th century, and going on in the 21st century, a process of "Swahilization" of the Arabic script has been underway by Swahili scribes and scholars. The first of such attempts was made by Mwalimu Sikujua, a scholar and poet from Mombasa. However, the spread of a standardized indigenous variation of Arabic script for Swahili was hampered by the colonial takeover of East Africa by the United Kingdom and Germany. The usage of Arabic script was suppressed in German East Africa and to a lesser extent in British East Africa. Nevertheless, well into the 1930s and 1940s, rural literacy rate in Arabic script as well as a local preference to write Swahili in the Arabic script (an unmodified version as opposed to proposals such as that of Mwalimu Sikujua) was relatively high. There were also differences in orthographic conventions between cities and authors and over the centuries, some quite precise but others different enough to cause difficulties with intelligibility. Thus despite a lack of official governmental backing, attempts at standardization and Swahilization of the Arabic script continued into the 20th century.

== Grammar ==
=== Noun classes ===
Swahili nouns are separable into classes, which are roughly analogous to genders in other languages. In Swahili, prefixes mark groups of similar objects: ⟨m-⟩ marks single human beings (mtoto 'child'), ⟨wa-⟩ marks multiple humans (watoto 'children'), ⟨u-⟩ marks abstract nouns (utoto 'childhood'), and so on. And just as adjectives and pronouns must agree with the gender of nouns in some languages with grammatical gender, so in Swahili adjectives, pronouns and even verbs must agree with nouns. This is a characteristic feature of all the Bantu languages.

==== Semantic motivation ====
The ki-/vi- class historically consisted of two separate genders, artefacts (Bantu class 7/8, utensils and hand tools mostly) and diminutives (Bantu class 12/13), which were conflated at a stage ancestral to Swahili. Examples of the former are kisu "knife", kiti "chair" (from mti "tree, wood"), chombo "vessel" (a contraction of ki-ombo). Examples of the latter are kitoto "infant", from mtoto "child"; kitawi "frond", from tawi "branch"; and chumba (ki-umba) "room", from nyumba "house". It is the diminutive sense that has been furthest extended.

An extension common to diminutives in many languages is approximation and resemblance (having a 'little bit' of some characteristic, like -y or -ish in English). For example, there is kijani "green", from jani "leaf" (compare English 'leafy'), kichaka "bush" from chaka "clump", and kivuli "shadow" from uvuli "shade". A 'little bit' of a verb would be an instance of an action, and such instantiations (usually not very active ones) are found: kifo "death", from the verb -fa "to die"; kiota "nest" from -ota "to brood"; chakula "food" from kula "to eat"; kivuko "a ford, a pass" from -vuka "to cross"; and kilimia "the Pleiades", from -limia "to farm with", from its role in guiding planting.

A resemblance, or being a bit like something, implies marginal status in a category, so things that are marginal examples of their class may take the ki-/vi- prefixes. One example is chura (ki-ura) "frog", which is only half terrestrial and therefore is marginal as an animal. This extension may account for disabilities as well: kilema "a cripple", kipofu "a blind person", kiziwi "a deaf person".

Finally, diminutives often denote contempt, and contempt is sometimes expressed against things that are dangerous. This might be the historical explanation for kifaru "rhinoceros", kingugwa "spotted hyena", and kiboko "hippopotamus" (perhaps originally meaning "stubby legs").

Another class with broad semantic extension is the m-/mi- class (Bantu classes 3/4). This is often called the 'tree' class, because mti, miti "tree(s)" is the prototypical example. However, it seems to cover vital entities neither human nor typical animals: trees and other plants, such as mwitu 'forest' and mtama 'millet' (and from there, things made from plants, like mkeka 'mat'); supernatural and natural forces, such as mwezi 'moon', mlima 'mountain', mto 'river'; active things, such as moto 'fire', including active body parts (moyo 'heart', mkono 'hand, arm'); and human groups, which are vital but not themselves human, such as mji 'village', and, by analogy, mzinga 'beehive/cannon'. From the central idea of tree, which is thin, tall, and spreading, comes an extension to other long or extended things or parts of things, such as mwavuli 'umbrella', moshi 'smoke', msumari 'nail'; and from activity there even come active instantiations of verbs, such as mfuo "metal forging", from -fua "to forge", or mlio "a sound", from -lia "to make a sound".

Words may be connected to their class by more than one metaphor. For example, mkono is an active body part, and mto is an active natural force, but they are also both long and thin. Things with a trajectory, such as mpaka 'border' and mwendo 'journey', are classified with long thin things, as in many other languages with noun classes. This may be further extended to anything dealing with time, such as mwaka 'year' and perhaps mshahara 'wages'. Animals exceptional in some way and so not easily fitting in the other classes may be placed in this class.

The other classes have foundations that may at first seem similarly counterintuitive. In short,

- Classes 1–2 include most words for people: kin terms, professions, ethnicities, etc., including translations of most English words ending in -er. They include a couple of generic words for animals: mnyama 'beast', mdudu 'bug'.
- Classes 5–6 have a broad semantic range of groups, expanses, and augmentatives. Although interrelated, it is easier to illustrate if broken down:
  - Augmentatives, such as joka 'serpent' from nyoka 'snake', lead to titles and other terms of respect (the opposite of diminutives, which lead to terms of contempt): Bwana 'Sir', shangazi 'aunt', fundi 'craftsman', kadhi 'judge'
  - Expanses: ziwa 'lake', bonde 'valley', taifa 'country', anga 'sky'
    - from this, mass nouns: maji 'water', vumbi 'dust' (and other liquids and fine particulates that may cover broad expanses), kaa 'charcoal', mali 'wealth', maridhawa 'abundance'
  - Collectives: kundi 'group', kabila 'language/ethnic group', jeshi 'army', daraja ' stairs', manyoya 'fur, feathers', mapesa 'small change', manyasi 'weeds', jongoo 'millipede' (large set of legs), marimba 'xylophone' (large set of keys)
    - from this, individual things found in groups: jiwe 'stone', tawi 'branch', ua 'flower', tunda 'fruit' (also the names of most fruits), yai 'egg', mapacha 'twins', jino 'tooth', tumbo 'stomach' (cf. English "guts"), and paired body parts such as jicho 'eye', bawa 'wing', etc.
    - also collective or dialogic actions, which occur among groups of people: neno 'a word', from kunena 'to speak' (and by extension, mental verbal processes: wazo 'thought', maana 'meaning'); pigo 'a stroke, blow', from kupiga 'to hit'; gomvi 'a quarrel', shauri 'advice, plan', kosa 'mistake', jambo 'affair', penzi 'love', jibu 'answer', agano 'promise', malipo 'payment'
    - From pairing, reproduction is suggested as another extension (fruit, egg, testicle, flower, twins, etc.), but these generally duplicate one or more of the subcategories above
- Classes 9–10 are used for most typical animals: ndege 'bird', samaki 'fish', and the specific names of typical beasts, birds, and bugs. However, this is the 'other' class, for words not fitting well elsewhere, and about half of the class 9–10 nouns are foreign loanwords. Loans may be classified as 9–10 because they lack the prefixes inherent in other classes, and most native class 9–10 nouns have no prefix. Thus they do not form a coherent semantic class, though there are still semantic extensions from individual words.
- Class 11 (which takes class 10 for the plural) are mostly nouns with an "extended outline shape", in either one dimension or two:
  - mass nouns that are generally localized rather than covering vast expanses: uji 'porridge', wali 'cooked rice'
  - broad: ukuta 'wall', ukucha 'fingernail', upande 'side' (≈ ubavu 'rib'), wavu 'net', wayo 'sole, footprint', ua 'fence, yard', uteo 'winnowing basket'
  - long: utambi 'wick', utepe 'stripe', uta 'bow', ubavu 'rib', ufa 'crack', unywele 'a hair'
    - from 'a hair', singulatives of nouns, which are often class 6 ('collectives') in the plural: unyoya 'a feather', uvumbi 'a mote of dust', ushanga 'a bead'.
- Class 14 are abstractions, such as utoto 'childhood' (from mtoto 'a child') and have no plural. They have the same prefixes and concord as class 11, except optionally for adjectival concord.
- Class 15 are verbal infinitives.
- Classes 16–18 are locatives. The Bantu nouns of these classes have been lost; the only permanent member is the Arabic loan mahali 'place(s)', but in Mombasa Swahili, the old prefixes survive: pahali 'place', mwahali 'places'. However, any noun with the locative suffix -ni takes class 16–18 agreement. The distinction between them is that class 16 agreement is used if the location is intended to be definite ("at"), class 17 if indefinite ("around") or involves motion ("to, toward"), and class 18 if it involves containment ("within"): mahali pazuri 'a good spot', mahali kuzuri 'a nice area', mahali muzuri (it's nice in there).

==== Borrowing ====
Borrowings may or may not be given a prefix corresponding to the semantic class they fall in. For example, Arabic دود dūd ("bug, insect") was borrowed as mdudu, plural wadudu, with the class 1/2 prefixes m- and wa-, but Arabic فلوس fulūs ("fish scales", plural of فلس fals) and English sloth were borrowed as simply fulusi ("mahi-mahi" fish) and slothi ("sloth"), with no prefix associated with animals (whether those of class 9/10 or 1/2).

In the process of naturalization of borrowings within Swahili, loanwords are often reinterpreted, or reanalysed, as if they already contain a Swahili class prefix. In such cases the interpreted prefix is changed with the usual rules. Consider the following loanwords from Arabic:

1. The Swahili word for "book", kitabu, is borrowed from Arabic كتاب kitāb(un) "book" (plural كتب kutub; from the Arabic root k.t.b. "write"). However, the Swahili plural form of this word ("books") is vitabu, following Bantu grammar in which the ki- of kitabu is reanalysed (reinterpreted) as a nominal class prefix whose plural is vi- (class 7/8).
2. Arabic معلم muʿallim(un) ("teacher", plural معلمون muʿallimūna) was interpreted as having the mw- prefix of class 1, and so became mwalimu, plural walimu.
3. Arabic مدرسة madrasa school, even though it is singular in Arabic (with plural مدارس madāris), was reinterpreted as a class 6 plural madarasa, receiving the singular form darasa.

Similarly, English wire and Arabic وقت waqt ("time") were interpreted as having the class 11 prevocalic prefix w-, and became waya and wakati with plural nyaya and nyakati respectively.

=== Agreement ===
Swahili phrases agree with nouns in a system of concord but, if the noun refers to a human, they accord with noun classes 1–2 regardless of their noun class. Verbs agree with the noun class of their subjects and objects; adjectives, prepositions and demonstratives agree with the noun class of their nouns. In Standard Swahili (Kiswahili sanifu), based on the dialect spoken in Zanzibar, the system is rather complex; however, it is drastically simplified in many local variants where Swahili is not a native language, such as in Nairobi. In non-native Swahili, concord reflects only animacy: human subjects and objects trigger a-, wa- and m-, wa- in verbal concord, while non-human subjects and objects of whatever class trigger i-, zi-. Infinitives vary between standard ku- and reduced i-. ("Of" is animate wa and inanimate ya, za.)

In Standard Swahili, human subjects and objects of whatever class trigger animacy concord in a-, wa- and m-, wa-, and non-human subjects and objects trigger a variety of gender-concord prefixes.

Swahili noun-class concord
NC	Semantic field	Noun -C, -V	Subj.	Obj.	-a	Adjective -C, -i, -e (Note: Most Swahili adjectives begin with either a consonant or the vowels i- or e-, listed separately above. The few adjectives beginning with other vowels do not agree with all noun classes since some are restricted to humans. NC 1 m(w)- is mw- before a and o, and reduces to m- before u; wa- does not change; and ki-, vi-, mi- become ch-, vy-, my- before o but not before u: mwanana, waanana "gentle", mwororo, waororo, myororo, chororo, vyororo "mild, yielding", mume, waume, kiume, viume "male".)
–	I	(mimi)	ni-			
–	we	(sisi)	tu-			
–	thou	(wewe)	u-	ku-		
–	you	(ninyi)	m-	wa-		
1	person	m-, mw-	a-	m-	wa	m-, mwi-, mwe-
2	people	wa-, w-	wa-		wa	wa-, we-, we-
3	tree	m-, mw-	u-		wa	m-, mwi-, mwe-
4	trees	mi-	i-		ya	mi-, mi-, mye-
5	group, AUG	ji-/Ø, j-	li-		la	ji-/Ø, ji-, je-
6	groups, AUG	ma-	ya-		ya	ma-, me-, me-
7	tool, DIM	ki-, ch-	ki-		cha	ki-, ki-, che-
8	tools, DIM	vi-, vy-	vi-		vya	vi-, vi-, vye-
9	animals, 'other', loanwords	N-	i-		ya	N-, nyi-, nye-
10	animals, 'other', loanwords	N-	zi-		za	N-, nyi-, nye-
11	'extension'	u-, w-/uw-	u-		wa	m-, mwi-, mwe-
10	(plural of 11)	N-	zi-		za	N-, nyi-, nye-
14	abstraction	u-, w-/uw-	u-		wa	m-, mwi-, mwe- or u-, wi-, we-
15	infinitives	ku-, kw- (Note: In a few verbs: kwenda, kwisha)	ku-		kwa-	ku-, kwi-, kwe-
16	precise position	-ni, mahali	pa-		pa	pa-, pe-, pe-
17	imprecise position	-ni	ku-		kwa	ku-, kwi-, kwe-
18	internal position	-ni	m(u)-		mwa	mu-, mwi-, mwe-

== Dialects and closely related languages ==
This list is based on Swahili and Sabaki: a linguistic history.

=== Dialects ===
Modern standard Swahili, written in Latin script, is based on Kiunguja, the dialect spoken in Zanzibar City.

Swahili literature and poetry, traditionally written in Swahili Ajami, is based on Kiamu, the dialect of Lamu on the Kenyan Coast.

But there are numerous other dialects of Swahili, some of which are mutually unintelligible, such as the following:

==== Old dialects ====
Maho (2009) considers these to be distinct languages:

- Kimwani is spoken in the Kerimba Islands and northern coastal Mozambique.
- Chimwiini is spoken by the ethnic minorities in and around the town of Barawa on the southern coast of Somalia.
- Kibajuni is spoken by the Bajuni minority ethnic group on the coast and islands on both sides of the Somali–Kenyan border and in the Bajuni Islands (the northern part of the Lamu archipelago) and is also called Kitikuu and Kigunya.
- Socotra Swahili (extinct)
- Sidi, in Gujarat, India (possibly extinct)

The rest of the dialects are divided by him into two groups:

- Mombasa–Lamu Swahili
  - Lamu
    - The dialects of the Lamu group (especially Kiamu, Kipate, Kingozi) are the linguistic base of the oldest (c. 1600 CE) Swahili manuscripts and poems that reached us. They are sometimes described as "literary" dialects but they were also used for everyday life and are still spoken today except Kingozi.
    - Kiamu is spoken in and around the island of Lamu (Amu) and have an important corpus of classical poems of the 18th and 19th centuries written in Arabic script (Kiajemi).
    - Kipate is a local dialect of Pate Island, considered to be closest to the original dialect of Kingozi. It has also an important classical corpus of poems from the 18th and 19th centuries.
    - Kingozi is an extinct dialect spoken on the Indian Ocean coast between Lamu and Somalia and is sometimes still used in poetry. It is often considered the source of Swahili. Academic theories about Kingozi as an old literary dialect are conflicting. It is sometimes linked to the epics of Liongo. For Sacleux, it's and old and "an exclusively literary, arcane dialect". It varies depending on the authors whose will to return to a pure form of the old language make them use Kigunya mainly (Kipate is a subdialect of Kigunya) and secondarily Kiamu and Kimvita. Knappert, on the contrary, states the existence of a literary koine in the 18th century based on the Kingozi as a prestigious and widespread dialect. The 2009 New Updated Guthrie List, a referential classification of the Bantu languages, considers kiOzi as a dialect in itself. It is not the ancestor language of Kiswahili but a member of the Lamu group (code G42a) with Kiamu, Kipate and Kisiu. This brief overview indicates that the state of research is fragmented and uncertain on the history of the kingozi.
  - Mombasa
    - Chijomvu is a subdialect of the Mombasa area.
    - Kimvita is the major dialect of Mombasa (also known as "Mvita", which means "war", in reference to the many wars which were fought over it, the other major dialect alongside Kiunguja. It has an important classical corpus written in Arabic script from the 18st and 19st century.
    - Kingare is the subdialect of the Mombasa area.
  - Kimrima is spoken around Pangani, Vanga, Dar es Salaam, Rufiji and Mafia Island.
  - Kiunguja is spoken in Zanzibar City and environs on Unguja (Zanzibar) Island. Kitumbatu (Pemba) dialects occupy the bulk of the island.
  - Mambrui, Malindi
  - Chichifundi, a dialect of the southern Kenya coast.
  - Chwaka
  - Kivumba, a dialect of the southern Kenya coast.
  - Nosse Be (Madagascar)
- Pemba Swahili
  - Kipemba is a local dialect of the Pemba Island.
  - Kitumbatu and Kimakunduchi are the countryside dialects of the island of Zanzibar. Kimakunduchi is a recent renaming of "Kihadimu"; the old name means "serf" and so is considered pejorative.
  - Makunduchi
  - Mafia, Mbwera
  - Kilwa (extinct)
  - Kimgao used to be spoken around Kilwa District and to the south.

Maho includes the various Comorian dialects as a third group. Most other authorities consider Comorian to be a Sabaki language, distinct from Swahili.

=== Other regions ===
In Somalia, where the Afroasiatic Somali language predominates, a variant of Swahili referred to as Chimwiini (also known as Chimbalazi) is spoken along the Benadir coast by the Bravanese people. Another Swahili dialect known as Kibajuni also serves as the mother tongue of the Bajuni minority ethnic group, which lives in the tiny Bajuni Islands as well as the southern Kismayo region.

In Oman, there are an estimated 52,000 people who speak Swahili as of 2020. Most are descendants of those repatriated after the fall of the Sultanate of Zanzibar.

=== Pidgins and creoles ===
There are Swahili-based slangs, pidgins and creoles:

- Kitaa – Dar es Salaam
- Engsh – Cant from the rich neighbourhoods of Nairobi, Kenya
- KiKAR – Swahili pidgin spoken in British colonial East Africa
- Kutchi-Swahili – Creole derived from Kutchi and Swahili languages
- Settler Swahili – Swahili pidgin from Kenya and Zambia
- Sheng slang – Urban dialect spoken in Kenya

== Swahili poets ==
- Dada Masiti (c. 1810s – 15 July 1919), Kenyan poet
- Shaaban bin Robert (1909–1962), Tanzanian poet, author, and essayist
- Euphrase Kezilahabi (1944–2020), Tanzanian novelist, poet, and scholar
- Mathias E. Mnyampala (1917–1969), Tanzanian writer, lawyer, and poet
- Tumi Molekane (b. 1981), South African rapper and poet
- Fadhy Mtanga (b. 1981), Tanzanian creative writer, photographer, graphic designer
- Christopher Mwashinga (b. 1965), Tanzanian author and poet
- Abdilatif Abdalla (b. 1946), Kenyan poet and political activist. (Note: He was imprisoned for his support of the Kenya People's Union, and wrote the poetry collection Sauti ya Dhiki while in solitary confinement, which was subsequently awarded the Jomo Kenyatta Prize for Literature.)
- Mwana Kupona (d. c. 1865), Kenyan poet.
- Ebrahim Hussein (b. 1943), Tanzanian playwright and poet
- Haji Gora Haji (1933–2021), Tanzanian poet
- Alamin Mazrui (b. 1948), Kenyan poet
- Kithaka wa Mberia (b. 1955), poet
- Ahmed Sheikh Nabhany (1927–2017), Kenyan poet

== Oral literature ==
=== 19th-century collections ===
In 1870, Edward Steere published Swahili Tales as Told by Natives of Zanzibar, a collection of 23 Swahili tales with facing-text English translation, along with a selection of proverbs and riddles. Some of the tales included are: "Kisa cha Punda wa Dobi", "The Story of the Washerman's Donkey", also known as "The Heart of a Monkey"; "Mwalimu Goso", "Goso the Teacher", a cumulative tale; and "Sungura na Simba", "The Hare and the Lion", a story about the trickster hare.

Here are some of the proverbs that Steere recorded in Swahili:

- "Mbio za sakafuni hwishia ukingoni." "Running on a roof ends at the edge of it."
- "Angurumapo simba, mteza nani?" "Who will dance to a lion's roaring?"
- "Mlevi wa mvinyo hulevuka, mlevi wa mali halevuki." "He that is drunk with wine gets sober, he that is drunk with wealth does not."
- "Kikulacho kinguoni mwako." "What bites is in your own clothes."

Here are some of the riddles that Steere recorded in Swahili:

- "Nyumba yangu kubwa, haina mlango (yayi)." "My house is large; it has no door (egg)."
- "Kuku wangu akazalia miibani (nanasi)." "My hen has laid among thorns (pineapple)."
- "Popo mbili zavuka mto (macho)." "Two nuts cross a river (eyes)."

Steere also includes the formulaic announcement of a riddle:

- "Kitendawili! — Tega." "An enigma! — Set your trap."

An anonymous publication from 1881, Swahili Stories from Arab Sources with an English Translation, includes 15 stories in Swahili with English translations, plus an additional 14 Swahili stories that are not translated. There is also a selection of proverbs and riddles with English translations.

Here are some of the proverbs:

- "Tulingane sawasawa, kama sahani na kawa." "We match together, like a dish and a cover."
- "Samaki mmoja akioza, wameoza wote." "If one fish is bad, they are all bad."
- "Wa kuume haukati wa kushoto." "The right hand does not cut the left."
- "Paka akiondoka, panya hutawala." "When the cat goes away, the rat is king."

Here are some of the riddles:

- "Gumugumu huzaa teketeke, gumugumu teketeke huzaa (mahindi)." "The hard is the parent of the soft, and the soft of the hard (maize)."
- "Mtoto wangu killa mwaka hulala chini (boga)." "My child each year lies on the ground (pumpkin)."
- "Nyumba vangu kubwa haina taa (kaburi)." "My great house has no lamp (grave)."
- "Nimetupa mshale wangu, mchana kwenda mbali nikitupa usiku hauendi mbali (macho)." "I cast my arrow in the day time, it went far off; it I cast it at night, it does not go far (eyes)."

For additional collections of Swahili prose from the 19th century, see the inventory in J. D. Rollins's A History of Swahili Prose from Earliest Times to the End of the Nineteenth Century.

=== Additional proverbs ===
Fuata nyuki ule asali.
Follow the bee so that you may eat honey.

Baada ya dhiki faraja.
After hardship comes relief.

Mgaagaa na upwa hali wali mkavu.
The one who busies himself with work will not miss a meal.

Mwacha mila ni mtumwa.
The person who abandons his culture is a slave.

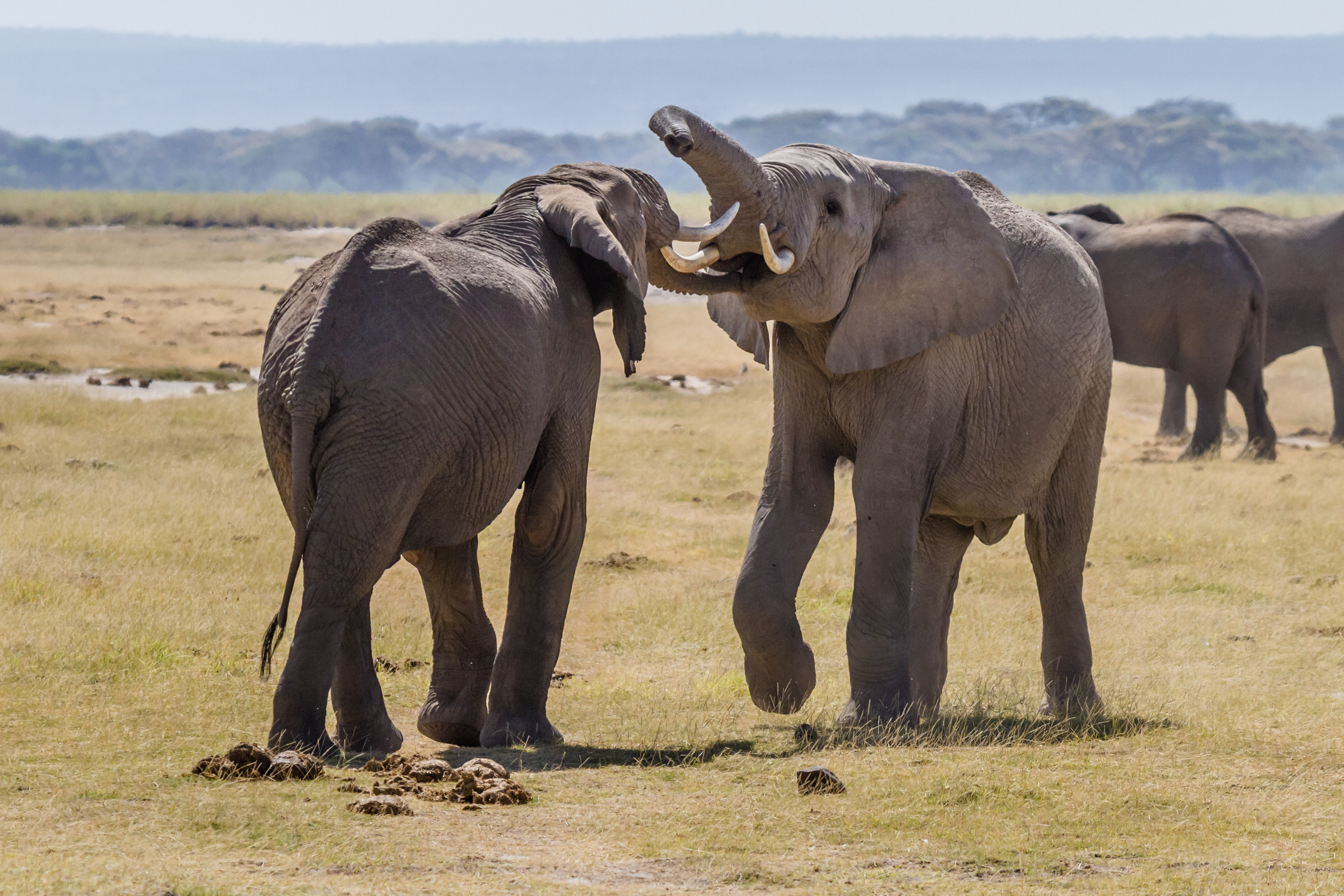
Loxodonta africana elephants frolic in Amboseli National Park, Kenya, 2012.

Two sayings with the same literal meaning of Where elephants fight, the grass is trampled or figuratively speaking, when those with power fight, it is those below them who suffer:

Wapiganapo tembo nyasi huumia.
Fighting elephants damage the grass.

Ndovu wawili wakisongana, ziumiazo ni nyika.
Where two elephants argue, the grassland is damaged.

== Sample text ==
Swahili	English
Kifungu cha 26. 1) Kila mtu ana haki ya kuelimishwa. Elimu yapasa itolewe bure hasa ile ya madarasa ya chini. Elimu ya madarasa ya chini ihudhuriwe kwa lazima. Elimu ya ufundi na ustadi iwe wazi kwa wote. Na elimu ya juu iwe wazi kwa wote kwa kutegemea sifa ya mtu. 2) Elimu itolewe kwa madhumuni ya kuendeleza barabara hali ya binadamu, na kwa shabaha ya kukuza haki za binadamu na uhuru wake wa asili. Elimu ni wajibu ikuze hali ya kueleana, kuvumiliana na ya urafiki kati ya mataifa na kati ya watu wa rangi na dini mbali-mbali. Kadhalika ni wajibu iendeleze shughuli za Umoja wa Mataifa za kudumisha amani. 3) Ni haki ya wazazi kuchagua aina ya elimu ya kufunzwa watoto wao.	Article 26: 1. Everyone has the right to education. Education shall be free, at least in the elementary and fundamental stages. Elementary education shall be compulsory. Technical and professional education shall be made generally available and higher education shall be equally accessible to all on the basis of merit.; 2. Education shall be directed to the full development of the human personality and to the strengthening of respect for human rights and fundamental freedoms. It shall promote understanding, tolerance and friendship among all nations, racial or religious groups, and shall further the activities of the United Nations for the maintenance of peace.; 3. Parents have a prior right to choose the kind of education that shall be given to their children.

== See also ==
- Mandombe script
- Swahili literature
- Settler Swahili
- UCLA Language Materials Project
- Languages of Africa
