= List of bridges in Kenya =

== Major bridges ==
| | Name | Span | Length | Type | Carries Crosses | Opened | Location | County | Ref. |
|---|---|---|---|---|---|---|---|---|---|
| 1 | Mombasa Gate Bridge project | 660 m (2,170 ft) | 1,400 m (4,600 ft) | Cable-stayed; Steel box girder deck 330+660+330 | A14; Malindi–Bagamoyo Highway; Kilindini Harbour | 2028 | Likoni–Mombasa Island; 4°04′17.5″S 39°39′17.3″E | Kwale; Mombasa | |
| 2 | Nyali Bridge | 150 m (490 ft) | 391 m (1,283 ft) | Box girder Prestressed concrete 90+150+90 | B8; Mombasa–Garissa Road; Tudor Creek | 1980 | Mombasa–Mombasa Island; 4°02′34.1″S 39°40′20.9″E | Mombasa | |
| 3 | Mtwapa Bridge | 112 m (367 ft) | 192 m (630 ft) | Box girder Prestressed concrete 40+112+40 | B8; Mombasa–Garissa Road; Mtwapa Creek | 1980 | Mtwapa–Mombasa; 3°57′19.0″S 39°44′29.7″E | Kilifi; Mombasa | |
| 4 | Kilifi Bridge | | 420 m (1,380 ft) | Box girder Prestressed concrete | B8; Mombasa–Garissa Road; Voi River | 1991 | Kilifi–Mnarani; 3°38′10.6″S 39°50′54.5″E | Kilifi | |
| 5 | Nairobi National Park Super Major Bridge | | 6,580 m (21,590 ft) | Box girder Prestressed concrete | Nairobi–Malaba SGR; Nairobi National Park | 2019 | Nairobi; 1°22′14.3″S 36°51′33.7″E | Nairobi City | |
| 6 | Chora Super Major Bridge | | 3,000 m (9,800 ft) | Box girder Prestressed concrete | Nairobi–Malaba SGR | 2019 | Ongata Rongai; 1°24′09.6″S 36°43′10.3″E | Kajiado | |
| 7 | Athi River Super Bridge | | 2,785 m (9,137 ft) | Box girder Prestressed concrete | Mombasa–Nairobi SGR; Mbagathi River | 2017 | Athi River; 1°26′36.6″S 36°58′53.8″E | Machakos | |
| 8 | Tsavo Super Bridge | | 1,987 m (6,519 ft) | Box girder Prestressed concrete | Mombasa–Nairobi SGR; Tsavo River | 2017 | Tsavo; 2°59′27.2″S 38°27′47.6″E | Makueni; Taita–Taveta | |
| 9 | Mteza Bridge | | 1,660 m (5,450 ft) | AASHTO girder Post-tensioned concrete | Mwache Junction-Tsunza-Mteza Section; Mteza Creek | 2024 | Mteza; 4°4′23″S 39°35′15″E | Mteza Creek, Kwale; Kenya | |

== See also ==
- Transport in Kenya
- List of roads in Kenya
- Rail transport in Kenya
- Geography of Kenya
- List of rivers of Kenya
