= List of rivers of Kenya =

Map of Kenya with some of the main rivers.

This is a very short list of rivers in Kenya. This list is arranged by drainage basin, with respective tributaries indented under each larger stream's name.

== Mediterranean Sea ==
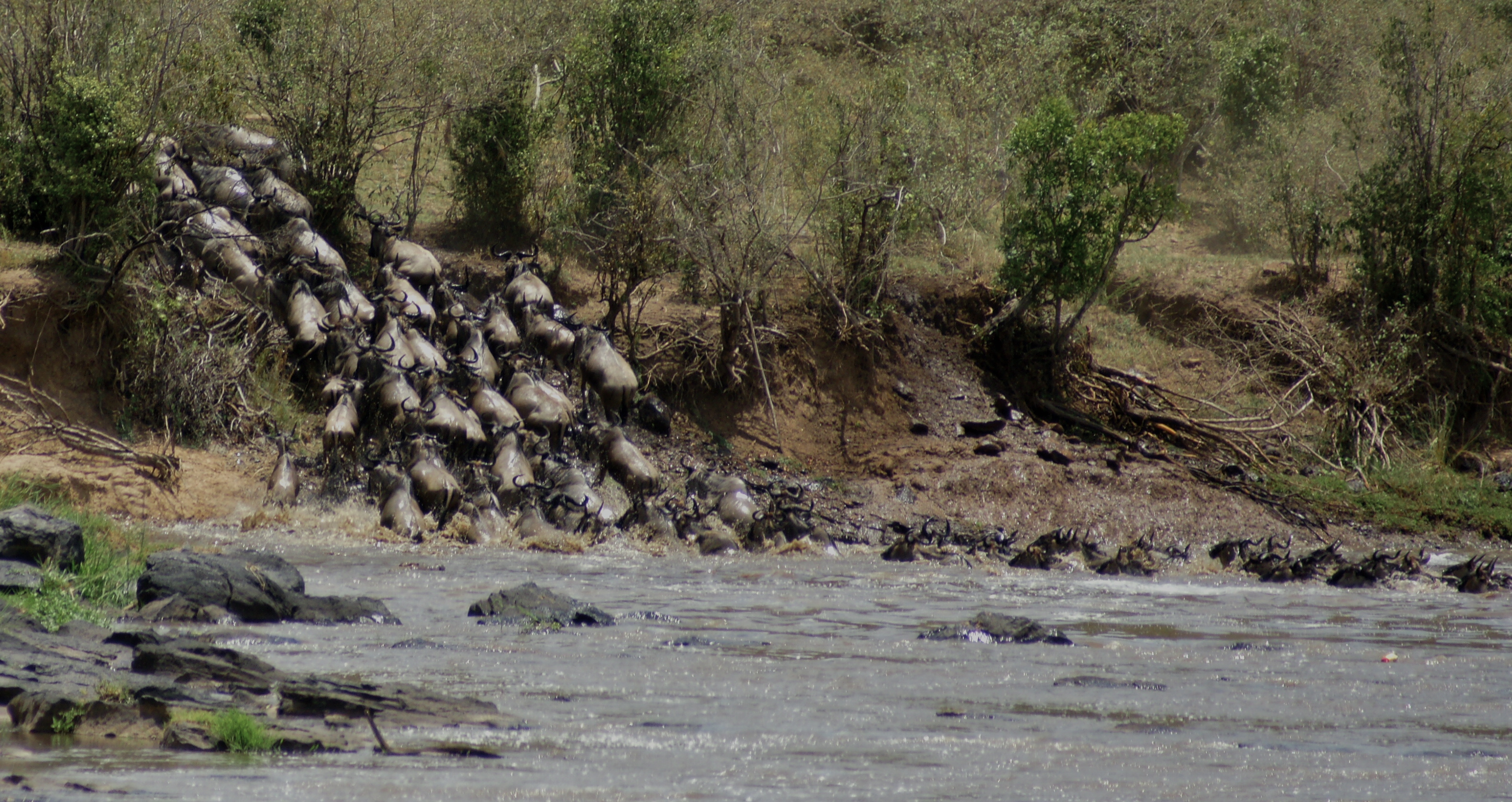
Gnus crossing the Mara River.

- Nile
  - White Nile
    - Victoria Nile (Uganda)
      - Lake Victoria
        - Nzoia River
        - Yala River
        - Nyando River
        - Sondu River (Miriu River)
        - Awach River
          - Itare River
        - Kitare River (South Awach River)
        - Gucha River (Kuja River)
          - Migori River
          - Riana River
          - Mogonga River
        - Mara River

== Lake Turkana ==
- Suguta River
- Kerio River
- Lokichar River (Lomenyangaparat)
- Turkwel River
  - Suam River
  - Omo River
  - Turkwel River

== Lake Baringo ==
- Olarabel River (Ngusero River)
- Molo River
  - Perkerra River
- Njoro River

== Lake Naivasha ==
- Gilgil River
- Malewa River
  - Turasha River (Kija river)

== Lake Natron ==
- Southern Ewaso Ng'iro
  - Seyabei River

== Indian Ocean ==
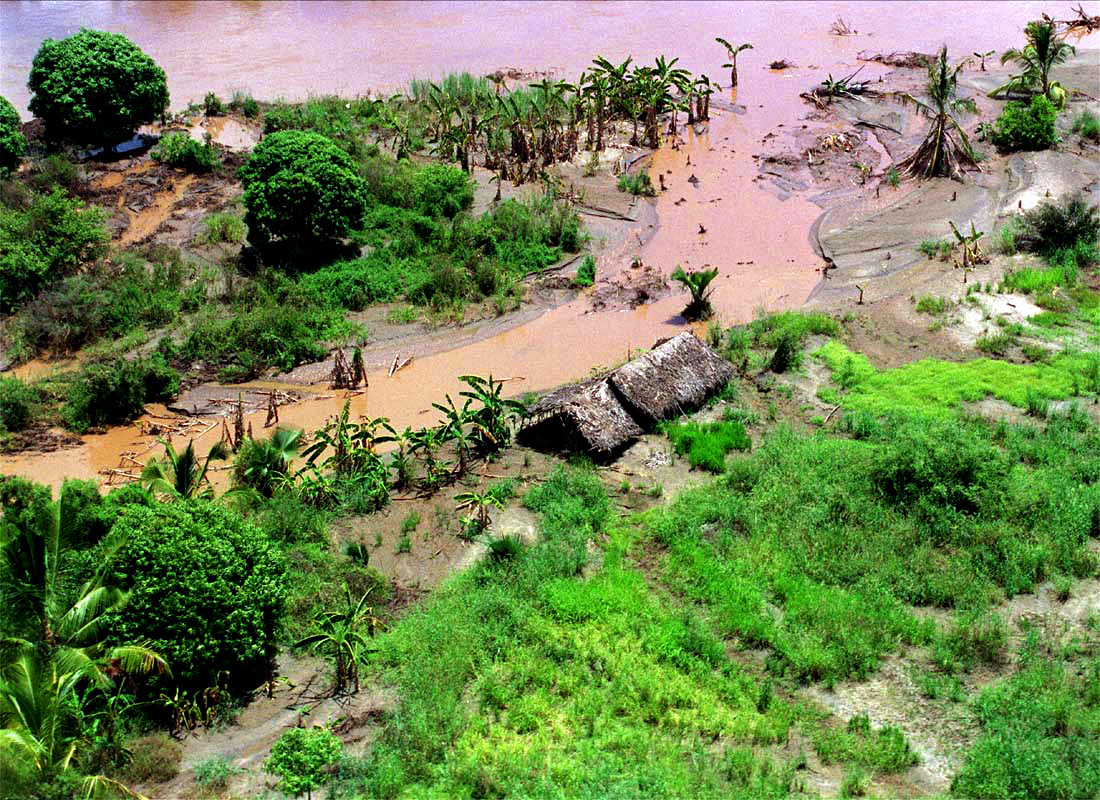
Flooding on the Tanna River, 1998.

- Jubba River (Somalia)
  - Lagh Dera
    - Lak Bor
      - Lagh Kutulo
    - Lagh Bogal
    - Ewaso Ng'iro
      - Isiolo River
      - Naro Moru river
    - Milgis
  - Dawa River
- Tana River
  - Sagana River
  - Kathita River
  - Mutonga River
  - Thiba River
  - Nyamindi River
  - Rupingazi River
  - Kapingazi River
  - Ena River
  - Thuci River
  - Thika River
    - Kiama River
  - Ragati River
  - Kururu River
  - Muhuhi River
- Galana River
  - Athi River
    - Mbagathi River
    - Ruiru River
    - Nairobi River
  - Tsavo River
- Tudor Creek
- Voi River (Goshi River)
- Umba River
- Pangani River (Tanzania)
  - Jipe Ruvu River
    - Lumi River
