= Kinangop Plateau =

Region in Kenya

- Location within Kenya

Highest point
- Elevation: 2,500 m (8,200 ft)
- Coordinates: 0°33′00″S 36°33′18″E

Geography
- Location: Kenya

The Kinangop Plateau is a region in Kenya that lies between the Kenyan Rift Valley to the west and the Aberdare Range to the east. Kinangop is a constituency and sub-county in Nyandarua County, located in central Kenya, northwest of Nairobi and on the Kinangop Plateau between the Aberdare Range and the Great Rift Valley. It is one of the five constituencies that make up Nyandarua County.

== Geographical features ==
The edge of the plateau is about 2,400 metres (7,900 ft) in elevation. The plateau is relatively flat, sloping gradually upwards towards the foothills of the Aberdares. Rainfall is around 1,000 millimetres (39 in) annually, with more rainfall in the north than the south.

Streams that feed the Malewa and Karati rivers have cut into the plateau. These rivers in turn flow into Lake Naivasha.

Soils include ando‐luvic and verto‐luvic phaeozems. At one time the plateau was almost completely covered in tussocky grassland with very few trees. The stream valleys had many tussocky bogs.

== Colonial era ==
After a railway was built, in the 1920s to 1940s the Wanjohi Valley became a British settler community that gained notoriety as the "Happy Valley set". The immigrants bought land at low cost to raise sheep and cattle. Idina Sackville, a member of this set, bought a plot on the side of the Kipipiri Mountain, which rises above the plateau, building a house called "Clouds" that became notorious for parties involving drug use and promiscuous sex. Josslyn Hay, a member of this set, was shot dead in 1941.

During the Mau Mau emergency between 1952 and 1960, huge areas of the "White Highlands" were designated prohibited or restricted to non-Europeans. The Aberdares, Kinangop plateau and Mount Kipipiri were among these. Any African found in the area could legally be shot on sight. Their presence justified "reasonable suspicion" that they were terrorists.

== Today ==
The plateau has been settled by Kikuyu farmers since the 1960s who have ploughed much of the land to grow maize, wheat, cabbage, and potatoes. They have replaced the tussocks with grasses that are easier for livestock to eat, and have planted woodlots across the plateau. The wetlands have mostly been drained. Where drainage has not been deliberate, the trees planted for poles and firewood have absorbed the water. Farm lots are being broken up to be divided between family members. The trend is away from animal husbandry and towards more intensive cultivation of food crops and cash crops.

Mount Kipipiri is a cone-shaped extinct volcano that rises from the plateau in the north. It is part of the Aberdare National Park. The mountain is completely ringed by an electric fence. In June 2009 lengthy negotiations were concluded over the alignment of a wildlife corridor between Kipipiri and the main Aberdare park, with plans to fence the corridor. Grids of rolling bars with gaps between them replace the fence at the points where roads cross the corridor, forming an obstacle that cars can cross but that wildlife will not attempt. This keeps the wildlife, particularly elephants, away from farmers' fields.

== Sources ==
- Birdlife International. "KE004: Kinangop grasslands".
- Darwin Initiative (2006-07-05). "Kinangop Plateau Nature Reserve Management Plan" (PDF). Archived from the original (PDF) on 2012-04-25.
- Hewitt, Peter (2008). Kenya cowboy: a police officer's account of the Mau Mau Emergency. 30° South Publishers. ISBN 978-1-920143-23-7.
- "Kipipiri corridor alignment resolved". RhinoArk. June 29, 2009. Archived from the original on April 26, 2012.
- "SAFARICOM FUNDED GRIDS KEEP JUMBOS AT BAY". RhinoArk. June 24, 2011. Archived from the original on April 26, 2012.
- Osborne, Frances (2010). The Bolter. Random House Digital, Inc. ISBN 978-0-307-47642-5.
