= Turasha River =

Location
- Country: Kenya

Physical characteristics
- Mouth
  - coordinates: 0.50601°S 36.40333°E

The Turasha River is a major tributary of the Malewa River, which feeds Lake Naivasha in the Great Rift Valley of Kenya.

The Turasha rises to the east of Mount Kipipiri. As of 1994 there was a plan for impounding the river for rural water supply, which could threaten Lake Naivasha. It is dammed at an elevation of about 3,000 metres (9,800 ft) to supply fresh water to the town of Nakuru. About 17,500 cubic metres (620,000 cu ft) of water are diverted to Nakuru daily. Of this, about two thirds goes to Nakuru Municipality and one third to Gilgil communities. Below the dam the river falls more or less rapidly until it joins the Malewa.
