= John Methu Muhia =

Kenyan politician

Personal details
- Born: 14 February 1991 (age 35) Kinangop Constituency, Nyandarua County
- Party: United Democratic Alliance
- Education: Pwani University (2017)

John Methu Muhia is a Kenyan politician who serves as the senator for Nyandarua County. He was elected in the 2022 general election on a United Democratic Alliance (UDA) party ticket. Before entering the Senate, he worked in the Nyandarua County Assembly.

== Early life and education ==
Methu Muhia was born on 14 February 1991 in Kinangop Constituency, Nyandarua County, Kenya. He began his primary education at Heni Primary School in 1999 and completed his Kenya Certificate of Primary Education (KCPE) in 2006. In the year 2008, he enrolled at Goshen High School in Nakuru County, where he completed his secondary education and obtained his Kenya Certificate of Secondary Education (KCSE) in 2012.In 2013, he joined Pwani University to pursue a bachelor's degree in political science, graduating in 2017.

== Professional career ==
Methu Muhia began working in public service. In 2018, he was appointed personal secretary to the Speaker of the Nyandarua County Assembly, a position he held until 2022. His responsibilities included supporting the Speaker's office, coordinating legislative activities, liaising with members of the County Assembly and facilitating communication between the Assembly and the public.

== Political career ==
Methu Muhia first contested the Nyandarua County Senate seat in the 2017 general election on a Maendeleo Chap Chap party ticket. He lost the election to the incumbent senator, Mwangi Githiomi.

Ahead of the 2022 general election, Methu Muhia joined the United Democratic Alliance (UDA). On 9 August 2022, he was elected senator for Nyandarua County, defeating incumbent Mwangi Githiomi with 185,337 votes. At the age of 31, he became one of the youngest members elected to the Senate. Following his election, Methu Muhia was appointed chairperson of the Senate Committee on Lands, Environment and Natural Resources. The committee oversees matters relating to land, environmental conservation and natural resource management.

In early 2025, he lost the committee chairmanship amid political realignments within the Senate. Following the change, he stated that he had no regrets and remained committed to representing the people of Nyandarua County.

== Public activities ==
Methu Muhia has raised concerns about public accountability and agricultural services. In March 2025, he questioned the National Cereals and Produce Board (NCPB) over fertilizer distribution, alleging irregularities and the marginalisation of agricultural counties, including Nyandarua.In November 2024, a survey by Politrack ranked him highly in its assessment of senators, reporting an approval rating of 85.2%. The survey's methodology and findings should be cited to the original publication.
