= Mount Kipipiri =

Mountain in Kenya

Kipipiri
- Location within Kenya

Highest point
- Elevation: 3,349 m (10,988 ft)
- Coordinates: 0°26′15″S 36°32′34″E

Geography
- Location: Kenya

Mount Kipipiri is an isolated volcano in the Wanjohi Valley, on the Kinangop Plateau near to the Aberdare Range. It is about 20 miles (32 km) northeast of Lake Naivasha, which is visible from the summit. Wildlife includes Colobus and Sykes monkeys, elephants and buffalo and abundant birdlife. The name of the mountain means "butterfly" in the Gikuyu language, a reference to its profile from a distance.

The Mount Kipipiri Forest Reserve is part of the Aberdare National Park. In 2005 it was estimated that the 43 square kilometres (17 sq mi) forest reserve was home to about 13 elephants. In June 2009 lengthy negotiations were concluded over the alignment of a wildlife corridor between Kipipiri and the main Aberdare park, with plans to fence the corridor. Grids of rolling bars with gaps between them replace the fence at the points where roads cross the corridor, forming an obstacle that cars can cross but that wildlife will not attempt. This keeps the wildlife, particularly elephants, away from farmers' fields.

== Sources ==
- Blanc, J. J. (2007). African elephant status report 2007: an update from the African Elephant Database. IUCN. ISBN 978-2-8317-0970-3.
- "Kipipiri corridor alignment resolved". RhinoArk. June 29, 2009. Archived from the original on 2012-04-26.
- Osborne, Frances (2010). The Bolter. Random House Digital, Inc. ISBN 978-0-307-47642-5.
- "Outdoor Africa: North Kinangop". Nairobi Hotels.
- "SAFARICOM FUNDED GRIDS KEEP JUMBOS AT BAY". RhinoArk. June 24, 2011. Archived from the original on 2012-04-26.
