= Kilifi =

- Town Council
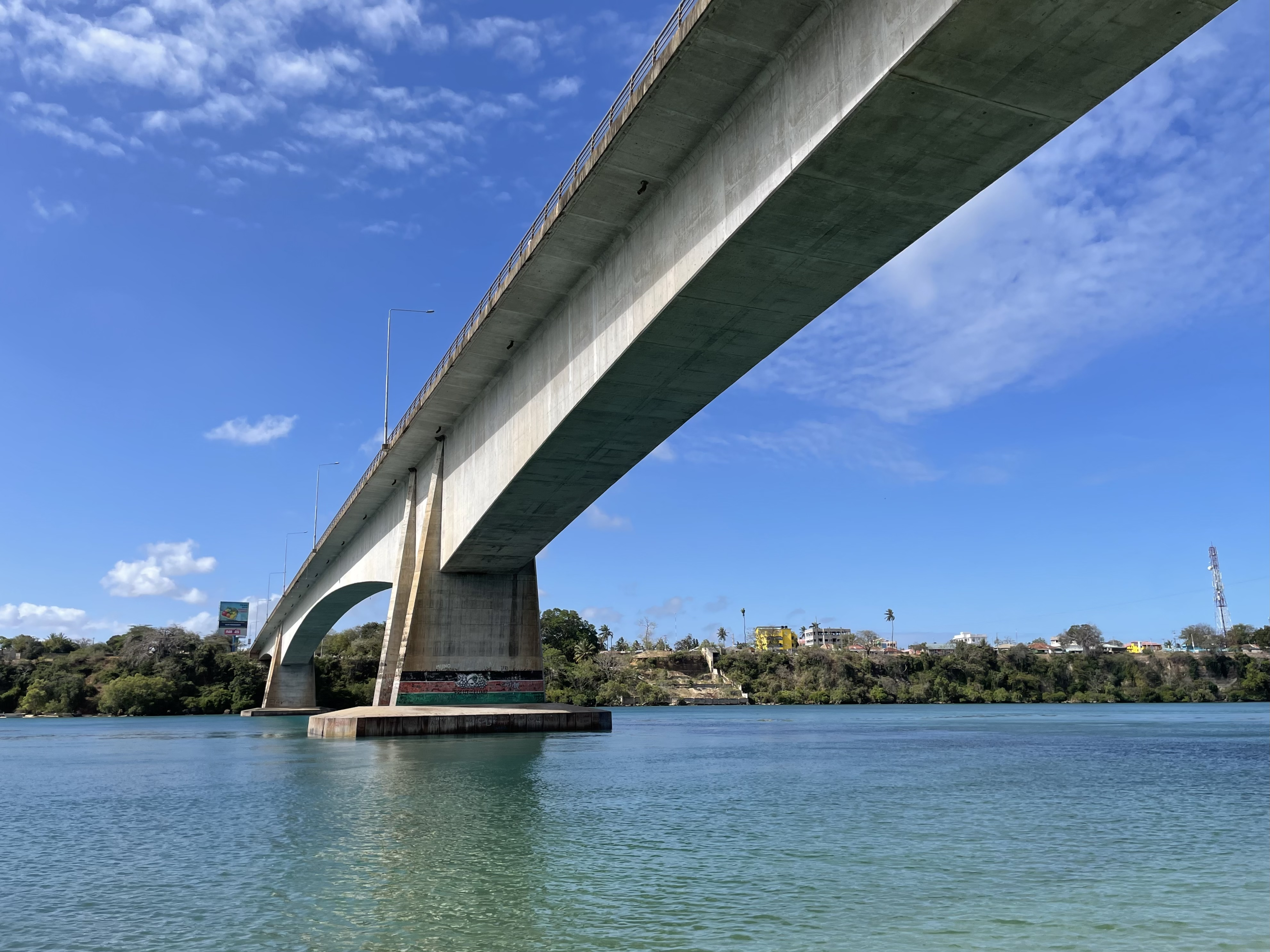
- Kilifi Bridge

- Location within Kenya Location within the Horn of Africa Location within Africa
- Coordinates: 3°38′S 39°51′E
- Country: Kenya
- County: Kilifi County

Population (2009)
  - Total: 122,899
- Time zone: UTC+3 (EAT)

Kilifi is a town on the coast of Kenya, 56 kilometres (35 mi) northeast of Mombasa by road. The town lies on the Kilifi Creek and sits on the estuary of the Goshi River. Kilifi is the capital of Kilifi County and had a population of 122,899 during the 2009 census.

Kilifi is known for its sandy beaches and for the ruins of Mnarani, including mosques and tombs, dating from the 14th to the 17th century.

== Geography and climate ==
Kilifi town sits on both sides of the estuary and is linked by the Kilifi Bridge which overlooks the estuary. The south side has the Mnarani ruins and Shauri Moyo beach while the north side is the main part of Kilifi Town and Bofa Beach.

The weather is generally warm throughout the year (above 25 °C) with two seasons of moderate rainfall (about 800–1000 mm). Long periods of rain start around March and last into July, while the short periods start around October and last until December.

The terrain is generally flat with sandy-loamy soils with the common trees being Cocos nucifera, Anacadium occidentale, Azadirachta indica, and Mangifera indica.

== Demographics ==
Kilifi is a cosmopolitan town with mixed ethnic groups. The predominant inhabitants (about 80%) are from the Mijikenda groups (mainly Giriama and Chonyi). Other groups include the Swahili-Arab descendants, Barawas, Bajunis, Somalis as well as other groups from inland. There is a handful of Indians, and Europeans, mainly British, German and Italian.

== Economy ==
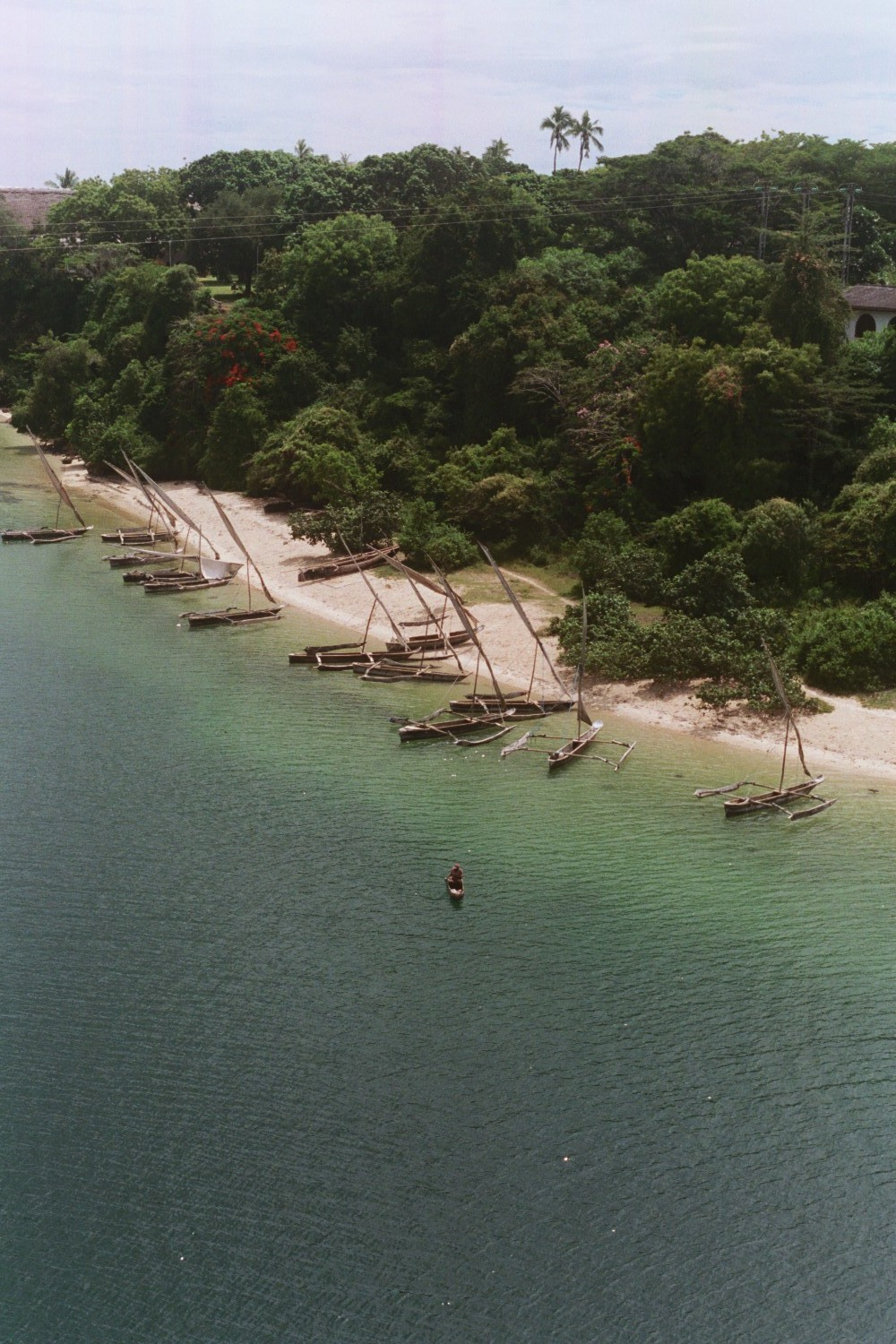
Dhows on Kilifi Creek

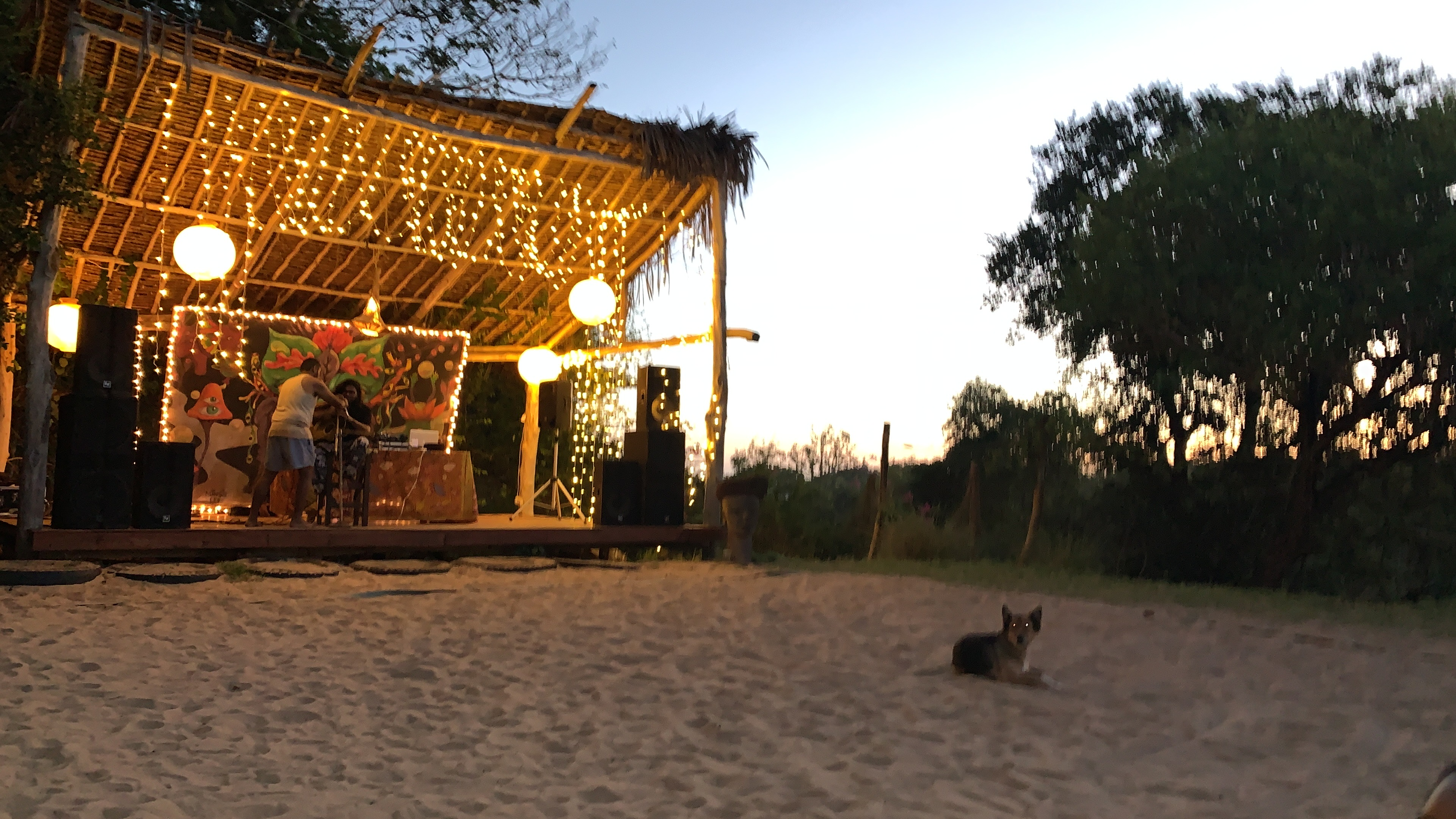
Stage area at Distant Relatives Eco Lodge

Like every coastal town, fishing in Kilifi is one of the historical economic activities. With time, the town has slowly been transforming from a fishing village to basic industrial and service.

The growth of the town was mainly fuelled by the cashew nut milling factory between 1976 and 1990; the district has been a producer of cashews since 1930. The town almost became a ghost town when the factory was closed in 1990 due to a decline in nuts supply, mismanagement of the factory and increased global competition. Other industrial activities include sisal farming at Kilifi Plantations.

Since 2008 with the transformation of the Kilifi Institute of Agriculture into Pwani University there has been substantial expansion of the service sector as a result of this. Banking activity has been growing with about seven banks as well as microfinance institutions. Retail businesses and hotels have historically been significant economic activities.

== Tourism ==
Tourism is an important economic activity in Kilifi, supported by its beaches, historical sites, and cultural heritage. Kilifi has a coastline with several kilometers of sandy beaches, including Bofa Beach, which is noted for its clear waters and white sands. The area offers a less commercialized alternative compared to nearby destinations such as Malindi and Watamu.

Historical landmarks, such as the Mnarani Ruins from the 14th century, contribute to Kilifi's appeal, providing insight into the region's Swahili history. Cultural festivals in Kilifi also highlight the traditions of the local Mijikenda communities, drawing visitors from both within Kenya and abroad.

Tourism in Kilifi contributes to local employment and supports businesses such as hotels, restaurants, and tour operators. Sustainable tourism initiatives are being promoted to preserve the area's natural and cultural resources.

== Health ==
The Kilifi County Hospital, which is also a referral hospital, serves all of Kilifi County and also supports the KEMRI-Wellcome Trust Research Programme, a large medical research centre collaborative between Kenya's KEMRI and the British Wellcome Trust, known for its work on malaria and bacterial and viral childhood infections. Several other private clinics can be found here. The Khairat Medical Centre which was recently opened is equipped with a modern laboratory, x-ray, and scan machines with qualified personnel and is situated in the Mtaani area of Sokoni Sub-Location opposite Masjid Hudaa. Mephi Hospital is also a registered and certified level 4 hospital situated in Mephi Plaza, Prison Road off Mombasa - Malindi highway, offering intensive medical services including dialysis, minor surgeries and radiological services.

== Notable organizations ==
- Pwani University
- KOMAZA
- World Vision
- Plan International
- The Fred Hollows Foundation

== See also ==
- Historic Swahili Settlements
