= Malewa River =

Physical characteristics
- Mouth
  - coordinates: 0.724778°S 36.353288°E
- Basin size: 1,730 km^{2} (670 sq mi)

Basin features
- Tributaries
  - left: Turasha
  - right: Wanjohi

The Malewa River rises in the western slopes of the Aberdare Range in Kenya and flows south and west into Lake Naivasha in the Great Rift Valley. Lake Naivasha is an important source of water in a semi-arid environment, and supports export-oriented horticulture and floriculture businesses as well as tourism. Malewa River water quality has deteriorated because of more human activities in the upper catchment. Long-term effects of this on the percentage of rainfall getting into Lake Naivasha are not clear. Possibly in low-rainfall years the percentage will drop because of water abstraction, while in high-rainfall years the percentage will go up because of cultivated soils having a lower water-holding capacity and the introduction of more 100% runoff surfaces like tarmac roads and iron sheets, etc.

== Catchment ==
The Malewa River catchment of 1,730 square kilometres (670 sq mi) provides about 90% of the water flowing into Lake Naivasha, with most of the remainder coming from the Gilgil River. The headwaters of the main channel of the Malewa originate at an elevation of 3,700 metres (12,100 ft) in the Nyandarua (Aberdare) mountains. Its tributary the Wanjohi is fed by several small rivers running from the slopes of the Aberdares. Other tributaries are the Turasha, Simba, Nyairoko and Ol Kalou. The rivers in the Malewa basin are relatively shallow but are all perennial.

The Aberdare range receives about 1,200 millimetres (47 in) of rain annually and has large areas of dense forest. The highlands drained by the Malewa are volcanic and contribute sodium and calcium to the water through chemical weathering of the rocks. Sulphate in the water comes from the atmosphere. The floor of the Rift Valley gets just 600 millimetres (24 in) each year and is mainly covered by scrub, with some bare soil. Rainfall peaks between April and June and again in October and November. Erosion is highest in these months.

== Land use ==
The Malewa River is fed by streams that run through the Kinangop Plateau. At one time the plateau was almost completely covered in tussocky grassland with very few trees. The stream valleys had many tussocky bogs. The plateau has been settled by Kikuyu farmers since the 1960s. They have ploughed much of the land to grow maize, wheat, cabbage and potatoes. The wetlands have mostly been drained. Where drainage has not been deliberate, the trees planted for poles and firewood have absorbed the water. The trend is towards more intensive cultivation of food crops and cash crops.

== Issues ==
The river is threatened by deforestation and siltation, increasing diversion of water for irrigation, and pollution by fertilizers and pesticides. In August 1997 sediment-laden plumes of Malewa river water extended about 500 metres (1,600 ft) into Lake Naivasha. Access to natural resources and markets is not equitable in the region. Water conflict is common and poverty is widespread. Improvements to resource management practices could cause major improvements in reducing pollution and erosion.

== Sources ==
- Birdlife International. "KE004: Kinangop grasslands".
- Darwin Initiative (2006-07-05). "Kinangop Plateau Nature Reserve Management Plan" (PDF). Archived from the original (PDF) on 2012-04-25.
- Hamududu, Byman, H (1998). "Erosion assessment for large basins using remote sensing and GIS". International Institute for Aerospace Survey and Earth Sciences, Netherlands.
- Gherardi, Francesca (2007). Biological invaders in inland waters: profiles, distribution and threats. Springer. ISBN 978-1-4020-6028-1.
- Harper, David M. (2003). Lake Naivasha, Kenya. Springer. ISBN 1-4020-1236-5.
- "Lake Naivasha - Malewa River Basin Integrated Water Resource Management (IWRM) Programme". WWF Global.
- Ogweno, Luke Philip (2009). "Hydrological analysis of Malewa watershed as a basis for implementing payment for environmental services (PES)". Jomo Kenyatta University of Agriculture and Technology, Kenya.
- Young, T. P. (1996). East African ecosystems and their conservation. Oxford University Press. ISBN 0-19-510817-5.
