= Komaza =

Distributed forestry company in Kenya

Komaza is a distributed forestry company that partners with smallholder farmers in Kenya to plant trees for sale as sustainable wood products. They provide farmers with the support across the entire value chain, from supplying seedlings and other planting inputs to establish tree farms, up to harvesting, processing and selling mature trees to local markets. Komaza has planted nearly 7,000 tree farms and currently employs over 100 full-time staff.

With headquarters in Kilifi town, the company works with thousands of farmers throughout Kilifi County, and is actively expanding into Kwale County. The company has planted over 2 million trees with over 6,000 farmers in Kenya. Komaza has goals to plant 1 billion trees with 1 million farmers across 10+ countries by 2030.

== History ==
Komaza was founded in 2006 by Tevis Howard. Prior to starting Komaza, Howard had been pursuing a career in science from an early age. His high school science project on multiple sclerosis won Third Place in the Intel International Science and Engineering Fair, culminating in being named on the Forbes ASAP list of "Top-10 Teenage All Stars." Howard then spent a gap year in Kenya, conducting malaria research at the KEMRI-Wellcome Trust Research Labs, a prominent medical research facility in Kilifi, Kenya. Howard then began his studies at Brown University, where we graduated with a degree in Neuroscience in 2007.

Howard started Komaza from his dorm room in 2005 while in his third year at college. Motivated by a desire to get rural dryland farmers out of poverty, he researched and developed several preliminary business plans, with trees emerging as the winner. Komaza started by planting a 5-acre demonstration tree farm on the Mombasa-Malindi highway on the outskirts of Kilifi town. After graduating university, Howard immediately returned to Kenya, hired an early team, and began planting with the first farmers in 2008. In that year, Howard was awarded fellowships from the Draper Richards Kaplan Foundation and the Mulago Foundation, two highly-selective social enterprise foundations in California. Howard has since won several awards for his work with Komaza, including the Social Venture Network's Innovation Award in 2010, an Ashoka Fellowship in 2011, and being named on the Forbes 30 Under 30 list in 2014. Howard has dedicated more than a decade to growing the organization to the point of planting 2,000 hectares over this time.

== Micro-Forestry ==
Komaza's model is a combination of microfinance and sustainable forestry. Working through a village-based farmer extension network, Komaza identifies interested farmer groups under the advice and consent of community leadership and then provides them with appropriate agriculture inputs and tools on credit – such as improved seeds and fertilizer, on-farm training and support, and complete vertically integrated value chain services so that they can access markets and transform their previously unproductive land into valuable tree farms. Farmers can then reinvest this profit to start their own business, pay school fees for their children and receive improved healthcare.

Komaza supports farmers through a "Field Extension Network" of full-time field staff. Facilitators work in their villages to support farmers in their community. They are supervised by Field Officers who supervise hundreds of farmers in a location. Finally Field Managers provide training and management support.

== Accomplishments ==
As of 2016, Komaza had partnered with nearly 7,000 farm families to plant more than 2,000,000 trees in Kenya's Kilifi County.
