= Gilgil =

Town in Nakuru County, Kenya

Coordinates: 0°29′56″S 36°19′37″E

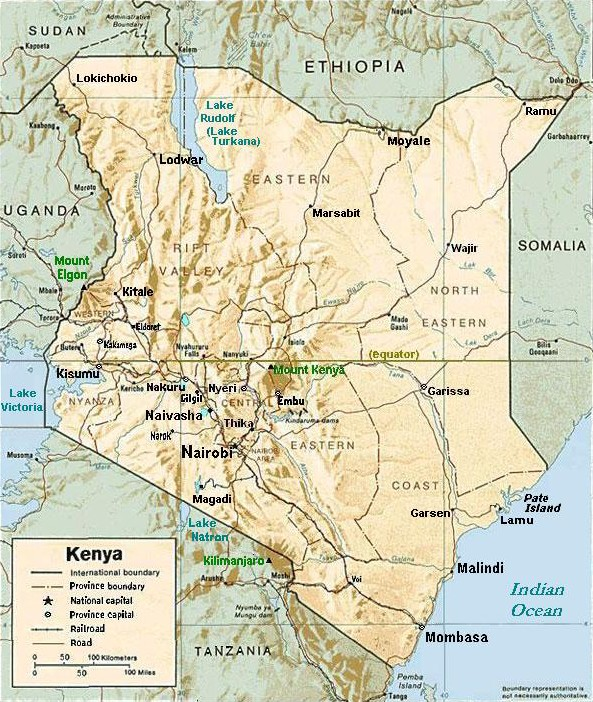
The town of Gilgil, Kenya is north of Nairobi, between Naivasha and Nakuru (click map to enlarge)

Gilgil is a town in Nakuru County, Kenya. The town is located between Naivasha and Nakuru and along the Nairobi - Nakuru highway. It is to the west of the Gilgil River, which flows south to feed Lake Naivasha.

According to the 1999 census, Gilgil had a population of 18,805.

Gilgil is the administrative centre of Gilgil Division in Nakuru County. In 2022, Gilgil town received a charter from former Governor Lee Kinyanjui to become a municipality.

== History ==
During the 1920s to 1940s, some members of the Happy Valley set lived in Gilgil. From 1944 to 1948, it also contained a British internment camp for Irgun and Lehi members. The first soldiers that arrived in the town were advance parties of the South African Army preparing for the arrival of the 1st South African Infantry Brigade, which was training in the area by mid-1940. Gilgil was made the brigade headquarters.

In July 1958 Gilgil G1 Camp was occupied by the 1st Battalion, the King's Own Royal Regiment, first to take up accommodation at the camp since the end of the Second World War. In July 1959 2nd Battalion, Coldstream Guards replaced them. Works services costing £75,000 were begun in two phases, £50,000 in December 1958, and £25,000 in August 1959. These charges were borne by the UK (British) Army vote. As of December 1959, the battalion at Gilgil was to move to Kahawa when the new buildings there were ready.

In the 1950s and 1960s, Gilgil was used as a base for the rotation of British infantry units who, typically, would progress from the United Kingdom to the British Army of the Rhine (BAOR) in Germany, to Kenya (with detachments left en route in the nascent Gulf states) and then on to Hong Kong.

The 3rd Regiment Royal Horse Artillery was located at Alanbrooke Barracks, Gilgil, from September 1961 to September 1964. After the handover to Kenya the barracks was rechristened Kenyatta Barracks.

== Economy ==
Agriculture is the main local industry. While Gilgil Telecommunications Industries was a notable employer, it is now closed down as it was sold by the government. There are a few industries within the outskirts of the town, namely the Gilgil Diatomite Industries which is located further to the west along the Gilgil-Nakuru main road. The industry mines diatomite which is used for various industrial purposes. The other industry is the Ndume Farm Machineries, which manufactures farm equipment, especially maize milling machines and ploughs.

The towns population has grown considerably since 2007 as many of the internally displaced people fleeing post-election violence after the 2007 presidential election opted to settle in GilGil and Naivasha. These populations have significantly expanded the farming activities in the towns outskirts.

The community also hosts two large Kenya Defence Forces (KDF) barracks, the headquarters of Kenya Police Service's Anti-Stock Theft Unit (4 kilometres northwest of the town centre) and the National Youth Service training college (to the west of the town). The larger numbers of personnel employed by these organizations contribute a lot to the town's economy. Much of the town's real estate has expanded thanks to military personnel who are routinely engaged in overseas peace-keeping missions, with the resulting monetary benefits being invested in property, both residential and commercial.

The National Youth Service (NYS) is run as a military-style operation and provides a 3-6 month basic training for the youth who must undergo a two-year national service before they are provided with a tuition-free training in most engineering technical fields. The Anti-Stock-Theft unit (ASTU), a paramilitary outfit, is a rapid response police unit to track down cattle rustlers mainly among the pastoral communities.

=== Tourism ===
Tourism is also a small-scale contributor to the town's economy. Nearby destinations include Lake Elementaita, northwest along the Nairobi-Nakuru highway, which serves as a bird sanctuary and has a number of hotels and lodges.

The Kariandusi Prehistoric Site lies next to the Kariandusi Diatomite Plant. The site is operated by the National Museums of Kenya, and an important Lower Paleolithic site. There is enough geological evidence to show that in the past, large lakes, sometimes reaching levels hundreds of meters higher than the present Lake Nakuru and Elementaita, occupied this basin. Dating back between 700,000 and one million years old, Kariandusi is possibly the first Acheulian site to have been found in Situ in East Africa.

Dr Leakey, a paleontologist, believed that this was a factory site of the Acheulian period. He made this conclusion after numerous collections of specimens were found lying in the Kariandusi riverbed. This living site of the hand-axe man, was discovered in 1928. A rise in the Lake level drove prehistoric men from their lakeside home and buried all the tools and weapons which they left behind in a hurry. The Acheulian stage of the great hand-axe culture, to which this site belongs, is found over a very widespread area from England, France, and southwest Europe generally to Cape Town.

=== Military ===
The main employer in the town remains the Ministry of Defense as the town hosts two major barracks, the Gilgil barracks (located about 1 km from the Gilgil town center on the old Gilgil - Nakuru road) and the Kenyatta Barracks (located about 2 km along the main Gilgil-Nyahururu road). The latter barracks is also known as Westcom or Western Command. The Gilgil barracks is home to the 5th Kenya Rifles (Kenya Army Infantry) also known as "the fighting five", while the Kenyatta Barracks is home to Kenya's only airborne battalion, the 20th Battalion and also home to the 66 Artillery brigade, the 76 Armoured Recce Battalion and the 1st Mortar Battalion. Most of the townsfolk thus largely rely on the military community in economic terms. In the recent past, members of the military both active and retired personnel have invested significantly in the town's property market and also in retail business.

== Statistics ==
- Elevation = 1,981 metres (6,497 ft approx.) above average sea level - measurement at Gilgil Train Station.
- Population = 21,081

== See also ==
- Railway stations in Kenya
- Nyeri, Kenya - another town from colonial times.
- Alice de Janzé - lived in Gilgil until 1941.
