= Nyando River =

River in western Kenya

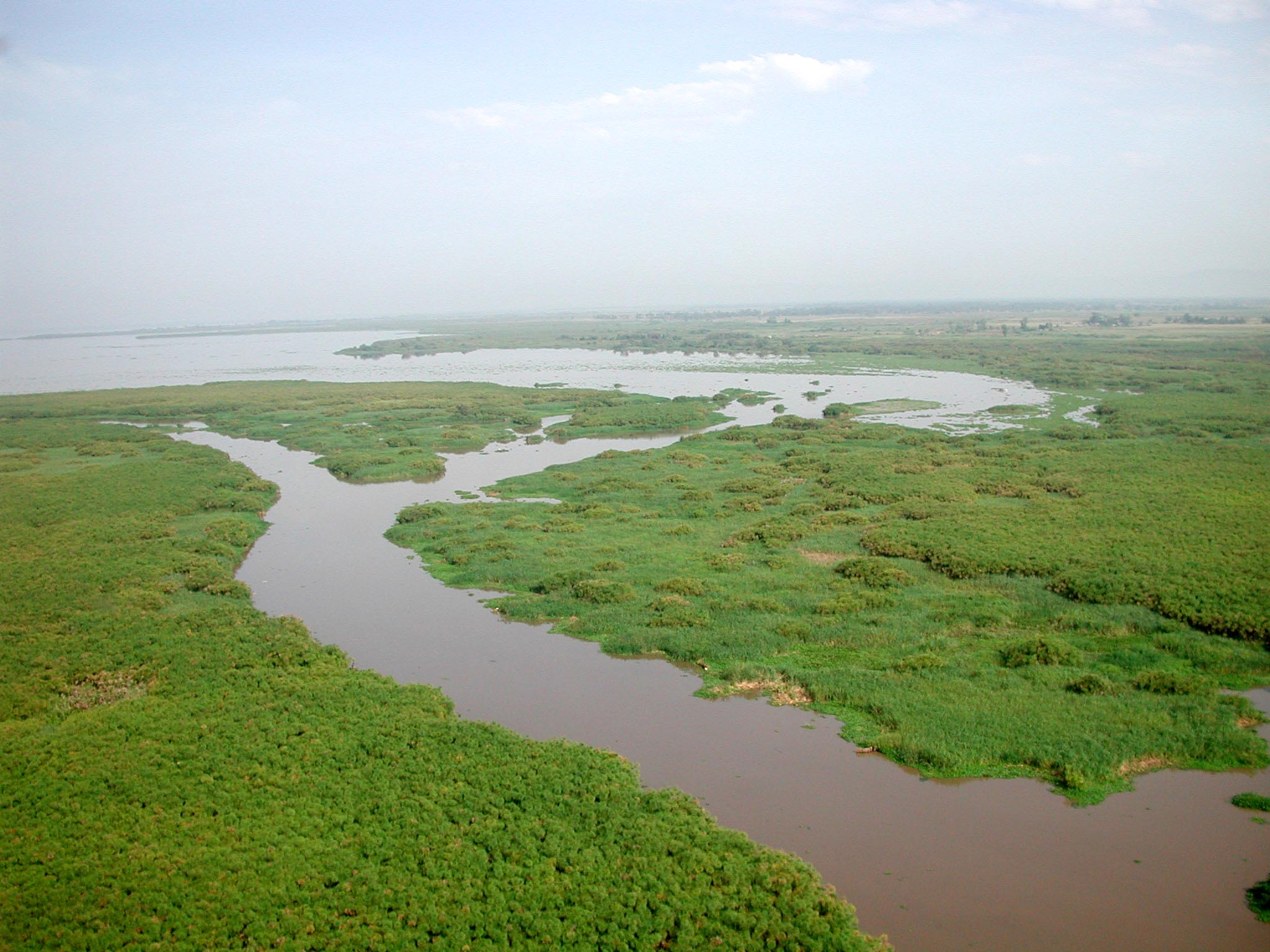
- The mouth of the Nyando River as it flows into Lake Victoria.

- Location of the Nyando River mouth in Kenya

Location
- Country: Kenya

Physical characteristics
- Source
  - location: Mau Escarpment and Nandi Hills
- Mouth
  - location: Winam Gulf, Lake Victoria
  - coordinates: 0°16′54″S 34°51′03″E
  - elevation: 1,134 m
- Length: ~153 km
- Basin size: ~3,600 km2

Basin features
- Tributaries
  - left: Asawo River
  - right: Awach River

Nyando River is in western Kenya, flowing through the counties of Kericho, Nandi, and Kisumu before draining into Lake Victoria. The river and its basin play a significant role in the hydrology, economy, and ecology of the Lake Victoria Basin. The river is approximately 153 kilometers.

== Geography and course ==
Nyando River originates from the highlands of Tinderet Forest in the Nandi Hills and the regiuons of the Mau Escarpment areas in the Rift Valley. It flows westward through Kericho County and Muhoroni towards Kisumu County's Nyando Plains, navigating near Ahero in Kano Plains before emptying into Winam Gulf a northeastern extension of Lake Victoria. The major tributaries are the Asawo River, Awachi River, Paragusi River, Kipchorian and Ombei rivers.

== Basin and hydrology ==
The Nyando River Basin is estimated to be 3,600 square kilometers in area, with elevations ranging from around 2,700 meters in the upper basin to 1,100 meters near the lake. The basin has a bimodal rainfall pattern, which contributes to recurrent flooding in the lower plains during both long rains (March–May) and short rains (October–December).

== Flooding and environmental issues ==
Flooding along the Nyando River is a recurring issue, particularly in the flats of Kano Plains, Ahero, Kadibo, and Nyando regions. In 1961 there were devastating flood events that followed the 1997 - 1998 El Niño and in 2020 the Lake Victoria backflow flooded villages in Ahero and West Kano. Heavy rainfall and upstream deforestation cause siltation, reduced drainage capacity, and community displacement. To alleviate these impacts, government agencies and non-governmental organizations (NGOs) are implementing a variety of flood control and watershed management projects.

== Ecology ==
Wetlands, papyrus swamps, and floodplain grasslands are among the habitats that thrive in the lower Nyando basin. These ecosystems are critical for fish reproduction, bird populations, and water filtration in Lake Victoria. However, agricultural development, sedimentation, and pollution from urban and farm runoff endanger environmental health.

== Economy and land use ==
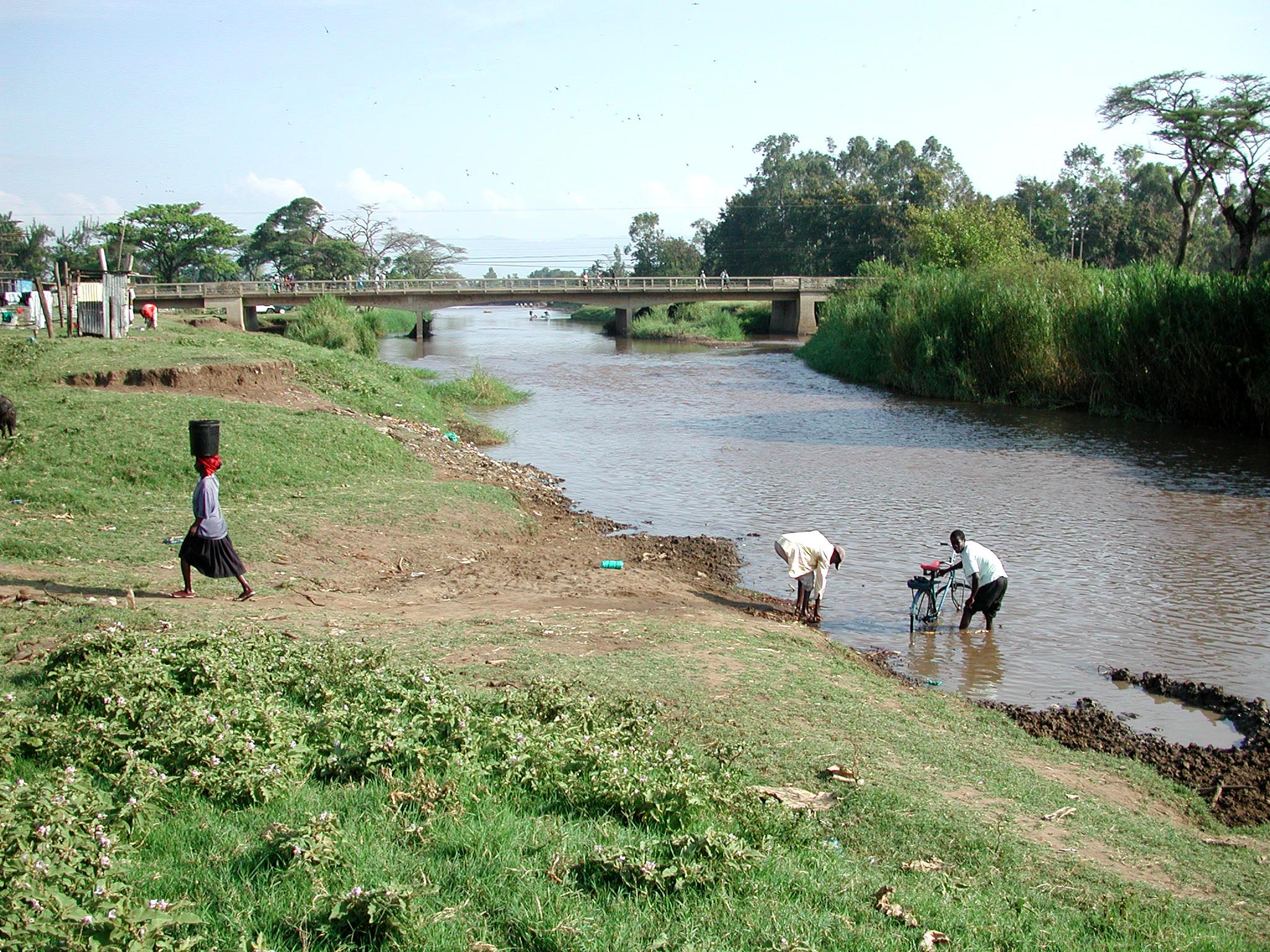
Local residents utilizing the Nyando River near the Ahero crossing.

Due to the clay vertisols, which are difficult to drain and highly suitable for rice cultivation, the river serves irrigation facilities, including the Ahero Irrigation Scheme, which is operated by the National Irrigation Authority and produces rice, maize, and vegetables. Communities in the basin rely on the river for fishing, domestic water, and small-scale agricultural. In recent years, there has been a push to encourage sustainable land management and reforestation in higher catchments. The riverbeds are extensively mined for sand used in the construction industry within the region.

== See also ==
- Lake Victoria
- List of rivers of Kenya
- Ahero Irrigation Scheme
