= Mnarani ruins =

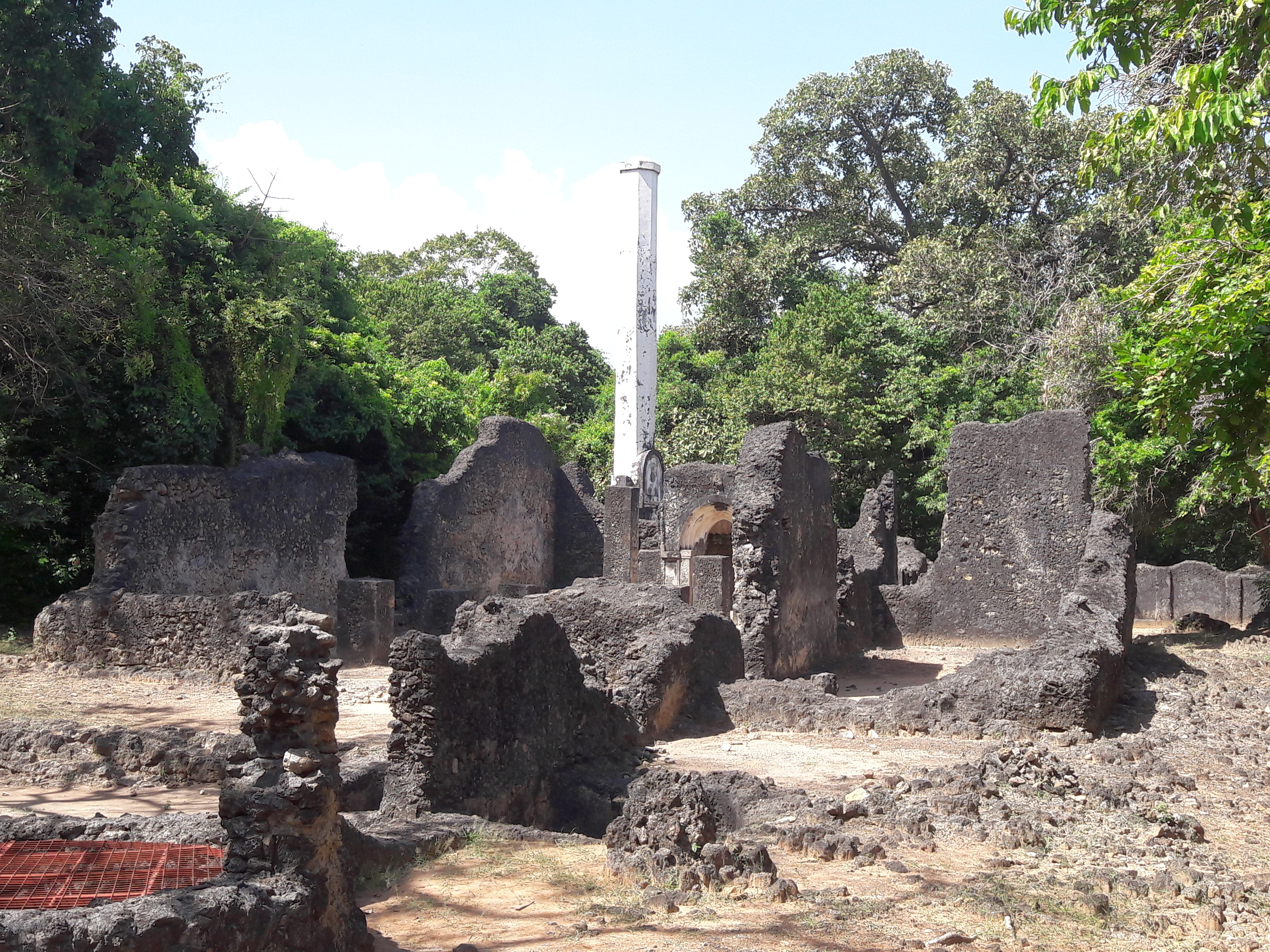
- View of the Mnarani ruins

- Location of the Mnarani ruins
- 3°38′21.39″S 39°50′37.27″E
- Location: Kilifi County, Kenya

The Mnarani ruins are the remains of two mosques near Mnarani in Kilifi County, Kenya, dating from the 15th century.

== Description ==
The remains of the two mosques are located on a bluff overlooking Kilifi Creek from the southern side. The settlement at the site dates back to the 14th century, and the site also contains a number of tombs. People left this settlement in the early 17th century, supposedly due to a lack of fresh water and raids by neighbors.

Access to the Mnarani ruins is subject to an entry ticket.

== Image gallery ==
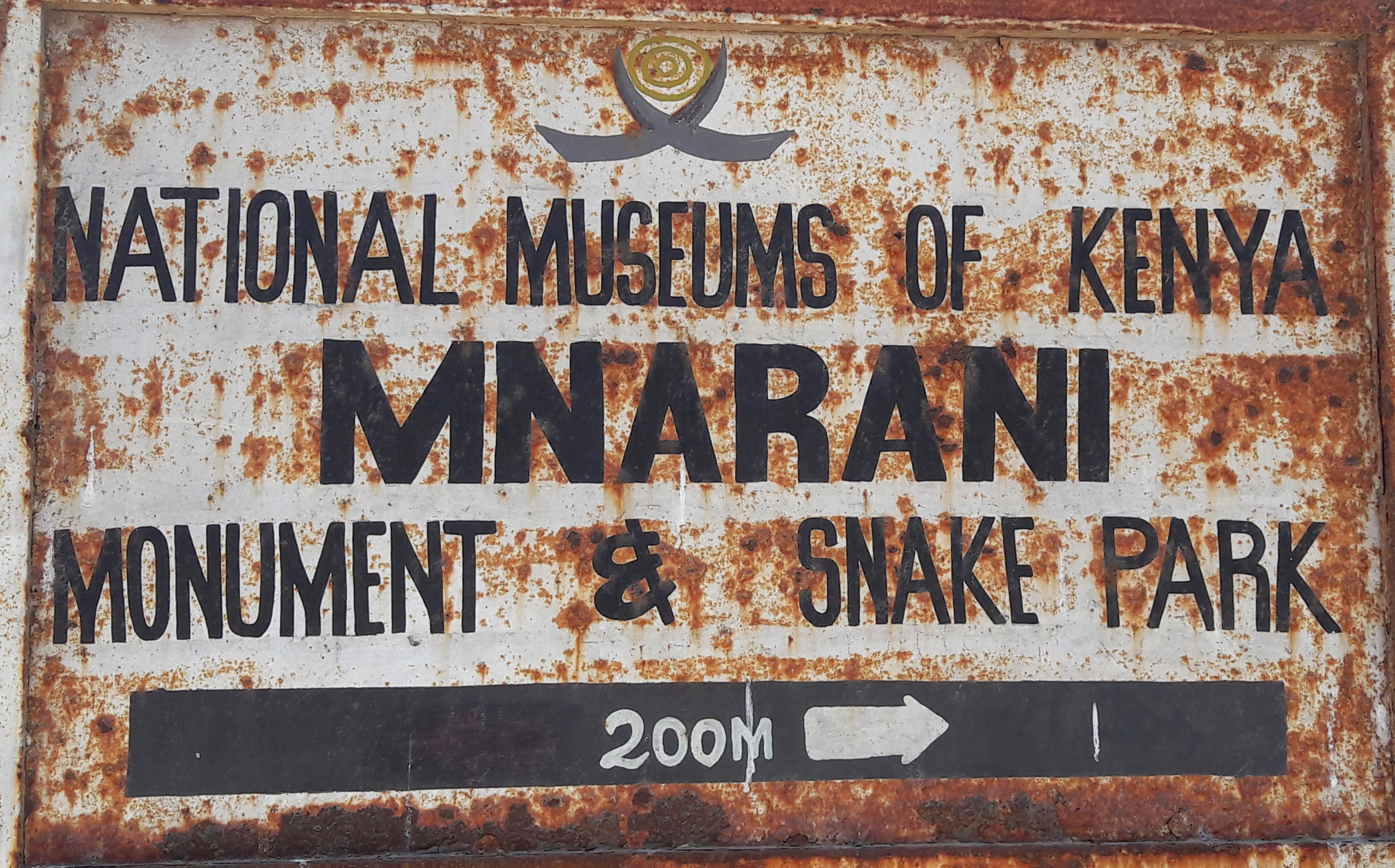
Signpost to the Mnarani ruins

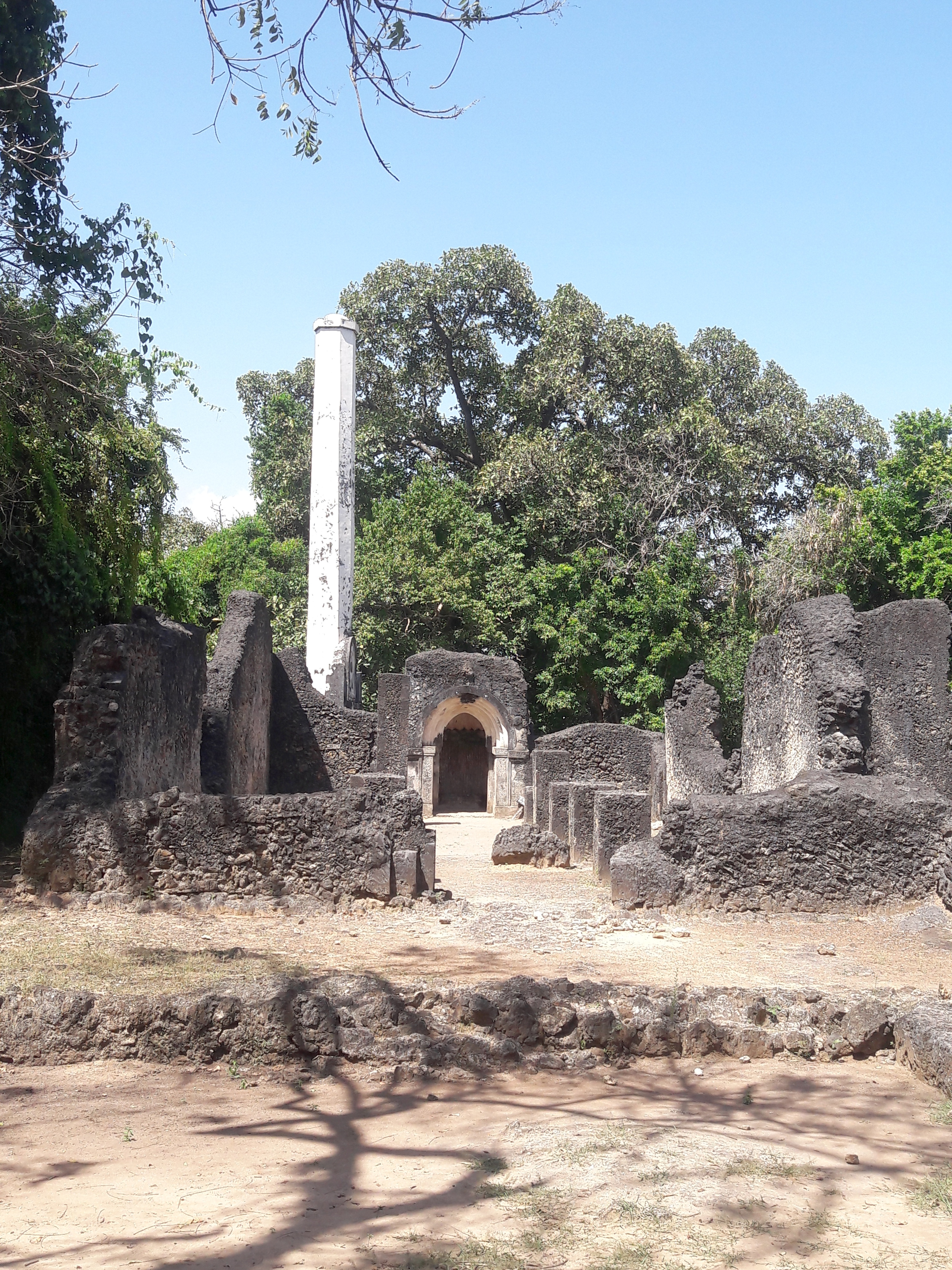
The Great Mosque at Mnarani ruins

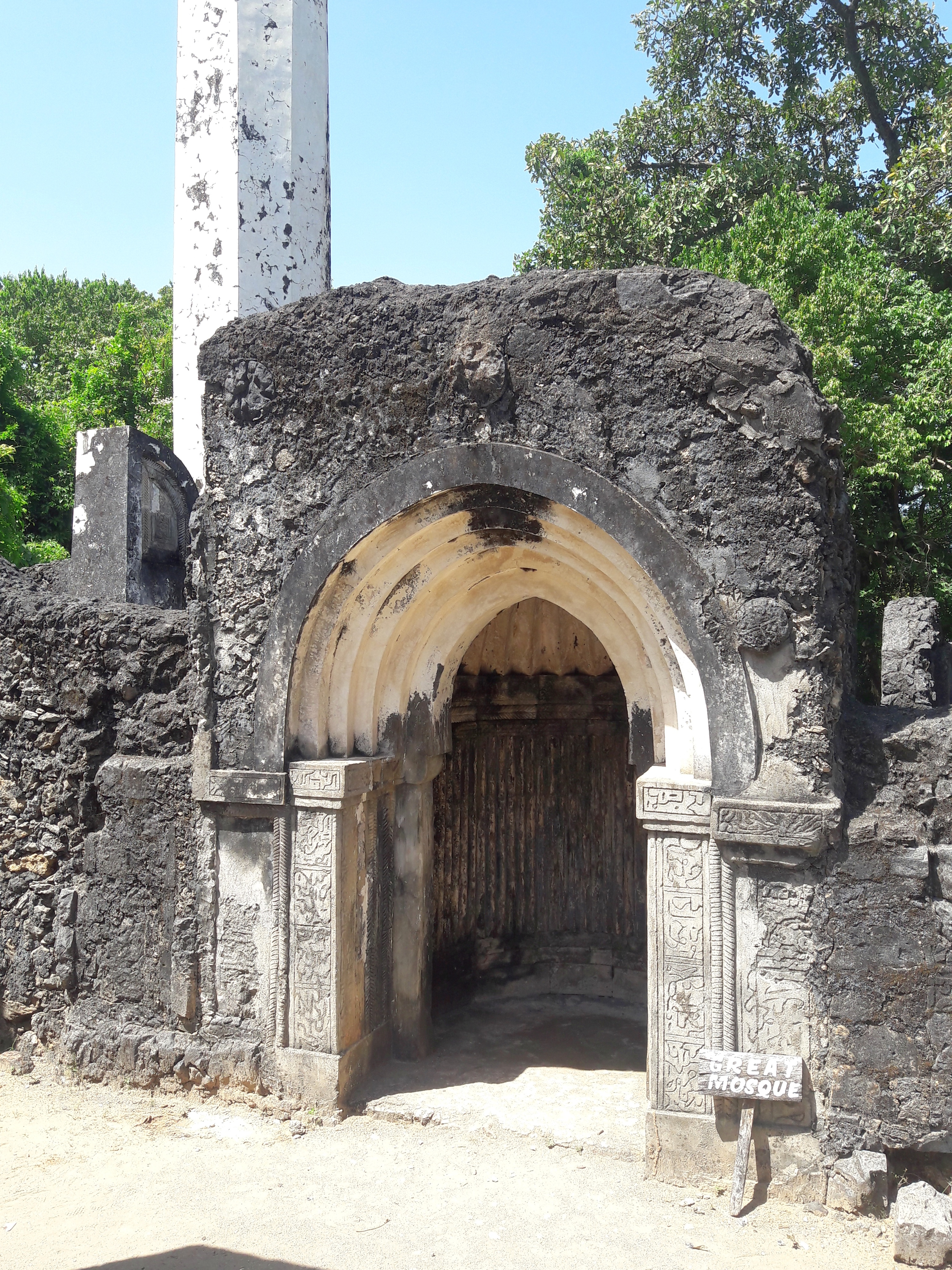
The Mihrab of the Great Mosque at Mnarani ruins

== In popular culture ==
The ruins of Mnarani are described in the second part of Andrei Gusev's novel “Невозвращенец” (“The Non-Returnee”).

== See also ==
- Jumba la Mtwana
- Ruins of Gedi
