= Mnarani =

- Location within Kenya
- Coordinates: 3.64178°S 39.84731°E
- Country: Kenya
- Province: Kilifi County
- Time zone: UTC+3 (EAT)

Mnarani is a settlement in Kenya's Kilifi County in the former Coast Province. It is located on the Kilifi Creek and just south of Kilifi town, which can be reached by crossing the Kilifi Bridge. Mnarani is one of the seven county assembly wards in Kilifi North sub-county.

The Mnarani ruins are located in Mnarani and they consist of two old mosques (the oldest built in 1425) and several tombs. There is also a landing ground for fishers in Mnarani. And along the coast beach resorts can be found.

== See also ==
- Historic Swahili Settlements
