= Gilgil River =

Location
- Country: Kenya

Physical characteristics
- Mouth
  - coordinates: 0.714951°S 36.335993°E

The Gilgil River drains part of the floor of the Great Rift Valley, Kenya and the plateau to the east of the valley, flowing from the north into Lake Naivasha. The river runs to the east of the town of Gilgil, which is on the height of land between the Lake Naivasha and Lake Elmenteita basins.

The river has its origins above 2,500 metres (8,200 ft), where rainfall is around 1,100 millimetres (43 in) annually. It has water year round. The Gilgil has three main headwaters. The Morindati rises at 2,700 metres (8,900 ft), the Kiriundu at 2,710 metres (8,890 ft) and the Little Gilgil at 2,400 metres (7,900 ft). The maximum horizontal channel length is 60 kilometres (37 mi) and maximum drop is 873 metres (2,864 ft).

Just north of the lake, the river opens into a broad floodplain, through which channels have been dug to support irrigated farming. The river's inlet to Lake Naivasha is cloaked with Papyrus, other sedges and Typha. The Gilgil and the much larger Malewa are the main sources of water for Lake Naivasha. Both carry large amounts of sediment into the lake in the rainy seasons. One proposed solution had been to plant hedgerows of Vetiver grass across the delta area, which has been shown in other areas to be effective in trapping silt and also helps wetlands regenerate.

The geologist J.W. Gregory discovered an old settlement on the Gilgil River with obsidian stone flake tools and rough pottery, predating the Iron Age. Tools included skin scrapers, borers and small knives.

== Sources ==
- Gregory, John Walter (1896). The Great Rift Valley... J. Murray. ISBN 9780714618128.
- Harper, David M. (2003). Lake Naivasha, Kenya. Springer. ISBN 1-4020-1236-5.
- "Lake Naivasha". Birdlife International.
- Vetiver Network International (2009). "Lake Naivasha: A Lake in Trouble - A Possible Solution?" (PDF).
