= Kilifi Bridge =

Coordinates: 3°38′11″S 39°50′53″E

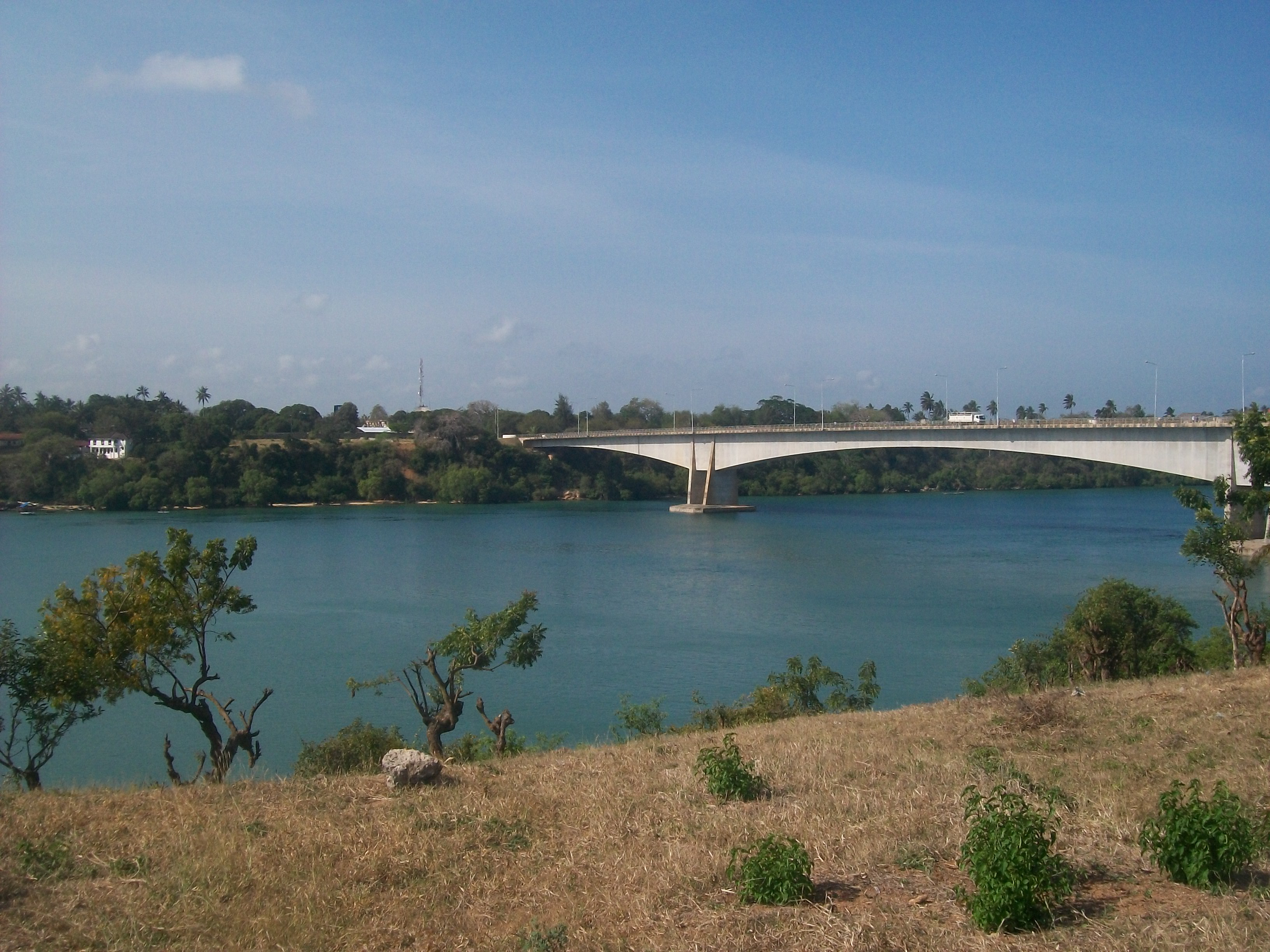

Kilifi Bridge is the longest bridge in Kenya, with a total length of 420 metres. The superstructure is a prestressed continuous box girder carrying two lanes. The bridge has three spans. The construction of Kilifi Bridge was completed in 1991.

It connects Kilifi and Mnarani over the Kilifi Creek. The road heads to Mombasa towards south, and Malindi, Lamu and Garissa towards north.

== Cost ==
700 million KSh adjusted for inflation.
