= Pwani University =

University in Kenya

Coordinates: 03°36′59″S 39°50′38″E

- Motto: Empowerment for Sustainable Development [Shajiisho la Maendeleo Endelevu]
- Type: Public
- Established: 23 August 2007
- Chairman: Prof. Mohamed Salim Badamana
- Vice-Chancellor: Professor James H.P Kahindi, PhD
- Students: 8,000
- Location: Kilifi, Kilifi County, Kenya
- Campus: Main Campus Kilifi
- Colours: Blue
- Website: https://www.pu.ac.ke/

Pwani University is a public university in the Kilifi County in the coastal region of Kenya, located 60 km north of Mombasa in the resort town of Kilifi, within the larger Kilifi County. Prior to the award of a charter, the university was a constituent college of Kenyatta University.

== History ==
The college, formerly the Kilifi Institute of Agriculture, was established on 23 August 2007 by an order signed by His Excellency President Mwai Kibaki.

== Location ==
Pwani University is located along Mombasa-Malindi highway. It occupies approximately 239 hectares of land, giving room for future expansion. The first group of around 200 students was registered on 20 October 2007, mainly in the field of Education (Science) and Education (Arts).

== Schools ==
- School of Education
- School of Humanities and Social Sciences
- School of Business and Economics
- school of Pure and Applied Sciences (SPAS)
- School of Agricultural Sciences and Agribusiness Studies
- School of Environmental and Earth Sciences
- School of Graduate Studies (SGS)
- School of Health and Human Sciences

== Research ==
Pwani University has signed MOUs, touching on diverse areas of interest as a way of enhancing beneficial interactions. The University has collaboration with research institutions in Kenya and around the world. These include:

- Kenya Agricultural Research Institution,
- Kenya Medical Research Institute,
- National Council for Science and Technology,
- Florida State University,
- Technische Universitat Dortmund
- University of East Anglia,
- The John Innes Centre in the UK,
- The University of Glasgow,
- International Livestock Research Institute
- Kenya Plant Health Inspectorate Service.
- University of Eldoret
- Sun Yet Sen University

In collaboration with the National Council for Science and Technology, the university convened a stakeholders forum to address the problem of poor performance in sciences subjects at KSCE examinations and low conversion rates from primary to secondary and University level in Coastal Kenya.

To reach more people with the message of development in the region, the university has been participating in the Mombasa International Agricultural Show since 2008. In this trade fair, the university displays scientific research findings and applied technologies which can be used by farmers to address challenges in agricultural productivity, food insecurity and agribusiness.

== Special programmes ==
The coastal region like most other parts of the country has a challenge on HIV/AIDS and alcohol and drug abuse. Majority of the students at the university are the youth, an age at risk of contracting HIV or falling in the trap of drug abusers. Aware of this risk, the university has put up an AIDS control unit (ACU) which coordinates programs and activities to fight the challenges of HIV/AIDS. The ACU is supported by a committee which addresses the challenges of alcohol and drug abuse within the University. The ACU trains Peer Educators/counselors drawn from students and distributed in the halls of residence and programs of study. They identify emerging cases and offer support before referring the cases to professional counselors. Every semester the ACU arranges for HIV/AIDS weeks to provide counseling and testing services. The Department of Biological sciences is training students on soft presentation skills to help students in their final year research projects as part of the curriculum. This training is fully student peer-learning and is a collaboration between the Pwani University and The John Innes Centre.
