= Voi River =

River in Kenya

Coordinates: 03°37′55″S 039°48′51″E

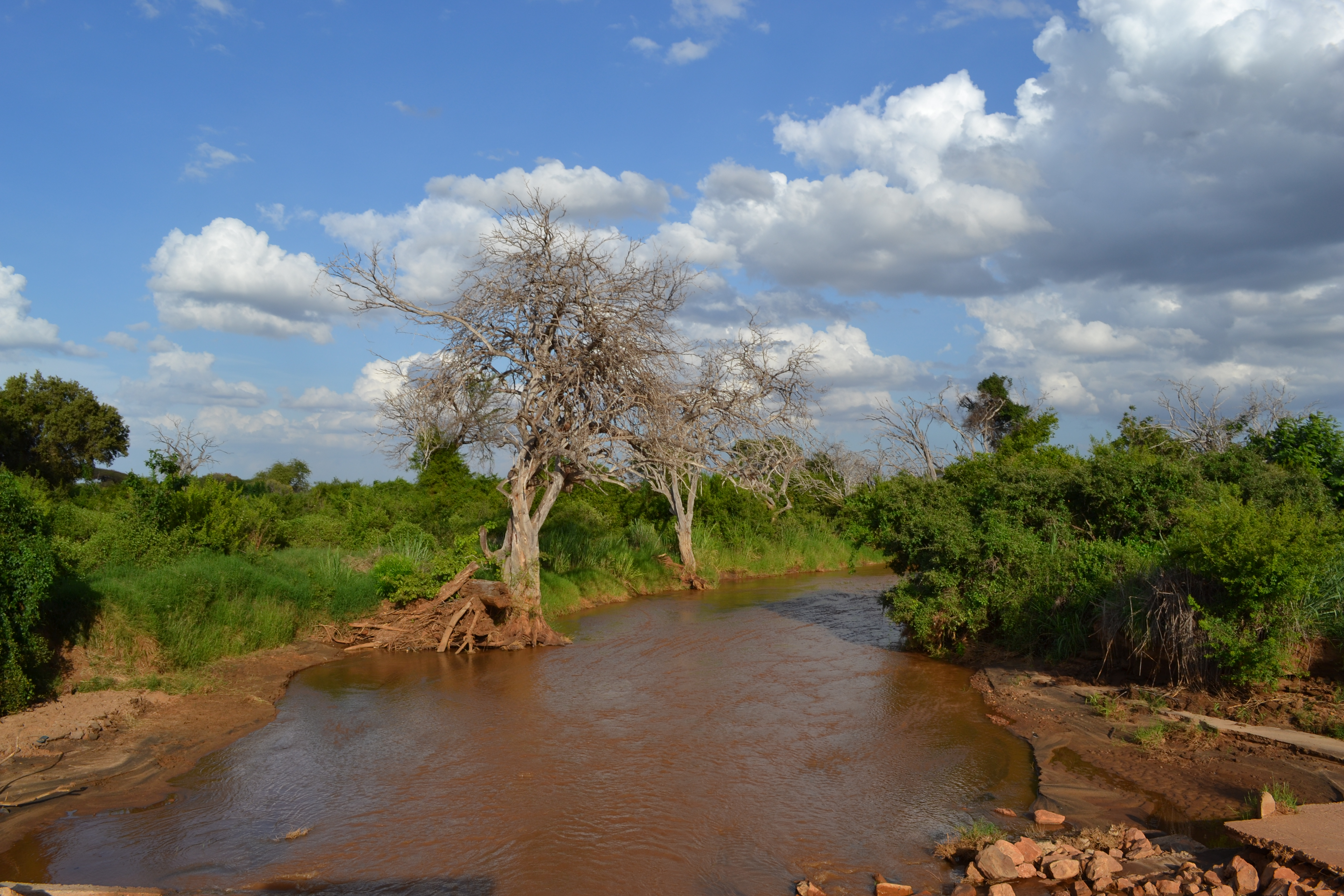
The Voi River in the Tsavo East National Park

The Voi River (Goshi River) is a river in Coast Province, Kenya, East Africa. It originates in the Taita Hills and flows past the town of Voi and through the Tsavo East National Park before emptying into the sea at Kilifi. Its total length is about 210 kilometres (130 mi). However, in the dry season only the last (lower) eighty kilometres have water in it.

== Aruba Dam ==
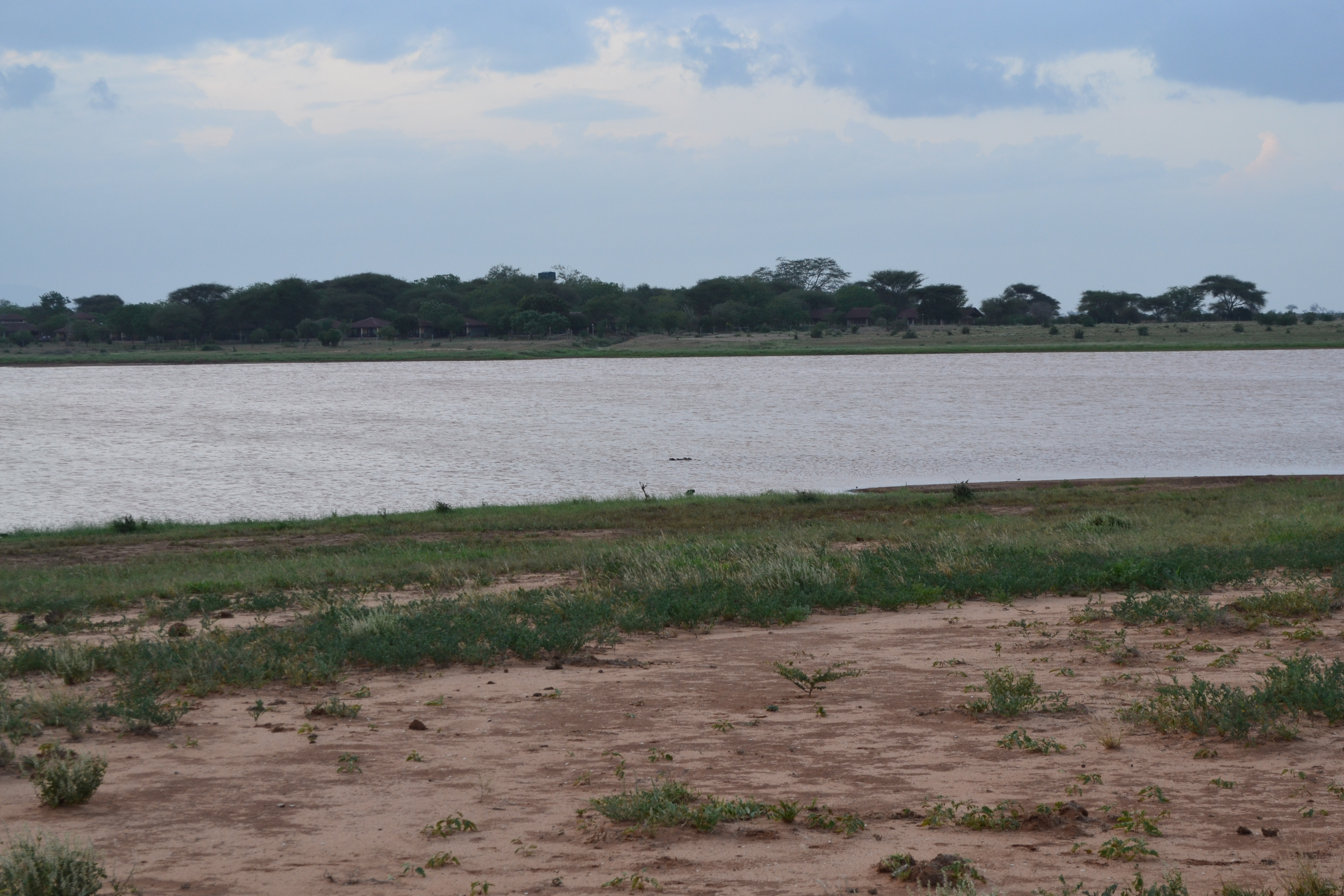
The reservoir of the Aruba Dam

Aruba Dam was built in 1952 across the Voi River. The reservoir created by the dam attracts many animals and water birds.

== Mouth ==
At the mouth of the Voi, the river flows into the Goshi Estuary. The Goshi Estuary flows into a narrow neck where there is a bridge between the Shauri Moyo beach and Kilifi. The neck is known as Kilifi Creek and is about 3 kilometres (1.86 mi) long between the estuary and the sea.
