= Lake Naivasha =

Freshwater lake in Kenya

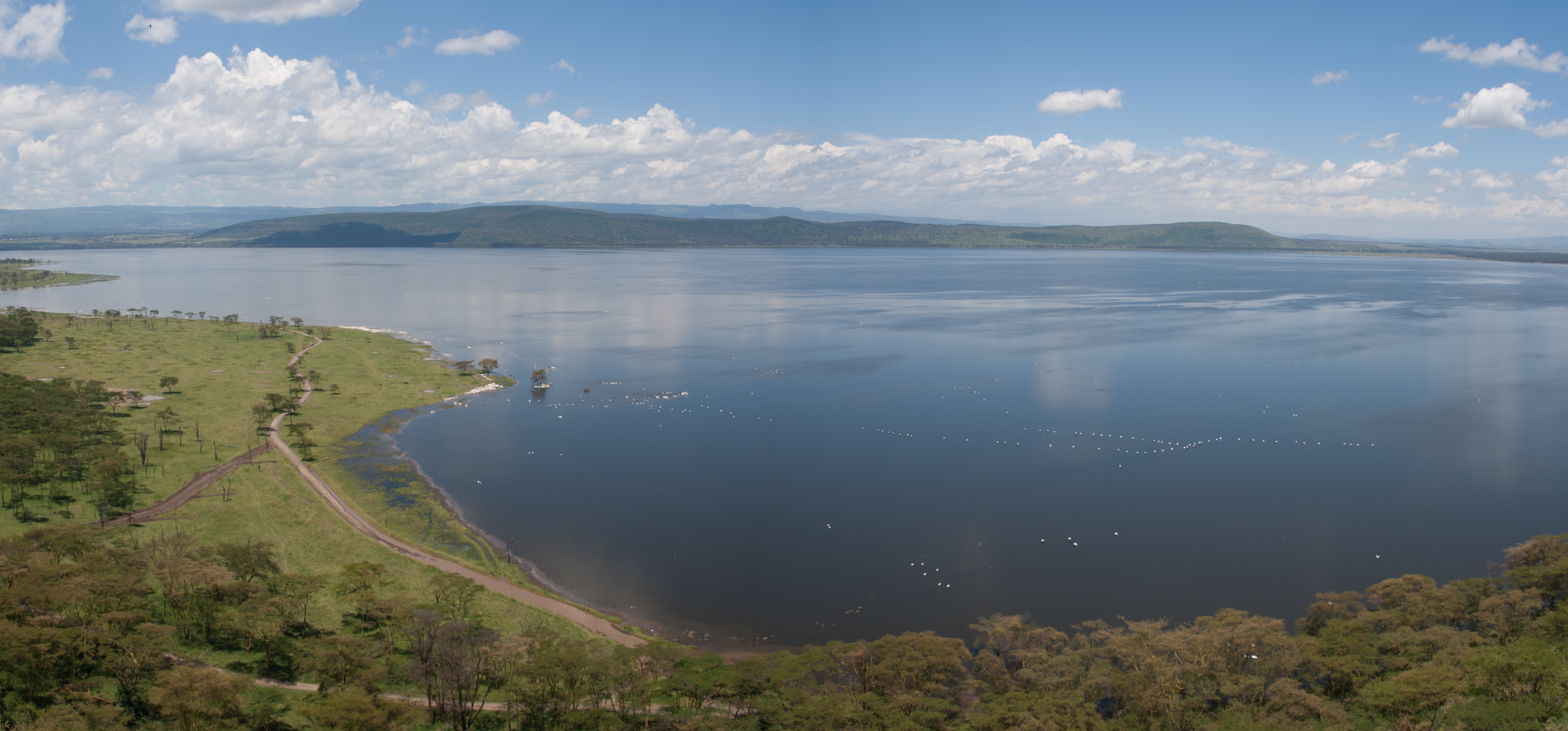

- Location within Kenya
- Coordinates: 0°46′6.70″S 36°21′2.32″E
- Basin countries: Kenya
- Surface area: 139 km^{2} (54 sq mi)
- Average depth: 6 m (20 ft)
- Max. depth: 30 m (98 ft)
- Surface elevation: 1,884 m (6,181 ft)

Ramsar Wetland
- Designated: 10 April 1995
- Reference no.: 724

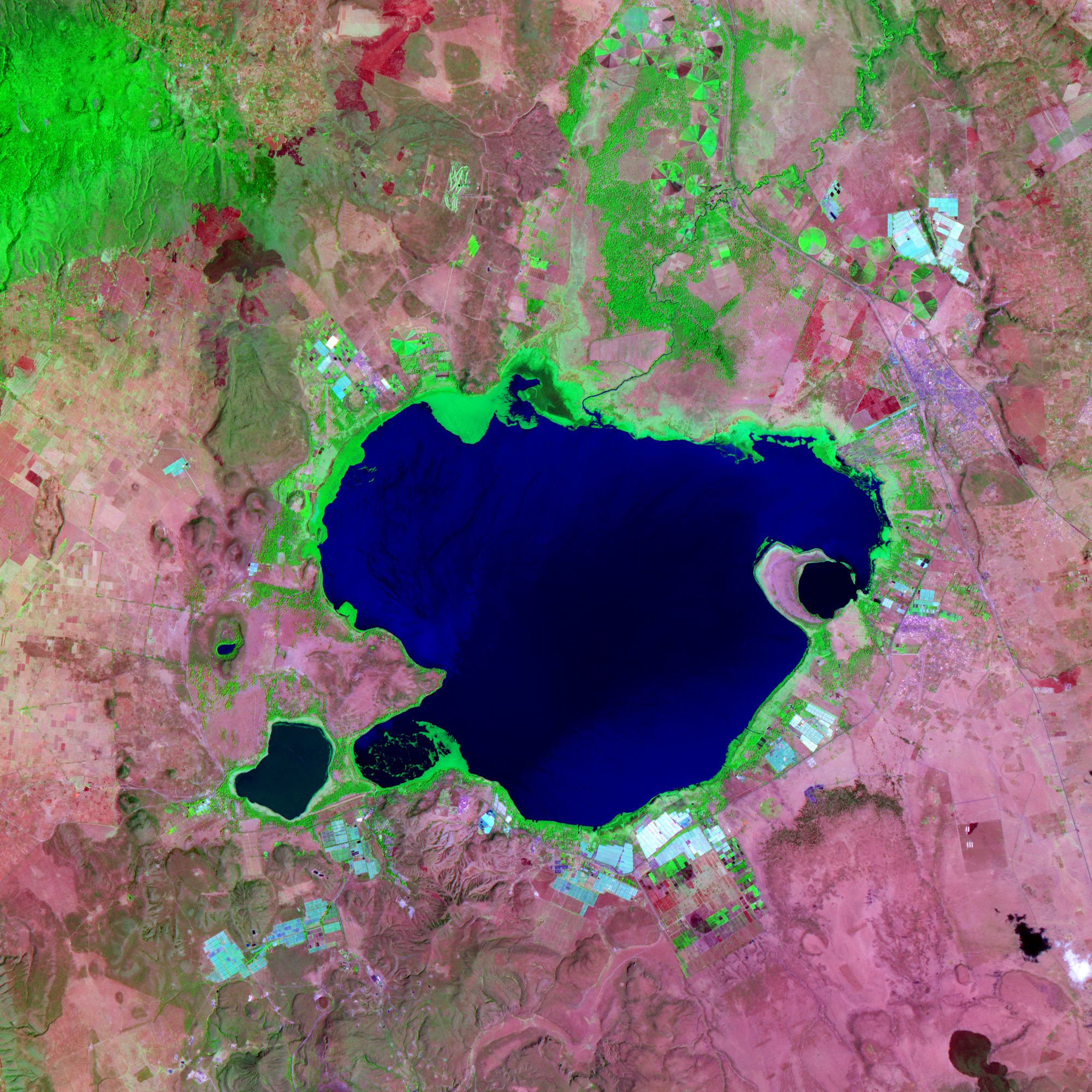
Satellite image of Lake Naivasha

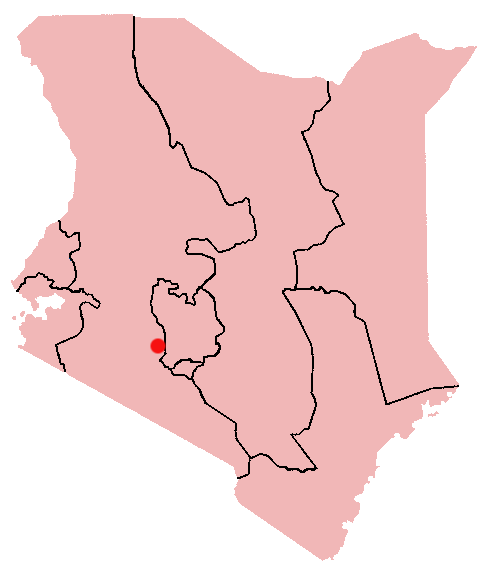
Location of Naivasha in Kenya

Lake Naivasha is a freshwater lake in Kenya, outside the town of Naivasha in Nakuru County, north west of Nairobi in the Great Rift Valley. The name derives from the local Maasai name ɛnaɨpɔ́sha , meaning "that which heaves," a common Maasai word for bodies of water large enough to have wave action when it is windy or stormy. Naivasha arose from a British attempt to pronounce the Maasai name. Literally, Lake Naivasha means "Lake Lake."

== Location ==
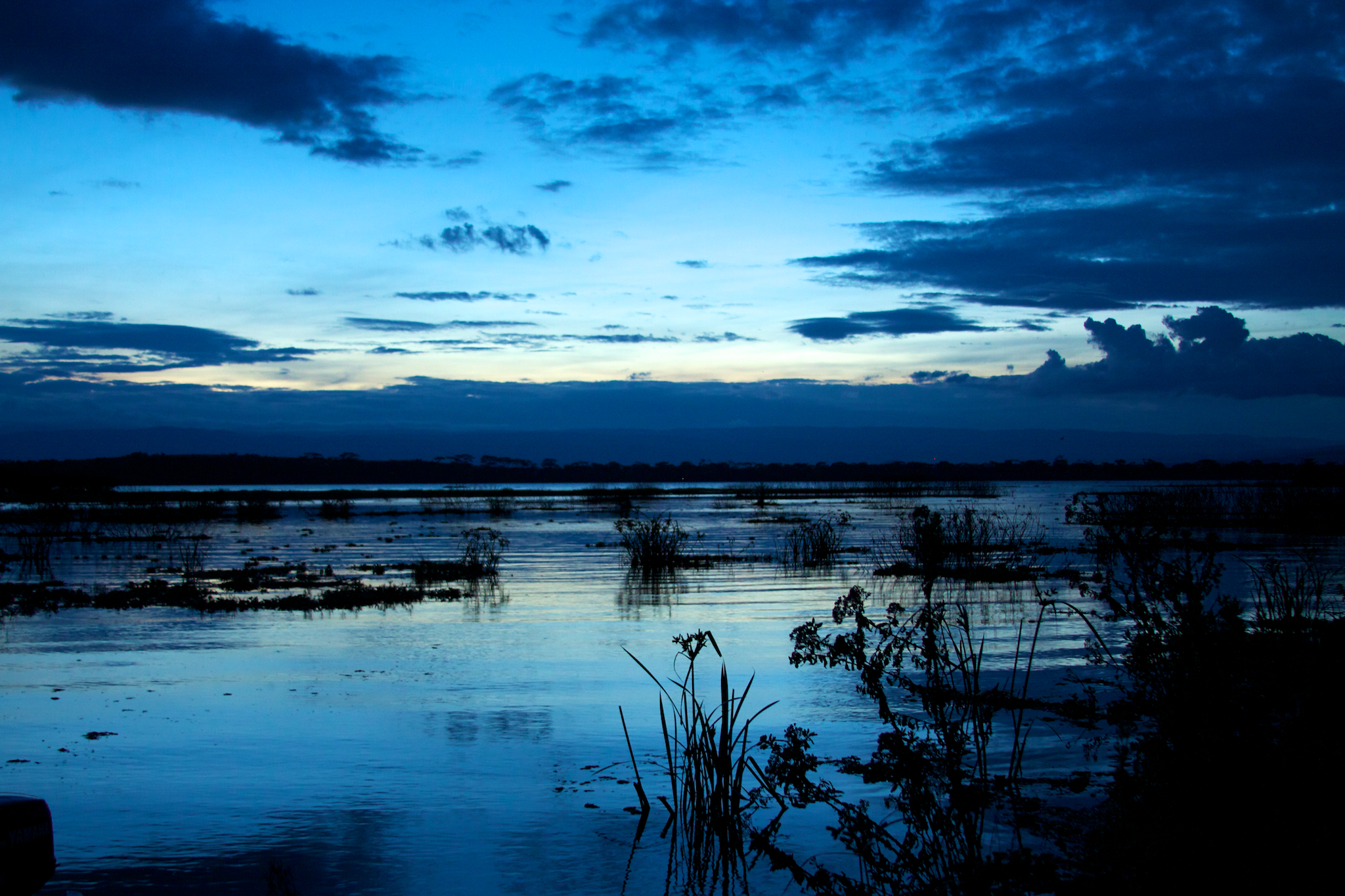
Dusk at Lake Naivasha

Lake Naivasha is a fresh water lake in the Rift valley of Kenya. It is in a complex combination of volcanic rocks and sedimentary deposits from a larger Pleistocene Era lake. Apart from transient streams, the lake is fed by the perennial Malewa and Gilgil rivers. There is no known outlet, but since the lake water is relatively fresh it is assumed to have an underground outflow.

The lake had a normal surface area of 139 square kilometres (54 sq mi) before 2010, and increased to 198 square kilometres (76 sq mi) by 2020. It is surrounded by a swamp of 64 square kilometres (25 sq mi), which varies depending on rainfall. At an altitude of 1,884 metres (6,181 ft), the lake has an average depth of 6 metres (20 ft), with the deepest area being at Crescent Island, with a maximum depth of 30 metres (98 ft). Njorowa Gorge once formed the lake's outlet, but it is now high above the lake and forms the entrance to Hell's Gate National Park. The town of Naivasha (formerly East Nakuru) lies on the north-east edge of the lake.

== Ecology ==
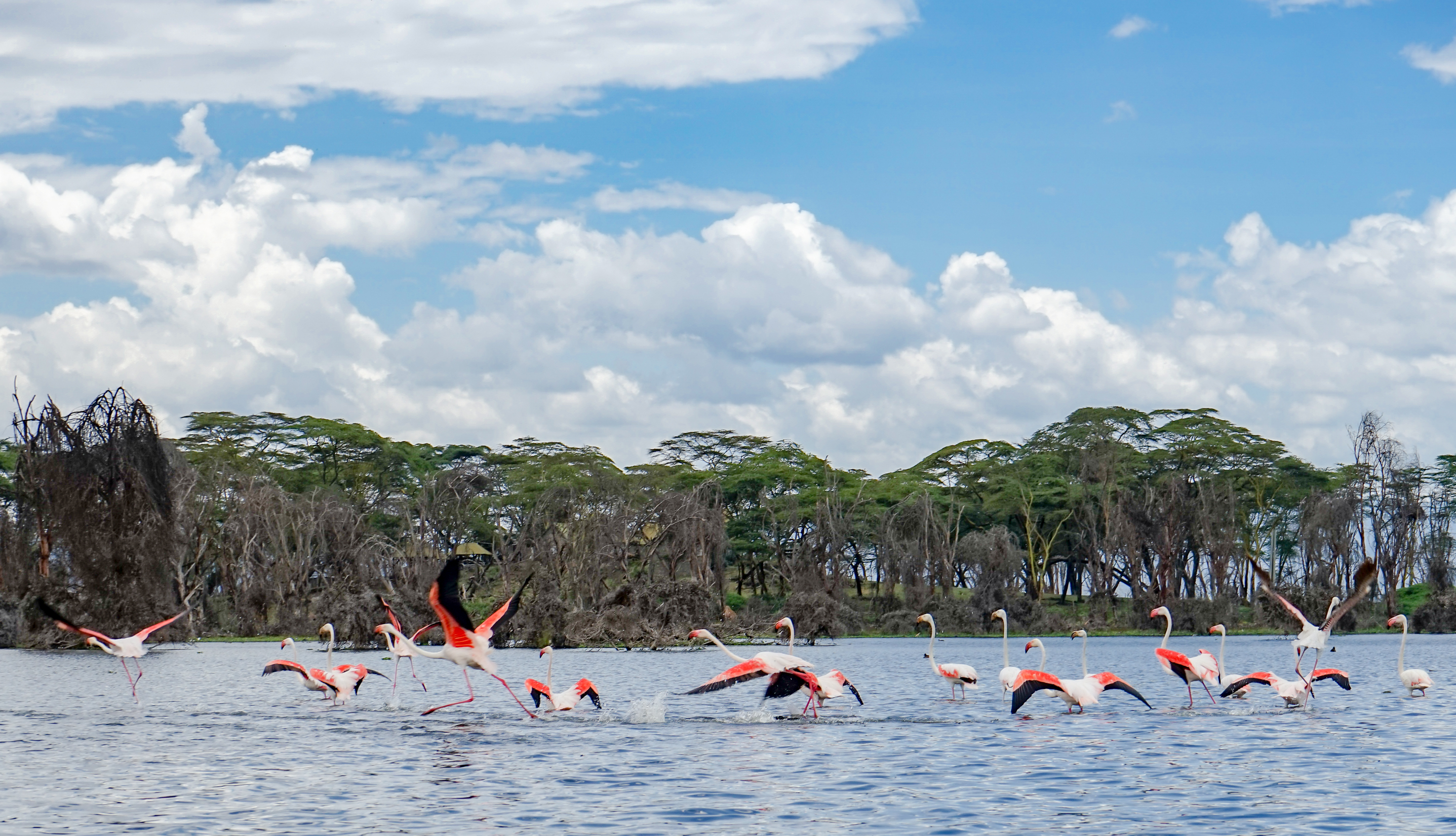
Lake Naivasha National Park

The lake is home to a variety of types of wildlife including over 400 different species of bird and a sizable population of hippos. The fish community in the lake has been highly variable over time, influenced by changes in climate, fishing effort and the introduction of invasive species. The most recent shift in the fish population followed the accidental introduction of common carp in 2001. Nine years later, in 2010, common carp accounted for over 90% of the mass of fish caught in the lake.

There are two smaller lakes in the vicinity of Lake Naivasha: Lake Oloiden and Lake Sonachi (a green crater lake). The Crater Lake Game Sanctuary lies nearby, while the lake shore is known for its population of European immigrants and settlers.

== History ==
Between 1937 and 1950, the lake was used as a landing place for flying boats on the Imperial Airways passenger and mail route from Southampton in Britain to South Africa. It linked Kisumu and Nairobi. Joy Adamson, the author of Born Free, lived on the shores of the lake in the mid-1960s. On the shores of the lake is Oserian ("Djinn Palace"), which gained notoriety in the Happy Valley days between the two world wars. In 1999, the Lake Naivasha Riparian Association received the Ramsar Wetland Conservation Award for its conservation efforts regarding the Lake Naivasha Ramsar site.

== Agriculture and industry ==
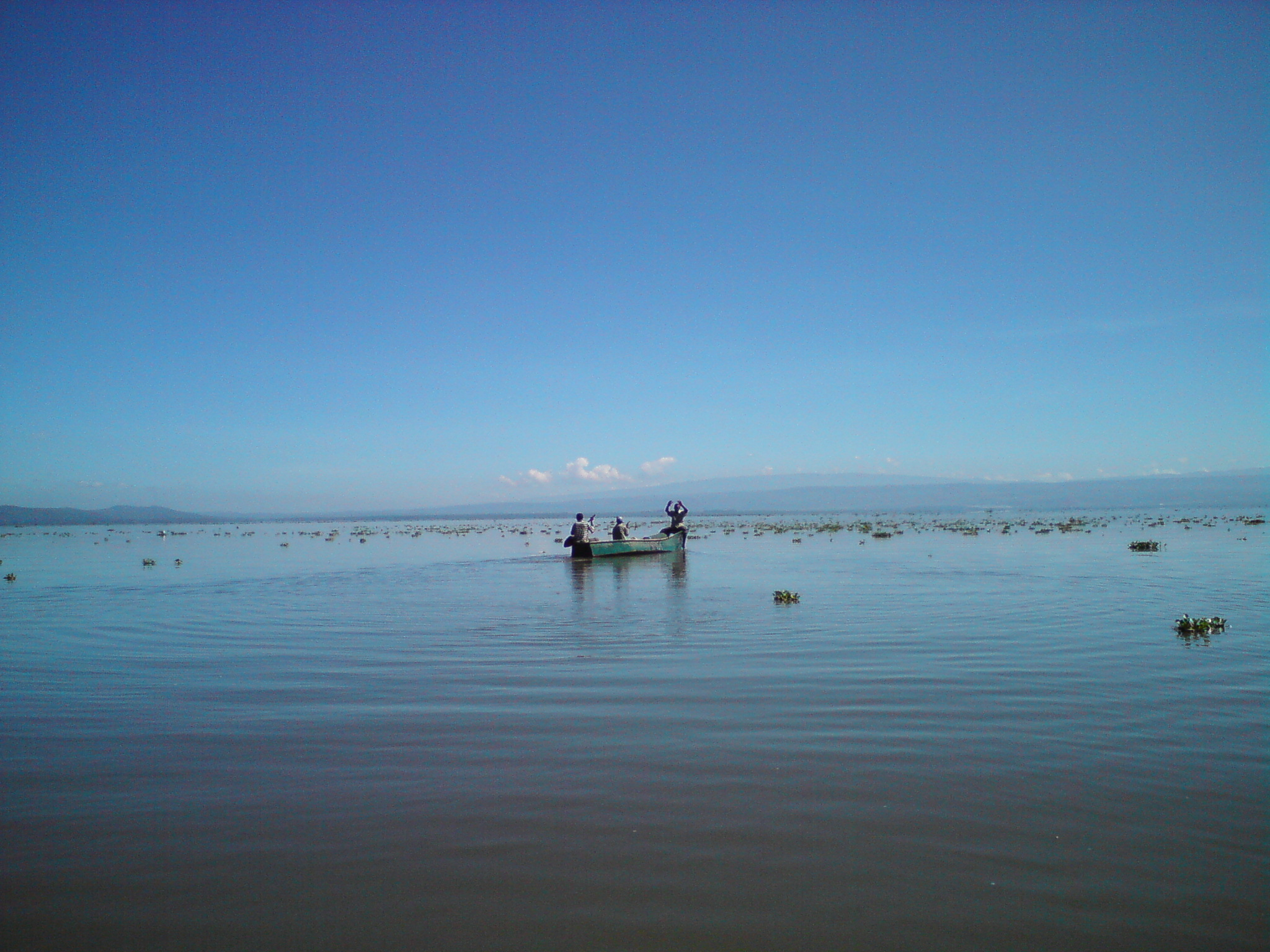
Lake Naivasha

Floriculture forms the main industry around the lake. However, the largely unregulated use of lake water for irrigation is reducing the level of the lake and is the subject of concern in Kenya. Fishing in the lake is a source of employment and income for the local population. The lake varies in level and almost dried up entirely in the 1890s. Lake levels in general follow the rainfall pattern in the catchment area.

Lake Naivasha, once described as the Jewel in the Crown of all the East African lakes, has in recent decades been subjected to a series of devastating human pressures, not least the establishment of a vast horticulture and agriculture industry along its shorelines, but also the ever-increasing inflows of nutrients from siltation, sewage and other effluents emanating from a lakeside human population now approaching a million people.

In 1981, the first geothermal plant for Lake Naivasha was commissioned and by 1985, a total of 45 MW of electricity was being generated in the area.

== Water levels ==
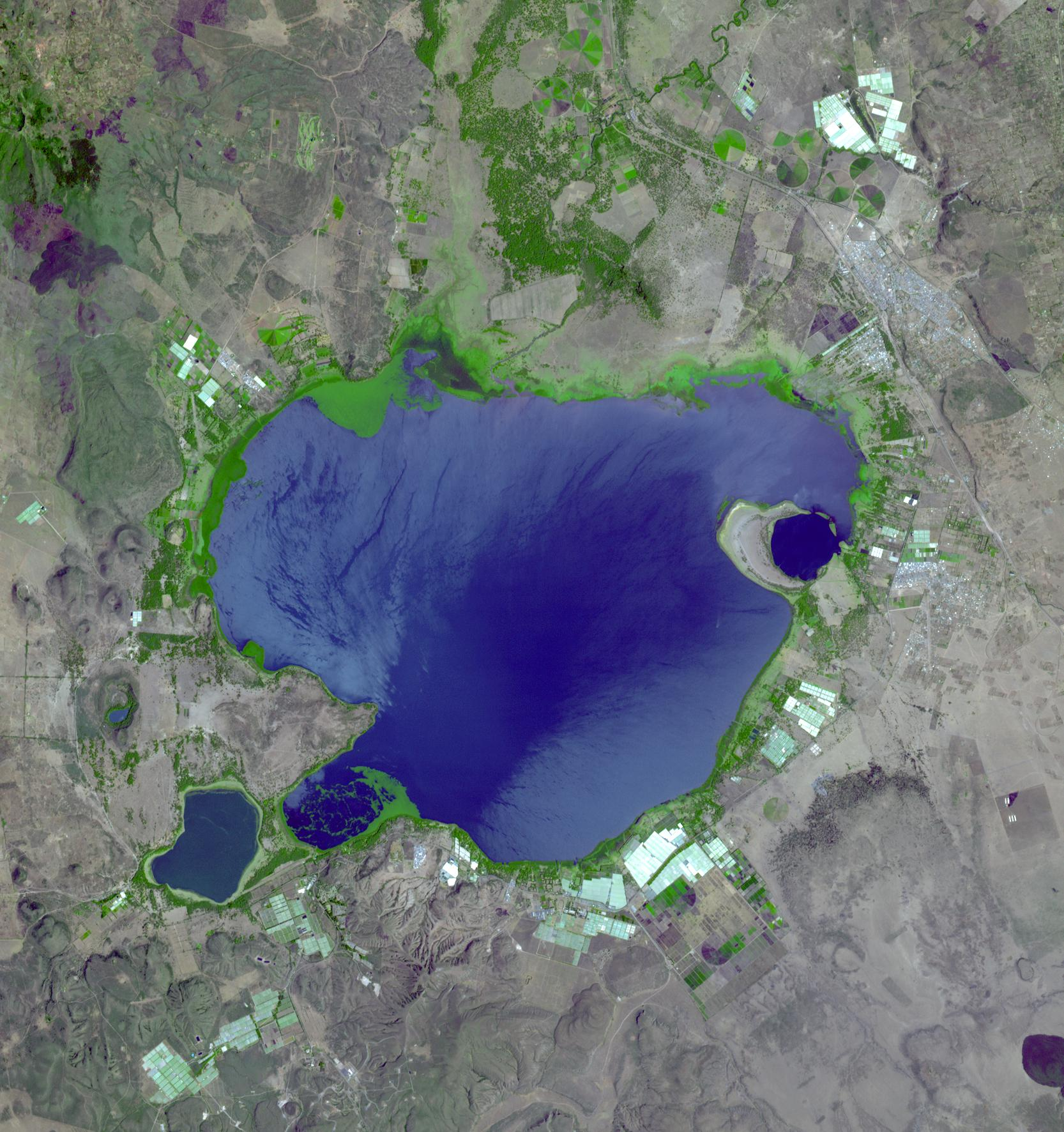
Lake Naivasha

About 10,000 years ago, Lake Naivasha, together with neighboring Lake Elementaita and Lake Nakuru (60 km further north), formed one single, deep freshwater lake that eventually dried up, leaving the three lakes as remnants.

Water levels in the Rift Valley Lakes have since varied considerably, with several of the lakes almost drying up several times.

The water level reached a low of 0.6 m depth in 1945, but the water level rose again, with minor drops, to reach a maximum depth of nearly 6 m in 1968. There was another major decline of the water level in 1987, when the depth reached 2.25 m above the lake bottom. The decline of the lake water level in 1987 increased concern in the future of geothermal industry, it was speculated that Lake Naivasha's underground water might be feeding the geothermal reservoir at Olkaria. Hence, the decline in the lake water would affect the future of the geothermal industry.

The surface area of the lake had increased by over 50% by 2020 causing many people to be displaced from the densely populated areas round the lake. One of the first scientists to notice the expansion of the lake was a geologist who learned, quite by chance, in early 2013 that the lake had "moved 2 km without becoming news".

Lake Naivasha still supports many local companies. Some of them by taking tourists and locals around the lake, showing them the major hippo area as well Crescent Island.
