= Kenya Judges and Magistrates Vetting Board =

The Judges and Magistrates Vetting Board is a board established by the Government of Kenya as a result of the Vetting of Judges and Magistrates Act, 2011, which was passed by parliament to create the necessary institutional framework and guidelines for the vetting of judges and magistrates.

== Objectives ==
The board was set up to vet the suitability of all judges and magistrates in office prior to the promulgation of the new constitution of Kenya, to continue serving in accordance with the values and principles set out in Article 10 and 159 of the new constitution.

== Board membership ==
The board membership consists of the following:

- Sharad Rao – Chairman
- Roseline Odede – Vice chairperson
- Abdirashid Abdullahi
- Justus Munyithiya
- Prof. Ngotho Wa Kariuki
- Meuledi Iseme
- Hon. Justice (Rtd.) Barnabas Albert Samatta
- Hon. Justice (Rtd.) Joseph A. N. De Silva
- Hon. Lady Justice (Rtd. DCJ) A.E.N. Mpagi-Bahigeine
- Reuben Chirchir – Secretary/Chief Executive

== Procedure ==
The board issued regulation that would govern its processes which indicated that information the board receives would be confidential and only used for the intended purpose. The vetting was to be done in private.

== Determinations ==
The following are the determinations that the board has made, several of which are still subject to appeal the board and within the courts:

=== First determination ===
On 25 April 2012, the board issued determinations concerning the judges of the court of appeal. The board found four senior judges unsuitable to continue in office and cleared five other judges.

The Judges found unsuitable were:

- Riaga Omollo – authoritarianism on the Bench and inconsistency, failure to show impartiality during the government of former President Daniel arap Moi.
- Samuel Bosire – condoning torture of suspects during 1982 coup trials, ignored a High Court order to summon retired President Daniel Moi, Prof George Saitoti, Mr Musalia Mudavadi and Mr Nicholas Biwott as witnesses
- Emmanuel O'Kubasu – accepting "gifts" from litigants
- Joseph Nyamu – lack of professionalism and candour, a stumbling block in the fight against corruption (e.g. issued a permanent stay against prosecution of George Saitoti over the Goldenberg scandal

The board cleared the following judges:

- Onyango Otieno
- Erastus Githinji
- Alnashir Visram
- Philip Waki
- Philip Kiptoo Tunoi

=== Second determination ===
On 20 July 2012, the board announced determination on determinations concerning former judges of the high court who are now members of the supreme court and determinations concerning former judges of the high court who are now members of the court of appeal.

Those declared unfit to serve were:

- Mohammed Ibrahim – complaints that he delayed cases brought before him while serving in lower courts
- Roselyne Naliaka Nambuye – delayed judgments for periods ranging from four months to four years

The board cleared the following judges:

- Jackton Ojwang’
- Kihara Kariuki
- Hannah Okwengu

The board deferred its decision on the conduct of Appellate judges Kalpana Hasmukhrai Rawal, Martha Karambu Koome and David Kenani Maraga, who were hearing a case to determine on the date on the elections. The board also upheld its earlier ruling on Court of Appeal judges Riaga Omollo, Emmanuel O'kubasu, Samuel Bosire and Joseph Nyamu.

=== Third determination ===
The board announced determinations concerning the judges of the high court on 3 August 2012.

Those declared unfit to serve were:

- Jeanne Wanjiku Gacheche – used judicial powers in an "inappropriate manner", failed to attune judgments to requirements of the new constitution

The board cleared the following judges:

- Jessie Wanjiku Lessit
- Wanjiru Karanja
- Amraphael Mbogholi Msagha

=== Fourth determination ===
The board's fourth announcement on 21 September 2012 covered both determinations on suitability and requests for review.

Those declared unfit to serve were:

- Joyce Nuku Khaminwa – unsuitable on medical grounds

The board cleared the following judges:

- David Kenani Maraga
- Martha Karambu Koome
- Kalpana Hasmukhrai Rawal

The board also ruled that Supreme Court judge Mohammed Ibrahim and Roselyn Naliaka Nambuye would be vetted afresh setting aside its earlier decision. The verdict that Lady Justice Jeanne Wanjiku Gacheche was unsuitable to serve was upheld.

=== Fifth determination ===
The board issued a determination on 21 December 2012.

Those declared unfit to serve were:

- High Court Judge Mary Ang’awa – her conduct towards lawyer and litigants is rigid
- Nicholas Ombija – temperamental
- Joseph Sergon – credible allegations of corruption and failing to remit client's money, lacks personal integrity
- Murugi Mugo – disrespectful to parties in court
- Leonard Njagi – sanctioned the illegal transfer of public land

The board cleared the following judges:

- Anyara Emukule
- Said Chitembwe
- George Dulu cleared
- GBM Kariuki – asked to work on his temper
- Joseph Karanja
- Luka Kimaru
- Isaac Lenaola
- Milton Makhandia
- Aggrey Muchelule
- Florence Muchemi
- Daniel Musinga
- John Mwera
- Philemon Mwilu
- Fredrick Ochieng
- Maureen Odero
- Hellen Omondi
- David Onyancha
- William Ouko
- Roselyne Wendo
- Ruth Sitati
- Mohamed Warsame
- Hatari Waweru

=== Sixth determination ===
On 15 January 2013, the board cleared the following judges after fresh vetting:

- Supreme Court Judge Mohammed Ibrahim
- Court of Appeal Judge Roselyn Nambuye

The following High Court judges were declared unfit to serve in the judiciary:

- Muga Apondi
- Abida Ali Aroni

Lady Justice Mary Kasango of the High Court was found fit to serve.

== Legal challenges ==
The Centre for Human Rights and Democracy, a human rights lobby, went to court to stop the vetting of Supreme Court judge Mohammed Ibrahim and Court of Appeal Judge Roselyn Nambuye.
