= Jackton Boma Ojwang =

Kenyan justice

The Hon. Justice Jackton Boma Ojwang

Associate Justice
- In office 26 August 2011 – 5 February 2020
- Appointed by: Mwai Kibaki

Personal details
- Born: 1950 (age 75–76) Migori, Kenya
- Education: University of Nairobi
- Occupation: Judge of Supreme Court of Kenya
- Profession: Judge

Jackton Boma Ojwang is a Kenyan lawyer and a retired Justice of the Supreme Court of Kenya. Upon retiring from the Supreme Court, President Uhuru Kenyatta appointed him as chairperson of the Energy and Petroleum Regulatory Authority (EPRA).

== Education ==
Justice Ojwang was born in 1950 in Migori County. He went to Homa Bay High School, sitting for his O-Levels in 1968. He then went to the Thika High School where he sat for his A-Level in 1970. He earned his undergraduate degree in law at the University of Nairobi in 1974 and a master's degree at the same university in 1976.

He earned a PhD degree in comparative constitutional law at Downing College in 1981.

Justice Ojwang worked as a lecturer and served as the Dean of the School of Law at the University of Nairobi from 2000 to 2003. He was also a visiting associate professor of law at the J. Reuben Clark Law School in Brigham Young University.

In September 2015, Ojwang received a Doctor of Laws degree from the University of Nairobi, having successfully defended his thesis, titled The Unity of the Constitution and the Common Law. He became the first sitting Kenyan judge to receive a Doctor of Laws degree.

== Judicial career ==
Ojwang was admitted as an advocate of the High Court of Kenya in September 1983. He joined the Judiciary of Kenya in 2003, serving as a high court judge in Nairobi and Mombasa until 2011.

In June 2012, Ojwang was among 5 Justices nominated to the Supreme Court of Kenya by the Judicial Service Commission, which had interviewed 25 applicants.

He was one of the six judges who dismissed the presidential election petition of March 30, 2013.

When Dr. Willy Mutunga retired from the Office of Chief Justice in June 2016, Justice (Prof) J. B. Ojwang was one of ten people who applied to replace him. He was initially left out of the shortlist and interview schedule prepared by the Judicial Service Commission, but was later invited to interview for the job following a constitutional court case in which the Judicial Service Commission was compelled to interview all applicants who had met the minimum statutory requirements for the job. He was interviewed but was overlooked for the job, with Court of Appeal Judge David Maraga receiving the nomination by the commission.

At the conclusion of the 2017 presidential election petition, Justice Ojwang's rendered a dissenting opinion alongside Lady Justice Njoki Ndung'u, saying there was not enough evidence to meet the threshold to annul the Kenyan presidential election held on August 8, 2017.

== Allegations of Gross Misconduct ==
The Judicial Service Commission received a petition alleging that Justice J. B. Ojwang' had engaged in gross misconduct by failing to disclose his close relations with Migori County Governor Okoth Obado when he handled a case in which the governor was involved. It was also alleged that the Governor had caused a road leading to the Judge's home to be tarmacked as a reward.

He declined summons to appear before the commission to explain his position, forcing a jilted Commission to recommend that the President forms a Tribunal to investigate his conduct.

On the strength of this recommendation, President Kenyatta appointed a Tribunal chaired by Court of Appeal Judge Alnasir Visram to investigate the conduct of the Judge. Other members of the tribunal were Justice Rtd Festus Azangalala, Ambrose Weda, Andrew Bahati Mwamuye, Sylvia Wanjiku Muchiri, Lucy Kanbuni, and Amina Abdalla. Lawyer Paul Nyamodi served as the lead assisting counsel with Stella Munyi as assisting counsel. Mr Peter Kariuki and Josiah Musili served as the Joint Secretaries to the tribunal.

He became the third Judge in the Supreme Court to face an inquiry Tribunal, after Deputy Chief Justice Nancy Baraza and Justice of the Supreme Court Philip Tunoi.

The Tribunal held its proceedings in private, and did not involve the media. After receiving and considering all evidence presented, which included a visit to the Judge's home to investigate whether he benefited from a private road constructed using public funds in exchange for a favorable decision, the Tribunal returned a verdict in August 2019 clearing him of all the allegations of misconduct.

In its findings, the Tribunal faulted the JSC for refusing the Judge the chance to appear before the sub-committee through his lawyer rather than in person, for relying on draft rules of procedure to determine the process to be followed during the proceedings, for failing to consider evidence from a surveyor the commission had retained to check whether the road in question was private or public, and for insisting that the Judge should appear before JSC Commissioners who had adopted a hostile line of questioning during his interviews for the office of Chief Justice. The Tribunal also noted that whereas the Judge was accused of rendering a decision that was favorable to the Migori County Governor, the judgment in question was taken unanimously by all the Judges of the Supreme Court.

== Life After Supreme Court ==
Justice Ojwang' retired from the Supreme Court in February 2020 when he reached the mandatory retirement age of 70. In May of the same year, President Uhuru Kenyatta appointed him to chair the Board of Directors of the Energy and Petroleum Regulatory Authority (EPRA). His appointment was viewed as a reward for his pro-government decisions while on the Supreme Court, particularly his dissenting vote to affirm President Kenyatta's win in the 2017 Presidential election which was nullified by the majority.

This move attracted outrage from several Kenyans given his advanced age, the lack of transparency in the appointment process and the need to create opportunities for younger people. Kenyans were particularly angered by this appointment given that just the previous month, President Kenyatta had handed a similar appointment to Justice Erastus Githinji who had retired from the Court of Appeal on reaching 70 years. Justice Githinji was appointed by the President to chair the Tax Appeals Tribunal though the High Court issued temporary orders stopping him from taking office after the Law Society of Kenya filed a constitutional reference.

== See also ==
- Supreme Court of Kenya
