= Deputy Chief Justice of Kenya =

The deputy chief justice of Kenya is the deputy to the chief justice and deputy president of the Supreme Court of Kenya. The office is established under Article 163 of the Kenyan Constitution. The current deputy chief justice is Lady Justice Philomena Mwilu. The office remained vacant from October 12, 2012 following the resignation of Nancy Makokha Baraza Court of Appeal Judge Kalpana Rawal was nominated by the JSC to fill the position. Judge Kalpana Rawal was retired by the Supreme Court of Kenya after a case on retirement age was dismissed at the Supreme Court of Kenya on 14 June 2016.

== Appointment and tenure of office ==
The deputy chief justice is selected by the Judicial Service Commission following an open recruitment process before formal appointment by the president. The candidate nominated for appointment must be vetted and approved by the National Assembly. Just like the chief justice and other judges of the Supreme Court, a candidate for the deputy chief justice must possess a minimum of 15 years experience in law. Unlike the chief justice who is limited to a maximum of 10 years in office, the deputy chief justice serves until retirement at the age of 70, or when one is removed from office for gross misconduct.

== Duties ==
The mandate of the deputy chief justice is to serve as the deputy head of the judiciary as well as the vice president of the Supreme Court of Kenya. The deputy chief justice can perform the administrative and judicial functions of the chief justice in the absence of the chief justice, such as presiding over the sittings of the Supreme Court and the swearing in of the president of Kenya following an election.

== List of deputy chief justices ==
#	Name	Took office	Left office	Appointed by
1	Nancy Makokha Baraza	2011	2012	Mwai Kibaki
2	Kalpana Rawal	2013	2016	Uhuru Kenyatta
3	Philomena Mwilu	2016		Uhuru Kenyatta

== See also ==
- Baraza-Kerubo Village Market incident
- Nancy Makokha Baraza
- Supreme Court of Kenya
