= Mitu-Bell Welfare Society v KAA =

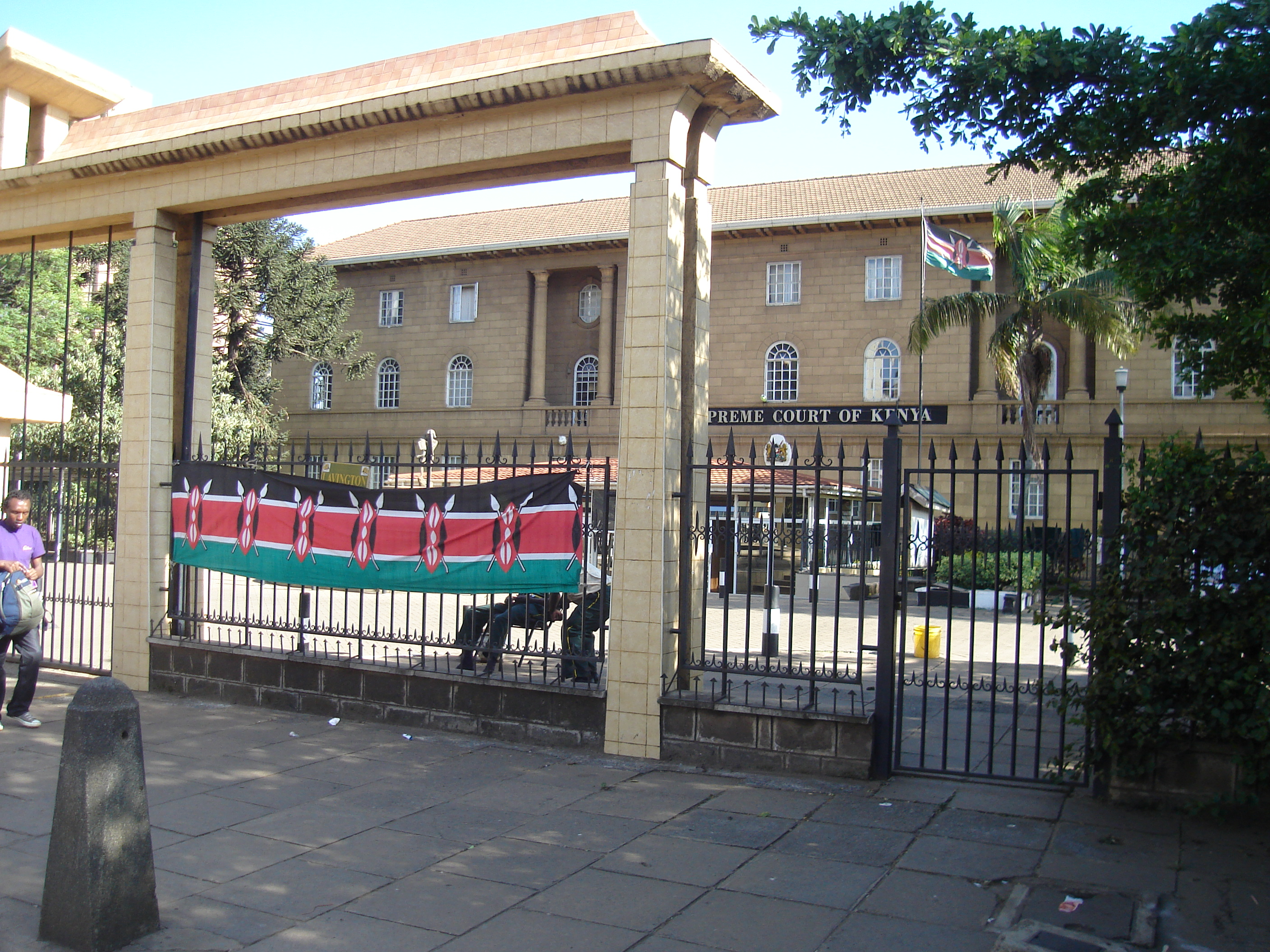
- Court: Supreme Court of Kenya
- Decided: 11 January 2021
- Citations: Mitu-Bell Welfare Society v Kenya Airports Authority & 2 others; Initiative for Strategic Litigation in Africa (Amicus Curiae) (Petition 3 of 2018) [2021] KESC 34 (KLR)

Case history
- Appealed from: Court of Appeal of Kenya

Mitu-Bell Welfare Society v Kenya Airports Authority & 2 others; Initiative for Strategic Litigation in Africa (Amicus Curiae) (Petition 3 of 2018) [2021] KESC 34 (KLR) was a landmark decision by the Supreme Court of Kenya that dealt with the issue of forced evictions and the right to housing. The case arose from the eviction of over 3,000 families from Mitumba Village, a settlement located near Wilson Airport in Nairobi. The Kenya Airports Authority (KAA) owned the land on which Mitumba Village was located, but the residents had been living there for over 19 years. In 2011, the people of Mitumba village were evicted from their homes. The eviction was carried out by the Kenya Airports Authority, despite the fact that Mitu-Bell society on behalf of the residents had obtained conservatory orders from the High Court to prevent it. The matter was then appealed to the Court of Appeal, which overturned the High Court's decision. The Court of Appeal held that the High Court had no jurisdiction to hear the case because the society had not exhausted all of their administrative remedies. The society then appealed to the Supreme Court.

The Supreme Court upheld the High Court's decision, finding that the residents had a right to housing under the Kenyan Constitution. The Supreme Court also held that the High Court had jurisdiction to hear the case. The Supreme Court ordered the KAA to compensate the residents and to rebuild their homes. This case also cemented the use of structural interdicts by the courts in Kenya when enforcing socio-economic rights.

== Ruling ==
In a landmark decision the court overturned the decision of the Court of Appeal and found in favor of the Mitu-Bell Welfare Society, it held that the evictions were unlawful and a violation of the right to housing under Article 43(1) of the Constitution.In issuing it's orders the court observed that structural interdicts are recognized reliefs in human rights litigation under the Constitution.

As a relief, the Court ordered the Kenya Airports Authority to pay compensation to the Mitu-Bell Welfare Society and to provide them with alternative land on which to rebuild their homes.
