= Judicial Service Commission (Kenya) =

Kenyan body overseeing judicial appointments.

The Judicial Service Commission (JSC) of Kenya is an independent Commission established under Article 171 of the Constitution of Kenya. Its mandate as stipulated in Article 172 of the Constitution is to promote and facilitate the independence and accountability of the Judiciary and the efficient, effective and transparent administration of justice. The commission has 11 members with the initial team appointed in December 2010.

== Role ==
The Key functions of the JSC are:

- Recommend individuals to the President for appointment as judges
- Review and recommend the conditions of service of judges and judicial officers, other than their remuneration and the staff of the Judiciary
- Appoint, receive complaints against, investigate and remove from office or otherwise discipline registrars, magistrates, other judicial officers and other staff of the Judiciary, in the manner prescribed by an Act of Parliament
- Prepare and implement programmes for the continuing education and training of judges and judicial officers
- Advise the national government on improving the efficiency of the administration of justice.

== Composition ==
Under Article Article 171(1) of the Constitution of Kenya, the Judicial Service Commission consists of the following 11 members:

- The Chief Justice, who shall be the chairperson of the Commission;
- One Supreme Court judge elected by the judges of the Supreme Court;
- One Court of Appeal judge elected by the judges of the Court of Appeal;
- One High Court judge and one magistrate, one a woman and one a man, elected by the members of the association of judges and magistrates;
- The Attorney-General;
- Two advocates, one a woman and one a man, each of whom has at least fifteen years’ experience, elected by the members of the statutory body responsible for the professional regulation of advocates;
- One person nominated by the Public Service Commission;
- One woman and one man to represent the public, not being lawyers, appointed by the President with the approval of the National Assembly.

The Chief Registrar of the Judiciary serves as the Secretary to the JSC.

== Members ==
=== Current ===
The current membership of the JSC is as follows:

- Hon. Lady Justice Martha Koome, Chief Justice & President of the Supreme Court of Kenya - Chairperson of the Commission
- Hon Lady Justice Njoki Susanna Ndungu Justice - Judge of the Supreme Court of Kenya - Elected by, and representing Judges of the Supreme Court
- Hon Lady Justice Fatuma Sichale, Judge Court of Appeal of Kenya - Elected by, and representing Judges of the Court of Appeal
- Hon Dorcas Agik Oduor, Attorney General of the Republic of Kenya - Ex Officio
- Hon Justice Anthony Mrima, Judge of the High Court - Elected male representative of the association of judges and magistrates
- Hon. Everlyne Olwande, Chief Magistrate - Elected female representative of the association of judges and magistrates
- Mr. Omwanza Ombati, Advocate of the High Court of Kenya - Elected male representative of the Law Society of Kenya
- Ms Jacqueline Ingutiah, Advocate of the High Court of Kenya - Elected female representative of the Law Society of Kenya
- Ms Caroline Nzilani - Appointed by the President as female representative of the public
- Hon Isaac Ruto - Appointed by the President as male representative of the public
- Ms Charity Kisotu - Representative of the Public Service Commission

Hon. Winfridah Boyani Mokaya, Chief Registrar of the Judiciary serves as the Secretary to the Commission.

=== Past ===
- Justice David Majanja, Judge of the High Court of Kenya - Elected by, and representing Judges of the High Court
- Justice Mohammed Khadhar Ibrahim - Judge of the Supreme Court of Kenya - Elected by, and representing Judges of the Supreme Court
- Mr Macharia Njeru - Law Society male representative
- Justice Mohamed Warsame, Judge Court of Appeal of Kenya - Served from March 2013 to January 2024 as the representative of the Judges of the Court of Appeal
- Prof. Olive Mugenda - Served from 2018 to 2023 as presidential nominee, representing members of the public
- Mr. Patrick Gichohi - Representing Public Service Commission
- Mr. Felix Koskei - Served as presidential nominee representing members of the public
- Justice Rtd. Paul Kihara Kariuki, Attorney General of the Republic of Kenya
- Justice Philomena Mwilu, Deputy Chief Justice, Judge of the Supreme Court of Kenya - served in the JSC from May 2017 to May 2022 as the representative of Judges of the Supreme Court
- Dr. Mercy Mwara Deche, Advocate of the High Court of Kenya - Elected by, and representing the Law Society of Kenya, served as Vice Chair of the Commission from 2018 to March 2021
- Justice David Maraga, Retired Chief Justice / President of the Supreme Court of Kenya, served as Chair of the Commission between 2016 and January 2021
- Justice Willy Mutunga, Retired Chief Justice / President of the Supreme Court of Kenya, served as Chair of the Commission between 2011 and 2016
- Justice Smokin Wanjala - served as representative of Supreme Court Judges
- Justice Isaac Lenaola, currently Associate Justice of the Supreme Court, served in the JSC from 2010 - 2013 as the representative of High Court Judges
- Justice Aggrey Muchelule - served as representative of High Court Judges
- Prof. Githu Muigai - served during his tenure as Attorney General
- Hon. Emily Ominde - served from 2010 - 2020 as the representative of Magistrates
- Florence Mwangangi, Advocate of the High Court of Kenya, served as representative of the Law Society of Kenya
- Prof. Tom Ojienda, Senior Counsel, served as representative of the Law Society of Kenya
- Prof. Margaret Kobia, PhD, Commissioner, served as representative of the Public Service Commission
- Kipng’etich arap Korir Bett - served as presidential nominee
- Hon. Anne Amadi, served as the Chief Registrar of the Judiciary and Secretary to the Commission from January 2014 to January 2024.

== Events ==
=== Justice interviews ===
The first high profile actions carried out by the newly appointed JSC were public interviews for the Chief Justice and Deputy Chief Justice positions in May 2011. The Commission nominated lawyers Willy Munyoki Mutunga and Nancy Baraza for the positions of Kenya's Chief Justice and Deputy Chief Justice respectively. The names were forwarded to President Mwai Kibaki, who then submitted them to Parliament after consultation with the Prime Minister Raila Odinga where they were approved.

The Judicial Service Commission, interviewed 25 applicants and in June 2011 nominated 5 Justices to the Supreme Court of Kenya.

=== Baraza-Kerubo Village Market incident ===
In January 2012, the Judicial Service Commission formed a sub-committee to investigate reports that Deputy Chief Justice Nancy Baraza assaulted a security guard at the Village Market shopping mall on 31 December 2011. The JSC subsequently recommended her suspension to President Mwai Kibaki and requested the President to appoint a tribunal to investigate her conduct in line with Article 168 (4) of the Constitution. After her suspension, a commission formed to investigate her conduct recommended her removal from office. On 18 October, she subsequently resigned after withdrawing her supreme court appeal of the tribunal's verdict.

=== 2012–2013 Deputy Chief Justice recruitment ===
The vacant position of Deputy Chief Justice was advertised by the Commission (JSC) on 9 November 2012. The JSC however re-advertised because it was dissatisfied by the number of applicants. The position subsequently attracted applications from 17 women and one man. Those shortlisted for the position were:

- Court of Appeal Judge Kalpana Rawal
- Raychelle Omamo Awuor – first woman chair of the Law Society of Kenya and Kenya ambassador to France
- Joyce Miguda Majiwa – former executive director of FIDA
- Lucy Muthoni Kambuni – former Law Society of Kenya vice-chairperson
- Okawa Phoebe Nyawade – an advocate of the High Court in private practice

The justices who failed to make the short-list were Roselyn Nambuye, Fatuma Sichale, Fatuma Sichale, Wanjiru Karanja, Grace Wangui Ngenye, Ruth Sitati, Helen Omondi, Hannah Okwengu and Mary Ang'awa. On 22 February 2013, the JSC announced that after completing the interviews it had nominated Court of Appeal Judge Kalpana Rawal. There will however be a longer wait for the next steps in the process as the current parliament completed its term and the next Parliament is to be elected during the March general Election. The new parliament will then form departmental committees including the one on Justice and Legal Affairs which will then vet her suitability for the office.
