= Ouko =

Ouko is a Kenyan surname. Notable people with this surname include:

- Robert Ouko (1948–2019), Kenyan athlete
- Robert Ouko (1931–1990), Kenyan politician
- William Ouko, Kenyan Supreme Court Judge and lawyer
