= Baraza-Kerubo Village Market incident =

The Baraza-Kerubo Village Market incident occurred when the then Kenyan Deputy Chief Justice Nancy Makokha Baraza pulled a gun on Rebecca Kerubo, who worked as a guard at the Village Market shopping mall in Nairobi. It led to the suspension and subsequent resignation of the Deputy Chief justice after less than one year in office.

== Initial media reports ==
In January 2012, local media reported that an incident had occurred between the Deputy Chief Justice and a security guard. The Deputy Chief Justice Nancy Baraza issued a statement denying the allegations

== JSC probe ==
In January 2012, the Judicial Service Commission formed a sub-committee to investigate reports that Deputy Chief Justice Nancy Baraza assaulted a security guard at the Village Market shopping mall on 31 December 2011.

== Suspension and tribunal ==
The JSC subsequently recommended her suspension to President Mwai Kibaki and asked that the President appoint a tribunal to investigate her conduct in line with Article 168 (4) of the Constitution. After her suspension, a commission formed to investigate her conduct recommended her removal from office.

== Supreme Court appeal ==
On 9 August 2012, Justice Baraza filed a notice of appeal against a tribunal's recommendation that she should be sacked. She said she was "dissatisfied" with the decision

== Resignation ==
On 18 October, Baraza resigned after withdrawing her supreme court appeal of the tribunal's verdict.

== See also ==
- Judicial Service Commission (Kenya)
- Supreme Court of Kenya
