= Sharad Rao =

Sharad Rao may refer to:

- Sharad Rao (cricketer) (1957–2017), Indian cricketer
- Sharad Rao (judge) (born 1936), Kenyan judge
