= First inauguration of Uhuru Kenyatta =

Inauguration of Kenya's 4th President

Inauguration of Uhuru Kenyatta
- Date: 9 April 2013; 13 years ago
- Location: Kasarani Stadium, Nairobi, Kenya
- Participants: Uhuru Kenyatta

The inauguration of Uhuru Kenyatta as the 4th president of Kenya took place on 9 April 2013. Kenyatta won 50.07% of the vote in the 2013 presidential election, after the supreme court dismissed the Raila petition on 30 March 2013. According to Article 141 (2) (b) of the constitution, in case the Supreme Court upholds the victory of the president-elect, the swearing in will take place on "the first Tuesday following the seventh day following the date on which the court renders a decision declaring the election to be valid." The event was held at Kasarani Stadium. A reception bouquet took place at State House, Nairobi.

== Background ==
When the first round of the presidential election took place on 4 March 2013, Uhuru Kenyatta was declared the president-elect of Kenya by the Independent Electoral and Boundaries Commission. Raila Odinga challenged this in the Supreme Court of Kenya. However, his petition was dismissed on March 30, 2013.

Uhuru swearing will be 7th in Kenya after Jomo Kenyatta (1964), Daniel Arap Moi (1978, 1992, 1997) and Mwai Kibaki (2002, 2007)

== Goodwill messages ==
=== Multilateral organisations ===
- African Union: Chairperson of the African Union Commission Nkosazana Dlamini-Zuma issued a statement saluting the people of Kenya for their peaceful elections. She congratulated the president-elect, his running mate, the candidates and their parties for their contributions in this democratic process held under the new constitution. She also congratulated the Independent Electoral and Boundaries Commission (IEBC) for conducting a complex electoral process.
- East African Community: Secretary General Richard Sezibera congratulated Kenyatta on his win. He pledged the community's continued support and was looking forward to work with him on the East African integration.

=== Africa ===
- Botswana: Foreign Minister Phandu Skelemani said that Kenyatta should not set foot in Botswana if he refuses to cooperate with the International Criminal Court (ICC). He later retracted his earlier statement and apologised to Kenyans by saying that "Kenyatta is more than welcome to visit Botswana.. Botswana is cognisant of a section of the law that says one is innocent until proven guilty."
- Burundi: Ambassador Ezechiel Nibigira conveyed President Pierre Nkurunziza's congratulatory message.
- Djibouti: President Ismaïl Omar Guelleh congratulated Kenyatta saying that the fact that he was elected in the first round shows the faith Kenyans have in his capacity to deliver.
- Egypt: The Egyptian Ambassador to Kenya Kadri Abdel Mottaleb delivered President Mohamed Morsi's congratulatory message.
- Ethiopia: President Girma Wolde-Giorgis sent a congratulatory message to Kenyatta and wished him success for his term and anticipated close bilateral cooperation between the two countries.
- Nigeria: President Goodluck Jonathan congratulated Kenyatta and urged him to continue with the process of national healing and reconciliation. He also urged him to form an administration that will meet the aspirations of all Kenyans.
- Kenya: Outgoing President Mwai Kibaki congratulated Kenyatta.
- Rwanda: Foreign Minister Louise Mushikiwabo sent a congratulatory message on behalf of President Paul Kagame upon Kenyatta's victory saying that Rwanda supports the choice of Kenyans.
- Somalia: President Hassan Sheikh Mohamud congratulated Kenyatta on his victory. He urged the other candidates to respect the outcome of the election.
- South Africa: President Jacob Zuma congratulated Kenyatta and the Kenyan people following the successful elections and looks forward to strength bilateral relations.
- South Sudan: The government congratulated Kenyatta and the Kenyan people on their country's successful elections. It said that its desire was to see the will of the Kenyan people expressed freely and fairly.
- Sudan: President Omar al-Bashir conveyed his congratulatory message via the Sudanese Ambassador in Kenya.
- Tanzania: President Jakaya Kikwete sent his congratulations on behalf of the government and citizens of Tanzania. He said his victory represented the trust and hope of the Kenyan people in his leadership.
- Uganda: President of Uganda Yoweri Museveni congratulated Kenyatta saying that their conduct has redeemed the honor of Kenya and Africa. He looked forward to consolidate the brotherly relations between their countries.
- Zimbabwe: ZANU-PF described Kenyatta's victory as a wake-up call to MDC leader Morgan Tsvangirai, whose ally Raila Odinga was defeated. It called it a stunning "articulation to date of a renewed mood of self-assertion by Africa's anti-colonial leaders."

=== Americas ===
- Cuba: Ambassador Raúl Rodríguez Ramos delivered the congratulatory message from President Raúl Castro.

=== Asia ===
- China: Foreign Ministry spokeswoman congratulated Kenyatta on winning the election. She said that China values its relations with Kenya and regards it as an important partner.
- India: High Commissioner Sibabrata Tripathi delivered President Pranab Mukherjee's congratulatory message.
- Pakistan: High Commissioner Rafi-uz-Zaman Siddiqui conveyed a congratulatory message from President Asif Ali Zardari.
- Qatar: Ambassador Ibrahim bin Mohamed conveyed King Khalifa's congratulatory message.
- Saudi Arabia: Ambassador Ghurum Bin Said Ghurum conveyed King Abdullah's congratulatory message.

=== Europe ===
- Russia: congratulated Kenyatta on his win and pledged to strengthen bilateral relations between the two nations.

== Planning ==
No activities will take place at the Kasarani Stadium between 9 March and the inauguration date as security officers make the necessary arrangements. More than 100,000 people are expected to attend the ceremony along with foreign heads of state.

All president of EAC and neighbouring country have been invited as well as UK prime minister, EU president and President of USA.

The schedule of the day according to Francis Kimemia the chairman committee of Assumption of power of the will be as follow

- 10:00 am: All guests and members of the public are seated at the Kasarani Sports Complex
- 10:30 am: Service Commanders (heads of Kenya Army, Kenya Navy and Kenya Airforce) arrive
- 10:45 am: Invited Heads of State and governments arrive
- 11:00 am: Chief of Defence Forces, Gen Karangi, arrives
- 11:05 am: Chief Justice Willy Mutunga and Chief Registrar Gladys Shollei as well as Supreme Court judges arrive
- 11:30 am: Guard of Honour marches to position
- 11:35 am: Deputy President-elect William Ruto arrives
- 11:40 am: President-elect Uhuru Kenyatta arrives
- 11:45 am: President Kibaki arrives at Kasarani, is received by General Karangi and escorted to the ceremonial Land-Rover to enter the stadium. After the National Anthem, Kibaki will inspect the Guard of Honour.
- 12:10 pm: Gladys Shollei, the Chief Registrar of the Judiciary is the one to administer the oaths to Kenyatta and Ruto. She takes to the podium and invites CJ Mutunga who will serve as a witness. The Chief Justice will introduce Kenyatta and Ruto to the public and ask Kenyatta to take his position.

Kenyatta will take two oaths; – one pledging allegiance to the Constitution and the second is the solemn affirmation of due execution of office of president.

President Kibaki will then hand over the Instruments of Power and Authority to Kenyatta, which will be followed by fanfare and the National Anthem during which Kibaki's presidential Standard will be lowered while Kenyatta's will be hoisted simultaneously.

A 21-gun salute will follow, and Kibaki will be given his Standard by the Chief of Defence Forces.

Ruto will then take his two oaths, after which the Guard of Honour will march off the stadium to be followed by a session of entertainment. "Once he is sworn in, Deputy President William Ruto will invite Uganda's President Yoweri Museveni to make a speech on behalf of invited dignitaries and then invite outgoing President Mwai Kibaki to make his valedictory speech," Kimemia said. Ruto will then deliver his speech as Deputy President and then invite Kenyatta to make his inaugural address to the nation.

Once the festivities which are set to begin at 10 am and end at 2 pm are over, Kibaki will lead the way out and receive Kenyatta at State House where a lunch with invited Heads of State will take place before leaving the house on the hill and all it entails to him

== Foreign dignitaries ==
The following dignitaries attended the ceremony:

Heads of state and government
Algeria	Prime Minister	Abdelmalek Sellal
Democratic Republic of the Congo	President	Joseph Kabila
Djibouti	President	Ismaïl Omar Guelleh
Egypt	Prime Minister	Hesham Qandil
Ethiopia	Prime Minister	Hailemariam Desalegn
Gabon	President	Ali Bongo Ondimba
Morocco	Prime Minister	Abdelilah Benkirane
Nigeria	President	Goodluck Jonathan
Rwanda	President	Paul Kagame
Somalia	President	Hassan Sheikh Mohamud
South Africa	President	Jacob Zuma
South Sudan	President	Salva Kiir
Tanzania	President	Jakaya Kikwete
Uganda	President	Yoweri Museveni
Zimbabwe	President	Robert Mugabe
Government representatives
Brazil	Under SG for Africa and the Middle East	Paulo Cordeiro de Andrade Pinto
Burundi	1st Vice-President	Therence Sinunguruza
China	Special Envoy	Zhang Baowen
Ghana	Minister for Foreign Affairs	Hanna Tetteh
India	Minister of State for H.R. Development	Shashi Tharoor
Mexico		María de Lourdes Aranda Bezaury
Malawi	Vice President	Khumbo Kachali
Seychelles	Vice President	Danny Faure
Sri Lanka	Deputy Minister for Civil Aviation	Gitanjana Gunawardena
South Korea	Special Presidential Envoy	Choung Byoung
United Arab Emirates	Minister of Energy	Suhail Al Mazrouie
Vatican City	Special Envoy of His Holiness	Francisco Padilla
Zambia	Vice President	Guy Scott
Heads of multilateral organizations
African Union	Chairperson of the AU Commission	Nkosazana Dlamini-Zuma
COMESA	Secretary General	Sindiso Ngwenya
Commonwealth of Nations	Deputy Secretary General	Mmasekgoa Masire-Mwamba
Other attendees
South Sudan	Widow of John Garang	Rebecca Nyandeng De Mabior
United States	Special Guest of the President-Elect	Jesse Jackson
Zambia	Former Presidents	Rupiah Banda; Kenneth Kaunda
