= 2013 Kenyan presidential election petition =

Kenya Presidential Election Petition, 2013
- Court: Supreme Court of Kenya
- Full case name: Raila Odinga & 5 others v Independent Electoral & Boundaries Commission & 3 others [2013]

Court membership
- Judges sitting: The Hon. Justice Willy Mutunga (Chief Justice); Hon. Justice Philip Kiptoo Tunoi; Hon. Justice Jackton Boma Ojwang; Hon. Justice Mohamed Khadhar Ibrahim; Hon. Justice Smokin Wanjala; Hon. Lady Justice Njoki Susanna Ndung'u

Case opinions
- Decision by: Unanimous
- Concurrence: 6
- Concur/dissent: 6/0
- Dissent: 0

The Kenya Presidential Election Petition of 2013 was an election petition aiming to declare the Kenya presidential election 2013 invalid. The Petition was filed at the Supreme Court of Kenya on 16 March 2013.

The Report of the Kriegler Commission on the crisis that followed the 2007 general election placed a special requirement of fiduciary duty on the Supreme Court of Kenya in relation to any matter alleging election fraud.

== Background ==
The main petitioner Raila Odinga in a press conference shortly after the election results were announced on 9 March, noted that the election had been marred by massive and significant alleged failures of the biometric voter registration (BVR) kits, the electronic voter identification system generated by these kits, the results transmission or 'tallying' system and the results presentation system. In all, the petitioner's claim was that the manual tallying could not be relied on, and therefore the technical evidence of the IEBC needed to undergo scrutiny.

After the 2007 general election and the chaos that followed, the report by the Kriegler Commission urged Kenya came up with a new constitution that was promulgated on 27 August 2010 that detailed on how any future dispute concerning election will be solved. The major avenue of this was to set up Supreme court that would hear all issues regarding presidential election and make a ruling. Its decision is final.

== Judges ==
The justices of the Supreme Court of Kenya would hear and determine the petition following the election, and any decision required a simple majority to pass. consisted of six justices at the time:

- Chief Justice & President Of The Supreme Court Of Kenya: The Hon. Justice (Dr.) Willy Mutunga
- Hon. Mr. Justice Philip Kiptoo Tunoi
- Hon. Justice (Prof.) Jackton Boma Ojwang
- Hon. Mr. Justice Mohamed Khadhar Ibrahim
- Hon. Justice (Dr.) Smokin Wanjala
- Hon. Lady Justice Njoki Susanna Ndung'u

== Petitioners ==
There were three petitions filed at the Supreme Court for determination:

- The first sought to determine what constituted a rejected vote, and whether rejected (spoilt) votes should have been counted when determining the total number of votes cast. The petitioners were Dennis Itumbi, Moses Kuria and Florence Sergon, represented in court by Lawyer Njoroge Regeru
- The Second sought to invalidate the results of the election based on the fact that there were numerous irregularities in voter registration, electronic voter identification and tallying. It was filed by the Africa Centre for Open Governance (AfriCOG), who were represented by lawyer Kethi Kilonzo.
- The Third sought to invalidate the results of the Presidential election, alleging that massive electoral fraud and malpractices occurred that helped Uhuru Kenyatta to win. It was filed by Raila Odinga, who was represented by lawyer George Oraro.

All above cases were consolidated and heard at the same time.

The respondents were:

- The Independent Electoral and Boundaries Commission (IEBC) represented by Ahmednasir Abdullahi.
- Ahmed Issack Hassan as a returning officer for the presidential election
- Uhuru Kenyatta as the beneficiary of flawed presidential election as president elect, represented by Fred Ngatia.
- William Ruto as the beneficiary of flawed presidential election as deputy president elect represented by Katwa Kigen.

Other organisations and entities that appealed for inclusion in the case as amicus curiae:

- Attorney General of Kenya - Prof Githu Muigai - Appeal approved
- Katiba Institute - Prof Yash Pal Ghai - Appeal declined
- Law Society of Kenya - Appeal declined

== Pre-Trial Hearing ==
During the status conference judges decided on major issues brought up by the lawyers.

The court rejected 900 pages which formed the Second Affidavit of Raila Odinga's position on the basis that it amounted to new evidence, which is not admissible under The Kenyan Constitution. Senior Counsel, George Oraro for Raila Odinga, argued it was not new evidence, but instead was 'further and better particulars', giving precise details of each allegation as was presented. The court ultimately declined, wrongly claiming that the affidavit was filed after the deadline for submission of evidence had passed. The reality and Court records show that the Affidavit was correctly filed and on time.

The petitioners' appeal to for an audit of the ICT system of the IEBC was also declined, with the court citing that the process would be time consuming. The 900 pages included the evidence of Raj Pal Senna marked "RO6" which outlined the results of the forensic investigation of the IT used in the Kenyan Elections 2013 and which findings were later published as the OpCo Report

The court also rejected AfriCOG request that IEBC produce all register that were used to identify voter at polling stations, citing that the time limit of 7 days to hear and rule the case would not be enough for this.

The court had also rejected the Law Society of Kenya and the Katiba Institute's appeal for inclusion as amicus curiae, as they were deemed to be partisan to Uhuru Kenyatta and William Ruto. Attorney-General Githu Muigai's appeal was approved.

== Case Hearing ==
AfriCOG's petition sought to demonstrate that constitutional and legal safeguards on the election process were so breached that the accuracy and legitimacy of the electoral outcomes was laid open to question. They sought to demonstrate that the electoral process was neither accountable nor transparent and its results therefore could not be verified.

Raila Odinga's petition sought to bring attention to the series of technological failures that cast doubt on the provisional results as tallied by the IEBC, as well as the breakdown of BVR kits on polling day. He also alleged that massive electoral fraud and malpractices occurred that helped his opponent to win.

During the case closing Lawyer for IEBC chairman Ahmednasir Abdullahi coined the term Raila Doctrine that state that an election can never be free and/ or fair unless Raila Odinga wins the election;

== Case ruling ==
The case was decided unanimously by the six sitting judges.

- The elections were indeed conducted in compliance with the Constitution and the law.
- That Uhuru Kenyatta and William Ruto were validly elected
- That rejected votes ought not to have been included in calculating the final tallies in favour of each presidential candidate.

The final judgement was issued on 16 April 2013.

The court ruled that all members were to pay for their own costs.

== Aftermath ==
After the Supreme Court gave its ruling on 30 March, both Uhuru and Raila accepted the ruling.

In a televised speech, Uhuru said that "judgment upholding his election as the fourth President of Kenya is a victory to all Kenyans". He also said that his administration will be an all-inclusive one and nobody should feel isolated. He further extended an olive branch to his major competitor, Raila Odinga.

In his concession speech, Raila said 'Kenya is more important and urged Uhuru to reunite all Kenyans and uphold constitutionalism'. He disagreed with the court but he also noted that their decision is final.

Following the determination of the case, the swearing in ceremony of Uhuru Kenyatta as President and William Ruto as Deputy President was held on 9 April 2013 in accordance with Article 141(2)(b) of the constitution of Kenya:

In case the Supreme Court upholds the victory of the president-elect, the swearing in will take place on "the first Tuesday following the seventh day following the date on which the court renders a decision declaring the election to be valid.",

The event was held at Kasarani Stadium.

== Further developments ==
The full report of forensic investigation carried out by Raj Pal Senna was published after the petition.

The report detailed how a forensic investigation of the technical evidence of the IEBC was carried out in relation to the technology deployed during the Kenyan Elections. In particular a forensic investigation was carried out on claims made by the IEBC that the electronic voter identification kits failed, the server used to handle transmission of election results overloaded and subsequently crashed, and that the database of results crashed. The affidavits of the IEBC and of Uhuru Kenyatta during the petition were similarly subjected to forensic scrutiny. The findings of this investigation were documented in a witness statement known as "Witness Statement R06"

This inspired a documentary called "50%+1 - The Inside Story" by Kenya Television Network journalists John-Allan Namu and Mohammed Ali.

Following the investigation by Raj Pal Senna and the legal notices filed by a voter George Nyongesa, the IEBC CEO James Oswago was arrested and prosecuted over the acquisition of the kits used for biometric voter registration.
