= Mohamed Warsame =

Kenyan judge

The Honourable Mohamed Abdulahi Warsame

Justice of the Supreme Court of Kenya
- Incumbent
- Assumed office 7 May 2026
- Nominated by: Judicial Service Commission
- Appointed by: William Ruto
- Preceded by: Mohamed Khadhar Ibrahim

Judge at the Court of Appeal of Kenya
- In office 2012 – 7 May 2026

Judge at the High Court
- In office 2003–2012

Personal details
- Born: Bulla Mpya estate, Mandera Town, Kenya
- Education: Kenya School of Law (Postgraduate diploma, 1993); University of Nairobi (Bachelor of Laws Degree, 1992)

Mohamed Abdulahi Warsame is a Kenyan jurist who serves as a Judge of the Supreme Court of Kenya. Appointed in May 2026, he previously served as a Judge of the Court of Appeal for over a decade.

== Early life and education ==
Warsame was born in Mandera Town, Kenya. He obtained a Bachelor of Laws degree from the University of Nairobi and a Postgraduate Diploma in Law from the Kenya School of Law.

== Legal career ==
Prior to becoming a judge, Warsame practiced as an advocate, first working at Anjarwalla Abdulhussein & Company Advocates (now known as ALN Kenya | Anjarwalla & Khanna (A&K)) and later founding Warsame and Company Advocates where he rose from litigation head to sole partner.

=== High Court ===
Warsame was appointed as a Judge of the High Court in 2003, serving in the Commercial, Criminal and Judicial Review divisions. He was the first presiding judge of the Judicial Review Division of the High Court under the 2010 Constitution.

=== Court of Appeal ===
In 2012, Warsame was elevated to the Court of Appeal. He became known for his efficiency and high case clearance rate. While at the appellate court, he was twice successfully elected by his peers to represent them as a Commissioner at the Judicial Service Commission (JSC) serving in that role from 2014. He was a member of the Finance and Administration and Human Resource Committees of the JSC.

=== Supreme Court ===
Supreme Court Justice Mohamed Khadhar Ibrahim died in December 2025, leaving a vacancy at the Court. The Judicial Service Commission announced the vacancy on 13 January and advertised it on 28 January. Five of the six applicants for the position were shortlisted and publicly interviewed on 28 and 29 April, with Warsame being nominated after the interviews, Chief Justice Martha Koome referred to him as having "professional competence, unimpeachable integrity, fairness, sound judgment, a genuine and demonstrable commitment to the rule of law and public service." He was appointed by the president on 5 May and sworn in on 7 May at State House, Nairobi.

=== Other roles ===
He is a member of the Kenya Magistrates and Judges Association (KMJA),Commonwealth Magistrates' and Judges' Association and the Law Society of Kenya. He was the Chairman of the Community Service and Probation Committee.

== Personal life ==
Warsame is married with four children. He gained the nickname "Coach" due to his athletism in volleyball.
