= Smokin Wanjala =

Kenyan lawyer and associate justice

The Hon. Justice Smokin C. Wanjala

Justice of the Supreme Court of Kenya
- Incumbent
- Assumed office June 2012
- Appointed by: Mwai Kibaki

Personal details
- Born: 22 June 1960 (age 65)

Smokin Wanjala is a Kenyan lawyer and a justice of the Supreme Court of Kenya. He holds a Ph.D. in law from the University of Ghent, Belgium. He also holds a Master of Laws degree from the Columbia University in the United States and a Bachelor of Laws (LLB) degree from the University of Nairobi. Wanjala lectured at the University of Nairobi for 15 years, teaching international law, international human rights law, land law and criminal law.

== Anti-corruption work ==
Wanjala served as a deputy director in charge of prevention of the now defunct Kenya Anti-Corruption Commission. He was appointed to the position on 9 September 2004 for a period of five years and was responsible for Research, Policy and Preventive Service. He resigned on 18 September 2009 due to public outcry following the irregular reappointment alongside his boss Aaron Ringera and fellow deputy director Fatuma Sichale by President Mwai Kibaki.

Wanjala regularly lectured at the International Anti-Corruption Academy (IACA) in Laxenburg, Austria.

== Appointment to the Supreme Court ==
In June 2012, he was among five justices nominated to the inaugural bench of the Supreme Court of Kenya by the Judicial Service Commission (Kenya) which had interviewed 25 applicants.

== Supreme Court career ==
When the first round of the presidential election took place on March 4, 2013, it resulted in the two frontrunners, Uhuru of Jubilee and Raila of CORD, clinching 50.6% and 43.7% of the vote respectively. Uhuru Kenyatta was declared the president-elect of Kenya by the Independent Electoral and Boundaries Commission. Raila Odinga challenged this in the Supreme Court of Kenya. Wanjala was one of the six judges who dismissed the petition on March 30, 2013. The highly awaited verdict, given amid great tension in the country, was rendered in favour of Uhuru Kenyatta and was unanimous.

In September 2017, he was one of four judges who voted to nullify President Uhuru Kenyatta's win in the August 2017 presidential election.

On September 5, he was one of the judges of the Supreme Court Of Kenya to uphold the election of Dr. William Samoei Ruto as the president-elect of Kenya where Raila (the Petitioner) was against his win.

== Bibliography ==
- The Anatomy of Corruption in Kenya: Legal, Political and Socio-economic Perspectives (ISBN 9966960236)

== See also ==
- Supreme Court of Kenya
