= Kalpana Rawal =

Kenyan judge

Deputy Chief Justice & Vice President of the Supreme Court of Kenya
- In office June 3, 2013 – 14 June 2016
- Appointed by: President of the Republic of Kenya

Personal details
- Born: January 15, 1946 (age 80) Bhuj, India

Kalpana Hasmukhrai Rawal (born 15 January 1946 in Bhuj, India) is a Kenyan-Asian lawyer and the former Deputy Chief Justice and Vice President of the Supreme Court of Kenya. She was sworn in on June 3, 2013 as the Deputy Chief Justice of Kenya in a ceremony presided over by the President of Kenya and the Chief Justice. After a protracted case on the question of the retirement age of Judges who were appointed under the old Constitution of Kenya, the Supreme Court delivered a Ruling which effectively set the retirement age at 70 years, sending the Deputy Chief Justice and one other Supreme Court Judge who had reached 70 on retirement.

== Education and early career ==
Rawal holds a Bachelor of Arts degree, and Bachelors and Master of Laws in constitutional and administrative law. She received her LLB and LLM degrees in India, where she practised for three years under the tutelage of P. N. Bhagwati who later became the 17th Chief Justice of India.

She had a general practice until 1999 when she was appointed a commissioner of assize, and judge of the High Court thereafter.

== Judicial career ==
Rawal has over 40 years experience in the legal profession and as at May 2011 had served as a judge for 11 years most of which was in Nairobi. A year later, the mother of two sons was appointed a Judge of the High Court of Kenya, and she consequently stopped working at her law firm which is still operational. During her tenure, she reformed each of the divisions in which she was appointed – Civil, Criminal, Family, Environmental and Land Law – by reducing severe backlog and improving the expeditious disposal of cases.

In April, 2010, Rawal was appointed the Liaison Judge for Kenya making her a member of the International Hague Network of Judges and the Chief Justice also appointed her to assist the International Criminal Court (ICC) to take evidence of security officers in respect of the investigation into 2007/2008 Post Election Violence.

In 2011, while still at the High Court, she delivered a judgment against the Ethics and Anti-Corruption Commission, barring it from confiscating assets of Stanley Amuti, former National Water Conservation and Pipeline Corporation finance boss, to recover Sh140 million.

In the same year, she was among nine applicants interviewed for the position of Chief Justice of Kenya by the Judicial Service Commission but she lost to former Chief Justice Willy Mutunga.

Opportunity came knocking on February 22, 2013 when the Judicial Service Commission nominated her for the position of Deputy Chief Justice.

In 2012, Rawal was awarded the Elder of the Order of the Burning Spear by President Uhuru Kenyatta.

=== Chief Justice interviews ===
In May 2011, she was among nine applicants interviewed for the position Chief Justice of Kenya by the Judicial Service Commission (Kenya). She however lost to the then eventual appointee Chief Justice Willy Mutunga.

=== 2012 Kenya Police helicopter crash inquiry ===
Justice Rawal led the judicial inquiry into the June 2012 Kenya Police helicopter crash that killed all six people on board including Minister George Saitoti and Assistant Minister Orwa Ojode.

=== Vetting Board decision ===
In September 2012, the Kenya Judges and Magistrates Vetting Board in its fourth Determination declared Rawal fit for office. It had earlier delayed its decision as she was among judges hearing a national interest case to determine on the date of the next Kenyan general elections.

== Deputy chief justice nomination ==
Following the resignation of Nancy Barasa, Rawal applied for the vacant position of Deputy Chief Justice advertised by the Judicial Service Commission (JSC) on 9 November 2012. The JSC however re-advertised because it was dissatisfied by the number of applicants. The position subsequently attracted applications from 17 women and one man. She was among five shortlisted for the position.

On 22 February 2013, the JSC announced that after completing the interviews it had nominated Court of Appeal Judge Kalpana Rawal. She was successfully vetted by Parliament, and then appointed by the President as the Deputy Chief Justice and Vice President of the Supreme Court.

== Retirement ==
Having been born in January 1946, Lady Justice Kalpana Rawal was required to retire from the Supreme Court upon reaching 70 in January 2016 in line with Article 167(1) of the Constitution of Kenya. However, when the Judicial Service Commission served her with a retirement notice, she launched a protracted case insisting that she should leave office at 74 years since she was first appointed as a Judge under the old Constitution of Kenya which set the retirement age of Judges at 74. Both the High Court and the Court of Appeal confirmed the retirement age as 70, but she filed a further appeal before her colleagues in the Supreme Court who delivered a ruling which effectively confirmed the retirement age as 70. She was therefore honourably retired on 14 June 2016. During her 40 years as a legal professional, Rawal played a big role and paved the way for many women in the justice system. Rawal’s pivotal role has not gone unnoticed and she was awarded the Elder of the Order of Burning Spear (EBS) by President Uhuru Kenyatta.

== Personal life ==
Her father was a judge of the High Court of India, while her grandfather served as a law minister in India.

== See also ==
- First women lawyers around the world
- Supreme Court of Kenya
