= Njoki Susanna Ndung'u =

Kenyan judge

The Honourable Njoki Susanna Ndungu
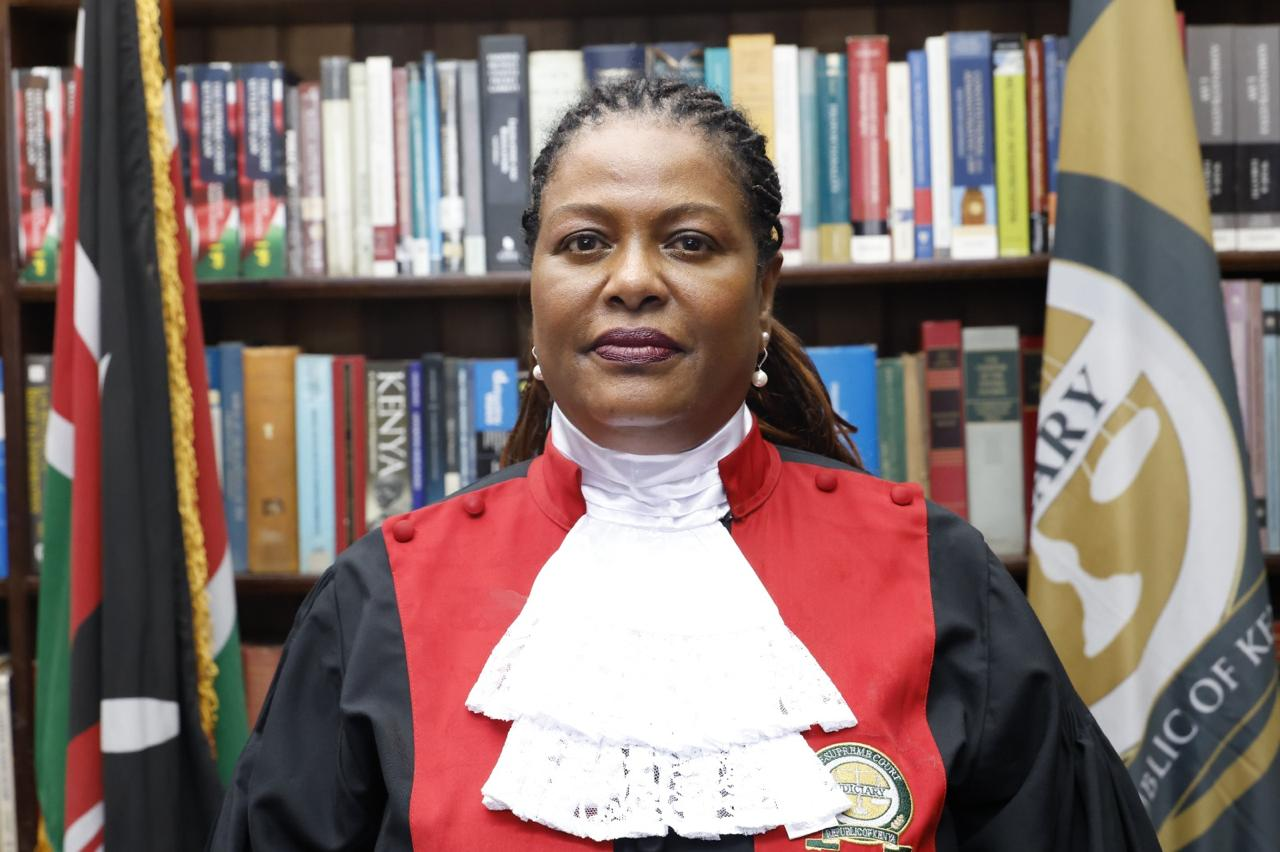

Justice of the Supreme Court of Kenya
- Incumbent
- Assumed office 26th August 2011

Personal details
- Born: 1 January 1966 (age 60)

Njoki Susanna Ndungu (born 1966) is a Kenyan lawyer and a justice of the Supreme Court of Kenya.

== Early life and education ==
Njoki is an alumna of The Kenya High School (Class of 1980/82), She holds a Bachelor of Laws (LLB) from University of Nairobi , a Master of Laws (LLM) in human rights and civil liberties from the University of Leicester in the United Kingdom and a Diploma on Women's Rights from the World University Service in Austria.

== Career ==
Her career has focused on human rights, gender justice, and constitutional development, spanning civil society, international organizations, Parliament, and the judiciary. Ndungu began her career as a State Counsel in the Office of the Attorney General (1989–1993). She was also a former Member of the Pan-African Parliament, where she represented Kenya. From 1995, she worked as the National Protection Officer at the United Nations High Commissioner for Refugees (UNHCR), and a Political Analyst in Conflict Management at the African Union formerly OAU.

== Civil society engagement/activism ==
Between 1993- 1995 She worked as a Programme Officer at the Institute for Education in Democracy (IED),focusing on democratic processes. She was an active member of Women in Law and Development in Africa (WiLDAF), where she advocated for women’s legal rights During the constitutional review process leading to the 2010 Constitution, FIDA–Kenya, with contributions from Njoki and other women’s rights advocates, successfully lobbied for the inclusion of provisions on gender equality, affirmative action, and protection against discrimination. Following the post-election violence in Kenya after the 2007–2008 general elections, Ndungu testified before the United States Congress in 2008 as part of her civil society advocacy work. In her testimony, she highlighted the impact of electoral violence on women and communities, and called for stronger international support for democratic reforms and human rights protections in Kenya.

== Parliamentary service ==
National Assembly of Kenya

Ndungu served as a Member of the 9th Parliament of Kenya-nominated member of Parliament between 2003 and 2007 and served on the following Parliamentary committees:

- Departmental Committee on Administration of Justice and Legal Affairs
- Departmental Committee on Defense and Foreign Affairs
- Select Committee on the Constitution of Kenya
- Committee on Conflict and International Cooperation (PAP)

Njoki served as a member of the Committee of Experts that drafted the Constitution of Kenya, which was promulgated in 2010.

== Key Contributions to Women's Rights ==
- Sexual Offences Act 2006

She was the architect and mover of the ‘Sexual Offenses Bill, 2006’ which was eventually passed as the Sexual Offences Act 2006.

- Maternity and Paternity Leave: She successfully moved amendments to the Employment Act 2007, securing paid leave for both parents.
- Affirmative Action: Pushed for the Political Parties Act 2007, which introduced measures to increase women’s participation in politics.
- Ndungu has been a strong advocate for women’s rights in Kenya. In addition to sponsoring the Sexual Offences Act (2006), she lobbied for the zero-rating of sanitary towels to make them more affordable and accessible to women and girls.

== Awards and honours ==
In 2006, Njoki Ndungu was named the United Nations Person of the Year in Kenya for her contributions to constitutional reform and human rights. That same year, she received the International Commission of Jurists (Kenya Section) Jurist of the Year Award. She has also been recognized with presidential commendations, including the Elder of the Burning Spear (EBS) in 2006 and later the Chief of the Burning Spear (CBS).

== Supreme Court Judge interviews ==
In June 2011, she was among 5 justices nominated to the Supreme Court of Kenya by the Judicial Service Commission (Kenya) which had interviewed 25 applicants. On 26 August 2011, she was appointed as a Judge of the Supreme Court of Kenya, assuming office on that date.

== Supreme Court career ==
When the first round of the presidential election took place on March 4, 2013. Uhuru Kenyatta was declared the president-elect of Kenya by the Independent Electoral and Boundaries Commission. Raila Odinga challenged this in the Supreme Court of Kenya. She was one of the six judges who dismissed the petition on March 30, 2013.

Justice Njoki Susanna Ndungu is noted for her detailed dissenting opinions in the Supreme Court of Kenya, particularly in high-profile constitutional and electoral cases. Her dissents have been widely discussed in legal scholarship and public discourse for their emphasis on constitutional interpretation and the protection of rights. At the conclusion of the 2017 presidential election petition, Lady Justice Njoki Ndungu rendered a dissenting opinion alongside Justice Jacktone Boma Ojwang, citing no evidence to announce the elections as null and void. In the 2022 Building Bridges Initiative (BBI) judgment, she agreed with the majority, in rejecting the application of the basic structure doctrine and holding that the Constitution of Kenya, 2010 does not contain unamendable provisions. She however dissented from the majority, arguing that the President, as a citizen, could initiate constitutional amendments through the popular initiative process. In the Senate Advisory Opinion Reference No. 2 of 2013, she dissented from the majority, holding that once the Division of Revenue Bill - that divides revenue between the national and county levels of Government - is introduced in the National Assembly, Senate has no role to play. In the Judges and Magistrates Vetting Board v. Justice Mohammed Warsame matter, she dissented from the majority, holding that members of the Judicial Service Commission (JSC) elected under Article 171(2)(b), (c), (d), (f), and (g) of the Constitution were subject to parliamentary vetting and approval before appointment. In her view, parliamentary approval was necessary to check presidential powers of appointment, to ensure compliance with Chapter Six on leadership and integrity, and to uphold national values under Article 10 and Article 250(4) of the Constitution.

== Additional Responsibilities ==
In the Judiciary of Kenya, she has been on the lead in the development of the Employee Protection Unit which oversights a complaint mechanism for sexual harassment complaints and also the Gender and Inclusion unit which implements policies on gender, diversity and affirmative action for employees

On 9 January 2026, she was elected unopposed as the Supreme Court Representative to the Judicial Service Commission (JSC).

== Other Contributions ==
Despite her role as a Supreme Court Judge, she remains actively involved in human rights through:

- Gender Violence Recovery Centre (GVRC): Serves for the last 25 years as the Chair of the Board of Trustees at Nairobi Women’s Hospital which provides free medical services for victims of SGBV.
- Big Sister Programme: has Mentored over 250,000 teenage girls in schools, focusing on sexual and reproductive health and career growth in education.
- Public Advocacy: Continues to advocate for the increased representation of women in public office and to raise awareness on constitutional and human rights questions through public lectures and conferences.

== Publications ==
Ndungu has written on political and social issues in Kenya. Her article, "Kenya: The December 2007 Election Crisis," was published in Mediterranean Quarterly in December 2008, offering her perspective on the causes and the consequences of the post-election violence in the 2007/2008 general election, the effort by the international community including, the African Union and recommendations to prevent a reoccurrence of election violence in Kenya .

== See also ==
- Supreme Court of Kenya
- Africa is a Woman's Name - a documentary about three women, including Ndungu
