= Philomena Mwilu =

Deputy Chief Justice and Vice-President of the Supreme Court of Kenya

The Hon. Lady Justice Philomena Mbete Mwilu MGH
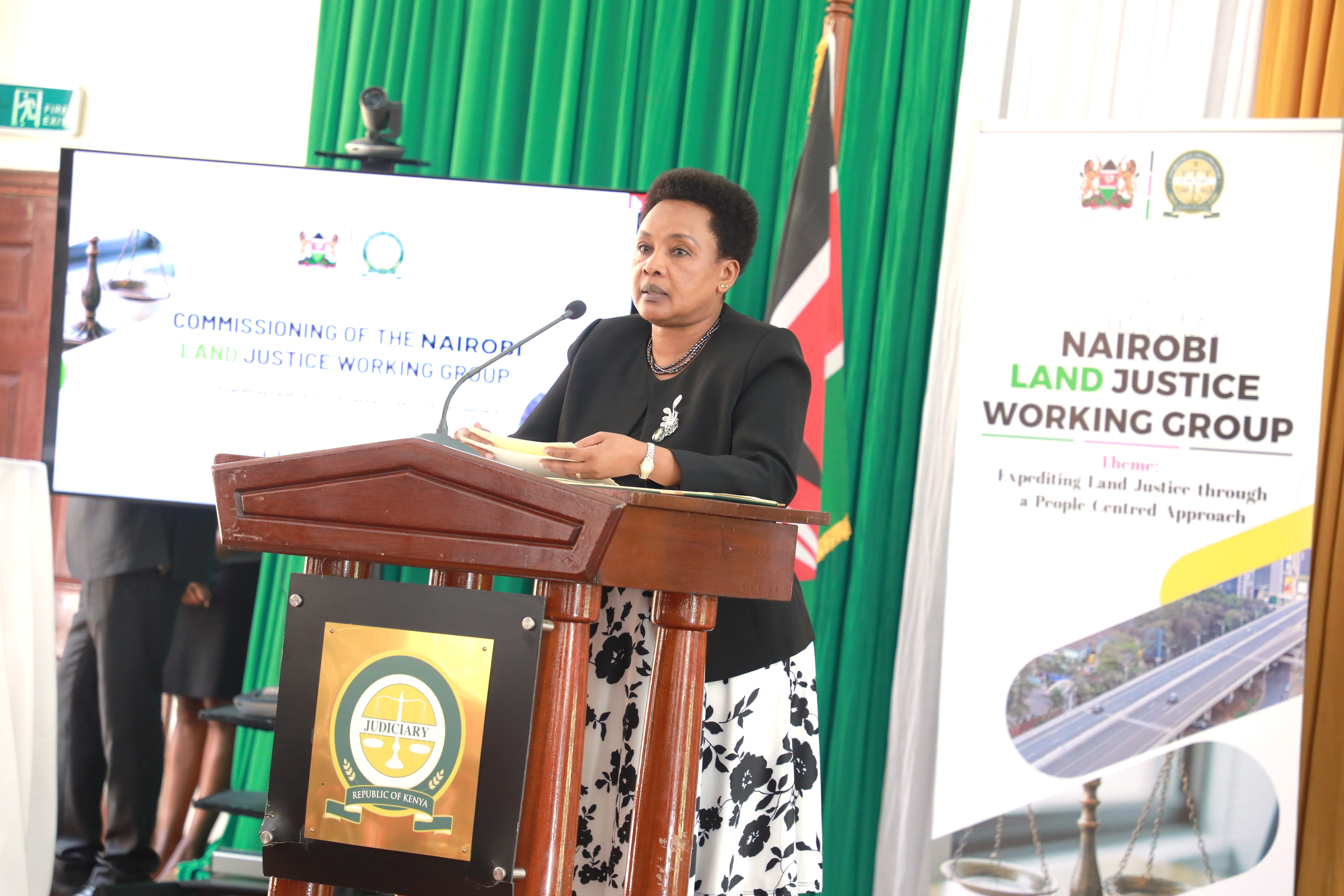
- Lady Justice Philomena Mwilu giving a speech at an event in Nairobi

3rd Deputy Chief Justice of Kenya
- Incumbent
- Assumed office 28 October 2016
- Appointed by: Uhuru Kenyatta
- Preceded by: Kalpana Rawal

Personal details
- Born: Philomena Mbete Mwilu; 15 April 1957 (age 69) Colony and Protectorate of Kenya
- Education: University of Nairobi (LLM); University of Nairobi (PhD)
- Occupation: Deputy Chief Justice of Kenya
- Profession: Lawyer

Philomena Mbete Mwilu (born 15 April 1957) is a Kenyan lawyer and judge, who has served as the Deputy Chief Justice of Kenya and Vice President of the Supreme Court of Kenya since 28 October 2016. Following the retirement of Chief Justice David Maraga, and before Martha Koome was appointed as the Chief Justice, she served as Acting Chief Justice and President of the Supreme Court of Kenya from 11 January 2021 to 19 May 2021, making her the first woman to hold that office.

== Personal life ==
Philomena Mwilu was born on 15 April 1957 in the present day Makueni County, Kaiti division, Kilala location. She is a mother of four children. Philomena Mwilu is a spouse to Amos Wako, former attorney general and senator for Busia County

== Background and education ==
She studied at Alliance Girls High School. She then proceeded to study law at the University of Nairobi, graduating with a Bachelor of Laws. In 1984, she was admitted as an advocate of the High Court of Kenya. She returned to the University of Nairobi for a Master of Laws Degree, graduating in 2018.

== Early legal career ==
Justice Philomena Mbete Mwilu's long legal career spans over 35 years. She began by practicing law in the firm of "Muthoga Gaturu & Company" in 1984 and later transferred to "Mutunga & Company Advocates". In June 1991 she was appointed senior legal manager at Jubilee Insurance Company Limited, serving in that capacity until 1997.

From 1999 until 2001, she was the Board secretary at the "Electricity Regulatory Board" of Kenya, and later, from 2006 until 2007, she served as the deputy chairperson of the Energy Tribunal. In 2007, she served as a director of the board of Nairobi Water and Sewerage Company and later as chair of the Legal and Human Resource Committees of the board, prior to her joining the Kenya Judiciary.

== Judicial career ==
She was appointed a High Court judge in 2008, first serving in the Commercial Court Division in Nairobi. She was then moved to the High Court in Eldoret. From Eldoret, she was transferred back to Nairobi where she served at the Criminal Division of the High Court. She was appointed the head of the Environment and Land Division of the High Court in January 2012. In November 2012, she was appointed as a Justice of the Kenya Court of Appeal.

In October 2016, she was nominated to take the position of Deputy Chief Justice of Kenya, replacing Kalpana Rawal, who had attained the mandatory retirement age of 70. After interviewing Justice Mwilu and over 14 other nominees, the Judicial Services Commission selected Philomena Mbete Mwilu to become the next Deputy Chief Justice.

In May 2017, she was elected by fellow Judges of the Supreme Court as their representative in the Judicial Service Commission.

Lady Justice Mwilu was one of the judges who heard the 2017 presidential election petition, joining Chief Justice David Maraga as well as associate Justices Smokin Wanjala and Isaac Lenaola in nullifying President Kenyatta's win. When a petition was filed to stop the fresh election that was scheduled following the nullification of the August presidential election, she was one of the Judges who failed to show up in court to hear the petition, forcing Chief Justice Maraga to adjourn the hearing. Aside from the Chief Justice, only one of the remaining six judges was available for the hearing.

A day before the hearing, her official car had been shot at while driving through traffic, with her driver sustaining gunshot wounds.

=== Arrest and prosecution ===
In August 2018, Justice Mwilu was dramatically arrested at her offices in the Supreme Court Building and escorted to the headquarters of the Directorate of Criminal Investigations and later in the evening to court where she was charged with several offences relating to property and loan transactions with the Imperial Bank with had collapsed by then. It was alleged that she had been given unsecured loans by the bank which she failed to pay by taking advantage of her then office as Judge of the Court of Appeal, and that she had failed to pay property taxes to the Kenya Revenue Authority.

She lodged an objection to the criminal proceedings, claiming that as a judicial officer, any allegations of impropriety on her part were to be lodged with the Judicial Service Commission and not the ordinary courts.

A three-judge bench of the High Court delivered a judgment in her petition in May 2019, holding that even though concurrent proceedings could be lodged at the JSC and the criminal courts, the proceedings against the DCJ were flawed since the DCI had obtained evidence against her in an unlawful manner.

Immediately after the judgment, the Director of Public Prosecutions issued a statement condemning the decision, and promising to lodge an appeal with the Court of Appeal.

A week later, a petition seeking her removal from office was lodged with the Judicial Service Commission on which she sits as a representative of the Supreme Court.

The Director of Public Prosecutions, Noordin Haji lodged another petition before the Judicial Service Commission inviting the Commission to investigate her conduct. The Petition followed from the criminal prosecution that had been quashed by the High Court.

== Acting Chief Justice & President of the Supreme Court ==
When Chief Justice David Maraga went into mandatory retirement on 11 January 2021 on attaining the age of 70 as provided under Kenya's Constitution, Mwilu took over the leadership of the Judiciary as the Acting Chief Justice pending the recruitment of a substantive Chief Justice to replace Maraga. While Mwilu started acting as the Chief Justice on 13 December 2020 when Maraga went on terminal leave ahead of his retirement, the final official hand over of the instruments of power took place on 11 January 2021. She took office despite a case which was filed by an activist who argued that she should not be named the Acting Chief Justice while she was facing a court case on abuse of office and corruption.

Her term as Acting Chief Justice ended on 19 May 2021 following the appointment of Martha Koome as the 15th Chief Justice of Kenya.

== See also ==
- Judiciary of Kenya
- David Maraga
