= Mohamed Khadhar Ibrahim =

Kenyan lawyer and judge (1956–2025)

The Honourable Mohamed Khadhar Ibrahim CBS SCJ

Justice of the Supreme Court of Kenya
- In office 16 June 2012 – 17 Dec 2025
- Appointed by: Mwai Kibaki
- Succeeded by: Mohamed Warsame

Personal details
- Born: 1 January 1956
- Died: 17 December 2025 (aged 69) Nairobi, Kenya
- Resting place: Kariokor Muslim Cemetery
- Education: Bachelor of Laws Degree, University of Nairobi; Diploma, Kenya School of Law

Mohamed Khadhar Ibrahim (1 January 1956 – 17 December 2025) was a Kenyan lawyer and a justice of the Supreme Court of Kenya.

== Supreme Court judge interviews ==
In June 2012, he was among five Justices nominated to the Supreme Court of Kenya by the Judicial Service Commission which had interviewed 25 applicants.

== Supreme Court career ==
When the first round of the presidential election took place on 4 March 2013. Uhuru Kenyatta was declared the president-elect of Kenya by the Independent Electoral and Boundaries Commission. Raila Odinga challenged this in the Supreme Court of Kenya. He was one of the six judges who dismissed the petition on 30 March 2013.

On 16 June 2016, Willy Mutunga who had served as the Chief Justice from June 2011 opted for early retirement and named Justice Ibrahim – the senior-most of the Judges left in the Court – as the acting President of the Supreme Court pending the recruitment of a substantive Chief Justice.

He served on the Judicial Service Commission from 2022.

== Vetting ==
After an initial round of vetting, the Kenya Judges and Magistrates Vetting Board found Justice Ibrahim unfit to serve due to a tendency to delay judgments and rulings while serving as a High Court judge. He was however found suitable to serve after fresh vetting.

== Death ==
Ibrahim died from a prolonged illness at Aga Khan University Hospital in Nairobi on 17 December 2025, aged 69.
