= The Village Market =

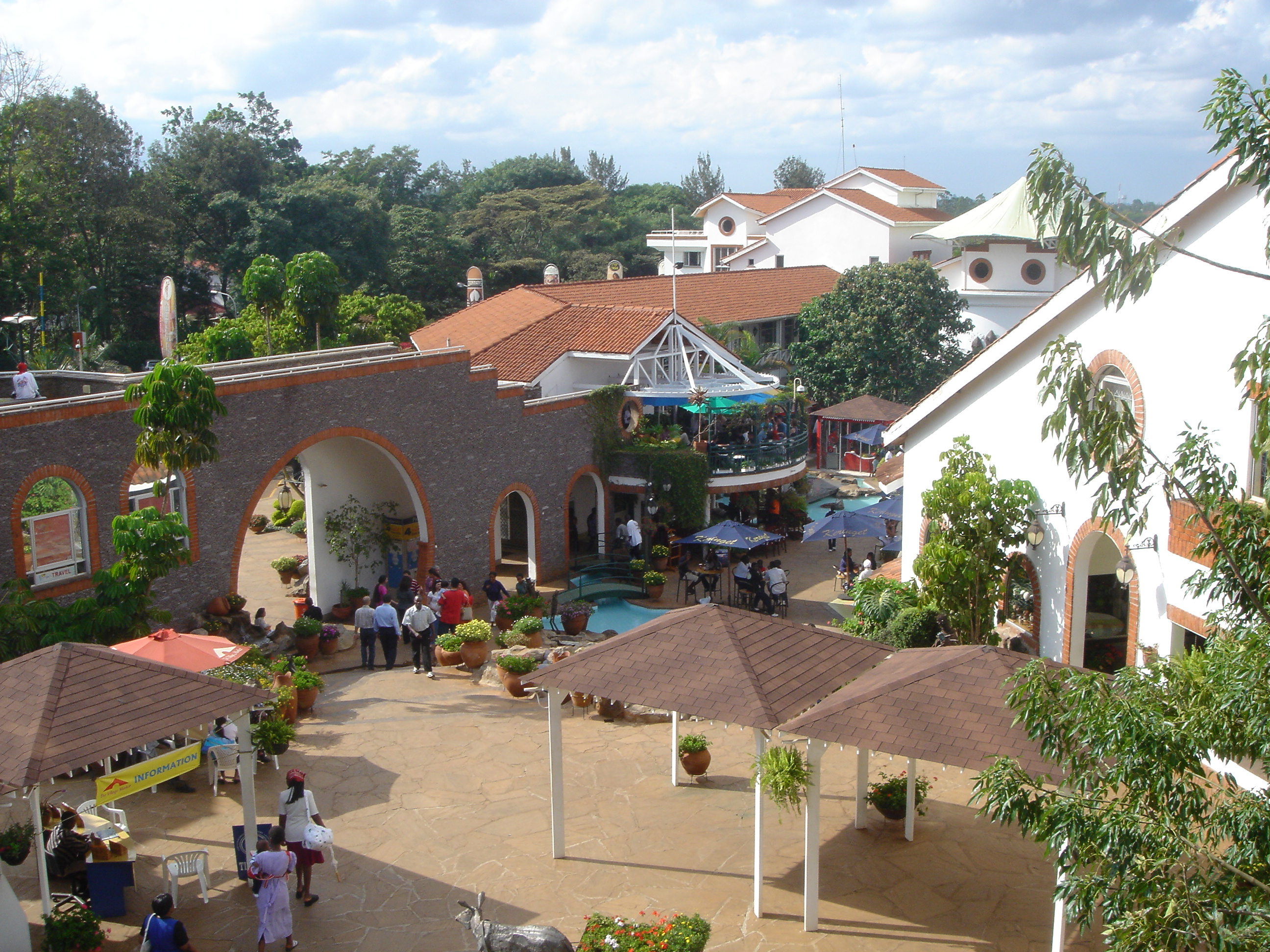
- The Village Market
- Location: Gigiri, Nairobi, Kenya
- Coordinates: 1°13′45″S 36°48′17″E
- Address: Limuru Road, Gigiri, Nairobi, P.O. Box 00621, Nairobi, Kenya
- Opened: 1995; 31 years ago
- Num. of stores: 150
- Floor area: 225,713 square feet (20,969.4 m^{2})
- Floors: 3
- Parking: 700 Onsite and other parking facilities around the complex.
- Website: www.villagemarket-kenya.com

The Village Market is a large shopping, recreation and entertainment complex in the Kenyan capital, Nairobi. It accommodates over 150 stores outlets covering 210,000 square feet (20,000 m^{2}) of retail space, 20,000 square feet (1,900 m^{2}) square feet of office space, in addition to recreation and entertainment facilities.

The Village Market is located in the Gigiri residential area which is about 6 miles (9.7 km) from Nairobi city center on Limuru Road. The complex is designed to resemble an open-air African market, including waterfalls, rivers, plants and gardens.

== History ==
In 1992, two Iranian brothers, Hamed and Mehraz Ehsani had the idea of constructing a shopping and recreation mall within Nairobi. Their objective was to provide a shopping and recreation experience for Gigiri's residents which include diplomats, expatriates and tourists living and/or working within the Nairobi's Diplomatic District and its immediate environs.

Construction began in April 1992 with a proposed 10 shops. Three years later they opened The Village Market's gates to the public. Today the complex covers over 225,713 square feet (20,969.4 m^{2}) of leasing space; three levels high, with more than 150 outlets, and was the first mall to introduce a food court to Kenya. The Village Market offers a variety of recreational facilities, that included a swimming and water slides area, bowling and mini-golf facility. In early 2014 these recreational areas were closed down to allow for expansion of the Mall. The current expansion will bring in over 70 new retail and service spaces and is expected to be complete in full by November 2016 to include a new three star business hotel with 215 rooms, a variety of conference areas and a pool.

== Inside the Village Market ==
The Village Market has outlets offering products and services of different categories. There are over 150 retail shops selling local and designer wear, fashion, accessories and footwear items falling within the lifestyle and speciality categories. Their anchor tenant was Nakumatt supermarket which was closed and will be soon replaced by A Majid Al Futtaim's Carrefour Supermarket.

The Village Market has an outdoor Food Court that offers a wide range of cuisines including traditional African fare. Within the Complex there are various other restaurants to choose from and these are open daily serving breakfast, lunch and dinner. The shopping mall also has on offer a variety of beauty, hair and salon services including the first M.A.C. store in Kenya, Refinery Grooming which is Nairobi's first new era Male Grooming Company that offers barbershop treatments for all hair types. A health and fitness center is also part of the Complex and offers yoga, barre and dance classes.

The Village Market has handicap accessible restrooms, a Baby Room for nursing mothers and a prayer area reserved for visitors and shoppers. The mall is accessible through 5 gates with 1225 on-site parking spaces including reserved handicap parking. There are more than five Customer Service desks which are located within the complex for shoppers, tenants and visitors seeking any information. The complex is open daily through the week and weekend as well as holidays from 7am to 11pm.

== Arts and crafts ==
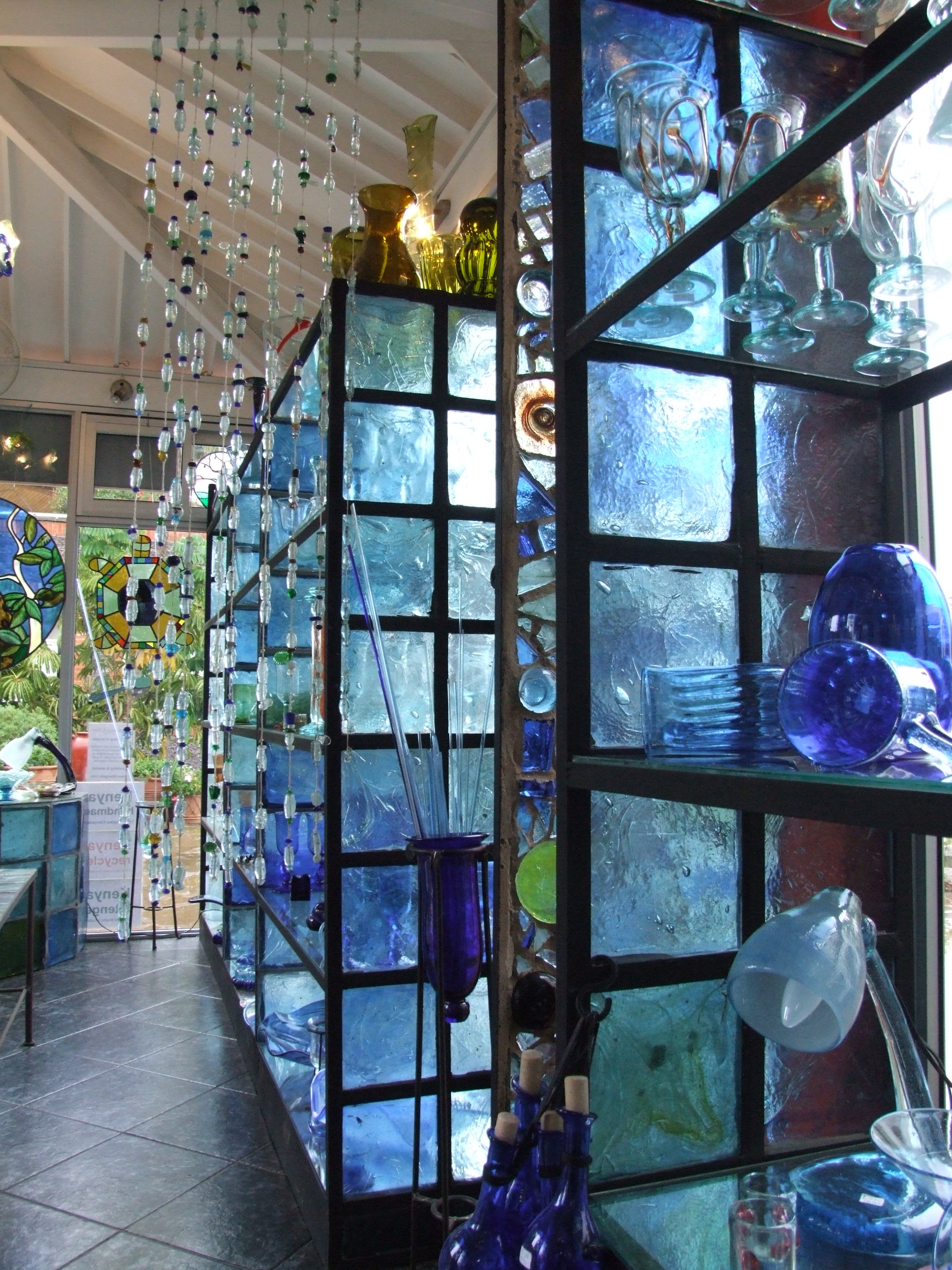
Glass art work in The Village Market

There are several outlets that specialize in African artifacts and other Kenyan crafts. Moreover, every Friday, the shopping center hosts the Maasai Market – a cultural bazaar that brings together around 400 artisans and craftsmen who specialize in an array of ethnic relics. The African pieces range from soapstone, fibers, wooden and iron sculptures and batiks and paintings.

== Recreation and entertainment ==
The mall used to have a Nu Metro Cinema hall, water slides, a mini golf course and bowling alleys, also known as Super Bowl. Village Market's recreation zones also hosted various supervised play areas for children. In 2019, the Village Market reopened their newly refurbished bowling alley The Village Bowl which is a modern 11 lane Brunswick facility. There is also a kid's recreational facility called Under The Sea, trampoline sessions at Ozone Trampoline Park and much more. During weekends, and holidays, The Village Market invites musicians, violinists, pianists and regular professional music bands for entertainment.

== Activities and events ==
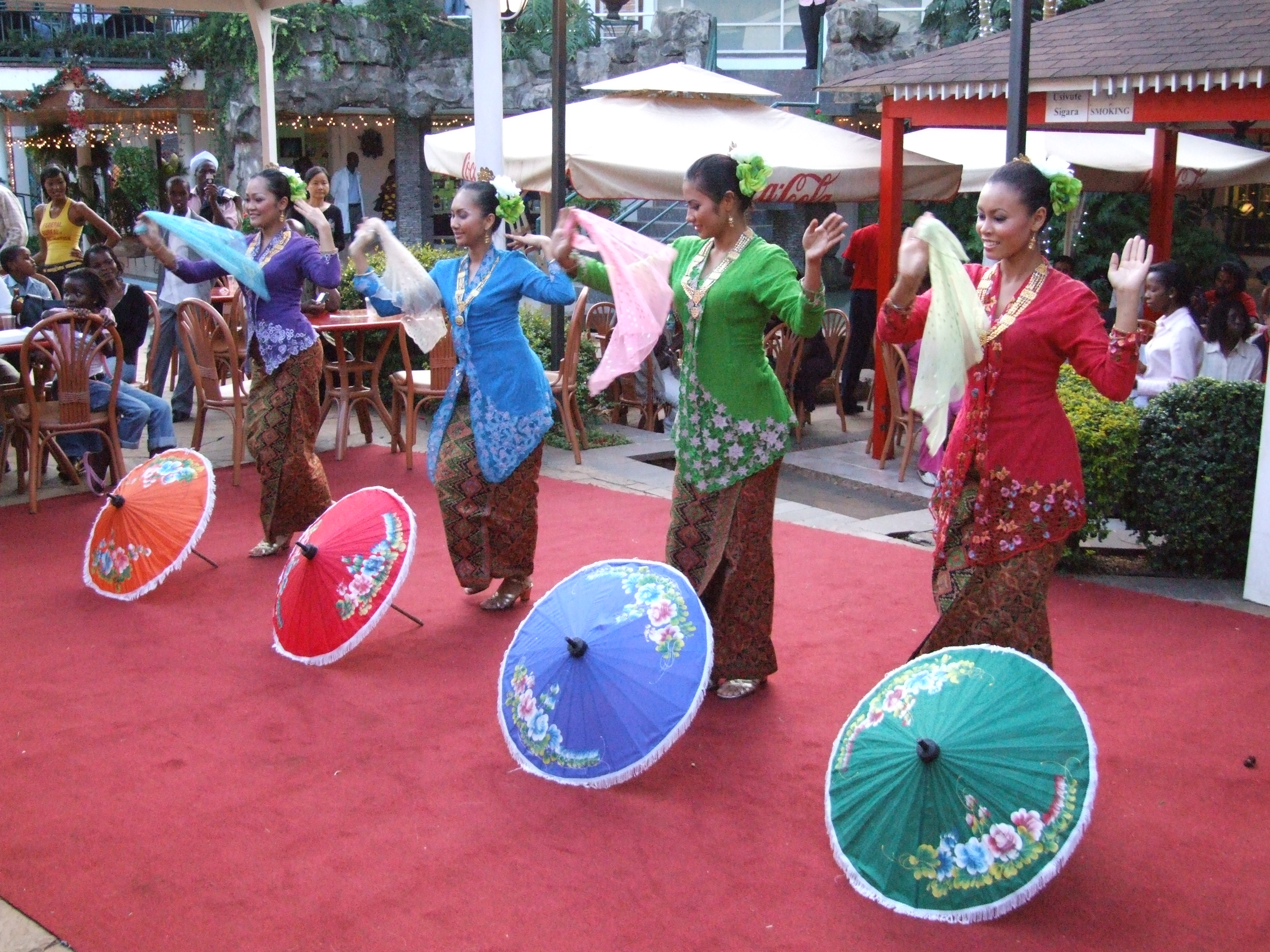
Traditional dance at The Village Market

The Village Market hosts many activities annually including weekly art exhibitions in the mall's exhibition halls. Ladies Day and Car Boot sale are among the activities and events held at the complex.

=== Regular promotions ===
The Village Market, frequently runs promotions to reward shoppers and visitors all through the year. The Bonus Card program is one of these promotions which is supposed to reward loyal shoppers with redeemable points.

=== Services ===
The Village Market provides other vital services. From health care to banking, the mall has 5 banks, and ATMs to boot and other related financial facilities. The complex also has a post office and a DHL center. There are also several tours and travel companies that make tour arrangements to various destinations. Also to be found in the complex is a driving school, a tyre center as well as a car dealership. The Village Market is also has a veterinary and dental clinic alongside a pharmacy and a dry cleaning service.

== Tribe – the Village Market hotel ==
A hotel room in The Village Market

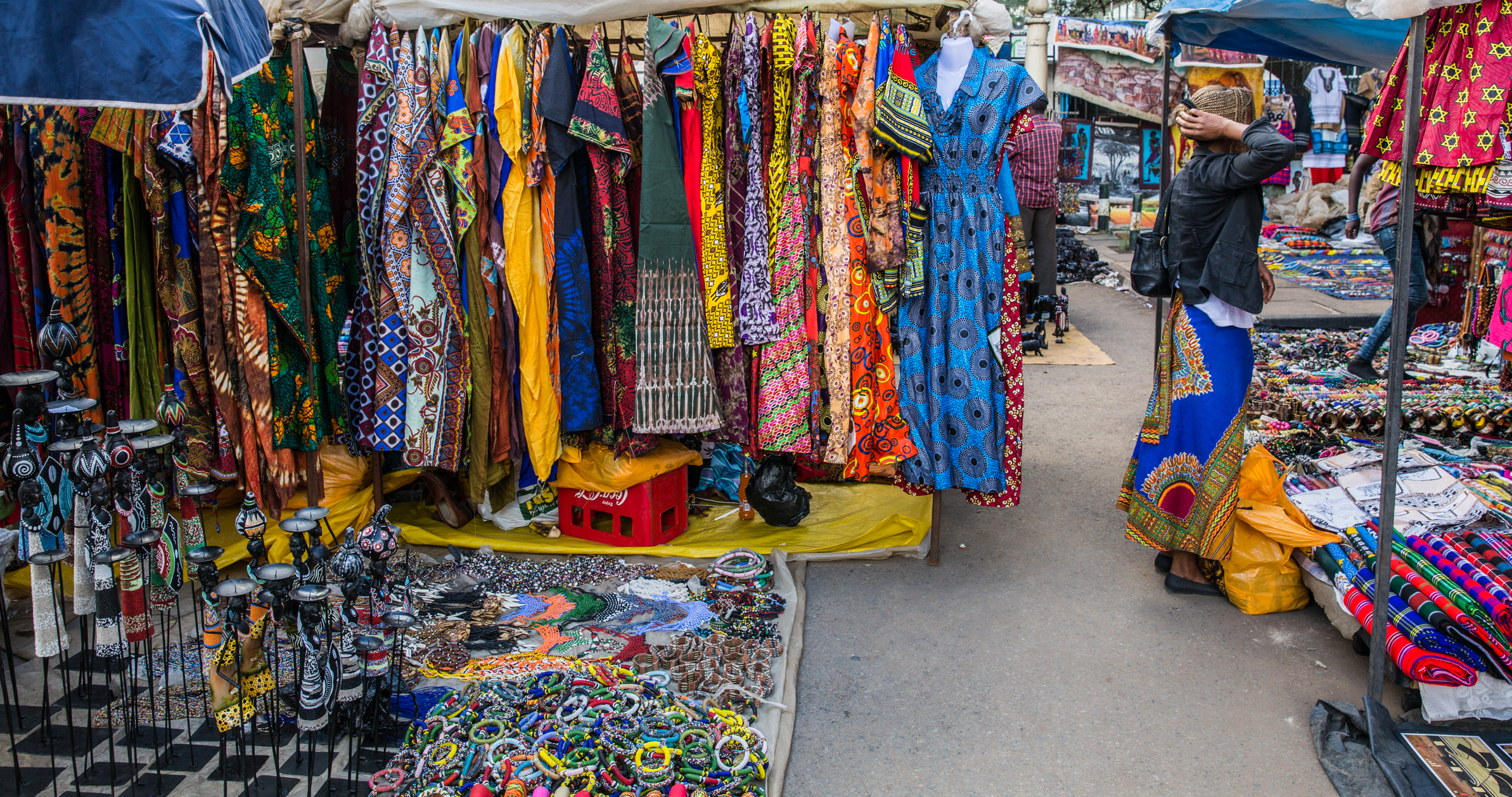
Maasai Market

Tribe is the Village Market hotel. Tribe is situated adjacent to the shopping center with 142 guestrooms and suites.

== See also ==
- List of shopping malls in Kenya
- Economy of Kenya
- List of shopping malls by country
- List of leading shopping streets and districts by city
- Baraza-Kerubo Village Market Incident
