= Paul Kihara Kariuki =

Attorney General of Kenya (2018–2022)

Attorney General of Kenya
- In office 13 February 2018 – 27 October 2022
- Appointed by: Uhuru Kenyatta
- Preceded by: Githu Muigai

Court of Appeal President
- In office 2012–2018
- Succeeded by: William Ouko

Personal details
- Born: 11 May 1954 Kiambu, Colony and Protectorate of Kenya
- Died: 2 November 2026 (aged 72)
- Spouse: Sarah Njoki Kariuki (m. 1976)
- Children: 3
- Education: University of Nairobi (Bachelors of Law)
- Profession: Lawyer

Paul Kihara Kariuki (11 May 1954 – 2 November 2026) was a Kenyan lawyer, Attorney General, court of appeal president and judge. He was nominated for the post of Attorney General of Kenya by President Uhuru Kenyatta on 13 February 2018 following the resignation of Githu Muigai.

== Early life and education ==
Paul Kihara Kariuki was born in Kiambu, Colony and Protectorate of Kenya, on 11 May 1954. His parents were the Anglican Church bishop Obadiah Kariuki, and Lillian Wairimu, the daughter of Senior Chief Koinange. He attended Nairobi School and graduated from the University of Nairobi with a Bachelor of Laws degree in 1977.

== Judicial career ==
Between 1977 and 1980 Kariuki was a legal assistant at Hamilton, Harrison, and Matthews in Nairobi and then a partner from 1981 to 1986.

In 1986 he established Ndungu Njoroge and Kwach Advocates with his partners where he practiced until 2000, then was appointed the director of Kenya School of Law, a position that had become vacant after the previous holder, Leonard Njagi, was appointed a High Court judge.

In October 2003, Kariuki was one of the judges appointed judges of the High Court by President Kibaki. On appointment, Justice Kariuki became the duty judge at the High Court, replacing Justice Isaac Lenaola who had been appointed a member of the tribunal to investigate judges who chose to contest their removal from the bench. Justice Kariuki was to hold the position of duty judge for the next two years.

In 2006, Chief Justice Gicheru appointed an integrity review committee and appointed Kariuki to head this committee.

In 2009, the Chief Justice appointed Justice Kariuki to head the newly established Judicial Training Institute (JTI).

In 2012 Justice Kariuki was appointed a Court of Appeal Judge and later appointed President of the Court of appeal.

== Death ==
Justice Kariuki died on Monday, 2nd November 2026, at the age of 72.

== Read also ==
- Doreen Majala
- William Kamoti
