= Sharad Rao (judge) =

Chairman of the Kenya Judges and Magistrates Vetting Board
- Incumbent
- Assumed office September 2011

Personal details
- Born: Sharad Rao; 1936 (age 89–90) Nairobi, Kenya

Sharad S. Rao is a Kenyan who serves as the Chairman of the Kenya Judges and Magistrates Vetting Board since September 2011.
