= Isaac Lenaola =

Kenyan judge (born 1967)

The Hon. Justice Isaac Lenaola

Justice of the Supreme Court of Kenya
- Incumbent
- Assumed office 28 October 2016
- Appointed by: Uhuru Kenyatta
- Preceded by: Philip Tunoi

Personal details
- Born: 21 December 1967 (age 58) Samburu District, Kenya
- Education: University of Nairobi (Bachelor of Laws); Kenya School of Law (Advocates Training Programme)
- Occupation: Justice of Kenya of the Supreme Court of Kenya
- Profession: Judge

Isaac Lenaola is a Kenyan lawyer and judge, who has served as a Justice of the Supreme Court of Kenya, since 28 October 2016.

== Background and education ==
He was born in present-day Samburu County, on 21 December 1967. He began his education at St. Mary's Nursery School in Maralal, in 1973. He continued his education at "Maralal D.E.B. Primary School" and "Baragoi Primary School" where he sat for his Primary Leaving Examinations. From 1981, he studied at Alliance High School for his O-Level and A-level studies, graduating in 1986, at the top of his class, with the best possible score in A-Level education in Kenya.

In 1987, Isaac Lenaola was admitted to the University of Nairobi, where he studied law, graduating with a Bachelor of Laws, in 1990. He then studied at the Kenya School of Law, where he obtained the Advocates Training Programme. In 1991 he was admitted to the Kenya Bar.

== Career ==
He joined "Rimui & Mubia Advocates", as an Associate Advocate circa 1992. From 1999 until 2003 he served as a Partner and Head of the Litigation Department at the firm of "Maina Wachira & Company Advocates". On 28 October 2003, he was appointed a Justice of the High Court of Kenya.He served in that capacity as a Resident High Court Judge in Embu, Meru, Machakos, Nyeri and Kakamega. He served as a Commissioner at the Judicial Service Commission, from October 2010 until 2013. From July 2011 to date, he is the Deputy Principal Judge of the East African Court of Justice.

== Other considerations ==
In November 2013, Justice Isaac Lenaola was appointed as a Judge of the "Residual Special Court for Sierra Leone". In this capacity, he is involved in commutation of sentences, reviews and retrials from the former "Special Court for Sierra Leone". In the past, he is the chairman of the "Kenya Magistrates and Judges Association". Since 2020, he has been President of the International Association of Refugee and Migration Judges. He is also currently a member of the board of directors at the "Kenya Judicial Training Institute".

== See also ==
- David Maraga
- Philomena Mwilu
- Judiciary of Kenya
