= William Ouko =

Kenyan lawyer and judge (born 1961)

Justice Hon. Justice William Ouko

Judge of Supreme Court of Kenya
- Appointed by: Uhuru Kenyatta
- Preceded by: Jackton Boma Ojwang Previous office

Personal details
- Born: 21 November 1961 (age 64)
- Profession: Judge

Justice William Ouko is a Kenyan lawyer and Judge with experience in judicial and administrative service spanning over 35 years. He is currently serving as a Judge of the Supreme Court of Kenya. He was nominated by the Judicial Service Commission for the seat of a Judge of the Supreme Court on 5 May 2021. On 14 May 2021, he was appointed to the position by the President of the Republic of Kenya H.E Uhuru Kenyatta, CGH and was subsequently sworn in on 21 May 2021. He served as the President of the Court of Appeal of Kenya prior to his appointment to the Supreme Court, a position to which he was elected on 9 March 2018.

== Biography ==
Justice Ouko is a holder of a Masters in Criminology and Criminal Justice from Egerton University, a Bachelor of Laws Degree (LLB) from the University of Nairobi, and a Diploma in Legal Practice from the Kenya School of Law. Justice Ouko practiced law briefly at Mbogholi Msagha and Company Advocates, Mombasa in 1987. He joined the Judiciary as District Magistrate II (Professional) the same year. He served in different positions, rising through the ranks to the Office of the Registrar of the High Court and Accounting Officer of the Judiciary in 2002. He was elevated to the High Court as a Judge in 2004 and served at the Malindi, Meru and Nakuru High Court stations. He was appointed as a Court of Appeal Judge, in 2012 and on 9 March 2018 he was elected by his colleagues as the President of the Court of Appeal where he served until June 2021. Justice Ouko served in the administrative wing of the Judiciary for many years in such positions as Deputy Registrar, Senior Registrar, Principal Deputy Registrar, the first-ever Chief Court Administrator, and Registrar of the High Court between 1990- 2004.

Justice Ouko has served in various committees and Tribunals notable among them being East Africa Judicial Education Committee, the Presidential Committee to inquire into Terms and Condition of Service of the Judiciary (The Kotut Committee), the Judicial Commission of Inquiry into the Goldenberg Affair, chairperson of the Task Force on Judicial Reforms, chairperson of the subcommittee of the National Council on the Administration of Justice (NCAJ) to monitor the administrative and contingency management plan to mitigate Covid-19 in Kenya's Justice Sector- 2020 and as the chairperson of the 2020 Core Organizing Committee for the 3rd Regional Symposium on Greening the Judiciaries in Africa (The 3rd Regional Symposium on Greening the Judiciaries was postponed from 2020 to 2023 due to the coronavirus pandemic)
