= Willy Mutunga =

13th Chief Justice of the Republic of Kenya

Justice Willy Munyoki Mutunga E.G.H.
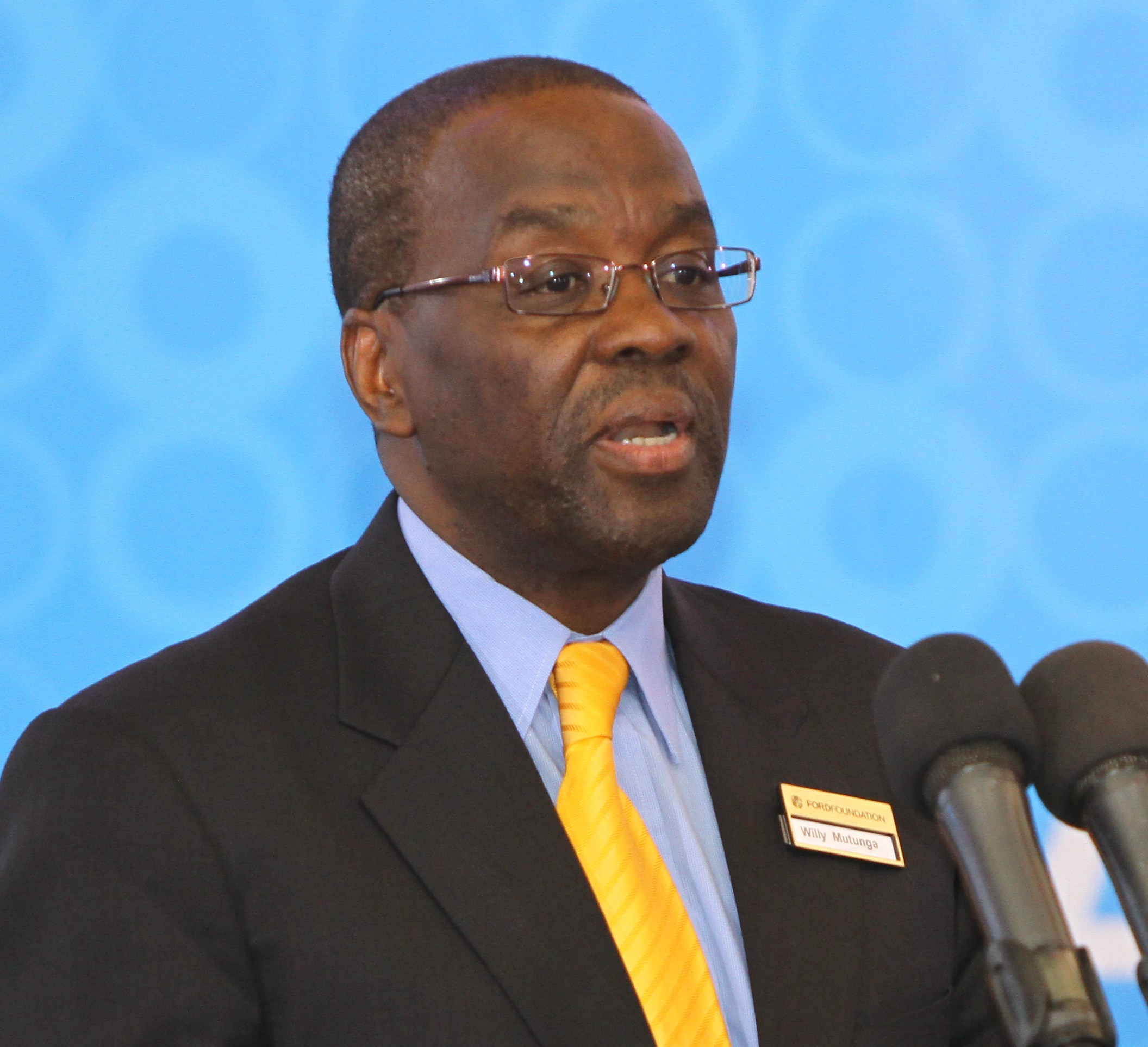

Chief Justice of Kenya
- In office 20 June 2011 – 16 June 2016
- Nominated by: Judicial Service Commission (Kenya)
- Appointed by: Mwai Kibaki
- Preceded by: Johnson Evan Gicheru
- Succeeded by: David Maraga

Personal details
- Born: 16 June 1946 (age 80) Kitui District, Kenya Colony
- Education: UoN (LL.B); UDSM (LL.M); YorkU (Ph.D)
- Profession: Judge

Willy Munyoki Mutunga, EGH (born 16 June 1946) is a Kenyan lawyer, intellectual, reform activist, and was the Commonwealth Special Envoy to the Maldives. He is also an active member of the Justice Leadership Group. He is the retired Chief Justice of Kenya and President of the Supreme Court of Kenya.

== Background ==
Mutunga's father, Mzee Mutunga Mbiti, worked as a tailor in the small town of Kilonzo, Nzambani in Kitui District. He died in 1985. His mother, Mbesa Mutunga, died in 1982.

Mutunga attended Ithookwe Primary School before proceeding to Kitui School for his Kenya Certificate of Education exams. He was the first student to score six points in the exams (an "A" in all subjects), earning him a place at the Strathmore College for his "A" levels. Mutunga received a Bachelor of Laws degree from the University of Dar Es Salaam in 1971 and a Master of Laws from the University of Dar es Salaam in 1974. Mutunga joined the law faculty at the University of Nairobi as a lecturer, becoming the first indigenous Kenyan to teach constitutional law at the university level. In the late 1980s, he received his Doctorate of Laws from the Osgoode Hall Law School at York University in Toronto.

On 13 May 2011, the Judicial Service Commission of Kenya (Note: The website of the Judicial Service Commission of Kenya.) recommended to President Mwai Kibaki that he appoint Mutunga as chief justice of Kenya. After consulting with Prime Minister Raila Odinga, Kibaki made the appointment, and the National Assembly approved it on 15 June 2011. He was sworn into office on 20 June 2011. Because of Kenya's mandatory retirement age of 70, Mutunga was to leave office on a date not later than 16 June 2017.

Mutunga has been married twice. He has a son and a daughter from his first marriage. He had two other sons with different women in 1993 and 1999.

On 20 July 2000, he married professor Beverle Michele Lax in San Mateo, California. He filed for a divorce on 13 May 2010.

== Roots of radical activism ==
More than two decades of writings, particularly in the media, reveal that Mutunga's activism was inspired by several nationalists. Among these were the anti-colonial fighter Dedan Kimathi, Kenyan activist Pio Gama Pinto, and Guinea Bissau's celebrated nationalist intellectual Amílcar Cabral.

As a law lecturer at the University of Nairobi in the 1970s and 1980s, Mutunga's activism was associated with a small but determined group of academics who identified with Marxist / Socialist ideologies, including Ngũgĩ wa Thiong'o, Al-Amin Mazrui, Kamonji Wachira, and Maina wa Kinyatti. On 19 April 1972, this group formed the University Staff Union (USU). Mutunga became the general secretary of USU in 1979, months after Daniel arap Moi succeeded Jomo Kenyatta as president and began tightening his grip on power. Mutunga immediately rallied other USU officials around a campaign for the reinstatement of Prof. Ngũgĩ wa Thiong'o to his former job of teaching English and Literature at the University of Nairobi. Ngũgĩ was incarcerated by the Kenyatta government in December 1977, and although he was released in December 1978, he never returned to his job. Police arrested Mutunga on 10 June 1980, and USU was banned on 19 July 1980.

Mutunga's arrest threw light on the activities of a seemingly burgeoning Kenyan underground in the repressive 1980s. He was accused of being a member of the underground group known as the December Twelve Movement and of participating in the production of the movement's publication, Pambana. The police alleged they had found stamps used for mailing Pambana after searching Mutunga's house. On 12 June 1982, he was charged in court of being in possession of a "seditious" leaflet bearing the headings "J. M. Solidarity Day" and "Don't Be Fooled: Reject these Nyayos". On 29 July 1982, he was detained, just three days before 1 August 1982 abortive coup by the Air Force. He was also dismissed from his University of Nairobi job.

== Activities while in Canada ==
Mutunga went to Canada after his release on 20 October 1983. There, he joined a group of exiled Kenyan student and intellectual activists and obtained his Doctorate of Law from Osgoode Hall Law School in Toronto. While pursuing his doctorate, Mutunga cooperated with other Kenyan exiles to launch the Kenya Human Rights Commission (KHRC) to further the struggle for socio-economic justice and a democratic constitutional order. Among these exiles were Kiraitu Murungi, then a law lecturer and pursuing his master's degree at Harvard Law School; and Makau W. Mutua and Maina Kiai, both United States-based anti-Moi activists.

As the cold war ended, Mutunga, like many radical African academics, made the neoliberal turn and began reconfiguring politics around a re-engineered liberal civil society.

Upon Kenya's return to multi-party democracy in 1991, Mutunga and other exiles began returning home. In 1992, the KHRC itself was relocated back to Kenya and registered in March 1994, starting its operations from the Chambers of Kamau Kuria and Kiraitu Murungi Advocates. It gave legal cover to an array of nongovernmental organisations in civil society that could not secure registration from the Moi government. It also served as the think tank for Kenya's pro-democracy movement.

== Reforming civil society and the constitution ==
In 1992, Mutunga joined the ranks of the country's pro-democracy Young Turks, which included, among others, Paul Muite, James Orengo, Kiraitu Murungi, Gitobu Imanyara, and Raila Odinga.

Most of the Young Turks drifted to active politics following the formation of the Forum for the Restoration of Democracy - Kenya in 1992 as an omnibus political movement. Mutunga, however, became the chairman of the non-governmental Kenya Human Rights Commission (KHRC), which he later also served as executive director. The KHRC supported the formation and existence of organisations such as Kituo cha Sheria (Note: The website of Kituo cha Sheria.) and the Public Law Institute.

Mutunga also retained his global intellectual networks. He served on the boards of various organisations, including the Buffalo Human Rights Center (Note: The website of the Buffalo Human Rights Center.) at the University at Buffalo Law School, the State University of New York.

Mutunga served as vice-chairman of the Law Society of Kenya (LSK) from 1991 to 1993 and chairman from 1993 to 1995. During his tenure as vice-chairman and chairman, Mutunga helped launch the LSK into activist politics, making it appear as a more formidable opposition than the splintering opposition parties.

Mutunga's concept of "constitution-making from the middle" also got its practical expression during this period. Supported by a Ford Foundation grant, LSK teamed with the KHRC and the Kenya chapter of the International Commission of Jurists to produce a draft of a new constitution. This project was aimed at showing that constitutional reforms were possible despite resistance by the Daniel arap Moi regime. On 6 January 1995, the constitutional caucus was renamed the Citizens' Coalition for Constitutional Change (or 4Cs) with Mutunga and Christopher Mulei as its face. The 4Cs put together a coalition of political parties and civic groups that planned for a national convention on the constitution. This initiative resulted in the formation in April 1997 of the National Constituent Assembly and its executive wing, the National Convention Executive Council (NCEC) with former dean of law, Professor Kivutha Kibwana, as its spokesperson. The NCEC organised constitution reform rallies in May, July, and August 1997. Moi responded by arguing that the government could not negotiate about constitutional reform with the civil sector, including the NCEC, that consisted of people who had no elective mandate. Members of the National Assembly bought the argument and abandoned the NCEC in favour of the newly formed Inter-Parties' Parliamentary Group (IPPG), which overtook the NCEC's initiative and allowed Moi to take control of the reform process and then emasculate it. The IPPG shepherded minimal reforms before the 1997 elections and the enactment of the Constitution of Kenya Review Commission Act in 1997. The NCEC, however, condemned the reforms as greatly flawed and not addressing the basic problems that caused the constitutional crisis.

== Coalition building and division ==
Mutunga has been hailed as "an excellent negotiator". He convened the breakfast meetings of the then opposition stalwarts, Mwai Kibaki, Charity Ngilu, and Michael Wamalwa, to forge a common alliance ahead of the 2002 elections. The unity talks culminated in the creation of the National Alliance for Change as a single coalition of fourteen parties, later renamed the National Alliance Party of Kenya. The Alliance merged with defectors from President Daniel arap Moi's Kenya African National Union and joined the Liberal Democratic Party (LDP) to form the National Alliance of Rainbow Coalition (NARC). Mutunga declined an offer to serve as the chairperson of NARC, saying that his main interest was to unite the opposition and not to join active politics. The NARC won the 2002 elections. After the elections, Mutunga was one of the senior counsels appointed by President Kibaki in 2003 under Section 17 of the Advocates Act. (Note: The Advocates Act of Kenya.)

The NARC became the litmus gauge for Mutunga's political neutrality, which lasted as long as the coalition elite stayed united by the post-election euphoria. As soon as power wrangles between the Kibaki and Raila Odinga factions of the NARC set in after 2002, Mutunga's relations with the Kibaki administration grew frosty. On 8 April 2003, he turned down an appointment by President Kibaki to the university council of the Jomo Kenyatta University of Agriculture and Technology, saying that he lacked the right qualifications for the position and was not consulted before the appointment.

Like many left-wing academics, Mutunga was an admirer of Jaramogi Oginga Odinga. After 2003, he drifted ideologically to the portion of the NARC that identified with Raila Odinga's LDP wing. In a 2003 interview with Raila's biographer, Babafemi Badejo, Mutunga lauded Odinga as "an aggressive and astute politician" whose role in the 1997 National Convention Executive Council rallies showed him as a "great mobilizer and organizer". His only misgiving was Odinga's contradictory role as a "nationalist and a patriot" on the one hand and "an ethnic baron" who "uses both nationalist and ethnic cards for the advancement of his political project". But he exculpated Odinga from this contradiction arguing that he "has always struggled against dictatorship and oppression and has been for social justice". Ahead of the divisive 2007 presidential campaign, Mutunga threw his weight behind Odinga, saying "I am convinced Kenya's transition needs Raila as the president of this country".

== Move to the foreign donor sector ==
In 2004, as the intra-elite rivalry in the National Alliance of Rainbow Coalition and fissures over the constitutional negotiations turned perilous ahead of the 2005 referendum, Mutunga joined the Ford Foundation in Nairobi as a human rights programme officer. In 2009, he became the executive director overseeing all grant making in Eastern Africa, mainly focusing on human rights and social justice and protection of women's rights.

Mutunga's decision to leave Kenya's declining civil society for a foreign foundation operating in Kenya dented his pro-reform credentials in the eyes of some. Foreign bilateral donor countries, such as the United States and the United Kingdom, had long been accused of having double standards, supporting despotism, and responding inadequately to pre- and post-presidential election violence, government corruption, ethnic tensions, and presidential authoritarianism. Based at least in part on a December 2008 interview with Mutunga, Canadian scholar Stephen Brown said, "Donors [defined by Brown as western governments and their missions in Kenya, including both diplomatic and aid representatives, but not specifically including private entities] might not actually mind the 'imperial' powers of the presidency, as it makes for a strong interlocutor. For instance, they would prefer not to renegotiate access to military bases with parliament."

When he was participating in the donor sector, Mutunga is said to have grown ideologically intolerant, tagging and parodying those of his former colleagues in civil society and the academy aligned to the Kibaki government as "traitors".

At a July 2010 meeting of the Bunge La Mwananchi (Note: The website of Bunge Law Mwananchi.) movement, one participant alleged that Mutunga had "intruded into the movement's affairs eroding the ideals set by the founders and causing needless friction and infighting amongst the rank and file". Another said that Mutunga had been claiming falsely that the Ford Foundation was working with the movement and that Mutunga had planned a counter-demonstration to support certain corrupt individuals when the movement was planning to move against them.

Some Christian Kenyans accused the Ford Foundation of funding, while Mutunga worked for the foundation, abortion rights advocacy organisations and liberal sex education groups worldwide, including among others the International Planned Parenthood Federation, the Planned Parenthood Federation of America, and the Sexuality Information and Education Council of the United States.

== Appointment of Mutunga as Chief Justice ==
=== Recommendation from the Judicial Service Commission to appoint Mutunga ===
Mutunga was among twelve applicants, and one of the ten shortlisted, (Note: The others shortlisted were Judge Lee Muthoga; Court of Appeal judges Alnashir Visram, Joseph Nyamu, Riaga Omollo, and Samuel Bosire; and High Court Judges Paul Kihara, Msagha Mbogoli, Mary Angawa, and Kalpana Rawal.) for the position of chief justice. On 13 May 2011 after a televised interview, the Judicial Service Commission (JSC) recommended to President Mwai Kibaki that he appoint Mutunga. This recommendation was pursuant to the JSC's obligation under Article 172(1)(a) of the Constitution of Kenya to "recommend to the President persons for appointment as judges".

The recommendation divided the judiciary.

Some of the judges and lawyers interviewed charged that the JSC had demeaned senior judges and portrayed them as incompetent. They viewed the interview process as unjust and a pre-determined sham informed by a misleading philosophy of a "reformist" chief justice from outside the current judiciary.

Because the JSC recommended to the President only one person for appointment as chief justice, the JSC was faulted for usurping the powers of the President as the appointing authority. This approach also was seen as risky because if the appointee were rejected by the National Assembly of Kenya, the hiring process would have had to start afresh.

=== Reactions to President Kibaki's appointment of Mutunga ===
Mutunga's appointment was well received by major sections of the Kenyan public. Proponents highlighted his credentials as an intellectual, a "reformer", and an "activist with a track-record of integrity and sound legal grounding". They also saw him as the "new broom to clean up the institution," especially the judiciary.

The appointment also drew an equally fierce resistance. Opponents hinged on a two-stranded argument. First, Mutunga had no experience as a judge or legal practitioner. Because of this, opponents claimed he was ill-suited to spearhead a credible and surgical reform of the judiciary. Second, some questioned Mutunga's neoliberal "reform" ideology and how it would likely impact the judiciary and the spirit of the new constitution. One writer observed that "enthusiasm for neo-liberal values is not and cannot be a judicial virtue, since, ultimately, judicial independence requires neutral judges". Judicial activism would undo the visions of many Kenyans regarding the new constitution should Mutunga carry his passions to their final station. However, Maina Kiai, the United Nations Special Rapporteur on the rights to freedom of peaceful assembly and of association, vigorously defended Mutunga's activism, stating,

[A]t some point, ... "activist" has taken on a negative sense in some Kenyan circles. Yet the opposite of activist is someone who is a conformist, takes orders, does not challenge authority even when it is wrong, and does what he or she is ordered. ... Whether in the judiciary, civil service, or legislature, we should be seeking women and men of principle who are willing to stand up for what they believe. ... We have assumed that what is needed to be a "good public servant" is someone who is essentially an "empty debe" to be filled in with orders from above and who will not challenge authority or question it. And without rigorous challenge, the quality of decision making suffers.... What we have then gotten, are public servants whose first loyalty is to power, rather than to principle, or to the Constitution. They have seen their task as doing what those wielding power want, no matter how wrong or ridiculous; and no matter that it could be illegal. And from this then arise the problems of impunity and tribalism as these are the natural defenses that conformists use. Let's be clear here: The Judiciary, perhaps more than any other institution, needs men and women of principle loyal first to the constitution and to the people.

==== Opposition based on Mutunga's sexuality, culture, and spirituality ====
Opposition by the church and various religious sections of the society made Mutunga's appointment controversial. Peter Karanja, the general secretary of the National Council of Churches of Kenya, led the Christian church's opposition to Mutunga's nomination. At the heart of the church's resistance was Mutunga's public defence of the gay and lesbian communities. As "Cabral Pinto", the name of a columnist with the Daily Nation newspapers that Mutunga used as his pen-name since 2006 to avoid conflict of interest as Ford Foundation senior manager, his articles were well known for defending gay rights and "Africanizing homosexuality" in Kenya and the region.

The gay movement in Kenya, however, welcomed Mutunga's nomination as a choice "that reflect the changing trends and pursuit for surgical reform within the Kenyan judiciary".

Mutunga's wearing of a single earring, often associated with women, turned the spotlight on his sexuality and spirituality. Mutunga asserted that the earring was a source of ancestral inspiration and not related to his sexuality. He also stated that he is not gay. However, the Eldoret North member of parliament, William Ruto, said, "We cannot have a CJ who spots studs on his ears and claims he uses them to communicate with unseen spirits". As a result, Mutunga categorically declared, "There is no way I can remove this earring even if I become the chief justice. If am told I must remove it to get the job of chief justice, I will say keep your job".

Compounding the controversy was Mutunga's religious identity. He started as a practitioner of African traditional religion but in 2001 was baptised a Protestant and subsequently became a Roman Catholic and then a Muslim, although he still follows his ancestors. He says it was his ancestors who instructed him in 2003 to wear the earring as a connection to them so that they can protect him. Muslim groups and parliamentarians backed the appointment of Mutunga. They pledged, however, to advise Mutunga to remove the earring as Islam does not allow male believers to put on ornaments worn by women.

==== Opposition based on Mutunga's acrimonious divorce ====
Mutunga has been married twice. He has a daughter and son from his first marriage. Two additional sons were born to two different women in 1993 and 1999 while Mutunga was single. On 16 December 2009, Mutunga filed for divorce from his second wife, Professor Beverle Michele Lax, whom he married in San Mateo, California on 20 July 2000. She filed an answer and a counter-petition on 13 May 2010. She accused him of being a "pathological liar" who "kept an open relationship with his former wife" and "concealed the existence of his relationship with women whom he had sired children with". Upon his nomination for chief justice, the proceedings became a subject of intense public scrutiny and media analysis. The nomination also raised the question of whether Mutunga would unduly influence the outcome of his divorce case should he be approved as chief justice. Mutunga denied that he would exercise such influence and asked the public to keenly follow the matter if he were appointed.

=== 2013 presidential election challenge ===
After the first round of the presidential election took place on 4 March 2013, the Independent Electoral and Boundaries Commission declared Uhuru Kenyatta the president-elect of Kenya. Raila Odinga challenged this in the Supreme Court of Kenya. The court unanimously dismissed the challenge on 30 March 2013, with Mutunga reading the decision of the court.

== Retirement ==
Mutunga announced in 2015 that he would retire early from his office to give the country sufficient time to recruit a new Chief Justice to avoid the crisis that might arise if the August 2017 General Election is held without a substantive holder of the office of Chief Justice. Having been born in 1947, Mutunga was set to retire from office when he turned 70 in June 2017 in accordance with Article 167(1) of the Constitution of Kenya. This would be a mere two months before the August 2017, and he anticipated that the Judicial Service Commission would not have enough time to recruit a new Chief Justice who needed to be in office in case a petition challenging the presidential poll is filed in the Supreme Court.

True to his word, Mutunga retired on his 69th birthday on 16 June 2016, handing over the leadership of the Supreme Court of Kenya to Justice Mohamed Ibrahim who was the senior-most of the four Judges remaining in the Court. In his farewell speech to Kenyans, he expressed confidence that he was leaving behind "a Judiciary more independent and more humane; one that has defended the Constitution and exponentially expanded access to justice; one that had reduced case backlog, including some that have been in the system for over 30 years; one that has invested in massive infrastructure; one that has unflinchingly fought corruption, even as the corruption sisterhood and brotherhood have activated their solidarities in other arenas; and one that is accountable, open and responsible to the public, as well as to its employees."

== Appointment as the Commonwealth Special Envoy to the Maldives ==
Willy Mutunga announced during his retirement speech that he had accepted an appointment by the Secretary General of the Commonwealth, Patricia Scotland, as a Commonwealth Special Envoy to Maldives, to try to bring the political leadership there together, and to aid in the process of constitutional and political transition. His overriding mandate would be to ‘support a sustainable political dialogue process leading to a stronger climate of pluralism and inclusive elections in 2018, and to encourage the strengthening of democratic institutions and culture in Maldives’.

== Controversy ==
In August 2016 Mutunga became subject of criticism when he made the following statement on Twitter after concluding 4-day trip to the Maldives as Special Envoy:

"Three observations on the Maldives: beautiful islands and clean waters around them; malaria free; a presidential motorcade of TWO vehicles".

This trivial tweet from Mutunga came just days after president Yameen ratified a law restricting freedom of expression and on the day government-controlled parliament passed a bill curtailing freedom of assembly. Among the critics include UN Special Rapporteur for Iran and former Foreign Minister of Maldives Ahmed Shaheed.

== Activism after retirement ==
In 2024 Mutunga cleared the air, affirming that he was not in detention. This was after rumours spread in social media that he was arrested for having protested at the DCI headquarters for the release of detained protesters in the Anti-Finance Bill protests.

In May 2025, he alongside Boniface Mwangi, Hussein Khalid and Hanifa Adan were arrested and detained at Julius Nyerere Airport in Dar es Salaam, Tanzania. They had travelled to Tanzania in a show of solidarity to Tanzanian activist Tundu Lissu, who is vocal critic of Samia Suluhu's administration and had been charged for treason, and to observe the court proceedings. They were later released on 22 May 2025 without being charged.

== See also ==
- Constitution of Kenya
- Martha Koome
- Law Society of Kenya
- Politics in Kenya
- 2013 Kenya general elections
- David Maraga
