= Hannah Okwengu =

Kenyan judge

Hon. Lady Justice Hannah Magondi Okwengu

Judge of the Court of Appeal of Kenya
- In office 2011–2025

Personal details
- Born: Honge Beach, Yimbo West, near Kisumu, Kenya
- Spouse: Married
- Children: 4
- Education: University of Nairobi (LLB); Kenya School of Law (Diploma); Queen Mary University of London (LLM)
- Occupation: Judge
- Profession: Lawyer
- Known for: Service in the Kenyan judiciary and the Court of Appeal

Rtd. Lady Justice Hannah Magondi Okwengu was a judge of the Court of Appeal in Nairobi.

== Education and early career ==
Okwengu was born in Honge Beach (Yimbo West, near Kisumu). She graduated law school at University of Nairobi in 1979.

She began work as a Land Registrar in Mombasa and for three years she was an advocate with the Municipal Council of Mombasa.

After less than a year at a law firm she joined the Judiciary as an acting Resident Magistrate in October 1983. Justice Okwengu was a Chief Magistrate by 1999. She then became the Assistant Director of the Kenya Anti-Corruption Authority when she was appointed by President Daniel Moi for a five year term. She served as Chief Magistrate in Mombasa, Nakuru, and Nairobi, and was the Judge in Charge of the Mombasa Law Court.

She became the President for four years of the International Association of Women Judges Kenya Chapter. She represents East and Southern Africa at the IAWJ. In 2017 at an IAWJ meeting she called for special courts to tackle rape and other sexual and gender based violence.

== Personal life ==
Married, with two sons, two daughters and six grandchildren.

== See also ==
- African Women Law Legacy Project, Justice Hannah Okwengu. Part 1
- African Women Law Legacy Project, Justice Hannah Okwengu. Part 2
