= Nancy Makokha Baraza =

Kenyan judge

Deputy Chief Justice of Kenya
- In office 2011–2012
- Succeeded by: Kalpana Rawal

Personal details
- Born: 1957 (age 68–69)
- Children: Bien-Aimé Baraza

Nancy Makokha Baraza (born 1957 in Bungoma District, Western Kenya) is a former Kenyan judge. She was the first Deputy Chief Justice of Kenya and a founding member of Kenya's Supreme Court following the promulgation of the 2010 Constitution of Kenya. She served from June 2011 until her suspension in January 2012, ultimately resigning on 18 October 2012.

== Career ==
Baraza was appointed vice chair of the Kenya Law Reform Commission in 2008, serving a three-year term. In early 2010, she was elected chair of the Media Council of Kenya's Ethics and Complaints Commission.

=== Federation of Women Lawyers (FIDA-Kenya) ===
Baraza previously served as chair of the Kenyan chapter of the Federation of Women Lawyers (FIDA), a leading advocacy group for democracy, women's rights, and child protection.

=== Kenya Constitutional Review Commission ===
She was a key member of the Constitution of Kenya Review Commission, led by Yash Pal Ghai. The commission drafted the Bomas Constitution, which influenced the final 2010 Constitution.

=== Life After Office ===
She later became a lecturer at the University of Nairobi School of Law. On 9 January, she was appointed by president Ruto as the chairperson of the 42 member Technical Working Group on Gender-Based Violence (GBV).

== Appointment as deputy chief justice ==
In May 2011, the Judicial Service Commission (JSC) conducted public interviews for the positions of chief justice and deputy chief justice. The JSC nominated Willy Munyoki Mutunga as chief justice and Nancy Baraza as deputy chief justice. The nominations were approved by President Mwai Kibaki and Prime Minister Raila Odinga, after which Parliament confirmed their appointments.

== Academic contributions ==
Baraza earned a Doctor of Laws (PhD) from the University of Nairobi in 2016. She is a senior lecturer and chair of the Department of Public Law at the University of Nairobi's School of Law. Her teaching areas include:

- Family law
- Jurisprudence
- Social foundations of law and development
- Access to justice

== Baraza-Kerubo Village Market incident ==
In January 2012, the Judicial Service Commission (JSC) launched an investigation into allegations that Deputy Chief Justice Nancy Baraza assaulted a female security guard at the Village Market shopping mall on 31 December 2011. Following the inquiry, the JSC recommended her suspension and requested President Mwai Kibaki to establish a tribunal to investigate her conduct under Article 168 (4) of the Constitution. After a formal suspension, the tribunal recommended her removal for gross misconduct. On 18 October 2012, she resigned, withdrawing her appeal to the Supreme Court.
