= Supreme Court of Kenya =

Highest court in Kenya

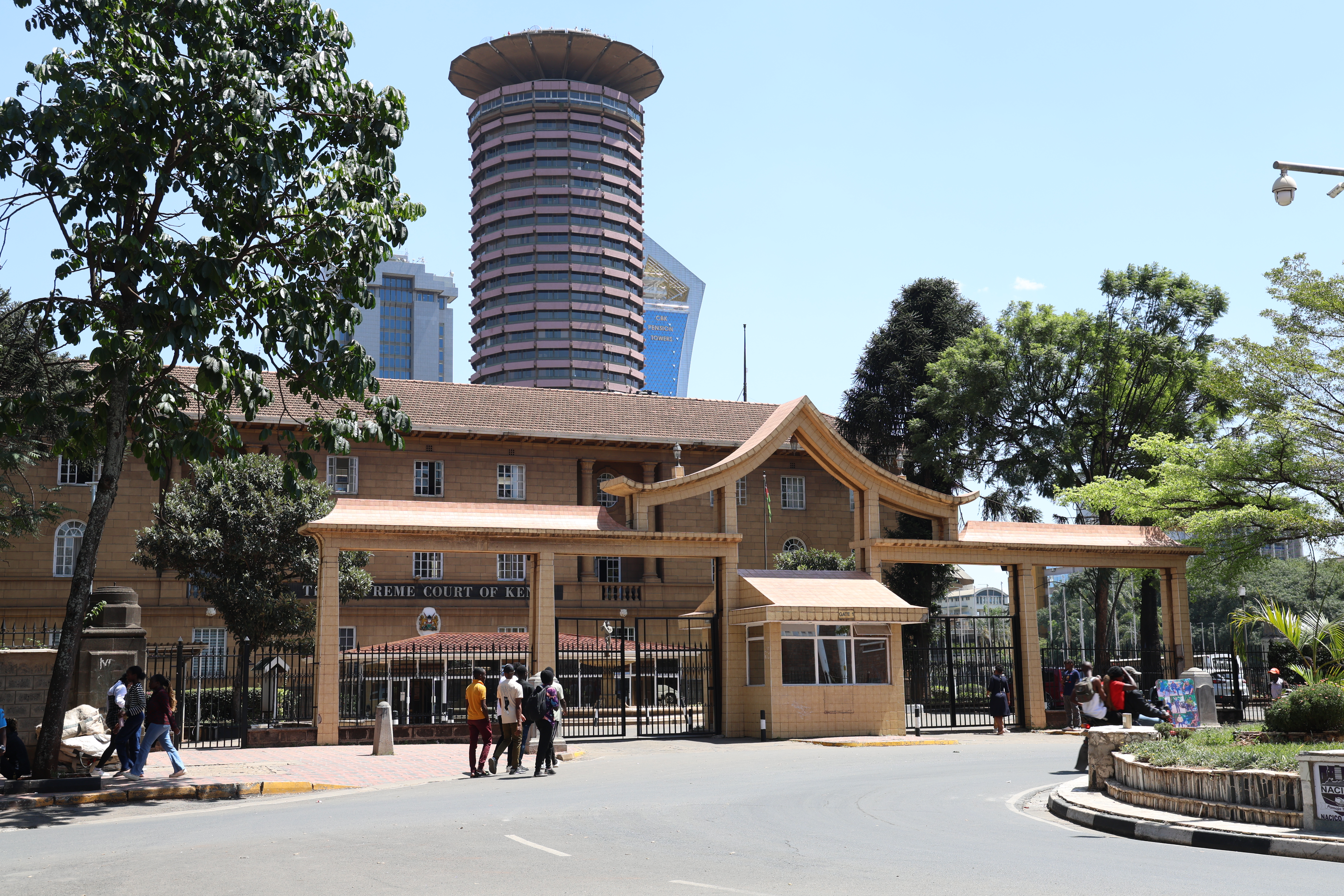
- Interactive map of Supreme Court of Kenya
- 1.2875°S 36.8231°E
- Established: 1906
- Jurisdiction: Kenya
- Location: Nairobi, Kenya
- Coordinates: 1.2875°S 36.8231°E
- Motto: Justice be our shield and defender
- Composition method: Judicial Commission of Kenya
- Authorised by: Kenyan Constitution
- Appeals from: High courts of Kenya
- Judge term length: Mandatory retirement at age 70
- Website: supremecourt.ke

Chief Justice of Kenya
- Currently: Martha Koome
- Since: 21 May 2021

The Supreme Court of Kenya is the highest court in Kenya. It was established under Article 163 of the new Kenyan Constitution of 2010 as the highest court in the nation. Its decisions are binding and set precedent on all other courts in the country.

== Jurisdiction ==
The Supreme Court has both original and appellate jurisdiction, as well as the jurisdiction to give advisory opinions. The Court has exclusive original jurisdiction to hear and determine disputes relating to the elections to the office of president arising under Article 140 of the Constitution. It has appellate jurisdiction to hear and determine appeals from the Court of Appeal and any other court or tribunal as prescribed by national legislation.

Appeals can only be as a matter of right, where the case involves interpretation or application of the Constitution or a matter certified by the Supreme Court or the Court of Appeal as one that involves a matter of general public importance. The Supreme Court may review a certification by the Court of Appeal and either affirm, vary or overturn it.

The Supreme Court has the jurisdiction to render advisory opinion at the request of the National Government, any state organ, or any county government with respect to any matter concerning County Governments. It can also determine the validity of a declaration of a state of emergency, an extension of such a declaration, or any legislation enacted in consequences of a declaration of a state of emergency.

== Objective of the Court ==
These are provided for in Section 3 of the Supreme Court Act, No. 7, of 2011.

1. Assert the supremacy of the Constitution and the sovereignty of the people of Kenya
2. Provide authoritative and impartial interpretation of the Constitution
3. Develop rich jurisprudence that respects Kenya’s history and traditions and facilitates its social, economic and political growth
4. Enable important constitutional and other legal matters, especially matters on transition to the new Constitution be determined with due regard to the circumstances, history and cultures of the people
5. Improve access to justice
6. Provide for the administration of the supreme court and related matters.

== Composition and membership ==
=== Composition ===
The Supreme Court is made up of seven judges: the Chief Justice, who is the President of the Court, the Deputy Chief Justice, who is the Vice-president of the Court, and five other judges.

Like all other judges of the superior courts in Kenya, Judges of the Supreme Court - including the Chief Justice - serve until mandatory retirement at 70 years. However, an individual cannot serve as the Chief Justice and President of the Supreme Court for more than 10 years even without reaching the age of 70. In the event that a person serves the mandatory ten years as Chief Justice before turning 70, the individual is to retire from the position of Chief Justice but may opt to continue serving as a judge of the Supreme Court, even though this may raise the membership of the court above seven.

=== Quorum ===
The Supreme Court is properly constituted for purposes of its proceedings with five judges sitting. However, two judges can handle interlocutory applications.

=== Current justices ===
The following are the current members of the Supreme Court:

- Hon. Lady Justice Martha Koome - Chief Justice and President of the Supreme Court
- Hon. Lady Justice Philomena Mwilu - Deputy Chief Justice and Vice President of the Supreme Court
- Hon. Justice Dr Smokin Wanjala
- Hon. Lady Justice Njoki Susanna Ndung'u
- Hon. Justice Isaac Lenaola
- Hon. Justice William Ouko
- Hon. Justice Mohamed Abdulahi Warsame

=== Filling of the 2026 vacancy ===
Months after the vacancy caused by the death of Hon. Justice Mohamed Khadhar Ibrahim, the Judicial Service Commission (JSC) held interviews of 5 candidates on 28 and 29 April 2026 at the Milimani Law Courts. Those who originally applied for the post were Anne Makori, Lillian Wachira, judges Joseph Kiplagat Sergon, Warsame Abdulahi Mohammed, Joseph Kipchumba Kigen Katwa, and Francis Kipruto Tuiyott. On 29 April, the JSC announced its nomination of Justice Mohamed Abdulahi Warsame to fill the vacancy. His name was forwarded to the president for formal appointment which occurred in a 5 May Gazette Notice. He was sworn in on 7 May.

=== Former justices ===
- Hon. Justice Mohamed Khadhar Ibrahim, served as a justice of the Supreme Court of Kenya from 2012 until his death in 2025
- Hon. Lady Justice Nancy Makokha Baraza, resigned from office due to "gross misconduct"
- Hon. Justice Dr Willy Mutunga, Retired Chief Justice and President of the Supreme Court of Kenya
- Hon. Lady Justice Kalpana Hasmukhrai Rawal, Retired Deputy Chief Justice & Deputy President of the Supreme Court of Kenya
- Hon. Justice Philip Kiptoo Tunoi, Retired Justice of the Supreme Court of Kenya
- Hon. Justice Prof. Jackton Boma Ojwang, Retired Justice of the Supreme Court of Kenya
- Hon. Justice David Maraga, Retired Chief Justice and President of the Supreme Court

== Notable cases ==
=== 2013 Presidential Election Petition ===
The first round of the presidential election took place on March 4, 2013. Uhuru Kenyatta was declared the president-elect of Kenya by the Independent Electoral and Boundaries Commission (IEBC). Raila Odinga challenged this in the Supreme Court due to several technicalities, including discrepancies in voter numbers as reported by the IEBC, and the failure of biometric voter registration kits; it was ultimately dismissed on March 30, 2013.

At the end of the petition, the Supreme Court declined to nullify the election and affirmed the victory of Uhuru Kenyatta.

=== 2017 Presidential Election Petition ===
The 2017 presidential election took place on August 8, 2017, with the IEBC declaring Uhuru Kenyatta as the winner. Although Raila Odinga and his NASA coalition leaders challenged the declaration, they indicated that they would not file a petition in the Supreme Court given their experience at the Court when they filed a similar petition after the 2013 general election. However, the coalition announced three days later that they would file a case following the government's decision to shut down two leading civil society organisations that had been expected to file a petition at the Court.

Raila Odinga's petition was based on several grounds, including the discrepancy in the presidential vote tally compared to the tally of other elections (the presidential vote tally exceeded the total tally of votes cast for county governors across the country by over half a million), and allegations that the electoral commission's electronic vote transmission system was hacked and a formula introduced which kept Uhuru Kenyatta's vote tally at a consistent 11% ahead of Odinga even as the vote tallies supposedly came in from different parts of the country in which the candidates enjoyed varied support. A statistician prepared an affidavit to show that this gap was statistically impossible if votes came in randomly from different parts of the country. The petitioner also alleged that results declaration forms submitted by the electoral commission were forged to mirror the computer-generated results that were publicly displayed on the results transmission portal that had been hacked, prompting Odinga to refer to the elected leaders as "Vifaranga vya computer", Swahili for "computer hatchlings" or computer-generated leaders.

After the hearing, the Supreme Court rendered a majority decision on September 1, 2017 holding that the election was not conducted in accordance with the Constitution and other electoral laws, that there were illegalities and irregularities committed by the electoral commission including in the results transmission process, and that the said illegalities and irregularities affected the integrity of the election. The Court thus nullified the election and ordered the IEBC to conduct a fresh one within 60 days as required by the Constitution, and while observing strict adherence to the law in the new election. Two judges – Justice Prof J. B. Ojwang' and Lady Justice Njoki Ndung'u – dissented.

The Court delivered a brief verdict on September 1, 2017, saying that it did not have the time to prepare a full reasoned judgment due to the amount of evidence presented. The full judgement was published on 20 September 2017.

== Potential misinformation on social media platforms. ==
A fake screenshot shared on Facebook with a tweet purported to be from Supreme Court of Kenya Judge Njoki Ndung’u claiming to have accused Chief Justice (CJ) Martha Koome of being compromised in her judgement of the 2022 presidential election results in Kenya was fabricated, as was reviewed by PesaCheck.

== See also ==
- Judiciary of Kenya
- Judicial Service Commission (Kenya)
- Kenya Judges and Magistrates Vetting Board
