= Court of Appeal of Kenya =

Court in Kenya

The Court of Appeal of Kenya is established under Article 164 of the constitution of Kenya and currently consists of 42 judges.

The court handles appeals arising over the decisions of the High Court of Kenya, the Environment and Land Court and the Employment and Labour Relations Court as well as any other court or tribunal as provided for in law. The judges of the Court of Appeal elect one judge to represent them on the Judicial Service Commission.

The Court of Appeal currently has six registries, one each in Nairobi, Mombasa, Nyeri, Kisumu, Nakuru and Eldoret.

== Composition ==
Requirements to become a justice are; at least ten years’ experience as a judge of the High Court and courts of equal status or a professionally qualified magistrate, or at least ten years’ experience as a distinguished academic, or legal practitioner or such experience in other relevant legal field. Judges have a mandatory retirement age of 70 years, but may opt to do so at 65 years.

The Constitution and the Court of Appeal (Organization and Administration) Act, 2015 set the minimum number of Court of Appeal Judges at 12. It has a maximum at 70 judges.

Each case is heard by a collegiate bench with an odd number of judges subject to a minimum of three judges. In practice, however, nearly all cases are heard by a three-judge bench. A few exceptional cases have been heard by five or seven judges.

The court is headed by a president of the Court of Appeal who is elected by the judges of the court from among themselves. The current president of the court is Hon. Justice Daniel Isokolo Musinga who was elected on May 24, 2021.

=== Current justices ===
The following are the current members of the Court of Appeal:

- Mr. Daniel K. Musinga – president, Court of Appeal
- Lady Justice Wanjiru Karanja
- Mr. Justice M.S.A. Makhandia
- Mr. Justice Patrick O. Kiage
- Mr. Justice S. Gatembu Kairu
- Mr. Justice Kathurima M’inoti
- Lady Justice Agnes K. Murgor
- Lady Justice Fatuma Sichale (commissioner to the JSC)
- Lady Justice Jamila Mohammed
- Mr. Justice Sankale Ole Kantai
- Lady Justice Hellen Omondi
- Mr. Justice Francis Tuiyott
- Lady Justice Jessie Lesiit
- Lady Justice Mumbi Ngugi
- Lady Justice Pauline Nyamweya
- Mr. Justice Imaana Laibuta
- Mr. Justice Luka Kiprotich Kimaru
- Mr. Justice Paul Mwaniki Gachoka
- Lady Justice Lydia Awino Achode
- Mr. Justice John Mutinga Mativo
- Lady Justice Grace Wangui Ngenye
- Lady Justice Abida Ali Aroni
- Mr. Justice Aggrey Muchelule
- Mr. Justice Weldon Korir
- Mr. Justice George Vincent Odunga
- Mr. Justice (Prof) Joel Ngugi

The following judges joined the court after the 2026 expansion:

- Lady Justice Hedwig Imbosa Ong'udi
- Justice Mathews Nduma Nderi
- Lady Justice Linnet Mumo Ndolo
- Justice Enock Chacha Mwita
- Lady Justice Lucy Mwihaki Njuguna
- Justice Samson Odhiambo Okong'o
- Lady Justice Rachel Chepkoech Ngetich
- Justice Joseph Kipchumba Kigen Katwa
- Justice Stephen Andersen Radido Okiyo
- Justice Brown Murungi Kairaria
- Justice Ahmed Issack Hassan
- Justice Paul Lilan
- Justice Munyao Sila
- Justice Johnson Okoth Okello
- Justice Byram Ongaya

=== Former justices ===
The following are former members of the Court of Appeal:

- Hon Mr. Justice M. Warsame (former commissioner to the JSC) – sworn in as a Supreme Court judge on 7 May 2026
- Hon. Mr. Justice Fredrick Ochieng’ Andago – Died in late 2025
- Lady Justice Hannah Okwengu – Retired
- Hon. Lady Justice Martha Koome – appointed as the chief justice on 19 May 2021
- Hon. Justice William Ouko, former president of the Court of Appeal – appointed as judge of the Supreme Court on 11 May 2021
- Hon. Mr. Justice Erastus M. Githinji – retired in December 2019, appointed by President Kenyatta to chair Tax Appeals Tribunal
- Hon. Mr. Justice (Prof.) James Otieno Odek – died 16 December 2019
- Hon. Mr. Justice Philip N Waki – retired in October 2019
- Hon. Mr. Justice Alnashir R M Visram – retired in August 2019
- Hon Mr. Justice Amritlal Bhagwangi (A.B.) Shah – retired
- Hon. Mr. Justice John Walter Onyango Otieno – retired
- Hon. Mr. Justice Festus Azangalala – retired
- Hon. Mr. Justice Paul Kihara Kariuki, former president of the Court of Appeal – Appointed attorney general in March 2018
- Hon. Lady Justice Philomena Mwilu – appointed deputy chief justice and vice president of the Supreme Court
- Hon. Mr. Justice David Kenani Maraga – appointed chief justice and president of the Supreme Court
- Hon. Mr. Justice John Wycliffe Mwera – Retired
- Hon. Mr. Justice Johnson Evans Gicheru – Former chief justice under the repealed constitution, retired on 27 February 2011, and died on 25 December 2020
- Hon. Mr. Justice Philip Kiptoo Tunoi – appointed judge of the Supreme Court on 16 June 2011
- Hon. Mr. Justice M Ole Keiwua – died 8 October 2011
- Hon. Lady Justice Kalpana Rawal – appointed judge of the Supreme Court on 3 June 2013
- Hon. Mr. Justice Riaga S C Omolo – found unsuitable to continue serving by the Judges and Magistrates Vetting Board
- Hon. Mr. Justice Samuel E O Bosire – found unsuitable to continue serving by the Judges and Magistrates Vetting Board
- Hon. Mr. Justice Emmanuel O'kubasu – found unsuitable to continue serving by the Judges and Magistrates Vetting Board
- Hon. Mr. Justice J G Nyamu – found unsuitable to continue serving by the Judges and Magistrates Vetting Board
- Hon. Lady Justice Effie Owuor
- Hon. Lady Justice Joyce Aluoch
- Hon. Justice Aaron Ringera
- Hon. Lady Justice R. Nambuye
- Hon. Mr. Justice Msagha Mbogholi

=== 2026 Recruitment and expansion ===
The Judicial Service Commission (JSC) advertised 15 vacancies at the court in 2025 and began interviews on 12 January to fill them with the aim of easing "an acute staffing crisis" at the court. The interviews ended on 23 January with the commission having publicly interviewed 35 judges and advocates. The JSC selected and nominated a shortlist of 15 candidates, they were forwarded to President Ruto who appointed them in a 27 January gazette notice. They were sworn in on 28 January at a State House, Nairobi ceremony.

== Jurisdiction ==
The Court of Appeal has jurisdiction to hear appeals from the High Court, the Environment and Land Court and the Employment and Labour Relations Court. It also has jurisdiction to hear appeals from any other court or tribunal as prescribed by an act of parliament. It also hears contempt of court as original jurisdiction.

Appeals from the Court of Appeal are lodged at the Supreme Court of Kenya.
