= Effie Owuor =

Kenyan lawyer and judge (born 1943)

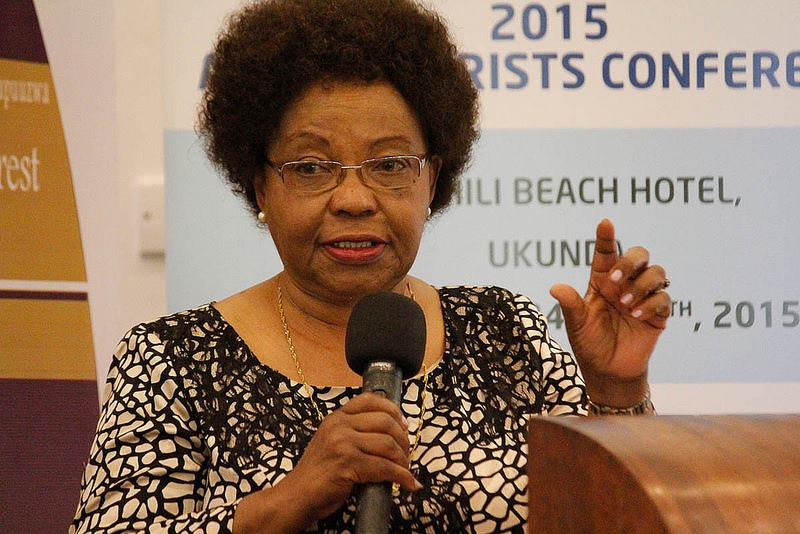

Court of Appeal Judge

Effie Owuor (born 1943) is a Kenyan lawyer and judge who was the country's first female State Counsel, Magistrate, High Court Judge, and Court of Appeal Judge.

== Early life and education ==
Owuor was born in 1943 in Kakamega and attended Butere Girls High School and Alliance Girls High School. She graduated from the University of Dar es Salaam, Tanzania in 1967, which was at the time the only university offering law degrees in East Africa.

== Career ==
Owuor became a State Counsel in the Attorney General's Chambers in 1967. She became Kenya's first female magistrate in 1970 and senior magistrate in 1974.

In 1982, Owuor was appointed by President Daniel arap Moi to the High Court of Kenya, the first woman to sit on the bench. In 1983, she was appointed alongside Cecil Miller and Chunilal Madan to the Judicial Commission of Inquiry to investigate corruption allegations against former Attorney General Charles Njonjo.

Owuor was also appointed a goodwill ambassador to UNICEF. In 1993, she was appointed chair of the Task Force on Laws Relating to Women, which resulted in the passage of the 2006 Sexual Offences Act. She was a commissioner on the Kenya Law Reform Commission from 1984 until 2000.

After the NARC government came to power, Owuor was named in Aaron Ringera's report seeking to investigate the judiciary and opted to retire rather than fight malpractice charges. Under the Mwai Kibaki government, she was nominated to the International Criminal Court in 2006 but her appointment was challenged due to her mention in the Ringera report. Owuor withdrew and the position on the bench was taken by fellow female Kenyan judge Joyce Aluoch.

Owuor and Aluoch were the first two members of the Kenya Women's Judges Association, an affiliate of the International Women Judges Association, formed in 1993 when they were the only two female judges in the country.

Owuor retired from the court in 2008, but continues to chair the Sexual Offences Task Force.

== Personal life ==
Owuor was married to research scientist Beneah Majisu, whose sister was married to Amos Wako. They divorced. She has six children.

Owuor was an advocate against customary practices, and she herself was caught up in the Luo custom of widow inheritance when her second husband died. She said, "the Luo community treats widows like dirty people who have to be cleansed before they can integrate into the society once again. As the chairperson of a government task force that is reviewing the legal regime and how it affects women, it is humiliating to be harassed by men when I am still mourning my husband." She refused to be "inherited" by her husband's family.

== Works ==
- Owuor, Effie (2016). "Women and political inclusion in Kenya: a historical overview, 1963–2016". In Japhet Biegon (ed.). Gender equality and political processes in Kenya : challenges and prospects. Strathmore University Press. ISBN 9789966054142.
