= Jasper Abraham murder case =

Trial in Kenya over a 1923 death

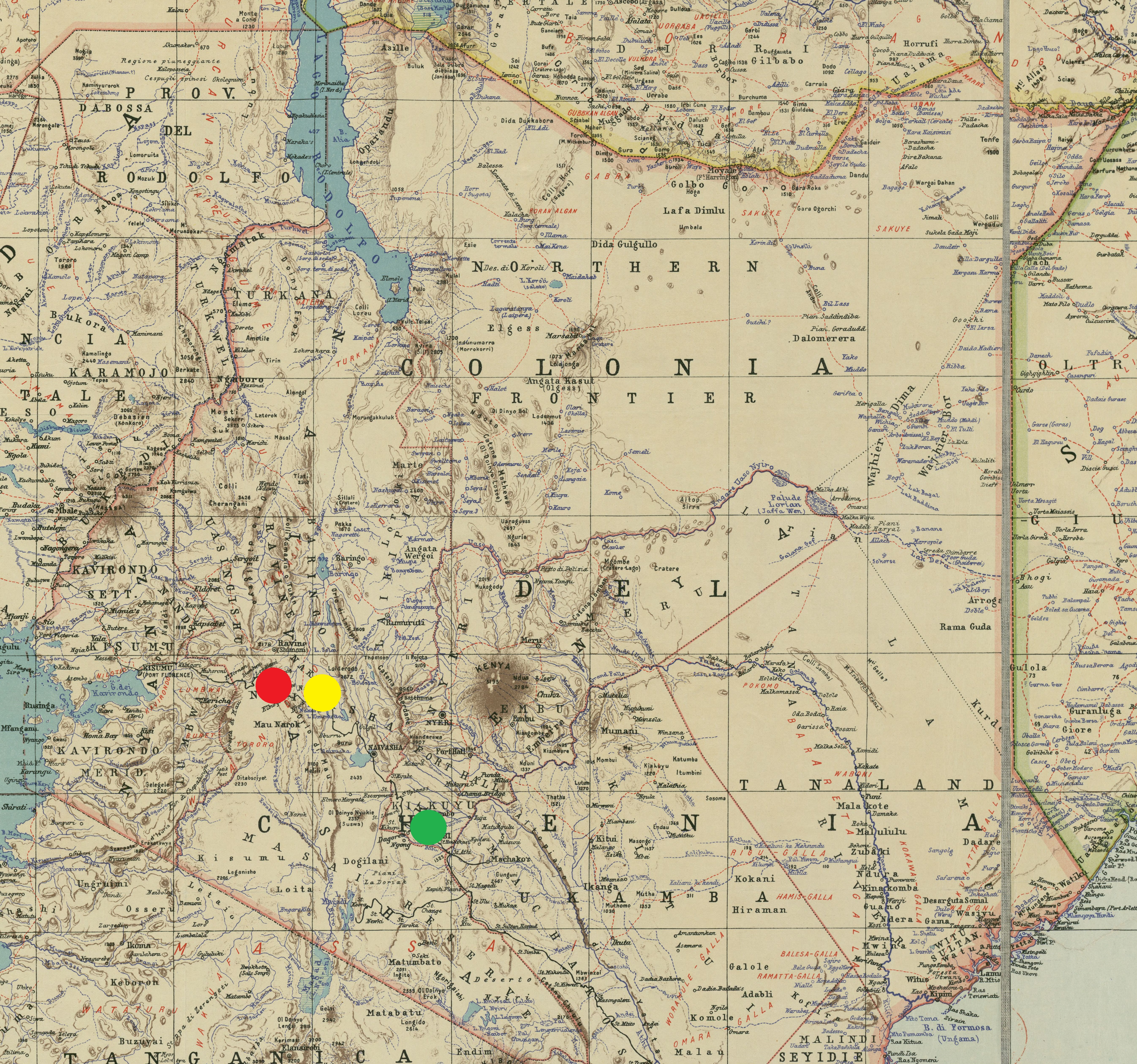
- A 1925 map of Kenya with the locations of the killing at Molo (red), trial at Nakuru (yellow) and the colonial capital of Nairobi (green)
- Location: Kweresoi farm near Molo, Kenya Colony
- Date: 10 June 1923
- Weapon: Leather rein
- Deaths: 1
- Injuries: 0
- Victim: Kitosh
- Assailants: Jasper Abraham, Kimesu arap Killel, Chuma arap Chebule, Bariche arap Chumia
- Charges: Murder
- Verdict: Guilty
- Convictions: Abraham convicted of grievous hurt, the other defendants of simple hurt
- Convicted: June 1923
- Judge: Joseph Alfred Sheridan

In June 1923, British settler Jasper Abraham was tried for the murder of African labourer Kitosh in the Kenya Colony. Kitosh had died after a flogging administered by Abraham and his employees at a farm near the town of Molo, Kenya. The jury, which was all-European and composed of Abraham's acquaintances, found him guilty of a lesser charge of grievous hurt and he was sentenced to two years' imprisonment.

The sentence, widely regarded as overly lenient, brought condemnation from the British government's Colonial Office regarding the way the case had been handled by the colony's judicial system and the continued use of the Indian Penal Code (IPC) in Kenya, which differed significantly from English law in its treatment of homicide. A succession of British secretaries of state attempted to impose legal reform on the colony, though these were resisted by Chief Justice of Kenya Sir Jacob William Barth and Governor Edward Grigg, 1st Baron Altrincham. The IPC was finally replaced in Kenya with a new legal code in 1930.

== Death of Kitosh ==
Jasper Abraham was a British settler in the Kenya Colony. The son of Charles Abraham, the bishop of Derby from 1909 to 1927, he had a high social standing among his fellow settlers. Abraham maintained a farm known as Kweresoi around 27 kilometres (17 mi) from the town of Molo. One of Abraham's employees on the farm was an African labourer known as Kitosh. (Note: Kitosh is possibly a nickname, in which case his real name is unclear. He is recorded by the district surgeon as "Makobe Situma", though some contemporary newspapers referred to him as "Makombe (otherwise Kitosh) of the tribe of Mgishu, Mbale, Uganda" and one witness calls him "Kitondi".) Aged around 30, Kitosh had worked for Abraham for 18 months, though he had tried to escape the farm in April 1923, alleging physical abuse.

On 6 June 1923 Abraham, who was in bed with a back injury, lent one of his horses to a neighbour who was travelling to the railway station at Molo. The horse was pregnant, so Abraham sent Kitosh with instructions to walk it back to the farm. A European settler named Polson said he saw Kitosh riding the horse and striking her in the belly with a stick. Polson stated that he told Kitosh to dismount and walk back to Kweresoi. Polson visited Abraham the next day to relay events to him. Abraham told Polson that he was furious with Kitosh and vowed to "tear up the boy's labour ticket".

Abraham confronted Kitosh on the evening of 10 June. He asked Kitosh who had given him permission to ride and received no answer. Abraham, who by his own admission "flew off the handle", pushed Kitosh into a shed and beat him with a leather rein. Abraham called two African farm labourers to hold Kitosh down whilst he struck him and later for three more men after Kitosh continued to struggle. Abraham had Kitosh spreadeagled over a wagon wheel and flogged him on the buttocks. The attack was witnessed by Abraham's brother Michael and another settler named Powell. Michael and Powell both stated that they saw Abraham administer 15 or 20 blows before they left around dusk. Abraham afterwards continued to beat Kitosh, calling on his workers Kimesu arap Killel and Chuma arap Chebule to each strike him three to four times. Abraham judged that the men were too timid in their flogging and had a third worker, Bariche arap Chumia, take over. After five more strokes from Bariche, Kitosh appeared to faint, but Abraham judged that he was feigning unconsciousness and threw four buckets of water over him.

Kitosh did not awaken and was picked up by Kimesu and Chuma and moved to a store. There Abraham kicked Kitosh in the side twice and ordered him tied to a post before leaving. Abraham later returned to the store to tighten the bindings and ordered his house servants, Sefu bin Namakoyo and Kimnyigue arap Chepkorus to guard the store. Kitosh was left overnight with no food or water and only an old coat for warmth. Sefu untied Kitosh around 2 am and later recalled that the wounded man had said "if I had a knife I would kill myself". Kitosh was sweating and groaning by 3 am and at 4 am asked Sefu to uncover his body and told him that he thought he was about to die. Kitosh died shortly afterwards.

Kimnyigue reported the death to Abraham, who sent a message to Walter Scott, in command of the Molo police station. Abraham's message read "A native named Kitosh whom I had flogged on this farm last night died just now. Would you please come out and investigate". Scott arrived at 2:30 pm and inspected the body in the storeroom. Scott arrested Abraham, Kimesu, Chuma and Bariche. Abraham was released on bail but the African employees were remanded in custody. Scott took Kitosh's body back to Molo in a bullock cart for a post-mortem examination by district surgeon F. L. Henderson.

== Trial of Abraham ==
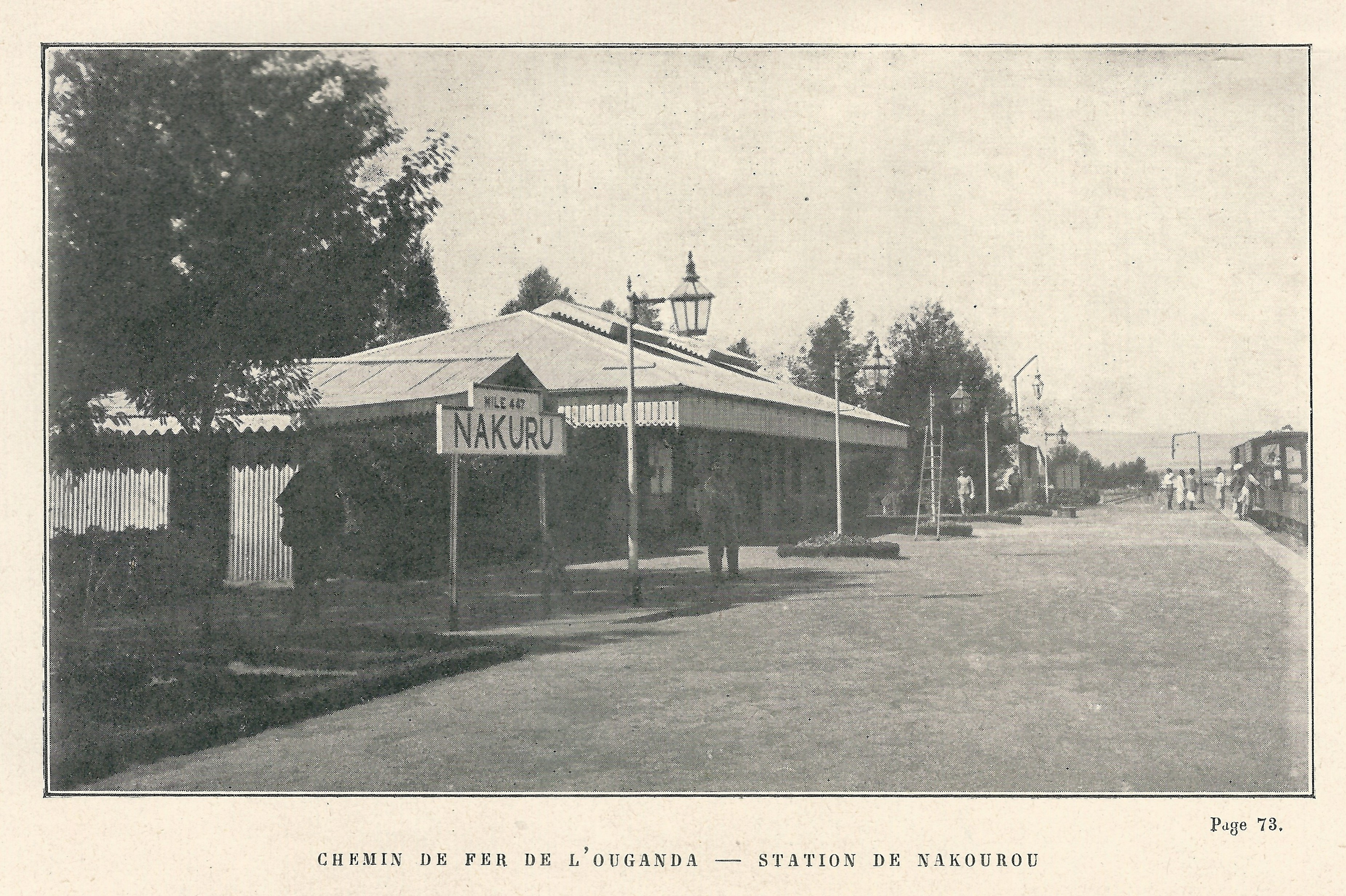
The railway station at Nakuru, pictured in 1913

Abraham and his employees were charged with murder and brought to trial at Nakuru High Court in June, in a case overseen by judge Joseph Alfred Sheridan. The jury was composed of local European settlers who all knew Abraham. The Kenyan Legal Department had raised concern over the impartiality of the jury and suggested the trial be relocated. A request by the Attorney General of Kenya, Robert William Lyall-Grant, to move the trial to the capital, Nairobi, was rejected on the grounds of cost and inconvenience to the witnesses.

At the time of the trial, the law in the colony was that of the Indian Penal Code, which allowed a jury to return lesser charges of manslaughter, grievous hurt, or simple hurt in murder cases. For a murder charge to be proved, the jury must have been certain that there was an intention to kill, to cause injuries "sufficient in the ordinary course of nature to cause death" or that a reasonable person would draw the conclusion that injuries caused were likely to result in death. Grievous hurt was an act that endangered life but lacked the intention to kill. Simple hurt was the intentional causing of any pain. During the trial, Sheridan told the jury that the evidence did not support a murder charge and that they should consider finding on one of the lesser charges only.

Abraham's defence barrister successfully argued for Kitosh's April 1923 escape attempt not to be discussed in court as he thought it would prejudice his case. Abraham claimed in court that "if the boy had admitted his error in riding the mare, no single stroke would have been given". He admitted flogging Kitosh but said that "none of my strokes had much beef behind them – or so I thought". Michael Abraham said "I did not consider it cruel; it was a similar beating to what I myself received when I was a kid".

Henderson, who was an experienced surgeon and well respected by the police, described that he found deep internal bruising on Kitosh's body and described the wounds to the man's buttocks as of a severity he had never seen. He also noted Kitosh had not eaten in the 20 hours before his death. Henderson stated that the injuries inflicted were capable of causing death and, in his opinion, had caused the death, potentially by shock.

The defence counsel called two local general practitioners to provide medical evidence, Arthur John Jex-Blake and Gerald Victor Wright Anderson. The GPs gave the opinion that the wounds to Kitosh had been caused during the transfer of his body to Molo. They also thought that Kitosh had been weakened by hunger and had therefore succumbed to his injuries sooner than Abraham could have predicted. They additionally argued that "the native's state of mind" should be considered as contributing to his death, arguing that he had "lost the will to live". The GPs asserted that Africans could die of their own accord if they wished to do so and the death should be thought of as a kind of suicide. Henderson argued against these points noting that, having carried out more than 100 post-mortems, he had never seen a death caused by the deceased's "will to die" alone. Sheridan noted that the GPs had not examined Kitosh's body and while "Henderson has completed hundreds of post-mortem examinations on Africans, Blake and Anderson not one between them".

The jury convicted Abraham of grievous hurt. In passing sentence Sheridan noted that "this case is more particularly serious having regard to the previous cases of Watts, Hawkins and Harries". Despite this, Sheridan gave the minimum possible sentence for the offence, two years' imprisonment. (Note: The maximum sentence available to Sheridan for a conviction of grievous hurt was seven years' imprisonment and a fine.) Abraham's three African employees were found guilty of simple hurt but this was judged to be on a technicality as they had been following Abraham's orders. The men were each sentenced to one day's imprisonment and, having served two months in remand, were immediately released.

== Reactions and reform ==
At the conclusion of the case Sheridan commended the jury for their efforts in trying a man "intimately known to many of them" in a report to the British Colonial Office. Lyall-Grant was advised by the Kenyan police that local opinion was that the verdict was "exceedingly hard luck on Abraham". Lengthy floggings were common in Kenya at the time, particularly in cases concerning livestock, which held high value to farmers at this early stage of settlement. Around the time of the verdict the Legal Department's Native Punishments Commission reported that the settlers were in favour of more draconian laws against black Kenyans, particularly for labour-related offences. The receipt of this report, which included supporting opinions from colonial officials and magistrates, alarmed the Colonial Office in London. The Abraham case raised concern in the Colonial Office over the conduct of the colony's legal officials. Following the similar Watts and Hawkins cases, the legal system of the colony was under scrutiny. The Abraham case would mark the beginning of the end for the application of the Indian Penal Code to Kenya Colony.

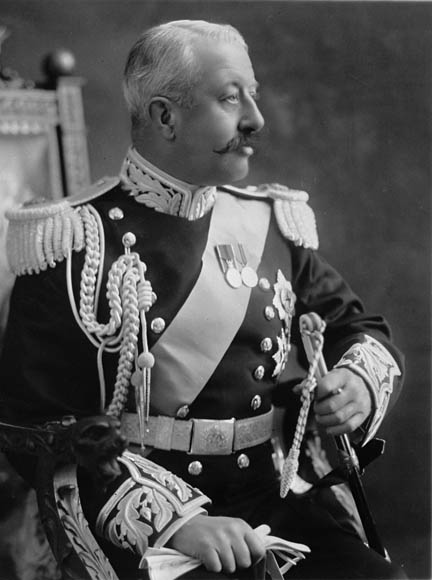
Cavendish, pictured around the time of the First World War

It took the governor of Kenya, Robert Coryndon, two months to transmit details of the Abraham trial to the Colonial Office. The Secretary of State for the Colonies, Victor Cavendish, 9th Duke of Devonshire, responded in December criticising the Kenyan judiciary for its actions in a "crime which appears to me to offer no extenuating circumstances" and noting that he considered the case ought to have been found to be manslaughter as a minimum. With regard to how the jury system was managed, Cavendish noted that "I share the reluctance of my predecessors to interfere with an institution which is so closely bound up with British traditions of justice: but it is clear that in the special conditions of Kenya the working of the system requires to be carefully watched". In a later dispatch Cavendish asked why the colony had disregarded a Colonial Office order of 1913 that required Europeans to be tried by a jury drawn from outside the locality. The Colonial Office considered that the court in the Abraham case had failed to respect the medical evidence provided by Henderson and that Sheridan had misused his discretion in awarding a light sentence. Lyall-Grant agreed that a verdict of homicide was to have been expected under English law, but that the verdict of grievous hurt was not unusual under the Indian Penal Code. He told the Colonial Office that he thought similar cases in the future would see more severe sentences handed down, but the British government doubted this.

Cavendish considered the treatment of homicide by the Indian Penal Code insufficient and ordered Lyall-Grant to draw up local ordinance to bring procedures more into line with the English legal model used in other colonies. Cavendish also questioned why the threat by Abraham to tear up Kitosh's labour card had not been brought up in court, as doing so would have been a crime. He considered that the counsel, judge and jury considered such a threat acceptable and common practice. As a means of embarrassing the colonial officials, Cavendish requested details of all cases where such threats had been prosecuted, knowing that there were none. In his replies to Cavendish, Coryndon defended his legal officials, the independence of the Kenyan courts and the jury system. He restated the medical evidence in the case, implying that the Colonial Office had misunderstood it. Cavendish's undersecretary William Ormsby-Gore proposed recalling Sheridan to indicate the British government's displeasure at the colony's handling of the case and Cavendish at one stage considered abolishing jury trials in the colony.

Cavendish left office following the 1923 United Kingdom general election, which resulted in a hung parliament. He was replaced in January 1924 by J. H. Thomas, a member of the first Labour government. Thomas ordered that Kenyan courts begin recording full transcripts for all proceedings of serious crimes where the defendants were European in origin. He also ordered that trials be held outside the home district of the defendant and that the Kenyan Attorney-General closely monitor the operation of the jury system in the colony. The Chief Justice of Kenya, Sir Jacob William Barth, opposed these measures, which he thought interfered with the proper operation of the legal system.

The October 1924 United Kingdom general election returned the Conservative Party to power and Thomas' replacement, Leo Amery, pursued the case for legal reform in Kenya. In a December dispatch he asked what steps had been taken in the colony to discourage the use of corporal punishment by employers. The administration delayed its reply for nine months, reluctant to act at a time when the colony was suffering from labour shortages. The response stated that a change in policy on corporal punishment would "serve no useful purpose" as the practice of flogging would "decrease as natives become more aware of their legal rights and remedies". Amery's response, addressed to Edward Grigg, who had replaced an unwell Coryndon in October 1925, ordered that a public statement be made by the colonial government against corporal punishment. Grigg was swayed by lobbying from the settlers and refused to do so.

With Grigg's opposition, widescale change did not occur until 1930 when the Colonial Office ordered that the Indian Penal Code be replaced with a system based on English law. After this point Kenyan juries occasionally returned unexpected verdicts, but with the discretion allowed by the Indian Penal Code's treatment of homicide removed, these became less common. The administration of Governor Joseph Byrne (1931–38) saw settlers receiving less lenient treatment and legal reforms brought in that reduced the discretion allowed to judges on sentencing. Kenyan settler opinion remained in favour of "rough justice" to Africans for decades and it became a factor in the 1950s Mau Mau rebellion.

== Legacy ==
Abraham served as inspiration for the character of Louis Schultz in Nora K. Strange's 1928 novel Kenya Dawn. Schultz is a brutal Dutch settler who kills an African and attempts to rape a European woman. The killing of Kitosh is portrayed in Danish-Kenyan novelist Karen Blixen's Kitosch's [sic] Story, part of her 1937 work Out of Africa. Blixen's account of the case romanticised Kitosh's killing and accepted the theory of his intent to commit suicide, but does not wholly exonerate Abraham.

The British MP Rennie Smith asked Ormsby-Gore, on 29 November 1926, whether Abraham had been brought to trial for another assault on an African, as he had been informed. Amery replied, on 24 February 1927, that this was not the case and that he had maintained a clean criminal record since the case. Amery also stated that Grigg had told him Abraham was "doing his utmost to retrieve his character". The Europeans In East Africa database records that Abraham died in Kenya in 1943.

== Sources ==
- Anderson, David M. (September 2011). "Punishment, Race and 'The Raw Native': Settler Society and Kenya's Flogging Scandals, 1895–1930". Journal of Southern African Studies. 37 (3): 479–497. doi:10.1080/03057070.2011.602887. S2CID 143999794.
- Kjældgaard, Lasse Horne (1 October 2019). "Death from Torture as a Thing of Beauty? Karen Blixen and Kitosch's Story". Scandinavian Studies. 91 (3): 345–370. doi:10.5406/scanstud.91.3.0345. S2CID 167170250.
- Nicholls, Christine Stephanie (2005). Red Strangers: The White Tribe of Kenya. Timewell Press. ISBN 978-1-85725-206-4.
- O'Shea, Helen (2016). "Irish Legal Geographies in the Era of Emergency: Independent Ireland, Colonial Kenya, and the British Colonial Legal Service". Éire-Ireland. 51 (1–2): 243–265. doi:10.1353/eir.2016.0011. ISSN 1550-5162. S2CID 159941647.
- Wiener, Martin J. (8 December 2008). An Empire on Trial: Race, Murder, and Justice under British Rule, 1870–1935. Cambridge University Press. ISBN 978-1-139-47344-6.
- Williams, Elizabeth W. (July 2017), Sexual Trusteeship: Constructing Race and Sexuality in Colonial Kenya, 1885–1963 (PDF) (PhD thesis), University of Minnesota
