= Watts and Betchart murder case =

1918 event in British East Africa

- Location: British East Africa Protectorate (present-day Kenya)
- Date: 2 April 1918 - 10 April 1918
- Weapons: Kiboko whip, fire
- Deaths: 1
- Victim: Mutunga
- Perpetrators: Henry Watts, Cyprian Betchart
- Verdict: Guilty on less serious charges

Harry Watts, a European settler, operated a farm in the British East Africa Protectorate. On 2 April 1918, he was summoned by two black employees who had caught a black Kenyan named Mutunga, apparently in the act of stealing a bag of flour from the farm. Watts beat Mutunga with a kiboko whip, leaving him seriously wounded. He ordered his farm manager Cyprian Betchart, another European, to take Mutunga to the police station. Betchart instead tied him up in his house before carrying him away later that night and attempting to burn his body. The fire was seen by a black Kenyan who alerted the police, who arrested the two Europeans on murder charges.

An Asian police surgeon determined Mutunga had suffered multiple injuries but had died by strangulation. Watts and Betchart were tried at the High Court in September. Their defence lawyer attempted to discredit the police surgeon and the black witnesses. The all-European jury returned not-guilty verdicts on the murder charges and found each man guilty only on less serious charges of hurt. The men received fines of 1,000 shillings. In Britain the sentence was considered lenient, and the Colonial Office demanded a report from the colonial authorities. East African attorney general Jacob William Barth considered that juries in Kenya were biased in favour of Europeans. After several other cases and further pressure from Britain, legal reform was finally achieved in 1930 by removing the Indian Penal Code laws that permitted juries to return lesser charges in murder cases.

== Background ==
Harry Watts was born in London and served as a farrier sergeant with the British Army during the Second Boer War. He remained in Africa at the war's end in 1902 and hiked to the East Africa Protectorate by 1907. Watts maintained a dairy herd and grew flax on land in the Molo area of Nakuru District. A contemporary, Victor Kane, also alleged that Watts was an ivory poacher and thief who robbed Somali caravans transporting ivory from Ethiopia to Nairobi. Kane described Watts as "a rough, tougher than an unpolished diamond, he drank whisky and smoked 'King Stork' cigarettes both in excess". By 1918, Watts employed a farm manager, another European named Cyprian Betchart (surname sometimes rendered as Betschart or Betschhart).

== Death of Mutunga ==
On the night of 2 April 1918, two of Watts' black employees, Ogola Osewa and Kipkoske arap Juma, apprehended a black man named Mutunga, apparently in the act of stealing a bag of flour from Watts' mill. They summoned Watts who proceeded to question Mutunga and beat him with a kiboko whip. After three sessions of flogging, interspersed with dunkings in a river, Mutunga provided Watts with the names of other men who he said had also stolen from Watts.

Mutunga was by this time seriously wounded. Watts instructed Betchart to take Mutunga to the police station and returned to his home. Betchart decided that the transport of Mutunga could wait until morning and ordered Ogola and Kipkoske to take Mutunga to Betchart's house. At the house, a two-roomed shack that Betchart shared with his cook Amino wa Maloa, Mutunga was tied spread-eagled below Betchart's bed. At 2 am Amino awoke to see Betchart carrying Mutunga outside over his shoulder. Amino noted that Mutunga's bindings had been cut with a knife and that Betchart returned to his house half an hour later.

It is not certain at what point Mutunga died. It is possible he was dead by the time he was tied under Betchart's bed or survived until later. On 10 April Betchart took Ogola to a railway embankment where Ogola saw that the body of Mutunga had been left. The two men built a fire from wood, grass, and kerosene (that Betchart had brought with him) and set fire to Mutunga's remains before returning to Watts' farm.

== Discovery, arrests and trial ==
About an hour after Betchart and Ogola left the embankment, the smoke from the fire was spotted by Kipsony arap Mania, who was walking along the railway. Kipsony discovered Mutunga's remains and alerted the police. The police soon identified the corpse and arrested Watts and Betchart. A post-mortem by South Asian police sub-assistant surgeon Wilayatt Shah determined strangulation was the cause of death but noted multiple injuries resulting from a severe beating.

The case, Crown vs 1. H.E. Watts and 2. C.S.L. Betchart, was tried at the High Court, sitting at Nakuru, between 4 and 8 September 1918. The case was presided over by Judge Maxwell; the jury consisted of nine Europeans, all district residents.

Watts and Betchart did not attempt to deny much of the prosecution case, though their counsel attempted to discredit Shah and to exploit contradiction in the evidence of African witnesses. These actions were noted by Maxwell in his summing-up.

At the time of the trial, the law in the protectorate was that of the Indian Penal Code, which allowed a jury to return lesser charges of manslaughter, grievous hurt, or simple hurt in murder cases. For a murder charge to be proved, the jury must be certain that there was an intention to kill, to cause injuries "sufficient in the ordinary course of nature to cause death" or that a reasonable person would draw the conclusion that injuries caused were likely to result in death. Grievous hurt was an act that endangered life but without the intention to kill. Simple hurt was the intentional causing of any pain.

The jury did not find either man guilty of murder and returned guilty verdicts only on the less serious hurt charges. Maxwell fined each man 1,000 shillings and additionally bound Betchart over for 12 months.

== Legal reform ==
The verdict and sentence were both considered lenient at the time, and the British Colonial Office demanded a full report from the colonial government. The protectorate's Legal Department carried out an enquiry. Judge Maxwell stated that he thought the jury could only have reached its verdicts by discounting the evidence of all of the black witnesses. The attorney general of East Africa, Jacob William Barth, considered that European juries in the colony gave excessive benefit of the doubt to Europeans on trial, he wrote to the colony's chief secretary and noted that "A jury ... is very prone in this country ... to give a European accused the benefits of any possible contradiction that can be made to the evidence of native witnesses for the Crown" The British Anti-Slavery and Aborigines' Protection Society wrote to the Colonial Office over the case.

The Watts and Betchart case was followed by other murder trials similar in nature and result, such as that of Langley Hawkins in 1920 and Jasper Abraham in 1923. These cases raised concern in London over the widespread practice in the colony of Europeans flogging their black employees. Successive Secretaries of State for the Colonies wrote to governors of Kenya to attempt to restrict the practice, to little avail as the governors tended to side with the settlers who were in favour of its continuance. The Devonshire White Paper of 1923 ordered that the interests of black Kenyans be placed above those of European settlers, but had little practical effect.

Eventually legal reform was achieved with continued pressure from the Colonial Office. The Indian Penal Code was replaced in 1930, and its peculiar treatment of murder and battery charges was removed, reducing the scope for juries to show leniency to men accused of murder. Later reforms under Governor Sir Joseph Byrne, which made him unpopular among the European settler population, reduced the discretion available to judges on sentencing. European public opinion in the colony remained firmly in favour of the harsh treatment of black Kenyans for decades.

== Fate of Watts and Betchart ==
Betchart later worked for a British merchant company at Kisumu. He died on 3 June 1933 at Kakamega. The author C. S. Nicholls in Red Strangers: the White Tribe of Kenya (2005) states that Watts was involved in a second case of alleged murder of a black man, of which he was acquitted. He died in 1947, during a trip to England.
