= Subordinate courts of Kenya =

Court system in Kenya

The Subordinate Courts of Kenya are courts subordinate to Kenya's High Court, established under Article 169 of the Constitution of Kenya 2010.

They include the Magistrates' Court, the Kadhis' Courts, the Courts Martial the Small Claims Court (Kenya), and any other court or local tribunal established by an Act of Parliament.

== Jurisdiction ==
The jurisdiction of these courts varies. The Magistrates' court has jurisdiction over criminal and civil matters as derived from the Criminal Procedure Code (Cap.75 of the Laws of Kenya) or other written laws. The court also hears matters arising from traffic offenses as per the Traffic Act.

The jurisdiction of the Kadhis' Court is limited to matters related to Islamic laws such as personal status including marriage, divorce or inheritance. For a case to be heard at this court, the involved parties must be adherents of the Islamic religion and willing to have their case heard under the jurisdiction of the Kadhis' Courts.

The Courts Martial is a military court with jurisdiction over matters involving members of the Kenya Defense Forces.

Established by the Small Claims Court Act 2 of 2016 as a subordinate Court, the Small Claims Court adjudicates claims not exceeding one million shillings. The court has jurisdiction to hear and determine civil claims related to contracts, money held or received, liability in tort law, compensation for injury or counterclaims in contracts.

Tribunals are bodies established by Acts of Parliament to exercise judicial or quasi-judicial functions. They supplement ordinary courts in the administration of justice. Tribunals have no penal jurisdiction and operate mostly under the High Court's supervision.

Matters arising from Subordinate Courts can be appealed to the High Court.

== Organization and administration ==
Section 10 of the Judicial Service Act establishes the Office of the Registrar Subordinate Courts. The office is tasked with coordinating support for Magistrates' and Kadhis' courts by strengthening existing infrastructure and recommending good practices.

=== Courts ===
The subordinate courts of Kenya are structured to include

- Magistrates' Courts
- Courts Martial
- Kadhis' Courts
- The Small Claims Court
- Other court or local tribunal as may be established by an Act of Parliament

== Composition ==
A magistrates' court is considered duly constituted when presided over by a Chief Magistrate, a senior principal magistrate, a principal magistrate, a senior resident magistrate or a resident magistrate as prescribed by the Magistrates’ Courts Act.

According to Article 170 of the Constitution of Kenya, a Kadhi's Court shall have a Chief Kadhi and at least three other Kadhis in accordance with an Act of Parliament.

The Court Martial consists of a Judge Advocate (a practiced magistrate or an advocate for at least ten years appointed by the Chief Justice who acts as the presiding officer; and at least five other members appointed by the Defence Court-martial Administrator in the case of an officer being tried, and not less than three other members in other cases.

== See also ==
- The Judicial Service Commission
