= Magistrates' Court (Kenya) =

Subordinate court in Kenya

The Magistrates' Court of Kenya is a Subordinate court established under Article 169 1(a) of Kenya's 2010 Constitution.

The Court is subordinate to the High Court and is presided over by either a chief magistrate, a senior principal magistrate, a principal magistrate, a senior resident magistrate, or a resident magistrate.

== Jurisdiction ==
The Magistrates' court has both civil and criminal jurisdiction.

The court has jurisdiction over criminal matters and derives its powers from the Criminal Procedure Code (Cap.75 of the Laws of Kenya) or any other written Law. This court also has jurisdiction to hear and determine matters arising from traffic offenses as provided for by the Traffic Act, Cap. 403 of the Laws of Kenya.

The court also exercises jurisdiction over civil matters. This function is, however, limited to matters in which the value of the disputed subject does not exceed Ksh 20 million for a chief magistrate, 15 million for senior principal magistrate, 10 million for a principal magistrate, 7 million for a senior resident magistrate, and 5 million for a resident magistrate.

This jurisdiction includes claims relating to succession; marriage, divorce, maintenance or dowry; adultery; status of widows and children such guardianship, adoption, custody, and legitimacy; land held under African customary tenure; environment disputes; violation of the human rights provided under Article 25 (a) and (b) of the Constitution of Kenya; employment and labor relations; and contempt of court.

== Specialized Courts ==
The Magistrates' Court of Kenya is further split into Specialized Courts that hear and determine cases in other specific areas.

=== Children's Court ===
Children's Courts are established under section 73 of the Children's Act to hear and determine matters concerning children including parental responsibility, child custody and support, giving orders for children in need of protection and care, and children in conflict with the law. The courts, however, do not handle matters concerning murder or where children have been charged alongside adults.

Although all Magistrates' courts in Kenya handle matters involving children, the Milimani Children's Court located at the Milimani Law Courts and the Tononoka Children's Court, based at the Tononoka Law Courts are specifically established to handle cases involving children.

In November 2023 Chief Justice Martha Koome, declared November to be a National Children's Service Month in all court stations to fast track cases involving children, and launched the first such event at the Tononoka Law Courts.

=== Anti-corruption and Economic Crimes Court ===
The Anti-corruption and Economic Crimes Court is a specialized court located at Forodha House, Upper Hill, Nairobi. This court is established to ensure effective management of corruption and economic crimes cases.

=== Counter-Terrorism Court ===
The counter-terrorism courts, located at the Shanzu and Kahawa Sukari Law Courts are established and specialized to deal with matters involving terrorism.

=== Jomo Kenyatta International Airport Court (JKIA) Court ===
The JKIA Court is a special court established to deal with matters involving drugs, human trafficking, and other cases that may arise at the Airport. Established in 2016, the court also handles matters concerning immigration offenses and wildlife trafficking.

=== Sexual and Gender Based Violence (SGBV) Court ===
The first specialized SGBV court was established at the Shanzu Law Courts in 2022.

=== Mobile Court ===
To avail justice in remote areas, the Judiciary of Kenya operates mobiles courts. Court sessions are conducted by magistrates, prosecutors, police, and other court officials who travel to affected areas and conduct court sessions.

== See also ==
- The Judiciary of Kenya
- The Judicial Service Commission
