= 2003 Kenya Puisne Judges Tribunal =

The 2003 Kenya Puisne Judges Tribunal was a Tribunal setup on 10 December 2003 to investigate the Conduct Of Puisne Judges of the High Court of Kenya following the 2003 Ringera Judiciary Report.

== Terms of Reference ==
President Mwai Kibaki established a tribunal which was to investigate the conduct the following judges:

- Daniel K.S. Aganyanya
- Tom Mbaluto
- A. Mbogholi Msagha
- Roselyne Nambuye
- J.V Odero Juma
- J. Kasanga Mulwa

The tribunal was to investigate the allegations that the said Puisne Judges have been involved in corruption, unethical practices and absence of integrity in the performance of the functions of their office a report with recommendations to the President.

In the meantime, the Judges were to stand suspended from exercising the functions of their office.

== Membership ==
The tribunal consisted of:

- Justice (Rtd) Abdul Majid Cockar,
- Justice John Mwera
- Justice Leonard Njagi
- Justice Daniel Musinga
- Justice Isaack Lenaola

== See also ==
- Court of Appeal of Kenya
- High Court of Kenya
