= 2003 Kenya Appeal Judges Tribunal =

The 2003 Kenya Appeal Judges Tribunal was a tribunal set up on 15 October 2003 to investigate the conduct of appellate judges of the Court of Appeal of Kenya following the 2003 Ringera Judiciary Report.

== Terms of reference ==
President Mwai Kibaki established a tribunal which was to investigate the conduct the following judges:

- Richard Otieno Kwach
- Amaritral B. Shah
- A.A. Lakha
- Moijo M. ole Keiwua
- Effie Owuor
- Philip. N. Waki

The tribunal was to investigate the allegations that the judges were involved in corruption, unethical practices and absence of integrity in the performance of the functions of their office make a report with recommendations to the president.

The judges were suspended from exercising the functions of their office during the tribunal's investigation. The decisions of the tribunal were appealed and some of the judges reinstated. The tribunal was also sued by some of the judges who were being investigated.

== Membership ==
The tribunal consisted of:

- Justice (Rtd) Akilano Molande Akiwumi
- Justice (Rtd) Abdul Majid Cockar
- Justice Benjamin Patrick Kubo
- Philip Nzamba Kitonga
- William Shirley Deverell

The tribunal was to be supported by Mbuthi Gathenji as assisting counsel and Margaret Nzioka as secretary. The two court clerks attached to the tribunal were Michael Mkala Maghanga and Stephen Ngugi.

== See also ==
- Court of Appeal of Kenya
- High Court of Kenya
