= Langley Hawkins murder case =

1920 court case in British East Africa

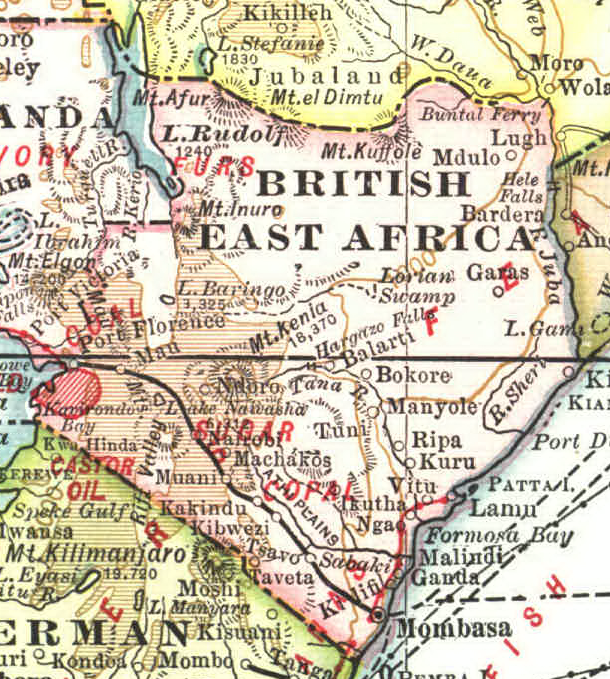
- Map of the East Africa Protectorate
- Location: Kiambu County, East Africa Protectorate (present-day Kenya)
- Date: 5 May 1920
- Deaths: 1 (+ a related suicide)
- Injuries: 3
- Perpetrator: Langley Hawkins
- Charges: One count of murder, three counts of grievous hurt
- Judge: Thomas Doveton Maxwell

In May 1920, white European settler Langley Hawkins discovered money and documents were missing from his house in Kiambu County in the British East Africa Protectorate. He summoned a Black African policeman from nearby Ruiru and the pair proceeded to beat and torture three of Hawkins' black male employees and a pregnant black woman to extract information relating to the theft. One of the employees, Mucheru, died during the torture and the woman later miscarried.

The policeman, Kisanda, died by suicide, but Hawkins was brought to trial on one count of murder and three of grievous hurt. A male all-white jury returned one guilty verdict for grievous hurt and two on lesser charges of simple hurt. Hawkins received a sentence of two years' imprisonment, relatively harsh for the offences he was convicted of but much less than would be expected had Hawkins been convicted on more serious charges.

The case was one of a number of similar outcomes that raised concern in the British Colonial Office over the widespread practice of flogging by European settlers in Kenya. Numerous attempts at reform eventually saw the replacement of the colony's Indian Penal Code and other measures to restrict the discretion allowed to juries and judges in murder and battery cases.

== Incident ==
Langley Hawkins was a settler, of European descent, in Kiambu County of the East Africa Protectorate (present-day Kenya). On 5 May 1920 he discovered money and documents were missing from his home. Hawkins alerted his nearest police station at Ruiru and a black Kenyan policeman, Kisanda, was dispatched. Hawkins and Kisanda detained three of Hawkins' black employees: Mucheru, Richu and Kamanyu.

The three men were subsequently interrogated, beaten and tortured by Kisanda, sometimes assisted by Hawkins. The torture included the crushing of their fingers in a vice. A pregnant black woman was also "thrashed" by Hawkins, in an attempt to extract information. The woman later miscarried. On 8 May, Mucheru died.

== Trial ==
The case was widely reported in the local press and a subscription was raised among European settlers to meet the cost of a trial. The case was brought before the High Court in August 1920 at Nairobi under Judge Thomas Doveton Maxwell. Hawkins was charged with one count of murder and three of grievous hurt. Kisanda had killed himself before the case began, apparently driven to do so out of regret and fear over his future.

Kenya at that time, unusually for a British territory in Africa, operated under the Indian Penal Code. This allowed a sliding scale of homicide and battery charges. For a charge of murder to be proved the code required that the jury be certain that there was an intention to kill, to cause injuries "sufficient in the ordinary course of nature to cause death" or that a reasonable person would draw the conclusion that injuries caused were likely to result in death. For manslaughter the same test was required, though without the intent to kill. Grievous hurt was an act of physical harm that endangered life and simple hurt was a lesser charge, that of the intentional causing of any pain.

During the trial Maxwell described Hawkins' actions as "utterly heartless, callous brutality". However the entirely European and male jury returned guilty verdicts only on one charge of grievous hurt and two of simple hurt. Maxwell noted in his summing-up that the evidence against Hawkins might have been more damning if Kisanda had survived to testify. Perhaps mindful of recent criticism from the press and Colonial Office for lenient sentencing in similar cases, such as the 1918 Watts and Betchart murder case for which the men received only a fine on a conviction for grievous hurt, Maxwell imposed a custodial sentence. He imposed two concurrent jail terms, amounting to an overall sentence of two years of "rigorous" imprisonment.

== Aftermath ==
The Hawkins case and similar cases such as that of Watts and Betchart in 1918 and Jasper Abraham in 1923, raised concern in London over the widespread practice in Kenya of Europeans flogging their black employees. Successive Secretaries of State for the Colonies wrote to governors of Kenya to attempt to restrict the practice, to little avail as the governors sided with the settlers. The Devonshire White Paper of 1923 ordered that the interests of black Kenyans be placed above those of European settlers, but had little practical effect.

Eventually legal reform was achieved with pressure from the Colonial Office. The Indian Penal Code was replaced in 1930 and its peculiar treatment of murder and battery charges removed, reducing the scope for juries to show leniency to men accused of murder. Later reforms under Governor Sir Joseph Byrne, which made him unpopular among the European population, reduced the discretion available to judges on sentencing. European public opinion in the colony remained strongly in favour of harsh treatment to black Kenyans for decades.
