= Chief Registrar of the Kenya Judiciary =

Constitutional office in Kenya

The Chief Registrar of the Judiciary is a constitutional office established under Article 161 (2) (c) of the Constitution of Kenya 2010. The Chief Registrar is appointed by the Judicial Service Commission. Under the repealed Constitution, the office was known as the Registrar of the High Court.

The current Chief Registrar is Winfridah Boyani Mokaya who took office on 25 March 2024.

== Functions of the Chief Registrar ==
The Constitution identifies the Chief Registrar as the chief administrator and accounting officer of the Judiciary. In this role, the Chief Registrar works closely with the Chief Justice in the management of the Judiciary. The Chief Registrar is also designated under the Constitution as the Secretary to the Judicial Service Commission (JSC).

The Chief Registrar of the Judiciary is also assigned additional roles by various statutes such as the Judicial Service Act and the Advocates Act which bestows on the Chief Registrar the role of issuing annual Practicing Certificates to Advocates. Under the Judicial Service Act, the Chief Registrar is the Secretary to the National Council for the Administration of Justice (NCAJ).

== Office holders ==
Registrars, HM Court of Appeal for the East African Protectorate and the High Court of East Africa

1. Robert William Hamilton (1897 - 1899)
2. George Francis McDaniel Ennis (1899 - 1900)
3. Skinner Turner (1901)
4. Bamanji D. Talati (1905)
5. Hugh Owen Dolbey (1905)
6. Framrose P. Doctor (1906)
7. Hugh Owen Dolbey (1906)
8. J. W. H. Parkinson (1906)
9. Warren Samuel Leonard Wright (1909 - 1917)
10. A. E. Sockett (1917)
11. S. H. Greville Smith (1918)
12. J. F. St A. Fawcett (1919 - 1920)

Registrars, HM Court of Appeal for the Eastern Africa and the Supreme Court of Kenya

1. L. Lloyd-Blood (1921 - 22/24)
2. B. Stone (1923)
3. D Edwards (1925 - 1927)
4. Edward. J. O'Farrell (1928)
5. Murray M. Jack (1929 - 33)
6. Edward. J. O'Farrell (1934 - 47)
7. Dennis Freke Shaylor (1947 - 1950)
8. Gertrude Joyce Rugg Gunn (1950)
9. B. Allin (1950)
10. Edward Ralph Harley (1950 – 1951)
11. Dennis Freke Shaylor (1951 – 1952)
12. Thomas Richie Penny (1952 – 1955)
13. H. F. Hamel (1955 - 56)
14. Derek Moreton Hornby (1957 – 1962)
15. Kenneth Spicer Few (1962 - 1963)

Registrar of the High Court

1. George Waddell (1964 - 1967)
2. A. A. Kneller (1968)
3. John Robert McReady (3 August 1968 - 1970)
4. N. A. P. Methven (1970)
1. John Robert McReady ( August 1968 - 1970)
2. James Onyiego Nyarangi (17 June 1970 – 10 May 1972)
3. Zaccheus Chesoni (11 May 1972 – 16 Jan 1974)
4. Vijay Kapila ( 17 Jan 1974 – 1978)
5. Sardar Pritam Singh Brar (1 Jan 1978 – 22 Sept 1981)
6. Jamnandas Somabhai Patel (22 Sept 1981 – 29 Dec 1983)
7. Abdul Rauf Samnakay (30 Dec 1983 – 18 Oct 1984)
8. John Wycliffe Mwalati Mwera (19 October 1984 – 1990)
9. Jacob Letia Ole Kipury (20 Feb 1990 – 1 March 2002)
10. William Ouko (4 March 2002 – 2004)
11. Charles Njai (22 April 2004 – 15 Nov 2007)
12. Christine Meoli (16 Nov 2007 – 27 Feb 2008)
13. Lydiah Achode (28 Feb 2008 – 22 Aug 2011)

Chief Registrar of the Judiciary

1. Gladys Boss Shollei (22 August 2011 – October 2013)
2. Hon. Anne A. Amadi (13 Jan 2014 – 12 Jan 2024)
3. Paul Ndemo Maina (Acting) (13 Jan 2024 - 25 March 2024)
4. Wilfridah Boyani Mokaya (25 March 2024 - present)
