= Bernard Chunga Tribunal =

The Bernard Chunga Tribunal was a tribunal set up to investigate the then Chief Justice Bernard Chunga.

== Terms of reference ==
President Mwai Kibaki established a tribunal which was going to probe allegations that he:

- had planned, condoned and carried out torture;
- had been corrupt;
- had interfered with judges.

== Membership ==
The tribunal consisted of:

- Speaker of the National Assembly Francis ole Kaparo
- Retired judge Justice Majid Cockar
- Judge of the Court of Appeal Justice Richard O. Kwach
- Chairman Public Service Commission Eng. Abdulahi Sharawe
- Senior Counsel Gibson Kamau Kuria.

== Resignation ==
Justice Chunga resigned prior to facing the tribunal.

== See also ==
- Chief Justice of Kenya
- Court of Appeal of Kenya
- High Court of Kenya
