= Patricia Nyaundi =

Kenyan high court judge

Hon. Lady Justice Patricia Nyaundi

Judge of the High Court of Kenya
- Incumbent
- Assumed office 2022

Personal details
- Born: Busia , Kenya
- Education: University of Nairobi (LLB); Kenya School of Law (Postgraduate Diploma); University of Cape Town (LL.M)
- Occupation: Judge
- Profession: Lawyer

Patricia Mande Nyaundi is a Kenyan lawyer currently serving as Judge of the High Court of Kenya. She was appointed in 2022 by the Judicial Service Commission. She has previously served as the CEO of both the Truth, Justice and Reconciliation Commission of Kenya and the Kenya National Commission on Human Rights.

During the 2026 Ebola epidemic, a proposal between the United States and Kenya to open an Ebola quarantine facility on Laikipia Air Base intended to only treat American patients was temporarily halted by Nyaundi. In a June court ruling, Nyaundi blocked the operation of Ebola facilities in Kenya by any foreign government and the admittance of anyone exposed to or infected with Ebola into the country.

== Early life and education ==
Nyaundi was born in Busia County, Kenya. She received her law degree from the University of Nairobi, her postgraduate diploma from the Kenya School of Law. and her Master's of Law Degree in Human Rights from the University of Cape Town.

== Career ==
Nyaundi was admitted to the bar in 1991 and became Senior Counsel in 2020.

She was the executive director of the Federation of Women Lawyers (FIDA), a non-profit organisation that provided legal assistance to women in domestic abuse cases. In 2009, Nyaundi spoke to the BBC News regarding a week-long sex strike to protest political infighting in the Kibaki government that was organised by the Women's Development Organisation coalition which included FIDA.

She has served as the chief executive officer of both the Truth, Justice and Reconciliation Commission of Kenya (TJRC) and the Kenya National Commission on Human Rights (KNCHR). She had previously worked as a Rule of Law Advisor at the National Council on Administration of Justice.

In 2017, Nyaundi and two others edited the law anthology The Right to Say No: Marital Rape and Law Reform in Canada, Ghana, Kenya and Malawi.

=== High Court of Kenya ===
She was appointed Judge of the High Court in 2022, and serves in the Family Division at the Milimani Law Courts in Nairobi, as of 2026. She is also the chair of the Kenyan board of directors for the NGO Physicians for Human Rights.

In 2023, she presided over a landmark ruling on marriage laws that stated couples opting for Christian marriages and other non-civil forms of marriage did not require a "no-objection" certificate confirming they had no previously existing marriage.

==== 2026 Ebola epidemic ====
During the 2026 Ebola epidemic, the United States said that it would not allow Americans to be treated for Ebola in their country. They announced plans to open an Ebola quarantine facility on Laikipia Air Base in Nanyuki, central Kenya that was intended for American Ebola patients. U.S. officials also stated that only Americans would be treated at the unit. The announcement of the proposal led to a swell of public concern, anger, and nationwide criticism in Kenya. As of 2026, Kenya has never registered an Ebola case.

The Kenyan nonprofit Katiba Institute and the Law Society of Kenya submitted a court petition aiming to block the construction of the facility and the admittance of Ebola patients into the country, warning that the proposal presented "grave and imminent risks" to public health. On June 2, Nyaundi ordered the Kenyan government to disclose the “full terms of any agreement, memorandum, arrangement or negotiations relating to the proposed facility,” within the next seven days. The ruling also required that any public health, environment, security, or biosafety assessments that were performed and approvals secured from lawmakers and other regulatory bodies were made public.

The case proceedings are scheduled for June 23, where the date for the full hearing will be set. Despite the court ruling, Kenyan president William Ruto defended and vowed to continue the proposal.

== Personal life ==
In 1987, Nyaundi met her husband Ken Nyaundi when they were both law students at the University of Nairobi. They married in December 1992 in the Maxwell Adventist Church in Milimani, Nairobi and have three children as of 2016.
