= Courts Martial (Kenya) =

Subordinate court in Kenya

Courts Martial (Kenya) is a semiautonomous Subordinate Court in Kenya established under Article 169 1(c) of the 2010 Kenyan Constitution. It is a military court and has jurisdiction over matters involving members of the Kenya Defense Forces.

Judges of these courts are appointed by the Chief Justice of Kenya and exercise their duties and the functions of the Court as per the Kenya Defense Forces Act 2012.

Cases determined under these courts can be appealed at the High Court of Kenya.
