= Bernard Chunga =

11th Chief Justice of the Republic of Kenya

Justice Benard Chunga E.G.H.

12th Chief Justice of Kenya
- In office 1999 – 26 February 2003
- Appointed by: Daniel Arap Moi
- Preceded by: Zacchaeus Chesoni
- Succeeded by: Johnson Gicheru
- Incumbent
- Assumed office 1999

Personal details
- Born: Benard Chunga; 1 January 1949 (age 77)
- Occupation: Chief Justice of Kenya
- Profession: Judge

Bernard Chunga is a Kenyan lawyer and a former Chief Justice of Kenya. Justice Chunga resigned from the office on 26 February 2003 paving the way for the appointment of Justice Johnson Evans Gicheru.

== Early career ==
Justice Chunga previously worked as Deputy Public Prosecutor. As Deputy Public Prosecutor, he was the lead counsel in the commission of Inquiry into Robert Ouko’s death which was led by Justice Evans Gicheru. He was also the prosecutor at the trial of Jonah Anguka, a former DC implicated in Ouko murder.

== Tribunal and Resignation ==
Rather than facing a tribunal established by the newly elected President Mwai Kibaki to investigate alleged misconduct, Justice Chunga resigned.

== See also ==
- Chief Justice of Kenya
- Court of Appeal of Kenya
- High Court of Kenya
