= Laikipia Air Base =

Airport in Laikipia County, Kenya

Laikipia Air Base ~~KAF Nanyuki~~ ~~Nanyuki Air Base~~
- Nanyuki, Laikipia County in Kenya

Site information
- Type: Air Base
- Owner: Kenya Defence Forces
- Operator: Kenya Air Force

Location
- Shown within Kenya
- Coordinates: 00°01′51″N 037°01′31″E

Site history
- Built: April 1973
- In use: 1974-present

Airfield information
- Elevation: 1,865 metres (6,119 ft) AMSL
Runways
| Direction | Length and surface |
|---|---|
| 02/20 | 4,000 metres (13,123 ft) Concrete |

Laikipia Air Base (IATA: n/a, ICAO: n/a) is a Kenya Air Force base located approximately 8 kilometres (5.0 mi) west-northwest of Nanyuki, Kenya.

Laikipia AB was established in 1974 as Nanyuki Air Base and later renamed for the county in which it is located.

== History ==
By the beginning of April 1942, No. 72 Operational Training Unit RAF were setting up at RAF Nanyuki having been moved from Wadi Gazouza in Sudan. The unit was flying Bristol Blenheims, Martin Baltimores, and Douglas Bostons.

RAF Nanyuki was used for anti-Mau Mau operations in 1953-54.

On 25 February 1974, Nanyuki Air Base was opened by the Kenya Air Force (KAF) as its primary airfield for fighter aircraft. In June 1974, the KAF's fleet of BAC Strikemaster aircraft were transferred from RAF Eastleigh (later named KAF Eastleigh) to Nanyuki Air Base. Also in 1974, the KAF purchased six Hawker Hunter combat jets from the Royal Air Force and located them at Nanyuki Air Base (which had since its opening been renamed KAF Nanyuki). In 1978, the Northrop F-5 Freedom Fighter was introduced to the KAF and also based at Nanyuki, and the following year, Nanyuki became the home of the KAF's fleet of Hawker Siddeley Hawk flight training jets.

After the a failed coup by a group of KAF officers on 1 August 1982, the Kenya Air Force was disbanded and placed under the control of the Kenyan Army. During this period, KAF Eastleigh was renamed Moi Air Base and KAF Nanyuki was renamed Laikipia Air Base (LAB).

In August 2014, gunmen drove into one of the airfield's gate and opened fire. One soldier was injured.

=== British presence ===
In 2015, the UK began an infrastructure project to relocate the HQ for its British Army training unit in Kenya, named the British Army Training Unit Kenya (BATUK), to Laikipia Air Base. The HQ is located within an area designated Laikipia Air Base East (LAB(E)). Previously, it was located on land leased from the Nanyuki Agricultural Society, which had to be vacated every year to make way for an agricultural show. LAB(E) now provides permanent facilities on land leased directly from the Kenyan government. BATUK is used to train around 10,000 British troops per year and has 300 permanent personnel.

== US Ebola quarantine facility ==
On 27 May 2026, the White House announced that the United States was constructing a medical facility at Laikipia Air Base to monitor and quarantine asymptomatic Americans exposed to Ebola. US Secretary of State Marco Rubio stated that the facility would be operational within seven days, and that the administration "could not and would not allow" any cases of Ebola to enter the United States. The proposal was criticised by the Kenya Medical Practitioners, Pharmacists and Dentists Union, the Centers for Disease Control and Prevention (CDC), the Law Society of Kenya, and members of the Kenyan public.

On 29 May, the High Court of Kenya temporarily barred the establishment of the facility. On 2 June, the court further prohibited the government from "admitting into Kenya, receiving, transferring, or facilitating the entry of persons exposed to or infected with Ebola", and ordered the government to disclose information relating to the project to the public. Kenyan government officials, including President William Ruto, defended the proposal, stating that it formed part of a long-standing partnership between Kenya and the United States in global health security and pandemic response and would provide financial and technical support to Kenya. Ruto stated that the arrangement was consistent with previous international health collaborations, including the use of facilities in Nairobi during the COVID-19 pandemic.

Protests against the facility erupted in Nanyuki on 1 June, resulting in two deaths and disruptions to transportation and business activity in the surrounding area. Kenyan security forces responded to the protests by cordoning off the base and preventing demonstrators from entering the facility.

A 17-year-old form three student was shot dead during continued protests on 9 June. According to satellite imagery seen by the British Broadcasting Corporation, the facility's construction was ongoing in defiance of the court order.

Cabinet Secretary of Health Aden Duale continued to claim that construction had been halted despite additional Reuters' reports of continued construction after review of satellite imagery and about 20 flights carrying personnel and equipment related to the facility. On 22 June, the High Court found Duale in contempt of court for allowing construction to continue and urged him to comply with future orders from the judiciary. He was summoned to the Milimani High Court to explain why he should not be sentenced for disobeying the court order. During his 23 June appearance on the court, he said that he had misinterpreted the court ruling and that he was committed to following court orders.

On 17 July, Reuters first reported, and the US Department of State later confirmed, that seven Samaritan's Purse personnel had been quarantined at the facility after one of their aid workers got infected with Ebola in the Democratic Republic of Congo.
