= Commission Inquiring into the Insurance Industry =

Kenya Government Commission

The Commission Inquiring into the Insurance Industry, also known as The Hancox Commission, was a Kenya Government Commission established on 17 October 1986. The commission's only member was Justice Allan Robin Winston Hancox who was to be assisted by Mary Ang'awa

== Report ==
The commission's report was released only to selected stakeholders within the insurance industry and, to date has not been formally released to the public.
