= Joseph Sheridan (judge) =

Irish lawyer and judge

Sir Joseph Sheridan

Chief Justice of Kenya
- In office 1934–1946
- Preceded by: Sir Jacob Barth
- Succeeded by: Sir Barclay Nihill

Chief Justice of Tanganyika
- In office 1929–1936
- Preceded by: Sir Alison Russell
- Succeeded by: Sir Sidney Abrahams

Personal details
- Born: 1882 County Mayo, Ireland
- Died: 26 December 1964 (aged 81–82)

Sir Joseph Alfred Sheridan (1882 – 26 December 1964) was an Irish lawyer, judge and administrator who served as a Chief Justice of Kenya and as a Chief Justice of Tanganyika.

== Biography ==
Born in County Mayo, Ireland in 1882. He was educated at Castleknock College and Trinity College, Dublin. He was called to the Bar at King's Inns in Ireland in 1907, and thereafter entered the British Colonial Service in Nyasaland in 1908 as a junior clerk. In 1912, he was appointed assistant to the Attorney-General of Nyasaland and remained in the post until 1913 when he moved to the East Africa Protectorate to become a Resident Magistrate. In 1919, he was made a Judge on the East Africa Court of Appeal. The following year, he was promoted to a Judgeship on the Supreme Court for Eastern Africa. In 1929, he left Kenya to take up the position as Chief Justice of Tanganyika. He was knighted in the 1932 King's Birthday Honours; returning to Kenya in 1934 to succeed Sir Jacob Barth as Chief Justice of Kenya. He retired as Chief Justice in 1946 and died in December 1964.

His son, Sir Dermot (Joseph) Sheridan, later served as Chief Justice of Uganda and as a judge on the High Court of Kenya.
