= Alfred Simpson =

Alfred Simpson may refer to:

- Alfred Simpson (ironmaster) (1805–1891), English iron worker who emigrated to South Australia
- Alfred Allen Simpson (1875–1939), industrialist in South Australia
- Alfred Edward Simpson (1868–1940), architect in South Australia
- Alfred Henry Simpson (1914–2003), British lawyer and Chief Justice of Kenya
- Alfred M. Simpson (1843–1917), South Australian industrialist
- A. W. B. Simpson (Alfred William Brian Simpson, 1931–2011), British legal historian
