= Cecil Miller =

Cecil Miller may refer to:

- Cecil A. Miller (1896–1988), police officer, train worker and political figure on Prince Edward Island.
- Cecil Henry Ethelwood Miller, Chief Justice of Kenya
