= The Miller Inquiry =

Kenyan judicial commission for inquiry of former attorney general Charles Mugane Njonjo

The Miller Inquiry was a Kenya judicial commission appointed to inquire into allegations involving former attorney general of Kenya Charles Mugane Njonjo. The commission was chaired by Cecil Henry Ethelwood Miller.

== Membership ==
The tribunal consisted of:

- Cecil Henry Ethelwood Miller – chairman

The prosecution was led by Lee Muthoga, with the defence led by William Deverell and Paul Muite.

== See also ==
- Attorney General of Kenya
