= Judiciary of Kenya =

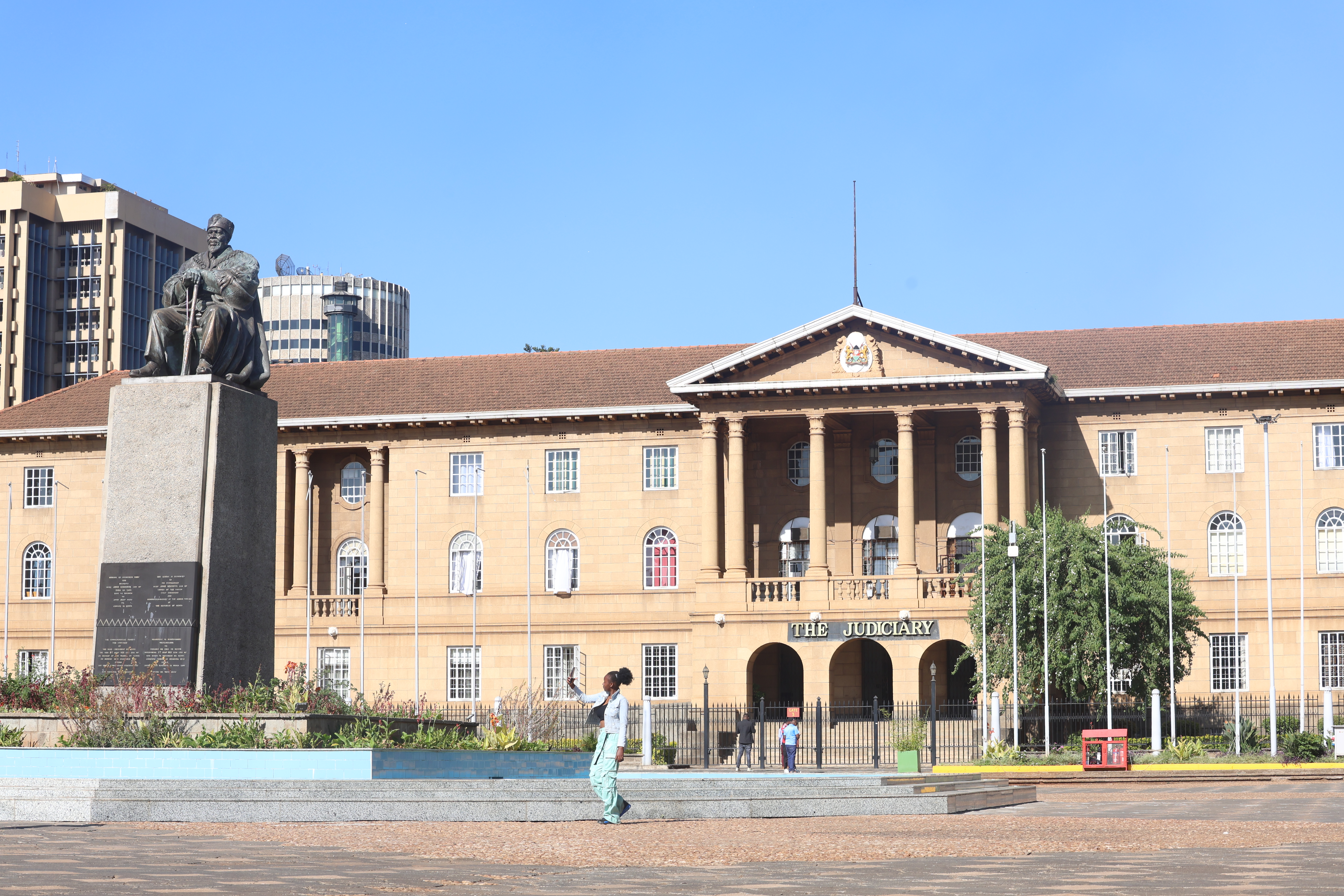
Judiciary building in Nairobi

The Judiciary of Kenya is the system of courts that interprets and applies the law in Kenya. After the promulgation of the Constitution of Kenya in 2010, the general public, through parliament, sought to reform the judiciary. Parliament passed the Magistrates and Judges Vetting Act of 2011. A major part of reforming the judiciary was the vetting of Magistrates and Judges in an attempt to weed out unsuitable ones. The Judicature Act has also been amended to raise the minimum number of Magistrates and Judges allowing more judicial officers to be hired. More magistrates and judges are needed to clear the backlog of cases that have caused great delay in the conclusion of cases and to staff new courts. New courts are needed to bring the courts closer to the people which is in line with devolution, a major principle written into the Constitution of 2010. New courts like the High Court opened in Garissa in November 2014 is a good example. In the past residents of North Eastern Kenya had to go all the way to Embu to access a High Court.

== Courts ==
The Judiciary of Kenya consists of three Superior courts; the Supreme Court, Court of Appeal, High Court. The Employment & Labor Relations Court, the Environment & Land Court are considered to have the same status as the High Court. The subordinate courts consist of the Magistrates Courts, Courts Martial, Small Claims Courts, Kadhi Courts, Tribunals and the Courts Martial.

=== Supreme Court of Kenya ===
The Supreme Court is the highest court in Kenya, and all other courts are bound by its decisions. It is established under Article 163 of the Constitution as the final arbiter and interpreter of the Constitution.

It comprises the Chief Justice of Kenya who is the President of the Court, the Deputy Chief Justice who is the Vice-President of the Court and five other Judges. It sits at the Supreme Court Building (formerly the Court of Appeal in Nairobi Central Business District), and has to have a quorum of five judges.

The Supreme Court of Kenya has designated roles that are defined under section 3 of the Supreme Courts Act of 2011.

=== Court of Appeal ===
This court handles appeal cases from the High Court, the Environment & Land Court and the Employment & Labor Relations Court as prescribed by Parliament. It has between 12 (minimum) and 30 (maximum) judges. The Court of Appeal is headed by a President elected by the Court of Appeal judges among themselves. The current President of the Court of Appeal is Justice Daniel Musinga. Each station of the court is led by a Presiding Judge.

=== High Court ===
The High Court of Kenya is established under Article 165 of the constitution of Kenya. It has supervisory jurisdiction over all other subordinate courts and any other persons, body or authority exercising a judicial or quasi-judicial function. The judges responsible elect one of them to act as the topmost principal judge in the court system. It has unlimited original jurisdiction and carries out supervisory roles.

=== Employment & Labour Relations Court (formerly the Industrial Court) ===
The Employment and Labour relations court is established under Article 162(2)(a) of the Constitution of Kenya 2010. It is also established under The Employment & Labour Relations Act of 2011 to hear and determine disputes relating to employment and labour relations and for connected purposes.

The Employment and Labour Court has both appellate and original jurisdiction to hear disputes between different parties regarding labour.

=== Environment and Land Court ===
An Act of Parliament to give effect to Article 162(2)(b) of the Constitution; to establish a superior court to hear and determine disputes relating to the environment and the use and occupation of, and title to, land, and to make provision for its jurisdiction functions and powers, and for connected purposes

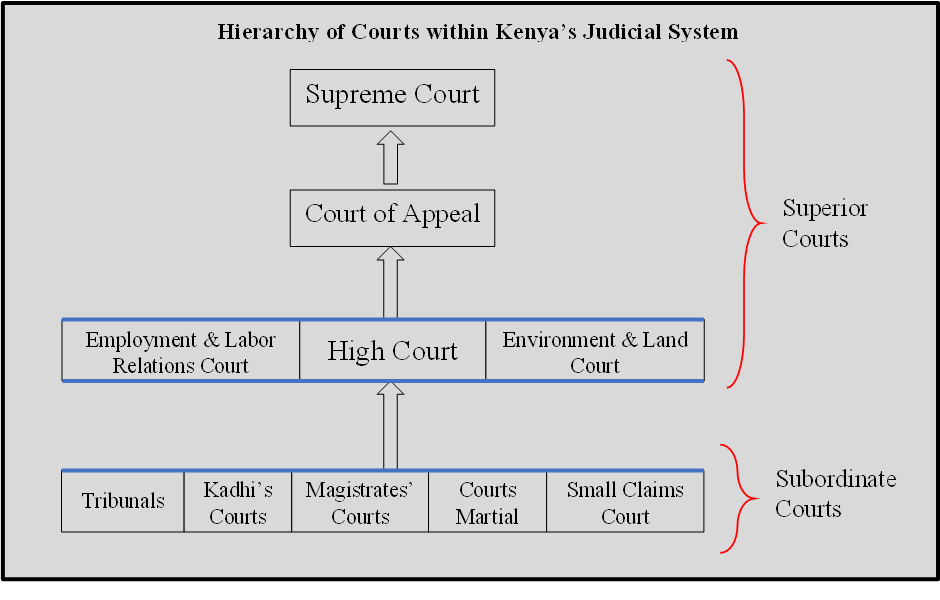

=== Subordinate Courts ===
The courts below the High Court are referred to as Subordinate courts. These are:

==== Magistrates Court ====
Article 169 1(a) of the constitution of Kenya 2010 creates the Magistrate court. This is where majority of the judiciaries cases are heard. Magistrate courts are generally located in every county in Kenya. The new Magistrate Courts' Act 2015 significantly increases the pecuniary jurisdiction of magistrate courts. One of the most notable changes in terms of the expansion of the jurisdiction of the Magistrates Courts is with regard to the increase of the pecuniary jurisdiction in relation to proceedings of a civil nature. For instance, the pecuniary jurisdiction where the Court is presided over by a chief magistrate has been increased from KSh.7 million/= to KSh.20 million/=. The Chief Justice is however empowered to revise the pecuniary limits of the civil jurisdiction by a Gazette notice, by taking into account inflation and prevailing economic conditions. The presiding judicial officer in Magistrate court could be a Chief Magistrate, Senior Principal Magistrate, Senior Resident Magistrate, Resident Magistrate or Principle Magistrate. Their authorities vary in administrative responsibility and range of fining and sentencing abilities. The Judicature Act is the statute passed by parliament detailing the varying powers and jurisdiction of Magistrates and Judges.

==== Kadhi's Court ====
Article 169 1(b) of the Constitution of Kenya 2010 creates Kadhi's court. This is a court that hears civil matters relating to Sharia law. The parties involved must all be followers of Islam and all must agree that the matter to be decided under Islamic law. The matter must be civil in nature e.g. Divorce, succession etc. The court is headed by a Chief Kadhi and parliament is given the authority to enact laws describing the guidelines, qualification and jurisdiction of this court. Appeals from Kadhi Court are heard by the High Court.

==== Courts Martial ====
Article 169 1(c) of the constitution of Kenya 2010 creates the Martial courts. Generally, this type of jurisdiction involves a group of law administrators, that is, the military court where matters involving members of the Kenya Defense Forces are heard. Appeals from this court are heard by the High Court.

==== Tribunals ====
Tribunals form part of Kenya's subordinate courts under Article 169(1)(d) of the constitution of Kenya 2010. They are established under various Acts of Parliament to determine disputes arising from the decision of government entities.

== Administration within the Judiciary ==
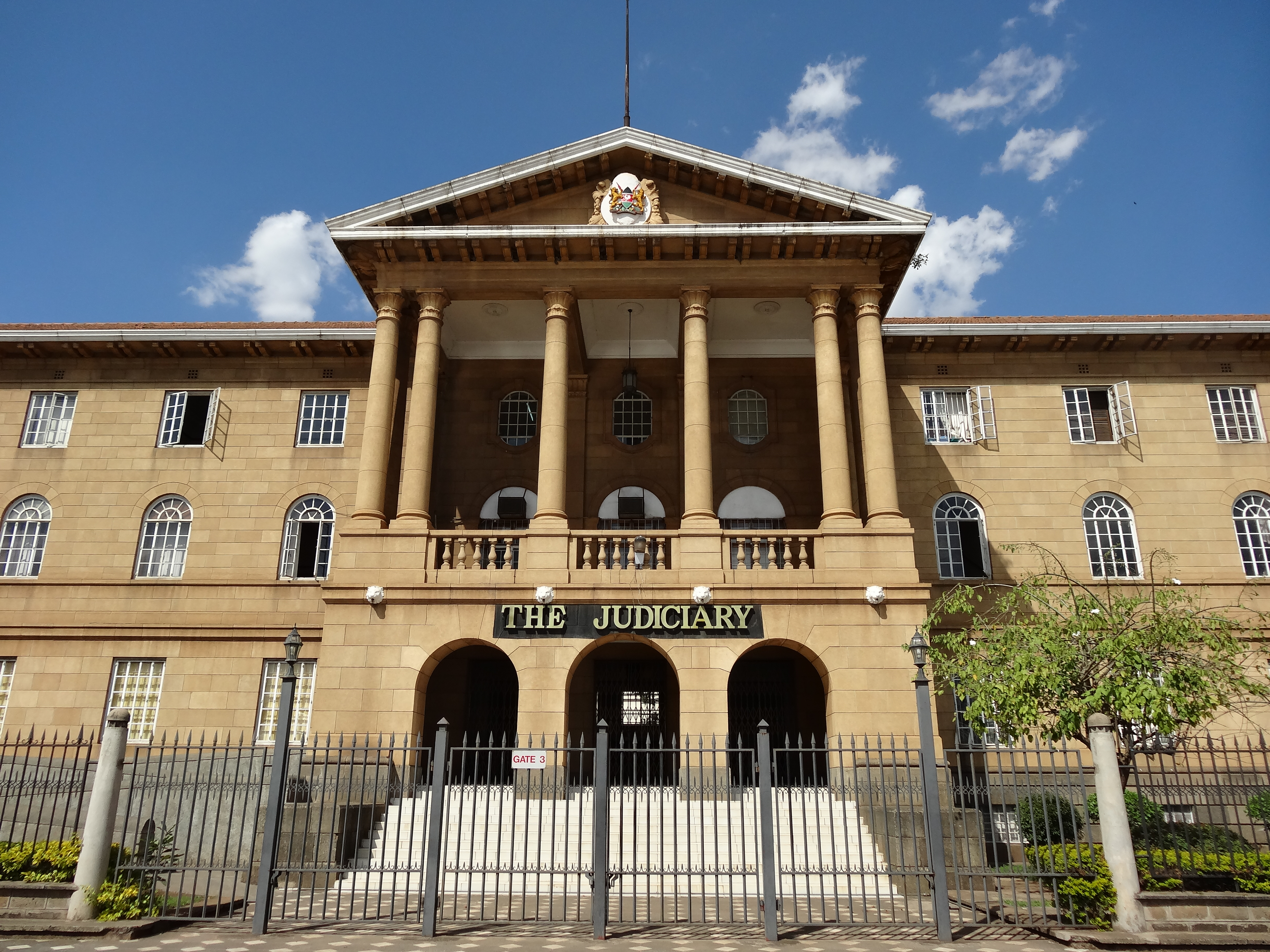
The Judiciary

The chief administrator of the Supreme Court is the Chief Justice, who is the President of the Supreme Court. One of his/her responsibilities is to come up with procedures for running the courts, as well as decisions on staffing and where new courts should be opened. Certain situations dictate that the Chief Justice appoint a judge or panel of judges to deal with a specific matter. The Deputy Chief Justice is the deputy president of the Supreme Court.

The judges of the High Court and the Court of Appeal each elect a member to deal with administrative issues as well as represent them in the Judicial Service Commission.

The Chief Registrar of the Judiciary has the responsibility of being the chief administrator and accounting officer of the Judiciary. There is a Registrar each for the Supreme Court, the Court of Appeal, the High Court, the Environment & Land Court and the Employment & Labor Relations Courts. There is also a Registrar for Magistrates Courts, Tribunals and the Small Claims Court. The Registrar for each court serves as the administrator, record keeper and accounting officer in each of the courts.

== Judicial Service Commission ==
An independent Judicial Service Commission has been set up to handle the appointment of judges. They will recommend a list of persons to be appointed as judges by the President.

== Chief Justice ==
The Chief Justice of Kenya is the head of the Judiciary, the President of the Supreme Court and the Chairperson of the Judicial Service Commission. The Chief Justice is deputised in his/her functions by the Deputy Chief Justice who is also the Vice President of the Supreme Court. The Chief Justice and the Deputy Chief Justice are appointed by the country's President on the recommendation of the Judicial Service Commission and subject to the approval of the National Assembly.

The current Chief Justice is Martha Koome, who was appointed to the office by President Uhuru Kenyatta after the previous Chief Justice, David Kenani Maraga, retired on 12 January 2021.

The Deputy Chief Justice is Philomena Mbete Mwilu.

== Chief Registrar ==
The Chief Registrar of the Judiciary is the chief administrator and accounting officer of the Judiciary. The Chief Registrar also serves as the Secretary of the Judicial Service Commission and the Secretary to the National Council on the Administration of Justice. The Chief Registrar is appointed by the Judicial Service Commission.

The current Chief Registrar is Anne Atieno Amadi, who was appointed to the office in January 2014, succeeding Hon Gladys Boss Shollei.

== See also ==
- Judicial Service Commission (Kenya)
- Kenya Judges and Magistrates Vetting Board
