= Joyce Rugg Gunn =

British lawyer and court official (1914 – after 1976)

- Born: Gertrude Joyce Rugg Gunn; 31 October 1914; Tottenham, London, England, U.K.
- Occupations: Lawyer, colonial official in Kenya

Gertrude Joyce Rugg Gunn (31 October 1914 – after 1976), sometimes written as G. J. Rugg-Gunn, was a British lawyer and court official in Kenya. She was "the first woman to enter the legal service in the British Colonial Office" in 1946, and served as acting chief registrar of the Supreme Court of Kenya in summer 1950.

== Early life and education ==
Rugg Gunn was born in Tottenham, the daughter of Andrew Rugg Gunn and Gertrude Martha Smith. Her father was a physician, an eye specialist, born in Scotland. Her older brother Mark Andrew Rugg Gunn was a Navy surgeon. She attended Sherborne School for Girls, Girton College, Cambridge, and Bonn University in Germany.

== Career ==
Rugg Gunn worked in the legal department of a bank and with Sybil Campbell at the Ministry of Food as a young woman. She was "the first woman to enter the legal service in the British Colonial Office" when she became deputy registrar of the Supreme Court of Kenya at Mombasa in 1946. She was appointed acting resident magistrate at Mombasa in 1947. She was acting chief registrar of the Supreme Court of Kenya and the Court of Appeal for Eastern Africa in summer 1950.

After Kenyan independence, Rugg Gunn was solicitor for the London County Council (LCC), and later for its successor, the Greater London Council, into the late 1970s.
