= George Francis Macdaniel Ennis =

British barrister and colonial judge (1868–1933)

Chief Justice of Uganda Protectorate
- In office 1911–1912
- Preceded by: Office created
- Succeeded by: Morris Carter

Personal details
- Born: 14 November 1868 London
- Died: 22 December 1933 (aged 65) Uitenhage, South Africa
- Children: 1 son
- Occupation: Barrister, colonial administrator and senior judge

George Francis Macdaniel Ennis (14 November 1868 – 22 December 1933) was a British barrister and senior colonial judge who served in East Africa and Ceylon in the early twentieth century.

== Early life and education ==
Ennis was born in London in 1868. He was educated privately and at King's College School, London. In 1892, he was called to the bar of the Middle Temple.

== Career ==
Ennis entered the Colonial Service in 1894 as Secretary to the Governor of British North Borneo, and served under the North Borneo Chartered Company in various capacities until 1897. In 1899, he went to the East Africa Protectorate where he served as Registrar (1899); Judge (1900); and Assistant Judge, Zanzibar (1899 and 1901). In 1902, he was transferred to the Protectorate of Uganda where he was appointed Chief Judicial Officer and Vice-consul and later served as a Principal Judge and Chief Justice of the High Court of Uganda, while also serving as Judge of the Court of Appeal for East Africa. In 1911, he published: The Laws of Uganda. In 1912, he went to Ceylon where he served as Senior Puisne Judge of the Supreme Court of Ceylon and on occasion as Acting Chief Justice until 1925, when he retired from the judicial service.

== Personal life and death ==
Ellis married Ethel Kirkland in 1904 and they had a son. He died in Uitenhage, South Africa on 22 December 1933.
