= William Alison Russell =

Scottish lawyer (1875–1948)

Sir William Alison Russell
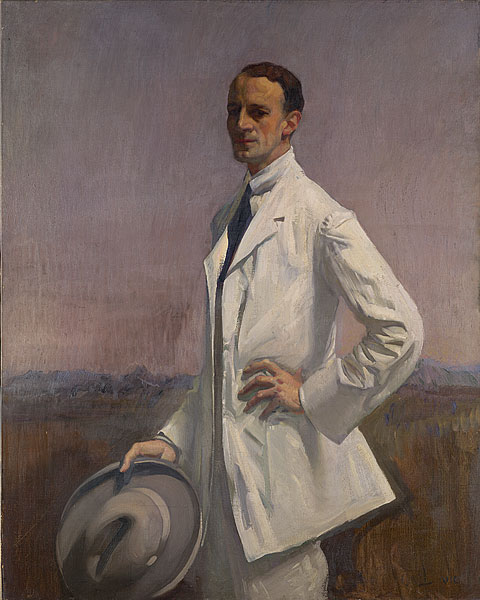
- William Alison Russell in 1910 by George Washington Lambert (Note: In 1910 Russell and George Washington Lambert took a short boating holiday in the Isle of Skye. Lambert probably painted this portrait after returning.)

King's Advocate (Cyprus)
- In office 1912–1924
- Preceded by: John Alexander Strachey Bucknill
- Succeeded by: John Curtois Howard

Chief Justice of Tanganyika
- In office 1924–1929
- Preceded by: William Morris Carter
- Succeeded by: Joseph Alfred Sheridan

Personal details
- Born: 1875 Scotland
- Died: 1948 (aged 72–73)
- Occupation: Lawyer

Sir William Alison Russell, KCMG (1875–1948), known as Sir Alison Russell was a Scottish lawyer who served in the British Colonial Legal Service as an attorney and judge.

== Personal life ==
William Alison Russell was born in 1875, the son of George Russell, an engineer. His cousin was the Australian artist John Russell. Another relative and close friend was the Australian painter Thea Proctor. He attended Rugby School. In his private life Russell was active in sailing and skating. He was interested in contemporary literature, painted watercolors and was an excellent musician. He became a barrister-at-law.

== Career ==
Alison Russell served in various legal positions in the British Colonial offices in Africa, the Mediterranean and the West Indies.

=== Uganda ===
On 21 March 1907 Henry Hesketh Bell, His Majesty's Commissioner in Uganda, conferred on William Alison Russell of Entebbe the power of administering oaths in all cases in which he was concerned as Administrator-General, Curator in Lunacy or Receiver in Bankruptcy. In 1910 Russell was Attorney-General in Uganda. In November 1910 he was Acting Chief Secretary to the Uganda government and prepared a report of the Uganda Blue Book for the 1909–10 financial year.

=== Cyprus ===
Alison Russell was King's Advocate in Cyprus from 1912 to 1924. This office had formerly been called "Legal Advisor of the Government", but the responsibilities were steady increased, and in 1925 the title was changed to "Attorney General". In this role, to which he was appointed on 12 August 1912, he was a member of the Executive Council headed by Sir Hamilton Goold-Adams, and an ex-officio member of the Legislative Council.

=== Tanganyika ===
Alison Russell was Chief Justice of Tanganyika from 1924 to 1929. In a personal letter to Sir Harry Luke of 24 February 1926 he wrote "... I am going down the Congo, I hope + out at Matadi. Leaving Kigoma at the beginning of May – it takes about six weeks from Kigoma to Antwerp….I have never been to Haarlem..." He was knighted on 6 March 1928.

The first governor of Tanganyika under the British mandate was Sir Horace Byatt, who started to give the chiefs greater involvement in the administration. The new policy was fully endorsed by his successor Donald Cameron, who decided to remove the power of the High Court to review native court decisions. Sir Alison Russell cooperated with implementation of indirect rule, but considered that the High Court's right to revise native court decisions was essential. He clashed with Cameron over this issue, and eventually resigned over it.

=== Malta and Northern Rhodesia ===
Alison Russell was Legal Adviser to the Governor of Malta before being assigned to a commission of inquiry in Northern Rhodesia (today's Zambia). In Malta he was charged with examining into the work of the Courts. This resulted in an ordinance that reformed the court procedures to reduce delays in disposal of cases, and legislation that made the native language of the island, Maltese, the language of the courts wherever possible.

In late May 1935 there was a gathering of striking Bemba miners outside the offices of the Roan Antelope copper mine in Luanshya District, Northern Rhodesia. The police fired at random into the miners and their supporters. Six people were killed and 22 wounded. The governor, Hubert Winthrop Young formed a commission led by Alison Russell to report on the reason for the disturbances. The conclusion was that it was due to a tax increase that had been announced to the miners abruptly and without explanation. The commission did not question the tax increase itself, but reformers asked what the Africans received in return for the tax.

=== Later career ===
In March 1938 Alison Russell was named a member of the Palestine Commission, chaired by Sir John Woodhead. It was to visit Palestine and study the question of partition. Later Alison Russell was Assistant Legal Adviser at the Colonial Office. He was head of a commission that reported on disturbances in the Bahamas in the summer of 1942. The Alison Russell Commission found that the 1 June 1942 riot in Nassau by 2,000 Black laborers was not related to race, but was about economic issues. It recommended that in place of tariffs on food and supplies from the United States, the government should introduce an income tax which would raise government revenues from the wealthier inhabitants. It also recommended introduction of a secret ballot, improved access to birth control and economic stimulus measures.

In the 1943 King's Birthday Honours List Alison Russell was appointed K.C.M.G., for services to the Colonial Office. He died in 1948.

== Publications ==
- William Alison Russell (1946), The Magistrate
- William Alison Russell (1 January 1936), Notes and forms on official proceedings under the Colonial Regulations against an officer for offences, Malta

== Sources ==
- Bell, Henry Hesketh (21 March 1907), "Notice", Kenya Gazette
- "Colonial Administration (West Indies)", Hansard, vol. 388, 15 April 1943
- ""Income tax and Birth Control" so recommends a royal commission report 1942", Bahamianology, 3 December 2017
- Johnson, Herschel V. (1 March 1938), The Chargé in the United Kingdom (Johnson) to the Secretary of State, London
- Kyprianou, Despina (December 2006), The Role of the Cyprus Attorney General's Office in Prosecutions: Rhetoric, Ideology and Practice (PDF) (Thesis), London School of Economics and Political Science, University of London
- MacDonald, Malcolm (25 June 1935), "Disturbances, Northern Rhodesia (Commission Of Inquiry).", Hansard
- "Malta", Hansard, vol. 98, 30 July 1935
- Messac, Luke Michael (2016), Dividends Of Disquiet: Popular Politics And Economic Thought In The History Of Government Medical Services In Nyasaland/malawi, 1914-1983 (Publicly Accessible Penn Dissertations. 2471), archived from the original on 8 June 2020
- "Meteorological Observations", The Meteor, Rugby: Rugby School, 21 June 1943
- "Russell, Sir Alison (Chief Justice of Tanganyika)", Innanna Rare Books
- Swanepoel, Paul (2017), "Colonial judges, administrative officers and the Bushe commission in interwar Kenya and Tanganyika", Fundamina, 23 (1), Pretoria: 89–110, doi:10.17159/2411-7870/2017/v23n1a5, ISSN 2411-7870
- Tomkins, Stanley C., Acting Governor (February 1911), Uganda. Report for 1909-19 (PDF), His Majesty's Stationery Office
- The Cyprus Blue Book 1912-1913 (PDF), Great Britain, Colonial Office : Nicosia Government Printing Office, 1913
- "Whitehall, March 6, 1928" (PDF), The London Gazette, p. 1676, 9 March 1928
- William Alison Russell Esq., National Gallery of Australia
