= Anne A. Amadi =

Current Chief Registrar of the Kenya Judiciary

Honorable Anne A. Amadi CBS

Chief Registrar of the Kenya Judiciary
- In office 13 January 2014 – 12 January 2024
- Deputy: Hon Paul N. Maina
- Preceded by: Gladys Boss Shollei

Personal details
- Born: Anne Atieno; 29 September 1966 (age 60) Siaya District, Kenya
- Spouse: Engineer Dan Amadi
- Children: 4
- Education: University of Nairobi (LLB); Kenya School of Law; California State University, Sacramento; International Institute of Humanitarian Law; Boston University (LLM)

Anne Atieno Amadi is a Kenyan lawyer who served as the chief registrar of the Kenya Judiciary from 13 January 2014 to 12 January 2024.

== Education ==
Amadi attended Tans Nzoia Primary School and Kapsabet Girls for her A Levels. She holds a Bachelor of Laws degree from the University of Nairobi and a Master of Criminal Justice from Boston University. She also holds a Post Graduate Diploma in the Law of Internal Displacement from the International Institute of Humanitarian Law, San Remo, Italy; a Post Graduate Diploma in Alternative Dispute Resolution from California State University, Sacramento, and a Post Graduate Diploma in Legal Practice, Kenya School of Law.

== Early career ==
Anne Amadi was admitted to the bar in Kenya in 1987. After a short stint as State Counsel in the Civil Litigation Department in the Office of the Attorney General, she joined the Judiciary as a District Magistrate in 1991, leaving in 1997 at the rank of Resident Magistrate. She left the Judiciary to practice law privately with her firm, A. A. Amadi & Co. Advocates between 1997 and 2003.

== Chief Registrar of the Kenya Judiciary ==
Amadi returned to the Judiciary in January 2014, having been appointed as the Chief Registrar on a five-year contract. She succeeded Gladys Boss Shollei, who left office in October 2013.
