= Federation of Women Lawyers–Kenya =

Human rights organisation based in Kenya

The Federation of Women Lawyers–Kenya (FIDA Kenya) is a gender rights non-profit established in 1985 after the 3rd UN Conference on Women, which was held in Nairobi, with a mission to promote women’s individual and collective power to claim their rights in all spheres of life.

FIDA-Kenya comprises over 1,400 women advocates, lawyers, and law students who have, for 40 years of the NGO’s existence, offered free legal aid to women in Kenya and their children and strived to ensure that laws in Kenya take women’s needs into account. The organisation has received recognition as a critical partner in community, government, and UN projects, especially for their model of training women to self-represent in court.

FIDA-Kenya handles litigation on custody and maintenance matters, land and matrimonial property disputes, labor and economic rights. The non-profit also engages in advocacy around women in political participation, Sexual Reproductive Health Rights, Female Genital Mutilation (FGM), Child and Forced Marriage, and Sexual Offences.

== History ==
Lawyers Lilian Waiiya Mwaura, and Martha Koome founded FIDA-Kenya with a simple goal to empower women to understand their legal rights. Monica Mbaru, Winnie Kamande, Violet Mavisi, Judy Thongori, Jane Anyango, Joyce Majiwa, Amb Jean Kamau, Njoki Ndung’u, Rosemary Mwenja, Abida Aroni, Ann Mwululu, Alice Wahome, Martha Koome, Nancy Baraza, and Prof Betty Murungi were members of the FIDA-Kenya council in 1998.

Patricia Nyaundi was the executive director of the Federation when in 2009, she spoke to the BBC News regarding her support for a week-long sex strike to protest political infighting in the Kibaki government that was organised by the Women's Development Organisation coalition which included FIDA-Kenya.

FIDA-Kenya has historically been at the forefront of fighting domestic abuse in Kenya and providing legal representation to women in such cases. To get free legal aid from FIDA-Kenya, beneficiaries can either present themselves physically in a FIDA-Kenya office, request assistance by phone, or contact the organisation through their social media channels.
