= Morris Carter =

British colonial administrator

Sir Morris Carter

Chief Justice of Uganda
- In office 1912–1920
- Preceded by: George Francis Macdaniel Ennis
- Succeeded by: Charles James Griffin

Chief Justice of Tanganyika
- In office 1920–1924
- Preceded by: (none)
- Succeeded by: William Alison Russell

Personal details
- Born: 1873 Canterbury, Kent, England
- Died: 1960 (aged 86–87)
- Occupation: Lawyer, colonial administrator

Sir William Morris Carter, CBE (Note: A few sources give the surname as "Morris-Carter". Most sources use "Carter", or sometimes "Morris Carter". The given names may come from William Morris (1834–1896), a British textile designer.) (1873–1960) was a British lawyer and colonial administrator. He served as registrar and judge in Kenya, Uganda and Tanganyika between 1902 and 1924. He tried without success to alienate lands held by Africans in Uganda so they could be organized as European plantations using native laborers. He chaired the 1925 Southern Rhodesia land commission and the 1932–1933 Kenya Land Commission, both of which alienated Africans from their land and allocated large areas for exclusively European settlement. He served on the Royal Commission on Palestine (1936–1937).

== Life ==
=== Early years (1873–1902) ===
William Morris Carter was born in Canterbury, England in 1873. He was educated at the King's School, Canterbury and the University of Oxford, and then joined the British colonial administration.

=== East Africa (1902–1924) ===
In 1902 Carter was appointed registrar of the Protectorate of Kenya.

In 1906 Judge William Morris Carter issued a report on Buganda land tenure, and in September 1907 issued another report dealing with some areas outside Buganda. In March 1907 a land tenure committee, of which Carter was a member, presented its recommendations to the government. However, the idea of land alienation in favor of European planters was not viewed favorably by the Ugandan governor Henry Hesketh Bell at this time.

In 1912 Carter was appointed Chief Justice of the High Court of Uganda. That year he was appointed to investigate immigrant plantations in Uganda. He wrote "that the government ought to facilitate as much as it could the development of European-owned plantations". Carter represented the majority view of Europeans when his Land Commission of 1914 favored the plantation system as most likely to result in economic growth. He was opposed by the director of agriculture, S. Simpson, and the provincial commissioner of Eastern Province, Francis Spire, who both thought that the African farms should be the basis of the Ugandan economy. The Governor of Uganda, Sir Frederick John Jackson, approved of Carter's views, which were expressed in the Carter Report sent to the Colonial Office in 1915. However, the Colonial Office favored peasant farming over European plantations, so Carter's recommendations were rejected by the British government. An important consideration for Bonar Law, the colonial secretary, may have been that disrupting the colony's internal affairs would be unwise at a time when World War I was being fought in East Africa as well as Europe.

Carter ruled against the Maasai land claims in 1913. In 1917–1918 Carter was in charge of the Local Shortages Section of the Ministry of Food in London. After the war, Carter and like-minded Europeans in Entebbe continued to promote the interests of European planters over Africans in a series of reports. Carter's Seventh Report was approved by Sir Robert Coryndon, who had succeeded Jackson as Governor of Uganda, and was sent to London in 1920. Carter's conclusions were formulated in the Land Registration and Transfer Act of 1920, submitted to the Secretary of State for the Colonies Lord Milner for approval. The ordinance went further than Carter's original proposal. It reduced the land granted to each African family from 6–8 acres (2.4–3.2 ha) down to 4 acres (1.6 ha), and most families were to be tenants of the crown rather than freeholders. However, the ordinance had little real effect since the planters were suffering from a severe trade depression, a lack of money and an acute shortage of labor.

Both Lord Milner and his successor Winston Churchill were thought to be on the side of the European planters. However, Victor Cavendish, 9th Duke of Devonshire became Colonial Secretary at the end of 1922, and in February 1923 reversed the land policies that Coryndon had approved based on Carter's recommendations. This conclusively established that Uganda was to be treated as "primarily as an African territory dependent for its development upon African peasant farming." The deciding factor was that the Europeans had completely failed as planters in Uganda, while the African peasant farmers had thrived.

By 1920 Carter had served as Chief Justice of the Uganda Protectorate, Acting Governor of Uganda and President of the Court of Appeal for East Africa. On 16 August 1920 Sir William Morris Carter, C.B.E., lately Chief Justice of the High Court of Uganda, was appointed Chief Justice of the High Court of Tanganyika. The newly created high court opened on 3 January 1921 in an existing building near the harbor of Dar es Salaam that had been adapted for use as a court by the Public Works Department. Carter was assisted by Judge Gilchrist Alexander. Under Sir Horace Byatt, first governor of Tanganyika, Carter often interfered in native policy. He left Tanganyika in 1924.

=== Southern Rhodesia (1925–1926) ===
Article 83 of the Southern Rhodesia Order-in-Council of 1898 stated that: "A native may acquire, hold, encumber and dispose of land on the same conditions as a person who is not a native." However, a resolution of the Southern Rhodesia Legislative Council on 18 May 1921 read: "In the interest of all alike, it is not desirable that natives should acquire land indiscriminately owing to the inevitable friction which will arise with their European neighbours." To resolve this, on 10 January 1925 the Governor of Southern Rhodesia appointed a Land Commission under Judge William Morris Carter to decide how to deal with Africans living on unalienated crown lands and on farms, mines and towns owned by white settlers. The commission was to inquire into and report on defining areas where only natives could own land, and areas where only European could own land.

A 1935 article in the Journal of the Royal African Society described Carter's 1926 report as "a most able and comprehensive report". The commission found that the Africans did not have any inalienable land rights, and agreed with the Rhodesian government that separating the races in land settlement was "not only inescapable but also inherently desirable." The main recommendations were eventually included in the Land Apportionment Act of 1930. This removed the constitutional reservation on the rights of Africans to hold land, stated that there would be separate areas where Europeans and Natives would be able to hold land, and defined in detail the "Native Purchase Area".

=== Kenya Land Commission (1932–1933) ===
Philip Cunliffe-Lister, Secretary of State for Colonies, set up the three-man Kenya Land Commission chaired by Sir William Morris Carter, with Captain Frank O'Brien Wilson and Mr. Rupert William Hemsted. They were to investigate African land claims in Kenya and the problems caused by lack of clear land titles for Africans. There was no African representation on the commission, and two of the members owned land that would be affected by the commission's findings. The commission began hearings in London in June 1932, then moved to Nairobi on 2 August 1932. Over the course of the next year they heard hundred of witnesses, many concerning alienation of Kikuyu land in Kiambu County.

The report of the Kenya Land Commission was delivered to the Secretary of State for the Colonies in September 1932, and submitted to parliament seven months later. Despite strong evidence of a long established system of Kikuyu land ownership, which the British had ignored when alienating the land for use by settlers, the commission dismissed the Kikuyu claims. The Commission defined native reserves for Africans. It decided that the Africans had sufficient land in these reserves, but that they should farm more efficiently and consolidate fragmented land holdings. It also agreed that roughly 100 square miles of Kikuyu land near Nairobi had been taken in error. In compensation, it arranged for a slightly larger area near the forest to be returned to the tribe. The White Highlands would be reserved for the exclusive use of White settlers, with a Highlands Board to look after their interests. This policy eventually led to the Mau Mau Uprising in the 1950s.

=== Later career ===
On 7 August 1936 Carter was appointed to the Palestine Royal Commission chaired by William Robert Wellesley, Earl Peel. Its purpose was to investigate the disturbances in the Mandate for Palestine that had broken out in mid-April, to determine if either the Arabs or the Jews had any legitimate grievances, and to make recommendations for addressing any legitimate grievances. The report was issued in July 1937. It concluded that the most practical solution was partition, with a mandate for protection of the Holy Places that would ensure they would never come under Jewish control. The Arabs would lose territory, but would obtain their national independence, and would not be swamped by the Jews or eventually subjected to Jewish rule. The Jews would not gain all the land they claimed, but would be secure from Arab rule within the Jewish National Home. The National Home would be a Jewish State, a Jewish nation planted in Palestine. Both sides would gain peace.

William Morris Carter died in 1960.

== Publications ==
- Carter, William Morris, Sir (1934), Report of the Kenya land commission, London: H.M. Stationery office

== Sources ==
- Coray, Michael S. (January 1978), "The Kenya Land Commission and the Kikuyu of Kiambu", Agricultural History, 52 (1), Agricultural History Society: 179–193, JSTOR 3742957
- "Delhi", Pioneer Mail and Indian Weekly News, vol. 47, 17 September 1920
- "Downing Street" (PDF), The London Gazette, p. 8479, 17 August 1920
- Edward VIII (20 September 1936), "Palestine Royal Commission" (PDF), Palestine Gazette (631), Authority
- Home, Robert (2012), "Colonial Township Laws and Urban Governance in Kenya", Journal of African Law, 56 (2), School of Oriental and African Studies: 175–193, doi:10.1017/S0021855312000083, JSTOR 41709959, S2CID 143502908
- Howe, Charles Henry Walter (1961), Colonial policy as a major variable force shaping political change in Africa: a case study of Uganda, 1905-1945 (PDF) (Thesis), Boston University
- Jennings, A. C.; Huggins, G. M. (July 1935), "Land Apportionment in Southern Rhodesia", Journal of the Royal African Society, 34 (136), Oxford University Press on behalf of The Royal African Society: 296–312, JSTOR 716823
- Kiereini, Douglas (2 May 2019), "How 1934 Morris-Carter land report set stage for Mau Mau", Business Daily
- Muchemwa, Felix (16 February 2017), "The Struggle For Land in Zimbabwe (1890 – 2010)…….when right of conquest to land was converted to a human right", The Patriot
- Mutibwa, Phares M. (1976), "White Settlers in Uganda: The Era of Hopes and Disillusionment, 1905-1923", Transafrican Journal of History, 5 (2), Gideon Were Publications: 112–122, JSTOR 24520238
- Secretary of State for the Colonies (July 1937), Palestine Royal Commission Report (PDF), His Majesty's Stationery Office
- Swanepoel, Paul (2013), "Transient Justice: Colonial Judges on Circuit in Interwar Tanganyika" (PDF), Stichproben. Wiener Zeitschrift für kritische Afrikastudien, 13 (24)
- Swanepoel, Paul (2017), "Colonial Judges, Administrative Officers and the Bushe Commission in interwar Kenya and Tanganyika", Fundamina, 23 (1): 89–110, doi:10.17159/2411-7870/2017/v23n1a5, ISSN 2411-7870
- Taylor, Thomas F. (1978), "The Struggle for Economic Control of Uganda, 1919-1922: Formulation of an Economic Policy", The International Journal of African Historical Studies, 11 (1), Boston University African Studies Center: 1–31, doi:10.2307/217052, JSTOR 217052
