= Davji Bhimji Atellah =

Kenyan trade unionist

- Citizenship: Kenya
- Education: Moi University; University of Nairobi
- Occupations: Trade Unionist pharmacist
- Years active: 2016 to Present
- Title: Secretary general and Chief Executive Officer of the KMPDU.

Dr Davji Bhimji Attellah is a clinical pharmacist and the current secretary general of the Kenya Medical Practitioners, Pharmacists and Dentists Union. He was elected in 2021, ousting Dr Chibanzi Mwachonda in union elections that also saw Dr Abidan Muchuma elected National Chairman and Dr David Mundia elected Vice Chairperson. He was re-elected unopposed to his position, as the union's entire leadership team was returned to office, in 2026. His tenure as Secretary General has been marked by an aggressive approach to labour negotiations, with National and County Government, featuring several regional industrial actions and a national doctors' strike in 2024.
