= Alfred Henry Simpson =

4th Chief Justice of the Republic of Kenya

Sir Alfred Henry Simpson (29 October 1914 – 22 September 2003) was a British lawyer and a former Chief Justice of Kenya.

== Biography ==
Simpson was born in Dundee, Scotland and educated at the University of St Andrews and University of Edinburgh. He was admitted as a solicitor in Scotland in 1938.

During the Second World War he served with the Royal Army Service Corps and achieved the rank of Major. At the end of the war he served as Legal Secretary for the British Military Administration in Cyrenaica, and later Crown Counsel to Singapore between 1949 and 1956. He thereafter moved to the Gold Coast where he served as a High Court Judge between 1956 and 1961 and Malaysia between 1961 and 1967 from where he moved to Kenya in 1967. In 1982, President Daniel Arap Moi appointed him Chief Justice of Kenya as successor to Sir James Wicks, a post he held until his retirement in 1985.

He was knighted in the Queen's 1985 Birthday Honours. He died in Canberra, Australia in 2003.

== See also ==
- Chief Justice of Kenya
