= John Harry Barclay Nihill =

Sir John Harry Barclay Nihill KBE, KC, MC

Chief Justice of Kenya
- In office 1946–1951
- Preceded by: Sir Joseph Sheridan
- Succeeded by: Sir Ronald Sinclair

Personal details
- Born: July 27, 1892 Hastings, Sussex, England
- Died: December 1975 Westminster, London, England
- Education: Felsted School
- Alma mater: Emmanuel College, Cambridge
- Occupation: Lawyer, colonial administrator
- Profession: Barrister
- Known for: Colonial legal service across Hong Kong, Iraq, Uganda, British Guiana, Ceylon, Kenya
- Awards: Military Cross

Military service
- Branch/service: British Army
- Years of service: 1914–1918
- Battles/wars: World War I

Sir John Harry Barclay Nihill, KBE, KC, MC (27 July 1892 – December 1975) was a British lawyer and administrator who served throughout the British Empire.

== Biography ==
He was born in Hastings, Sussex in 1892. He was educated at Felsted School and read history at Emmanuel College, Cambridge, where he was president of Cambridge Union. He thereafter studied law and was called to the Bar at Inner Temple in 1914. He immediately thereafter enlisted in the military, and served in the British Army during the First World War. His civilian career began in 1919 as an Investigating Officer in the Industrial Council's Division of the Ministry of Labour.

Between 1920 and 1921 he was Private Secretary to Sir William Edge, but left to enter the Colonial Service and serve as a Cadet in Hong Kong. He was appointed to the post of Police Magistrate in Kowloon in 1926, and also acted as Assistant to the Attorney General and Puisne Judge of the Supreme Court there. Between 1927 and 1932 he served in Iraq as the Legal Secretary of the High Commissioner and in 1928 and 1931, in addition, he also functioned as Acting British Consul in Baghdad.

In 1934, he moved to Uganda where he served as Solicitor-General and Acting Attorney-General and Acting Chief Justice. In 1936, he moved to British Guiana where he served as Attorney General until 1938. He was promoted to the post of Puisne Judge in Ceylon in November 1938 and acted as Legal Secretary to the Government of Ceylon from 1942 to 1946.

He succeeded Sir Joseph Sheridan as the Chief Justice of Kenya in 1946 and was knighted in the 1948 King's New Year Honours. He was forced to retire from the post in 1951 when he was appointed President of the Court of Appeal for Eastern Africa, Aden and the Seychelles. He retired from the colonial service in 1956, and later served on a part-time basis as Speaker of the then Tanganyika Legislative Assembly and back in Britain on the Mental Health Appeals Council. He died in Westminster, London in December 1975.

== See also ==
- Chief Justice of Kenya
