= Allan Hancox =

7th Chief Justice of Republic of Kenya

Allan Robin Winston Hancox, CBE (1932 – 1 January 2013) was a Chief Justice of Kenya. He served between 1989 and 1993, and was succeeded by Fred Kwasi Apaloo.

== Early career ==
Born and educated in England, Justice Hancox first joined the judiciary as a magistrate in Kenya Colony in 1957. He subsequently worked in Nigeria, before returning to Kenya in 1963 as a senior resident magistrate. In 1969, he was appointed a High Court Judge.

== Hancox Commission ==
In 1986, the then President Daniel arap Moi appointed Justice Hancox as the only member of a Commission Inquiring into the Insurance Industry.

== Honour ==
He was conferred a C.B.E. in the 1994 New Year Honours List.

== Retirement and death ==
He retired to live in Guernsey and became Assistant Magistrate for ten years. He died aged 80 years at the Aga Khan hospital in the town of Kisumu.

== See also ==
- Chief Justice of Kenya
- Court of Appeal of Kenya
- High Court of Kenya
