= Sexual Offences Act 2006 =

Act of Parliament in Kenya

Kenyan Parliament
- Passed by: 9th Parliament of Kenya
- Passed: 14 July 2006
- Enacted: 21 July 2006
- Status: Current legislation

The Sexual Offences Act, Act No. 3 of 2006, is an Act of the Parliament of Kenya that creates a range of sexual offences. The law was moved by then member of Parliament Njoki Susanna Ndung'u.

== Provisions ==
The law itemises a number of sexual crimes, including rape, including gang rape, incest, sexual assault, defilement of a child and other sexual offences against children. It also prohibits pimping, the abuse of positions of trust for sexual purposes, sexual exploitation of the mentally vulnerable, the intentional transmission of life-threatening sexually transmitted diseases and the administration of intoxicants, and requires the creation of a register of sex offenders.

The Act has been amended by a number of other Acts, including Act No. 3 of 2006, Act No. 7 of 2007, Act No. 6 of 2009, Act No. 8 of 2010, and Act No. 12 of 2012.

Section 13 of the Act, which dealt with child trafficking was repealed by the Counter-Trafficking in Persons Act, No. 8 of 2010, s. 5, which replaced it with its own provisions. Section 38 was deleted by Act No. 12 of 2012.
