= James Wicks =

3rd Chief Justice of Republic of Kenya

Sir James Haywood Wicks (20 June 1901 – 1 July 1989) was a British lawyer and to-date the longest serving Chief Justice of Kenya.

== Biography ==
Wicks was born at Colnbrook, Middlesex in 1901. He was educated at the Royal Grammar School, Guildford, King's College London, and Christ Church, Oxford. On graduation he qualified as a Chartered Surveyor and began practising in Guildford and London. He thereafter read law, and was called to the Bar at Gray's Inn in 1939. Following the outbreak of the Second World War he volunteered to serve in the Royal Air Force, achieving the rank of Squadron Leader and being mentioned in dispatches thrice. After the war, he resumed his legal career, first serving as Crown Counsel in Mandatory Palestine between 1946–1947. Thereafter he moved to Hong Kong serving as a Magistrate between 1948–1953 and a District Judge between 1954 and 58.

In 1958, upon his promotion to a Puisne Judge he moved to Kenya. In 1971, he was appointed Chief Justice of Kenya by Jomo Kenyatta and would remain in the post until his retirement in 1982. He was knighted in the Queen's 1972 New Year Honours. When he reached the mandatory retirement age of 68, the law was changed to enable him to continue, first to the ages of 70 and 72, and lastly until 74. During his time in office he oversaw the transition of power from Kenyatta to Daniel arap Moi and expanded the training of lawyers within the country. Following his retirement, he spent his last years in Guernsey, where he died in 1989.
