= Cecil Henry Ethelwood Miller =

6th Chief Justice of the Republic of Kenya

Cecil Henry Ethelwood Miller (1916 – 4 September 1989) was Guyanese-Kenyan former Chief Justice of Kenya. He served between 1986–1989 and was succeeded by Allan Robin Winston Hancox.

== The Miller Inquiry ==
In 1982 he chaired a Judicial Commission appointed to inquire into allegations involving former Attorney General of Kenya Charles Mugane Njonjo after appointment by President Daniel arap Moi.

== See also ==
- Chief Justice of Kenya
- Court of Appeal of Kenya
- High Court of Kenya
