= Robert William Hamilton =

Robert William Hamilton may refer to:

- Robert Hamilton (Liberal politician) (1867–1944), Scottish Member of Parliament for Orkney and Shetland
- Robert Hamilton (archaeologist) (1905–1995), British archaeologist and academic
- Robert William Hamilton Jr. (1930–2011), American physiologist
- Robert W. Hamilton (judge) (1899–1981), Justice of the Supreme Court of Texas
