= Mary Ang'awa =

Retired Kenyan Justice

Mary Ang'awa is a Kenyan retired judge and first woman chief magistrate.

== Education ==
Ang'awa went to Maxwell Preparatory School of the Seventh Day Adventist Church before she proceeded to Limuru Girls' School. In 1979, she graduated with a bachelor's degree from the University of Nairobi and a masters degree in 2005.

== Career ==
She started her career with Kibera Law Courts in 1980. She served as the Secretary to the Commission of Inquiry into the Insurance Industry from 1986 to 1988. She was the Chairperson of the Rent Restriction Tribunal between 1989 and 1991

== Fellowships/Affiliations ==
- Eisenhower Fellowships (1998)
- Visiting Fellow of the Federal Judicial Centre, Washington DC (1998)
- Fellow of the Chartered Institute of Arbitrators (2000)
- Jurisprudence of Equality Program (2001–2005)
- Chairperson of the Kenya Women Judges Association (2005–2010)
- Accredited Mediator of the Chartered Institute of Arbitrators (2016)
- Trustee of the President's Award Kenya
- Trustee of the Junior Golf Foundation
