= Kenya Medical Practitioners, Pharmacists and Dentists Union =

Healthcare WorkersUnion in Kenys

KMPDU
- Kenya Medical Practitioners, Pharmacists and Dentists Union=
- Health Care Is a Right
- Founded: 2017
- Headquarters: Nairobi, Kenya
- Location: Kenya
- Members: 8000+
- Website: kmpdu.org

The Kenya Medical Practitioners, Pharmacists and Dentists Union (KMPDU) is a trade union for medical doctors in Kenya. On February 13, 2017, seven union officials were jailed for a month for refusing to end their two-month strike over poor working conditions. The Kenyan opposition criticized the sentencing and blamed the government for the Kenyan health impasse. In solidarity with jailed union officials, private doctors announced a 48 hours strike, starting Wednesday. The Kenyan appeal court, ordered the release of the jailed union officials, in order to carry negotiations.

== Leadership ==
As of June 2026, the following are the leaders of the union. Dr. Abidan Mwachi, National Chairperson: Dr. Kahura Mundia; National Vice Chairperson, Dr Davji Bhimji Atellah secretary-general; Dr. Idan Miskellah, Deputy Secretary Genral, Dr Ida Nabwire, National Treasurer and Dr Renoh Omoro, Deputy National Treasurer.
