= Gladys Boss Shollei =

Kenyan politician

Honorable Gladys Jepkosgei Boss MGH, MP

Woman Representative for Uasin Gishu
- Incumbent
- Assumed office 8 August 2017
- Leader: Member of Parliament
- Preceded by: Eusilah Ngeny
- Majority: 139,245 (41.1%)

Personal details
- Born: 27 May 1974 (age 52) Uasin Gishu
- Party: UDA Party
- Spouse: Dr. Neil Richard Horn (m. 2023)
- Education: University of Nairobi; University of Cape Town; Jomo Kenyatta University of Agriculture and Technology

Gladys Jepkosgei Boss is a Kenyan politician who is currently the Deputy Speaker of the Kenya National Assembly and woman representative for Uasin Gishu County She is a member of the United Democratic Alliance.

== Early life ==
Gladys obtained a Bachelor of Laws degree from the University of Nairobi, a Diploma in Law from Kenya School of Law, a master's degree from the University of Cape Town, and an MBA from Jomo Kenyatta University of Agriculture and Technology.

She worked as a lecturer at the University of Nairobi and as Kenya's Deputy Chief Election Officer before becoming Chief Registrar of the Judiciary of Kenya.

She was dismissed from her position of Chief Registrar of the Judiciary in 2013 on grounds of gross misconduct and corruption. She challenged her dismissal in court, arguing she was not given an opportunity to defend herself and although the Industrial Court originally upheld the case in her favour, the Court of Appeal ruled in 2014 that her dismissal was lawful. In 2017 she was acquitted of criminal charges of corruption and abuse of office.

== Political career ==
She was elected to the National Assembly as woman representative for Uasin Gishu in the 2017 general election, representing the Jubilee Party. She is chairperson of the Committee on Delegated Legislation.

In 2018 she tabled a proposed constitutional amendment that would replace the county woman representative positions with new constituencies aimed at increasing the number of female members of parliament and county assemblies.

She sponsored the Kenya Reparations Bill 2019 that seeks to provide compensation for victims of historic human rights abuses.

In the August 2022 elections, she was re-elected as Uasin Gishu woman representative under a UDA ticket after garnering 292,154 votes against Independent candidate Kemei Dorcas Chebet, who received 54,742 votes.

=== Election results ===
General election 2017: Uasin Gishu
Party	Candidate	Votes	%
Jubilee	Gladys Boss	224,922	59.5
Independent	Rael Chebichii Lelei	85,677	22.6
Amani	Moira Jepkorir Chepkok	15,033	4.0
Maendeleo Chap Chap Party	Grace Kendagor Kipkemoi	7,313	1.9
KANU	Josephine Cheruto	5,446	1.4
Majority		139,245	41.1
Turnout			

== Personal life ==
Gladys Jepkosgei Boss is married to Dr Neil Richard Horn in 2023 Gladys was married to Sam Shollei before they divorced in 2021. She is mother to five children.
