= 2003 Ringera Judiciary Report =

The 2003 Ringera Judiciary Report was a Kenya Government report published by the Integrity and Anti-Corruption Committee of the Judiciary in Kenya in order to implement a policy known as radical surgery introduced by the new government of President Mwai Kibaki. The committee was led by Justice Aaron Ringera.

== Impact and aftermath ==
From the report 5 of 9 Court of Appeal Justices, 18 of 36 High Court Judges and 82 out of 254 Magistrates were implicated as corrupt. A two-week ultimatum to either resign or be dismissed was issued to these Justices and Magistrates. Several resigned or “retired”, while some mounted legal challenges against their dismissals. Tribunals to hear these cases then begun. Justice Philip Waki was acquitted in late 2004.
