= Section 320 of the Indian Penal Code =

Landmark judgements

Section 320 in India defines grievous hurt. The punishment is enhanced when the hurt is grievous.

== The text ==
The following kinds of hurt only are designated as "Grievous":

First

Emasculation

Second

Permanent privation of the sight of either eye

Third

Permanent privation of the hearing of either ear

Fourth

Privation of any member or joint

Fifth

Destruction or permanent impairing of the powers of any member or joint,

Sixth

Permanent disfiguration of the head or face

Seventh

Fracture or dislocation of a bone or tooth,

Eighth

Any hurt which endangers life or which causes the sufferer to be during the space of twenty days in severe bodily pain, or unable to follow his ordinary pursuits.
