= Jacob William Barth =

British lawyer (1871–1941)

Lieutenant-Colonel Sir Jacob William Barth CBE (23 July 1871 – 30 May 1941) was a British lawyer who served as the Attorney General of the East Africa Protectorate and Chief Justice of Kenya.

== Biography ==
Barth was born in London, United Kingdom in 1871. He attended Battersea Grammar School and matriculated from Wadham College, Oxford in 1890. Barth was admitted to Middle Temple and called to the bar on 27 June 1900. He served as Attorney General of the East Africa Protectorate between 1914 and 1918.

In 1920, he was appointed Chief Justice of Kenya and remained in the post until he retired in 1934.

He was made a Commander of the Order of the British Empire in 1916 and Knight Bachelor in 1922. Barth died in Albury, Surrey in 1941.

== See also ==
- Chief Justice of Kenya
- Attorney General of Kenya
