= Chief Justice of Kenya =

Head judge of the Kenyan Supreme Court

- Jaji Mkuu wa Mahakama ya Kenya
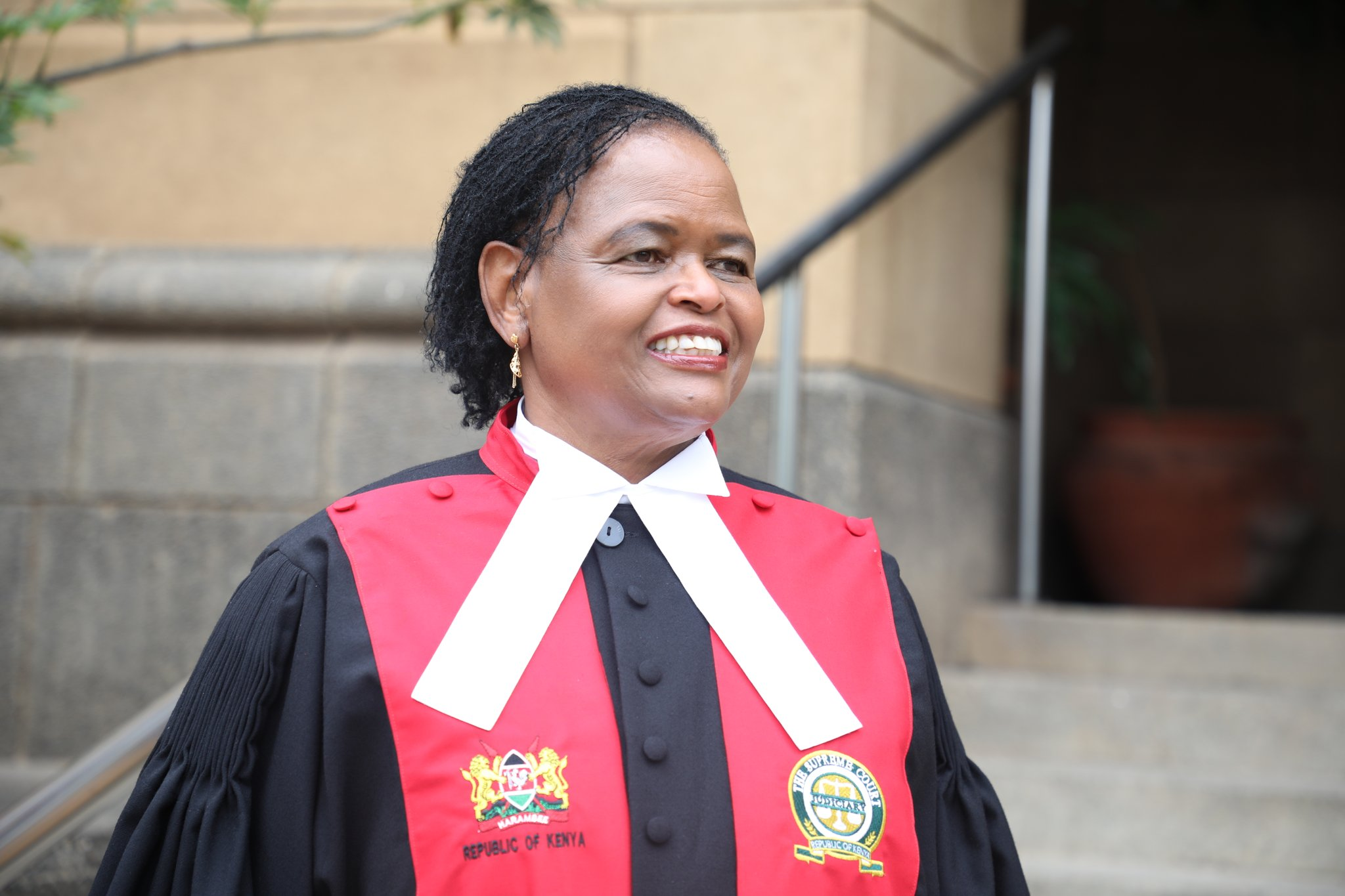
- Incumbent; Martha Koome
- Supreme Court of Kenya
- Style: The Honourable (formal); Your Lordship, Your Honor (within court, when addressed directly in court); Mrs. Chief Justice (informal)
- Type: Chief Justice
- Status: Presiding Judge
- Residence: Nairobi, Kenya
- Seat: Supreme Court of Kenya, Nairobi
- Nominator: President of Kenya
- Appointer: The President
- Term length: Until the age of seventy years
- Formation: 1906
- First holder: Sir Robert William Hamilton (Colonial); Kitili Maluki Mwendwa (Indigenous)
- Website: supremecourt.ke

The chief justice of Kenya (Swahili: Jaji Mkuu wa Mahakama ya Kenya) is a public office in the Republic of Kenya established under Article 161 of the country's Constitution as the head of the Judiciary of Kenya. Under Article 163, the chief justice also serves as the president of the Supreme Court of Kenya. The chief justice is assisted by the deputy chief justice, who also serves as the deputy president of the Supreme Court.

The current chief justice is Lady Justice Martha Koome, the first woman to serve as chief justice in Kenya.

== Appointment and tenure of office ==
Before the enactment of the Constitution of Kenya 2010, the president appointed the chief justice without any interview process or parliamentary approval. The chief justice did not enjoy security of tenure, and could be dismissed at the pleasure of the president.

Under the new Constitution, the chief justice is formally appointed by the president but is selected by the Judicial Service Commission following a competitive process involving a vacancy announcement, shortlisting of applicants and interviews. In order to be appointed as the chief justice, a person must have at least fifteen years experience as a legal practitioner. At the end of the interviews, the Judicial Service Commission selects one individual whose name is forwarded to Parliament for vetting and approval. If Parliament gives the candidate the green light, he is then formally appointed by the president.

In an attempt to give the president more leeway in appointing the chief justice, the Jubilee Coalition, while in power, pushed through a legislative amendment which required the Judicial Service Commission to provide three qualified individuals from which the president would appoint one as the chief justice. However, the constitutional court declared the amendment unconstitutional, and the new constitutional provision remains the only legal process of appointment of the chief justice.

Similar to other judges in the judiciary, the chief justice serves until they reach 70 years, with an option for early retirement once they reach the age of 65. However, no matter their age, an individual may not serve for more than ten years as chief justice. As such, an individual who serves for ten years as chief justice must retire from the office of the chief justice even if they are not yet 70 but may opt to stay on the Supreme Court as an associate justice until they reach 70.

The chief justice may be removed from office if a tribunal appointed to inquire into their conduct finds that they no longer legally fit for office.

In the event of a vacancy in the office of the chief justice, the deputy chief justice performs the role in an acting capacity until a new chief justice is appointed. Where the deputy chief justice position is also vacant, the senior-most associate justice of the Supreme Court will act as the president of the Supreme Court until a chief justice is named, and the next senior-most as the deputy president of the Supreme Court. An example of this occurred in 2016, when the senior associate justice Mohamed Ibrahim acted as the president of the Supreme Court following the early retirement of Chief Justice Willy Mutunga who turned 69 in June 2016, and the retirement of Deputy Chief Justice Kalpana Rawal who turned 70 in January 2016.

== Duties ==
The chief justice performs a wide range of judicial, administrative and ceremonial duties provided for under the Constitution and various statutes.

As the president and head of the Supreme Court of Kenya, the chief justice sits on the bench of the court and gives directions on which associate justices are to preside over cases. As the chairperson of the Judicial Service Commission, he/she has a lead role in setting policies for the administration of justice and the running of the judicial arm. The chief justice also takes part in the selection and recruitment of judges and magistrates who are appointed by the Judicial Service Commission.

He/she is also the administrative head of the judiciary, although the chief registrar of the judiciary is responsible for oversight over administrative matters.

The chief justice also presides over the swearing-in of the president, the deputy president and many other government officials and ceremoniously administers the oath that newly qualified lawyers take as they are admitted to the Roll of Advocates.

== List of chief justices ==
#	Name (birth–death)	Took office	Left office	Appointed by
East Africa Protectorate
1	Sir Robert Hamilton (1867–1944)	1906	1920	Sadler
Colony and Protectorate of Kenya
1	Sir Jacob Barth (1871–1941)	1920	1934	Northey
2	Sir Joseph Sheridan (1882–1964)	1934	1946	Byrne
3	Sir Barclay Nihill (1892–1975)	1946	1951	Mitchell
4	Sir Horace Hearne (1892–1962)	1951	1954	Mitchell
5	Sir Kenneth O’Connor (1896–1985)	1954	1957	Baring
6	Sir Ronald Sinclair (1903–1996)	1957	1963	Baring
7	Sir John Ainley (1906–1992)	1963	1963	MacDonald
Dominion of Kenya
1	Sir John Ainley (1906–1992)	1963	1964	MacDonald
Republic of Kenya
1	Sir John Ainley (1906–1992)	1964	1968	J. Kenyatta
2	Kitili Mwendwa (1929–1985)	1968	1971	J. Kenyatta
3	Sir James Wicks (1901–1989)	1971	1982	J. Kenyatta
4	Sir Alfred Simpson (1914–2003)	1982	1985	Moi
5	Chunilal Madan (1912–1989)	1985	1986	Moi
6	Cecil Miller (1916–1989)	1986	1989	Moi
7	Allan Hancox (1932–2013)	1989	1993	Moi
8	Fred Apaloo (1921–2000)	1993	1994	Moi
9	Abdul Majid Cockar (1923–2016)	1994	1997	Moi
10	Zachaeus Chesoni (1936–1999)	1997	1999	Moi
11	Bernard Chunga (1950–)	1999	2003	Moi
12	Johnson Gicheru (1941–2020)	2003	2011	Kibaki
13	Willy Mutunga (1947–)	2011	2016	Kibaki
14	David Maraga (1951–)	2016	2021	U. Kenyatta
15	Martha Koome (1960–)	2021		U. Kenyatta

== List of deputy chief justices ==
The office of Deputy Chief Justice was created for the first time under the 2010 Constitution.

1. Nancy Makokha Baraza (2011 - 2012)
2. Kalpana Rawal (2013 - 2016)
3. Philomena Mbete Mwilu (2016 - present)

== See also ==
- Judicial Service Commission (Kenya)
- Supreme Court of Kenya
