= High Court (Kenya) =

Highest court of Kenya

The High Court of Kenya is a court of unlimited original jurisdiction in criminal and civil matters established under article 165 of the Constitution of Kenya, 2010 as part of the Kenyan Judiciary. It also has supervisory jurisdiction over all other subordinate courts and any other persons, body or authority exercising a judicial or quasi-judicial function. It was known as the Supreme Court of Kenya until 1964. Its name has remained unchanged since then (while a new Supreme Court of Kenya was established under Article 163 of the Kenyan Constitution as the highest court in Kenya).

== Jurisdiction ==
The High Court has the following jurisdiction:

- unlimited original jurisdiction in criminal and civil matters;
- jurisdiction to determine the question whether a right or fundamental freedom in the Bill of Rights has been denied, violated, infringed or threatened;
- jurisdiction to hear an appeal from a decision of a tribunal appointed to consider the removal of a person from office, other than a tribunal appointed to consider the removal of judges from office;
- jurisdiction to hear any question respecting the interpretation of the Constitution including the determination of the question whether any law is inconsistent with or in contravention of the Constitution, the question whether anything said to be done under the authority of the Constitution or of any law is inconsistent with, or in contravention of, the Constitution, any matter relating to constitutional powers of State organs in respect of county governments and any matter relating to the constitutional relationship between the levels of government, and a question relating to conflict of laws.

The High Court is also a court of admiralty, and exercises admiralty jurisdiction in all matters arising on the high seas, or in territorial waters, or upon any lake or other navigable inland waters in Kenya.

== Organization and administration ==
=== Stations and divisions ===
There are forty five High Court stations and seven High Court Sub registries spread throughout 47 Counties in Kenya, with ongoing work to ensure that each of the 47 Counties has at least one High Court station.

In stations like Nairobi, Mombasa and Kisumu where the High Court has a heavy caseload and multiple judges, the Court is divided into Divisions. Each station or division is headed by a Presiding Judge. The Divisions are:

- Family & Children Division
- Commercial Division
- Admiralty Division
- Constitutional and Human Rights Division
- Judicial Review Division
- Criminal Division
- Civil Division
- Anti-Corruption & Economic Crimes Division

=== Principal Judge ===
Under the Constitution of Kenya 2010, the court is headed by a Principal Judge who is elected by the Judges of the Court from among themselves. The Principal Judge is answerable to the Chief Justice for the overall administration and management of the Court; ensuring the orderly and prompt conduct of the business of the Court; the constitution of benches of two or more judges in consultation with the Chief Justice; and undertaking of such other duties as may be assigned by the Chief Justice.

The current Principal Judge of the Court is Erick Kennedy Ogola who was elected on September 15, 2022, for a non-renewable five-year term.

==== List of Principal Judges ====
1. Hon Justice Richard Mwongo (2013 - 2018)
2. Hon Lady Justice Lydia Achode (2018 - 2022)
3. Hon Justice Eric Kennedy Ogola (2022–present)

=== Registrar of the High Court ===
There is a Registrar of the Court who is responsible for the setting up of the registry and maintenance of the registers of the Court as required under the law; the day to day administration and management of the Court; and overseeing of support services in the Court including the planning, development and the organization of staff of the court as provided for under High Court (Organization and Administration) Act.

Under the repealed Constitution of Kenya, the Registrar of the High Court was the overall chief administrator of the Judiciary. The overall administrator under the 2010 Constitution is the Chief Registrar of the Judiciary.

The current Registrar is Clara Otieno-Omondi who was appointed in July 2023.

==== List of Registrars of the High Court ====
1963 - 2010

During this period, the Registrar of the High Court served as the overall administrator of the Judiciary.

1. John Robert McReady (August 1968 - 1970)
2. James Onyiego Nyarangi (17 June 1970 – 10 May 1972)
3. Zaccheus Chesoni (11 May 1972 – 16 Jan 1974)
4. Vijay Kapila (17 Jan 1974 – 1978)
5. Sardar Pritam Singh Brar (1 Jan 1978 – 22 Sept 1981)
6. Jamnandas Somabhai Patel (22 Sept 1981 – 29 Dec 1983)
7. Abdul Rauf Samnakay (30 Dec 1983 – 18 Oct 1984)
8. John Wycliffe Mwalati Mwera (19 October 1984 – 1990)
9. Jacob Letia Ole Kipury (20 Feb 1990 - 1 March 2002)
10. William Ouko (4 March 2002 – 2004)
11. Charles Njai (22 April 2004 – 15 Nov 2007)
12. Christine Meoli (16 Nov 2007 – 27 Feb 2008)
13. Lydiah Achode (28 Feb 2008 – 22 Aug 2011)

Post 2010 Constitution

Under the 2010 Constitution, the Registrar of the High Court serves as the administrator of the High Court only and reports to the Chief Registrar of the Judiciary who is the overall administrator of the Judiciary.

1. Hon Lady Justice Judith Omange (2011 - 2022)
2. Hon Pauline Mbulikah (Acting) (2022 - June 2023)
3. Hon Clara Otieno-Omondi (July 2023 – present)

== Composition ==
The High Court consists of a Principal Judge and not more than two hundred judges. As of March 2022, there were 79 Judges of the High Court with an ongoing recruitment of 20 additional judges.

A single judge presides over the court. However, parties to a case are at liberty to request that their cases be heard by an odd number of judges being not less than three, where the case raises significant constitutional issues. In such cases, the Chief Justice picks the judges who are to preside over these cases. Most of these cases are heard by 3 judges. A few exceptional cases are heard by five judges.

=== Current Justices ===
The following are the current justices of the High Court:

- Eric Kennedy Ogola – Principal Judge of the High Court
- Roseline P. V. Wendoh
- George Matatia Abaleka Dulu
- Mary Muhanji Kasango
- Joseph R. Karanja
- Florence N. Muchemi
- Maureen Akinyi Odero
- Said Juma Chitembwe
- Joseph Sergon
- Edward Muthoga Muriithi
- Kanyi Kimondo
- David Amilcar S. Majanja – Representative in the Judicial Service Commission
- Cecilia Wathaiya Githua
- Christine W. Meoli
- Hedwig Imbosa Ong’udi
- Stella Ngali Mutuku
- James Wakiaga
- Rose Atieno Ougo
- George Vincent Odunga
- Hilary Kiplagat Chemitei
- Roseline C. Lagat Korir
- Richard Mururu Mwongo
- Morgan M Mercedes
- Jayden Njoroge Njoroge
- Abigail Mshila
- Musyoka William Musya
- Jacqueline N. Kamau
- Manyang kang Chol
- Divine Kupesa Mfuti
- Prince Taylor
- Enock Mwita
- Israel Dinga
- Lincan jdhj
- Robert Limo
- Roselyne Aburili
- Grace Nzioka
- Justus Bwonwonga
- Janet Mulwa
- Margaret Muigai
- Stephen Riechi
- Olga Sewe
- Wilfrida Okwany
- Patrick Otieno
- Anthony Ndung’u
- Mugure Thande
- Margaret Mwangi
- Stephen Githinji
- Dorah O. Chepkwony
- Asenath Ongeri
- Kiarie Waweru Kiarie
- Lucy Njuguna
- Reuben Nyakundi
- Onyiego John Nyabuto
- Cherere Thrispisa Wanjiku Wamae
- Ogola Daniel Ogembo
- Gitari Lucy Waruguru
- Ngetich Rachel C. Biomondo
- Kemei David Kipyegomen
- Onginjo Anne Colleta Apondi
- Matheka Teresia Mumbua
- Nyagah Jesse Njagi
- Martin Muya
- Gichohi Patricia Njeri
- Josephine Wayua Wambua
- Nyaundi Patricia Mande
- Diana Kavedza Rachel
- Chirchir Sophie Chebet
- Prof. (Dr.) Sifuna Nixon Wanyama
- Shariff Mwanaisha Saida
- Chigiti John Mugwimi
- Nyaga Heston Mbogo
- Mulwa Peter Mutua
- Nthiga Lawrence Mugambi
- Mutai Gregory
- Wananda John Robert Anuro
- Mohochi Samwel Mukira
- Olei Francis Rayola Ochieng Odhiambo
- Dr. Githiru Freda Mugambi
- Magare Dennis Kizito Ng’wono
- Macharia Florence Wangari
- Odera Teresa Achieng
- Visram Aleem Alnashir

=== Former justices ===
The following are some of the former justices of the High Court:

- John W. Mwera – Appointed Judge of Appeal on 8 November 2012
- George B. M. Kariuki – Appointed Judge of Appeal on 8 November 2012
- Mohammed K. Ibrahim – Appointed Judge of the Supreme Court on 16 June 2011
- Jackton Boma Ojwang – Appointed Judge of the Supreme Court on 16 June 2011
- Daniel K. Musinga – Appointed Judge of Appeal on 8 November 2012
- Festus Azangalala – Appointed Judge of Appeal on 8 November 2012
- Milton S. A Makhandia – Appointed Judge of Appeal on 8 November 2012
- Abudullahi Warsame – Appointed Judge of Appeal on 8 November 2012
- William Ouko – Appointed Judge of Appeal on 8 November 2012
- Philomena Mbete Mwilu – Appointed Judge of Appeal on 8 November 2012
- Grace Ngenye Wangui – Appointed Judge of Appeal
- Lydia Awino Achode – Appointed Judge of Appeal
- Beatrice Thuranira Jaden – Deceased
- George Vincent Odunga – Appointed Judge of Appeal
- Weldon Korir Kipyegon – Appointed Judge of Appeal
- Pauline Nyamweya – Appointed Judge of Appeal
- Jessie W. Lesiit – Appointed Judge of Appeal
- John Mativo – Appointed Judge of Appeal
- Amraphael Mbogholi Msagha – Appointed Judge of Appeal
- Frederick A. Ochieng’ – Appointed Judge of Appeal
- Luka K. Kimaru – Appointed Judge of Appeal
- A. O. Muchelule – Appointed Judge of Appeal
- Joel Ngugi Mwaura – Appointed Judge of Appeal
- Ngugi Grace Mumbi – Appointed Judge of Appeal

== Notable cases ==
The High Court in Kibera under Judge Diana Kavedza is currently handling the trial of eight accused arsonists. The minor students of Utumishi Girls' Academy are alleged to have set fire to a dormitory on 28 May, leading to 16 deaths. They were charged with murder contrary to Section 203 as read with Section 204 of the Penal Code on 1 July. Each pleaded not guilty.
