= 2025 Kenyan protests =

Anti-government protests in Kenya in 2025

- Part of Gen Z protests
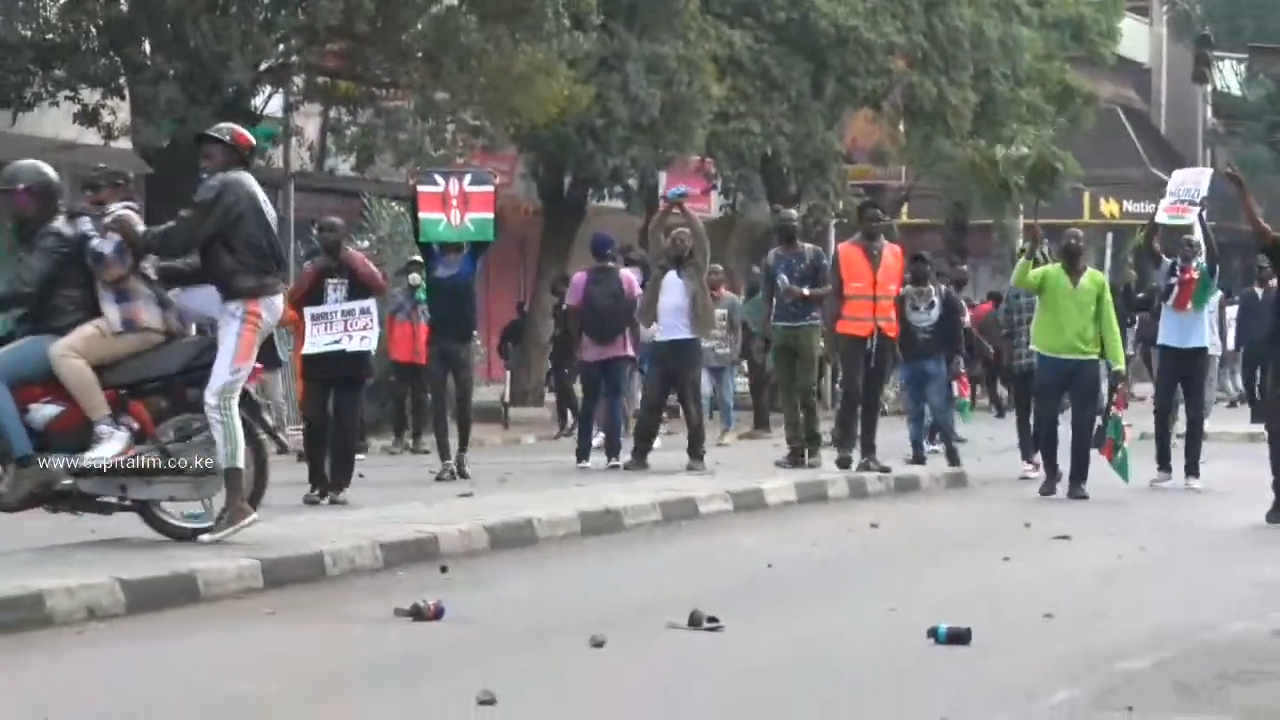
- Protesters in Nairobi
- Date: 9 June 2025 – 7 July 2025
- Location: Kenya
- Caused by: Introduction of Kenya Finance Bill 2024 and subsequent death of Albert Ojwang
- Goals: Resignation of William Ruto's government

Casualties
- Deaths: 65
- Injuries: 553+
- Arrested: ≥1,500

The 2025 Kenyan protests were a series of youth-led demonstrations that took place from June to July 2025 in Kenya. They were caused by the death of Albert Omondi Ojwang in police custody and by public discontent over rising living costs, government corruption, and police brutality. These events built on the momentum of the 2024 Kenya Finance Bill protests, where demonstrations against proposed tax hikes led to 65 deaths and the storming of Parliament on 25 June 2024, prompting President Ruto to veto the bill. Public dissatisfaction still persists due to ongoing economic challenges and a perceived lack of accountability for police violence.

== Background ==
Major protests against the government of Kenyan President William Ruto first emerged in 2024, with the introduction of the Kenya Finance Bill. The bill proposed an increase in taxation, leading to protests.

A year later on 6 June 2025, Kenyan blogger and teacher Albert Omondi Ojwang was arrested by police on charges of "false publication", reportedly in connection with a post on X (formerly Twitter) that criticized the Deputy Inspector General of Police Eliud Lagat. Ojwang died in police custody two days later. According to a police statement he "sustained head injuries after hitting his head against the cell wall" and was subsequently "rushed to Mbagathi hospital, where he was pronounced dead on arrival". Ojwang's death, along with broader public concerns over rising living costs and political corruption, led to the outbreak of demonstrations on 9 June 2025.

The protests were largely organized over social media by Gen Z Kenyans. Youth activists who rallied the protestors had no leadership or formal structure. Some supporters of the movement have argued the lack of a centralized leadership represents a major strength, while others have argued for the need of a collective leadership in order to become a more serious force.

== Events ==
On 9 June 2025, protesters gathered in Nairobi. Continued protests were met by police response the following week. On 25 June, thousands of protesters gathered to commemorate protests over the Kenya Finance Bill. Protesters planned to commemorate the previous year's protests and at the same time express their fury against the killing of Ojwang.

A total of 65 people died in clashes against police since 17 June, including 50 in the first two weeks, and at least 500 others were injured. In total, more than 120 people died across Kenya since last year in police crackdowns on waves of protests. As a result of the protests, acting speaker David Ochieng Ouma temporarily adjourned the National Assembly on 25 June.

On 30 June, mask vendor and bystander Boniface Kariuki succumbed to his injuries after being shot in the head at close range by a police officer on 17 June in Nairobi. The shooting was captured on camera. He was declared brain-dead in hospital by doctors at the national referral hospital. Two police officers were arrested over the shooting on the same day. On 11 July, a funeral was held for Kariuki with hundreds of mourners attending.

Although the protests had dissipated by 1 July, they resumed on 7 July, known in Kenya as Saba Saba Day, to coincide with the 35th anniversary of the 1990 pro-democracy march. 41 people were killed and 29 others were injured after officers fired and hurled tear gas canisters, opened fire and used water cannons on protestors. Dozens of officers also sustained injuries after being hit with stones. One of those killed, 12-year-old Bridgit Njoki, was shot in the head when a single bullet pierced the roof, puncturing the ceiling and striking her while she was watching television in the living room of her house. She was pronounced dead at the hospital within hours.

On 9 July, President William Ruto told police that "anyone caught burning another person's business or property should be shot in the leg, hospitalised, and later taken to court. Don't kill them, but ensure their legs are broken".

On 24 July, the watchdog organization Independent Policing Oversight Authority (IPOA) released a report that connected most of the protest deaths to police use of "disproportionate force".

== Arrests ==
On 15 July, Interior Cabinet Secretary Kipchumba Murkomen announced that 1,500 Kenyans had been arrested in connection with the protests and faced charges of terrorism, murder, robbery with violence, arson, property damage and sexual assault. Murkomen characterized the protests as "raw and unprecedented terror," and protesters as "marauding gangs of looters and barefaced anarchists". However, reporting by The Guardian in early August suggested that Kenyan police had made some arrests at random, including of people fully uninvolved with the protests. The outlet also reported that those arrested were subject to high bails, including some multiple times higher than a monthly salary.

In light of the many arrests, some lawyers offered their services for free to protesters, and fundraising campaigns were mounted to secure bail money.

Police officer Klinzy Baraza was arrested and tried before the Milimani law courts on 10 July. He was accused of murdering a mask hawker, Boniface Mwangi Kariuki. He was denied a release on bail and is still in detention. The case is still ongoing with a ruling on whether he should be released on bail still pending.

== Missing abducted protestors ==
According to a Human Right's Watch World Report 2026, 16 people abducted in the 2025 protests are still missing and their whereabouts remain unknown as of early 2026.

== Responses ==
Several civil organizations, including the Law Society of Kenya and the International Justice Mission – Kenya (IJM), have suggested that the arresting and charging of protesters with serious crimes are meant to suppress dissent, rather than pursuing actual justice.

On 7 July, Amnesty Kenya criticized proposed legislation to further curtail the right to assembly. On 8 July, the UN rights office called for the Kenyan government to use restraint in their treatment of protesters.

== See also ==
- List of protests in the 21st century
