= Kasmuel McOure =

Kenyan activist

- Kasmuel McOure
- Born: October 1997 (age 28–29); Nairobi
- Other name: KasKazini
- Citizenship: Kenya
- Education: Technical University of Kenya
- Occupation: Political activist
- Political party: ODM

Kasmuel McOure (born October 1997) is a Kenyan ODM Youth League Member. He rose to controversial fame during the 2024 Gen Z Protests and has since then been engaging in political activism, debates and discussions. He is currently a member of the ODM party. He is associated with the Luo community.

== Early life and education ==
Kasmuel attended his high school at Alliance High School and later on joined Maranda High School where he completed his high school education. He then joined Technical University of Kenya in 2016 where he pursued a degree in Bachelor of Commerce in Finance and Financial Management Services. He finished his higher education from TUK in 2020.

== Political career ==
Kasmuel rose to controversial fame during the 2024 Anti-finance bill demonstrations, which ended when President Ruto withdrew the bill in its entirety. He also gained a huge following on his Twitter account as a result and became one of the influential voices on the platform at the time. This got him detained and was later released after going missing for two days. From there he went on to engage in political discussions, media interviews and debates, making him a known controversial youth figure in Kenyan politics. In November 2024 he joined the ODM Party youth wing amidst criticism from fellow youth online and later on stated that he joined the Orange party to become a part of something greater and be at the forefront of change.

He has expressed interest in running for political office in the upcoming 2027 general elections. His interactions with top politicians sparked both support and heavy criticism, notable being the late Raila Odinga, from whom he claimed he sought political advice and monetary support.

== Outside politics ==
Besides politics, Kasmuel is a musician; guitarist and pianist and plays traditional and contemporary music styles. He is the leader, founder, and director of Maskani Big Band, which he formed in 2020 with his friend Stephen Mutangili. He is also an advocate of Mental Health Awareness inspired by his triumph against mental illness and suicidal thoughts.

== Personal life ==
Kasmuel is currently unmarried. .

== See also ==
- Aya Chebbi
- Boniface Mwangi
- Hanifa Adan
- Kenya Finance Bill protests
- Maverick Aoko
- Nanjala Nyabola
