= 2024 storming of the Kenyan Parliament =

Storming of the Kenyan parliament by protesters

- Part of Kenya Finance Bill protests
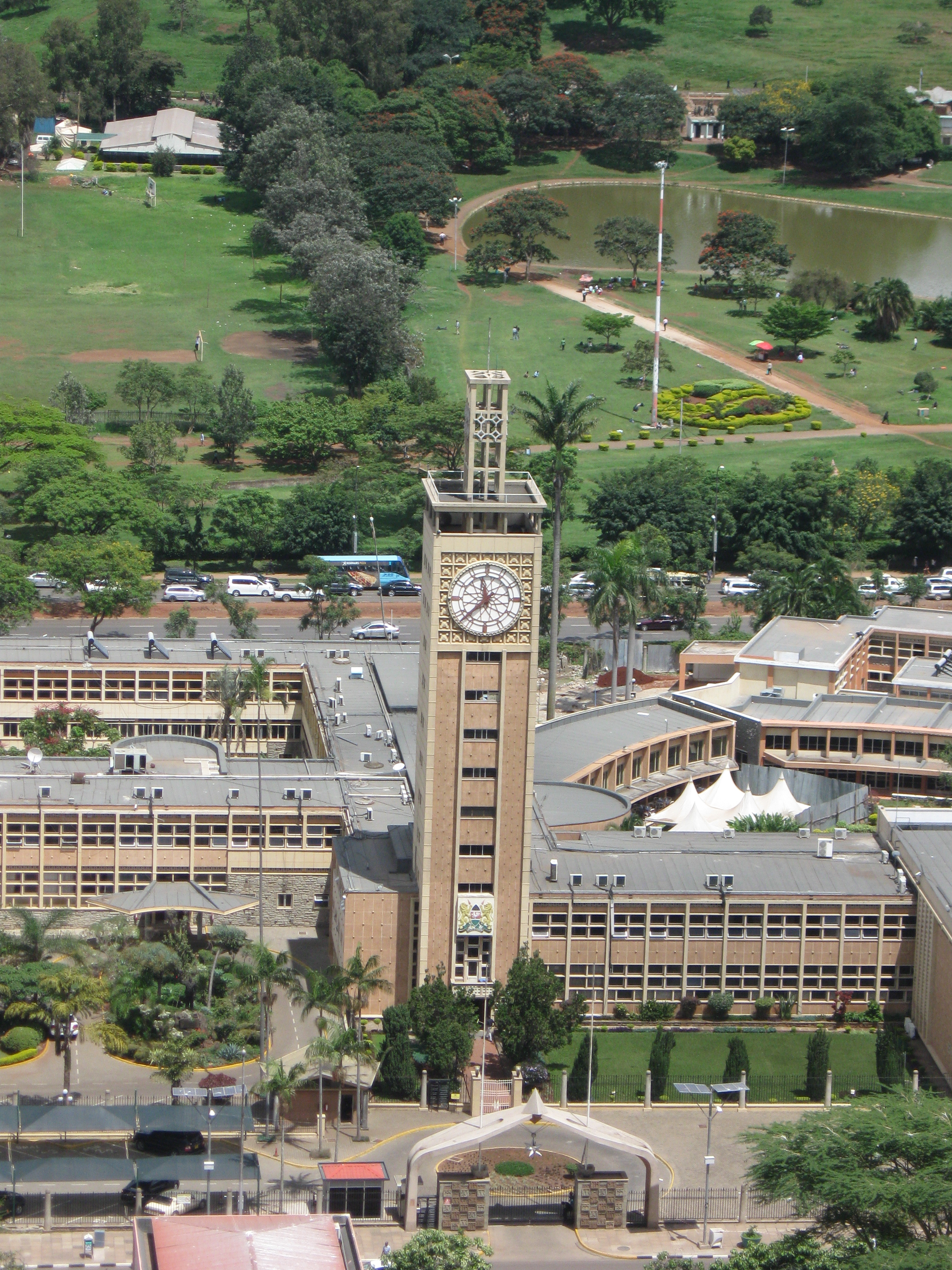
- Parliament Building in 2015
- Date: 25 June 2024
- Location: Parliament Building, Nairobi, Kenya
- Caused by: Passing of the Kenya Finance Bill 2024 by the Parliament of Kenya
- Result: Bill vetoed by President Ruto

Parties
Protesters	Kenya Police

Casualties and losses
Deaths: 1 (Note: 60 people died at the capital, with a total of 22 people dead from the protests.); Injuries: 200+; Arrests: 130+	none

On 25 June 2024, thousands of protesters stormed the Kenyan Parliament Building in Nairobi in response to the passing of the Kenya Finance Bill 2024, part of a larger series of protests against the proposed tax increases. The protest escalated when the police opened fire and killed peaceful protesters. Nineteen people died in Nairobi during the demonstrations as the police responded by shooting at the protesters. President William Ruto vetoed the bill the following day.

== Background ==
The assault was triggered by the passage of a new finance bill on 25 June 2024 that was met with widespread public disapproval due to its proposed tax increases and had resulted in protests since it was unveiled on 18 June. The bill imposed a 16% tax on goods and services for the construction and equipping of specialized hospitals, and increased import taxes from 2.5% to 3%. Certain initial proposals, including a 16% sales tax on bread and 25% duty on cooking oil, were dropped beforehand because of public opposition. The passage of the bill was boycotted by opposition MPs, who left the chamber during the parliamentary session.

== Incident ==
Protesters, many of whom were youth, overwhelmed the police and entered the parliament building shortly after the finance bill was passed. Thousands broke through police barriers and stormed the compound. Part of the building was also set on fire, while several rooms were ransacked and cars parked outside were vandalised. The ceremonial mace used in legislative proceedings was stolen. MPs who were inside the building fled the scene through tunnels. Police also opened fire on the protesters. A major internet disruption was recorded by NetBlocks in Kenya "amidst a deadly crackdown by police".

=== Other incidents ===
The nearby office of the governor of Nairobi City County was also set on fire. Protesters tried to storm the State House in Nakuru. Protests also occurred in Mombasa, Eldoret, Kisumu and Nyeri. In Embu, the offices of the ruling United Democratic Alliance were set on fire. Looting was reported in Nairobi, while several buildings in Eldoret were also set on fire.

== Casualties ==
According to the Kenya National Commission on Human Rights, 19 people died during demonstrations in Nairobi with over 160 people being treated for injuries. Amnesty International reported that over 200 people were injured. Activists, Martin Kimunya and Auma Obama was injured by tear gas while protesting at the Parliament Building.

== Aftermath ==
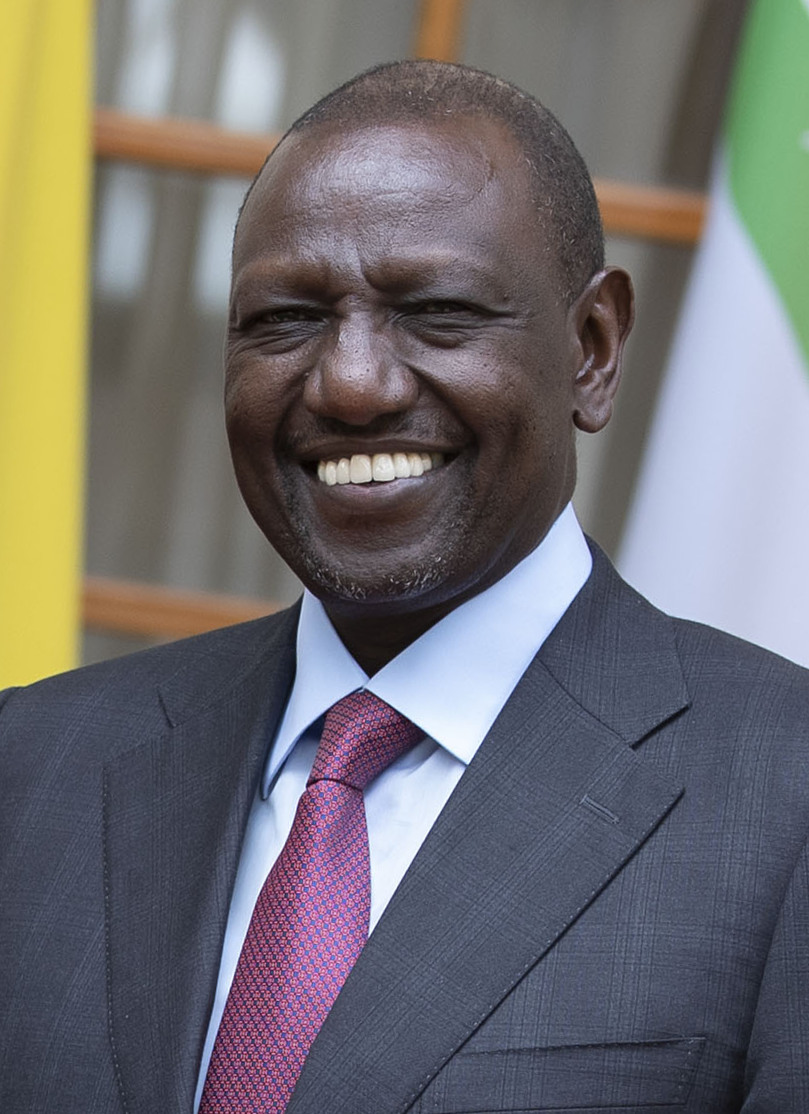
President William Ruto declined to sign the controversial finance bill a day after the attack.

The assault on the building was the most direct attack on the Kenyan Government in decades. In an address to the nation following the attack, President William Ruto described the incident as "treasonous" and said that the demonstrations had been "hijacked by dangerous people". He also pledged a strong response against "violence and anarchy." The Kenya Defence Forces were subsequently deployed to help restore order. Soldiers reportedly injured "hundreds" of people with tear gas and rubber bullets when they cleared out a medical camp that had been set up for injured protesters. In the Nairobi suburb of Githurai, police said they had used more than 700 blank rounds in an overnight operation to disperse protesters.

On 26 June, activists called for peaceful protests on 27 June to oppose the finance bill and to honor those killed in the violence. That same day, Ruto announced that he was rejecting and withdrawing the finance bill. On 5 July, Ruto pledged to act against “rogue” police officers who fired at unarmed civilians during the protests, including in the storming of parliament.

== Reactions ==
=== Domestic ===
Opposition leader Raila Odinga condemned the crackdown on protestors and urged the withdrawal of the finance bill. Former president Uhuru Kenyatta called for dialogue, saying that the country's leaders should "know that power and authority is donated to them by the people". Faith Odhiambo, the President of the Law Society of Kenya, stated that everyone involved, actively or passively, must be held accountable for their actions. The Kenya Human Rights Commission urged President Ruto to issue an immediate order to "stop the killings". A group of Catholic bishops also urged police not to attack protesters and called on the government to listen to grievances over the "unwarranted" taxes.

=== International ===
Chairman of the African Union Commission Moussa Faki called for "peace, security and stability" in Kenya. Diplomats from the United States and 12 other western countries expressed shock at the violence in parliament, while United Nations Secretary-General António Guterres also expressed concern. Amnesty International said that "the pattern of policing protests is deteriorating fast" and called on the government to respect the right to assembly.

== See also ==
- List of attacks on legislatures
