= Terror (politics) =

Policy of political repression and violence

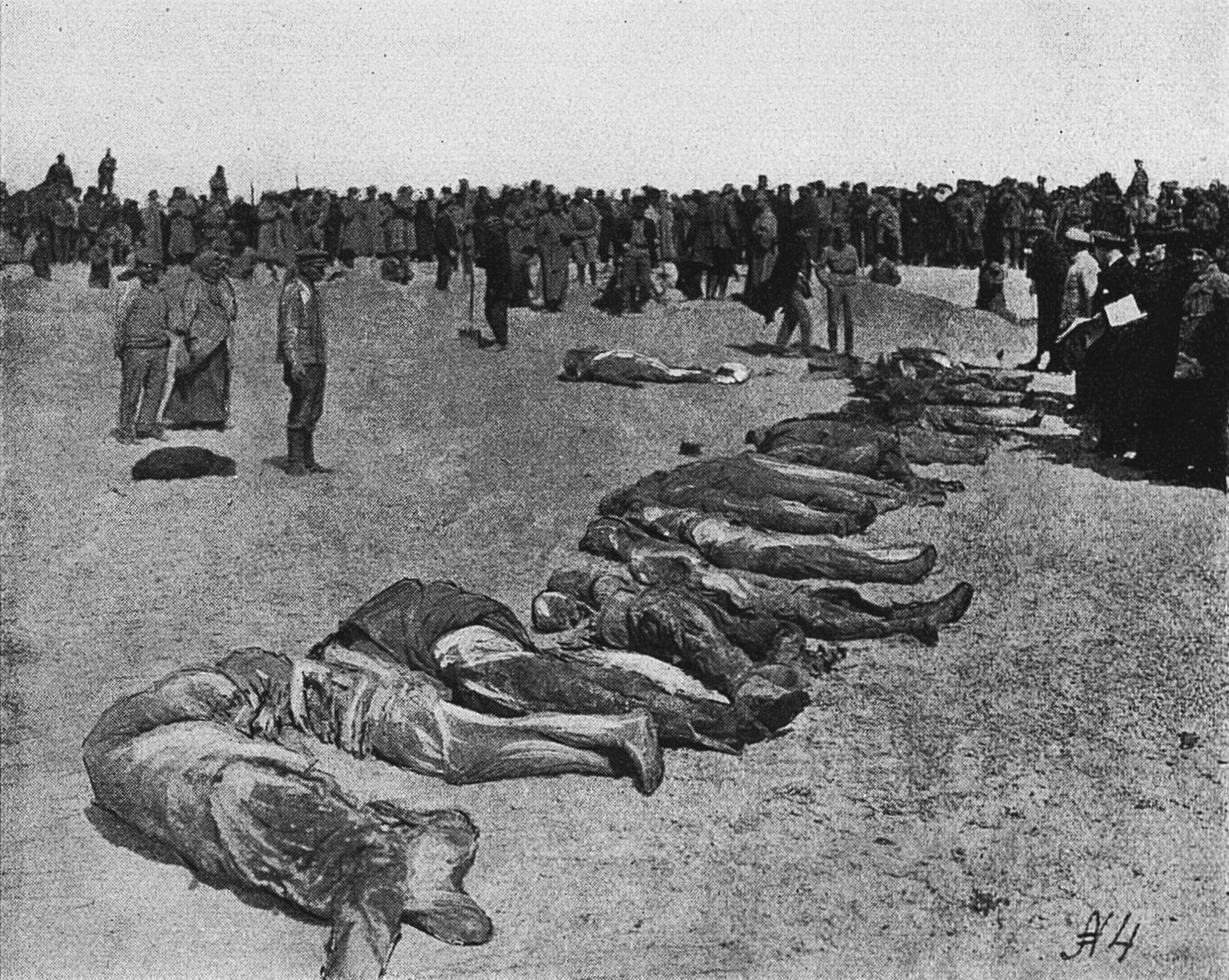
Victims of the Red Terror in Crimea, 1918

Terror (from French terreur, from Latin terror "great fear", terrere "to frighten") is a policy of political repression and political violence intended to subdue political opposition. The term first appears in the Reign of Terror, a revolutionary violence during the French Revolution, which also gave rise to the term terrorism.

== Terror and terrorism ==
Charles Tilly defines "terror" as a political strategy defined as "asymmetrical deployment of threats and violence against enemies using means that fall outside the forms of political struggle routinely operating within some current regime", and therefore ranges from "(1) intermittent actions by members of groups that are engaged in wider political struggles to (2) one segment in the modus operandi of durably organized specialists in coercion, including government-employed and government-backed specialists in coercion to (3) the dominant rationale for distinct, committed groups and networks of activists". According to Tilly, the term "terror" spans a wide range of human cruelties, from Stalin's use of executions to clandestine attacks by groups like the Basque separatists and the Irish Republican Army and even ethnic cleansing and genocide.

== State terrorism ==
State terrorism is terrorism conducted by a state against its own citizens or another state's citizens.

== Revolutionary and counter-revolutionary terror ==
Revolutionary terror, also known as "Red Terror", was often used by revolutionary governments to suppress counterrevolutionaries. The first example was the Reign of Terror during the French Revolution in 1794. Other notable examples include the Red Terror in Soviet Russia in 1918–1922, as well as simultaneous campaigns in the Hungarian Soviet Republic and in Finland. In China, Red Terror in 1966 and 1967 started the Cultural Revolution.

Counter-revolutionary terror is usually referred to as "White Terror". Notable examples are the terror campaigns in France (1794–1795), in Russia (1917–1923), in Hungary (1919–1921), and in Spain (1936–1947). Modern examples of counter-revolutionary terror include Operation Condor in South America.

== Legal prosecution ==
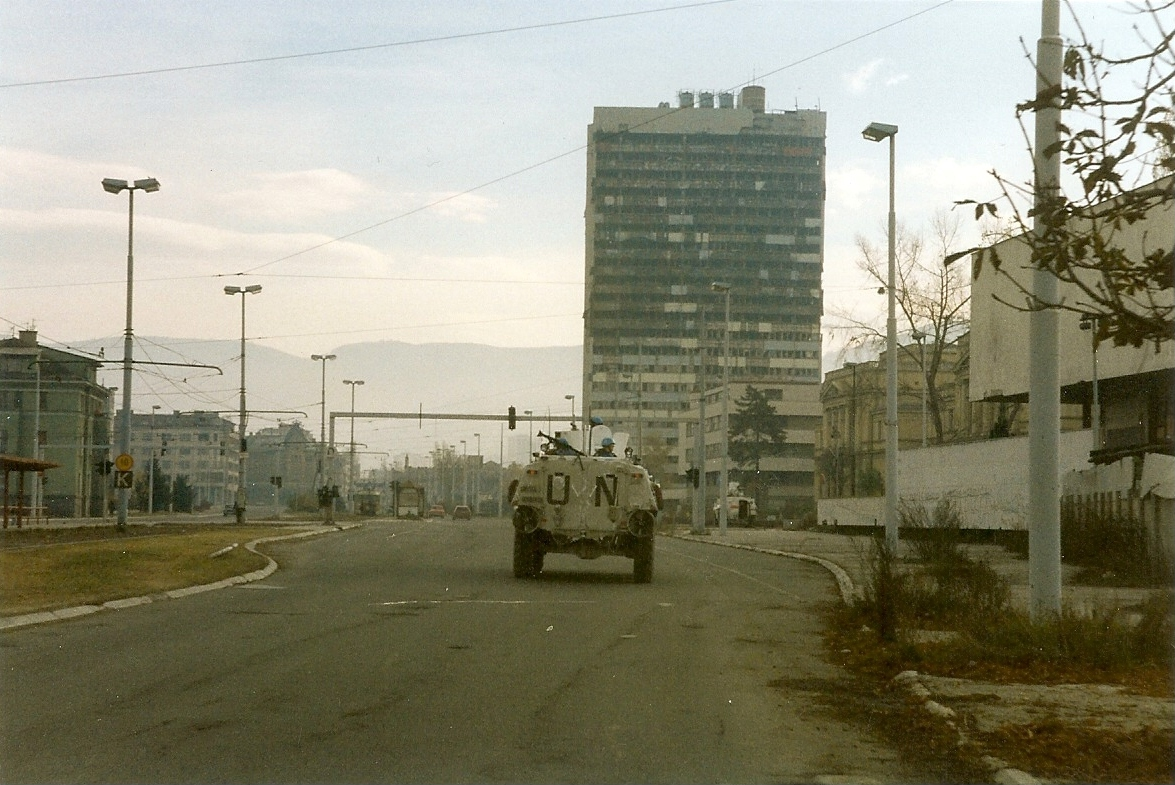
The ICTY Tribunal convicted several people for terror in relation to Siege of Sarajevo

The Hague-based International Criminal Tribunal for the former Yugoslavia (ICTY) found Stanislav Galić, the Bosnian Serb commander of the Sarajevo-Romanija Corps of the Army of Republika Srpska (VRS), Radovan Karadžić, the President of Republika Srpska, and Ratko Mladić, Chief of Staff of VRS, guilty of terror as a crime against humanity, among other crimes, for their role in the Siege of Sarajevo during the Bosnian War, and sentenced them each to life imprisonment.

In the Galić judgement, the ICTY found that the term "terror" refers to an attack or targeting of civilians or civilian property not justified by military necessity, its only objective being spreading extreme fear among civilian population. It was declared a violation of the Laws or Customs of War (Article 51 of Additional Protocol I to the Geneva Conventions of 1949). The legal defense of Galić argued that the defendant cannot be convicted of terror due to the rule Nulla poena sine lege, but the Tribunal found that the first conviction for terror against a civilian population was already delivered previously in July 1947 by a court-martial sitting in Makassar in the Netherlands East-Indies, during the Indonesian National Revolution, and was therefore applicable.

== See also ==
- Balance of terror
- Demoralization (warfare)
- Political terror scale
- Shock and awe
