= Parliament Buildings (Kenya) =

Seat of the Kenyan Parliament in Nairobi

Parliament Building
- Majengo ya Bunge la Kenya (Swahili)
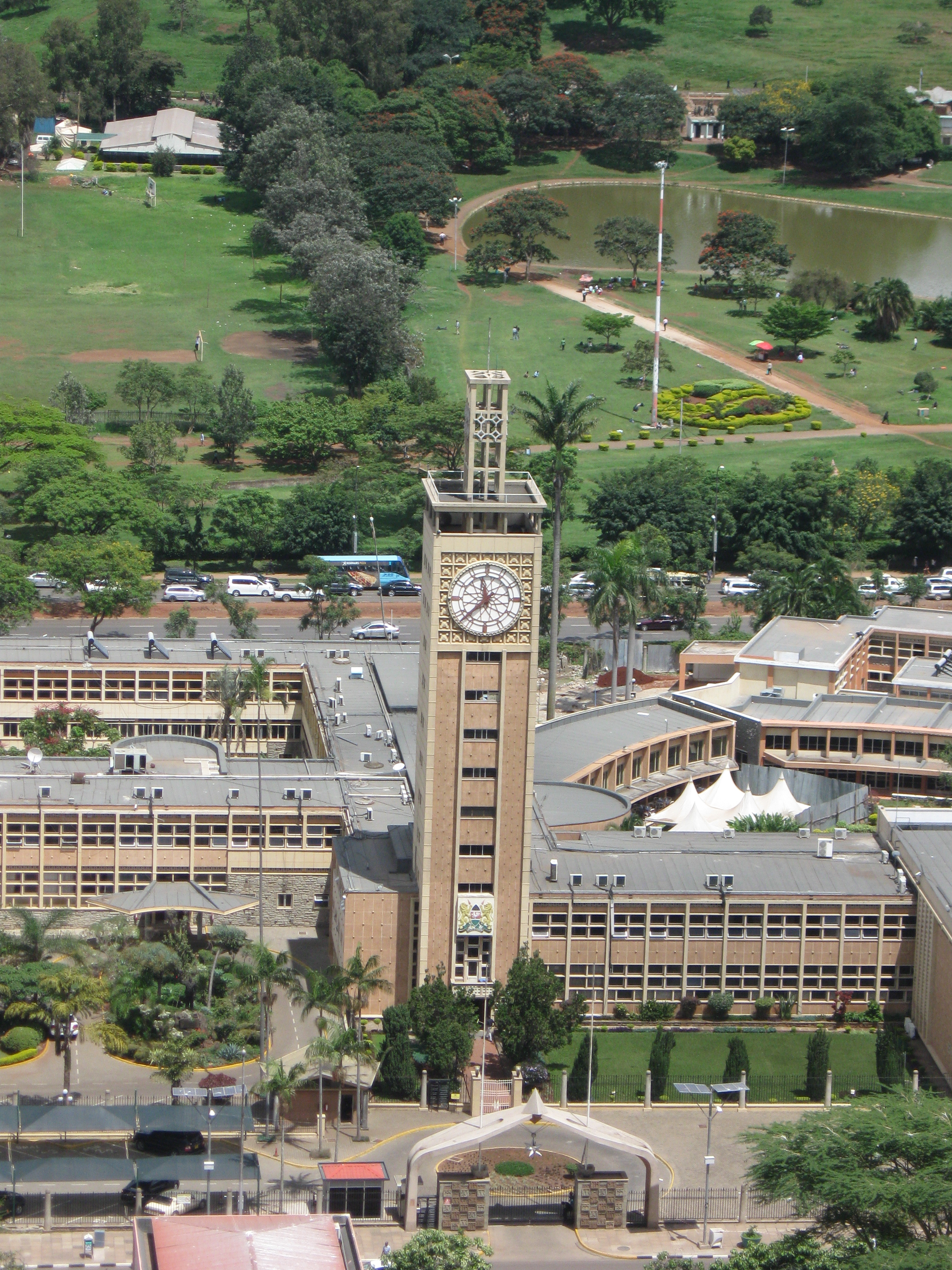
- Interactive map of the Parliament Building area
- Alternative names: Parliament House

General information
- Status: Completed
- Type: Legislative building
- Architectural style: Neoclassical architecture
- Location: Nairobi, Kenya, Kenya
- Coordinates: 1°17′24″S 36°49′12″E
- Current tenants: Parliament of Kenya
- Construction started: 1951
- Construction stopped: 1954
- Owner: Government of Kenya

Technical details
- Material: Concrete and steel

Design and construction
- Architect: Amyas Connell

Website
- www.parliament.ke

The Parliament Buildings (Swahili: Majengo ya Bunge la Kenya) in Nairobi are the seat of the Kenyan Parliament.

== History ==
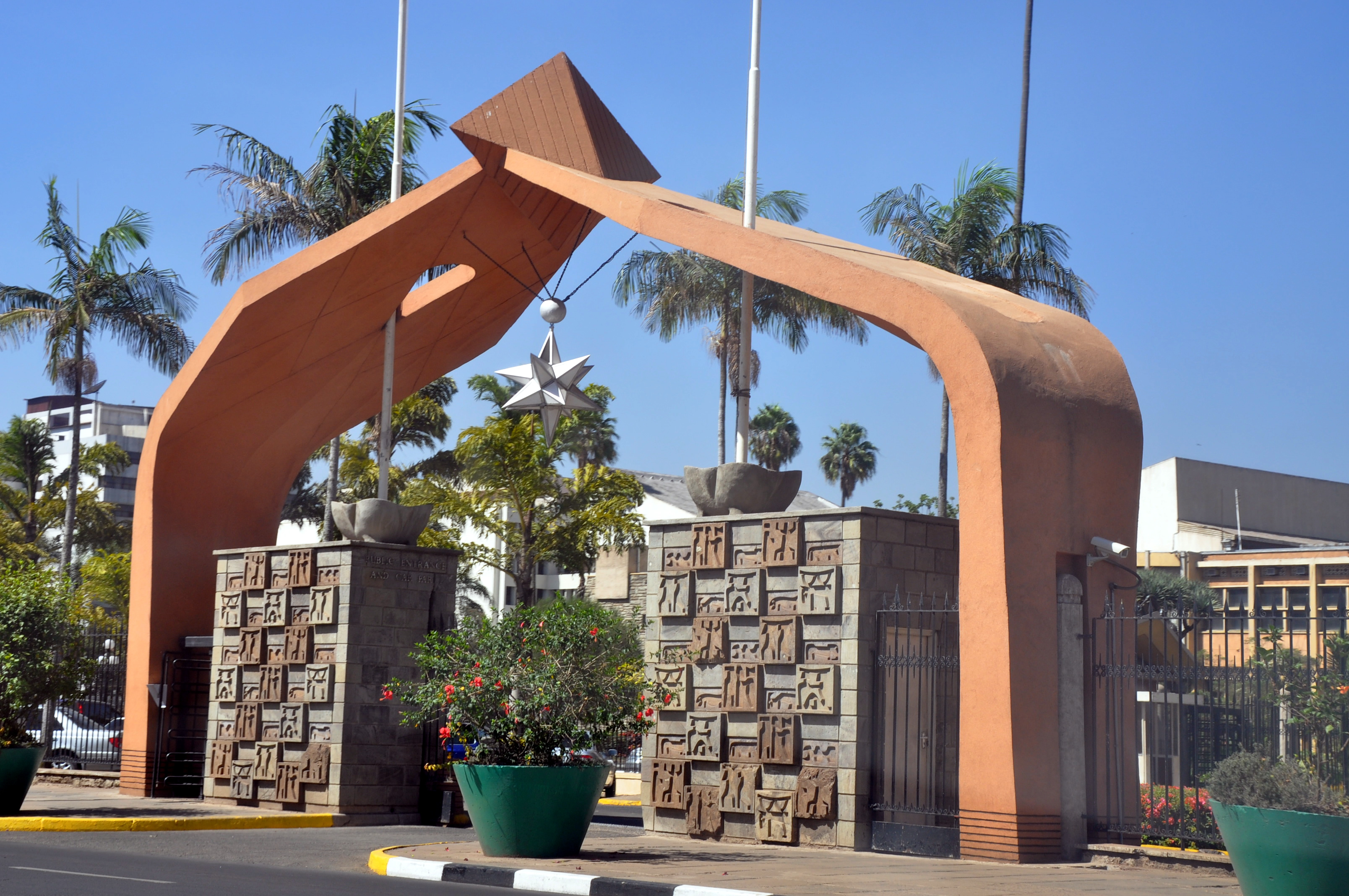
The entrance to the parliament

The buildings were constructed in 1954 and became the home of the colonial legislature of the Kenya Colony, the Legislative Council of Kenya, which sat there until 1963, when the council was replaced by the National Assembly. The buildings, known before 1963 as the "Legislative Buildings", were designed by prominent modernist architect, Amyas Connell, and the town planning advisor to the Kenyan Colonial Government, Harold Thornley Dyer. The Parliament has an English-style clocktower which was a design requirement to have the Legislative Buildings echo the Palace of Westminster and Big Ben.

During the Kenya Finance Bill protests on 25 June 2024, the parliament was stormed. Several rooms were ransacked while parts of the building were set on fire. The ceremonial mace used in legislative proceedings was stolen. Ten protesters were shot dead by police with 31 protesters injured and over 280 protesters arrested.

== Burials ==
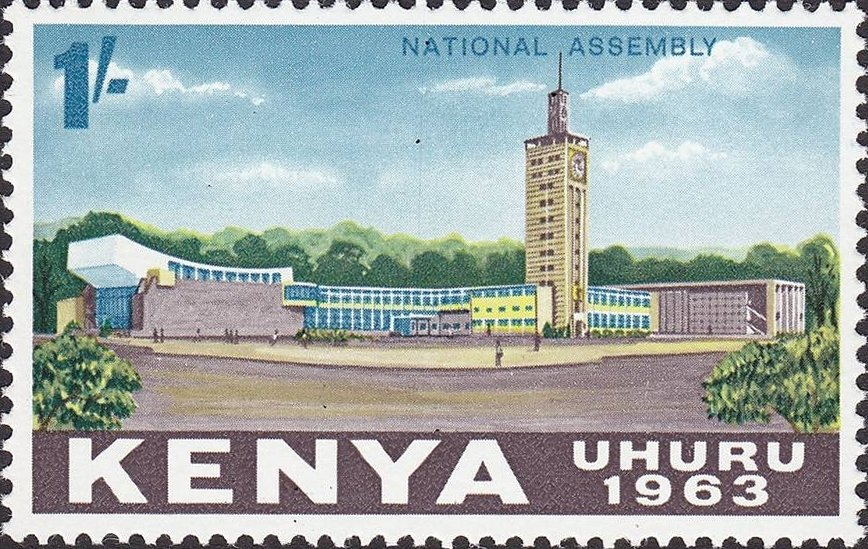
A 1963 stamp, depicting the Parliament

Jomo Kenyatta, Kenya's first prime minister and president, is buried on the estate.
