= Boniface Mwangi =

Kenyan activist, photojournalist

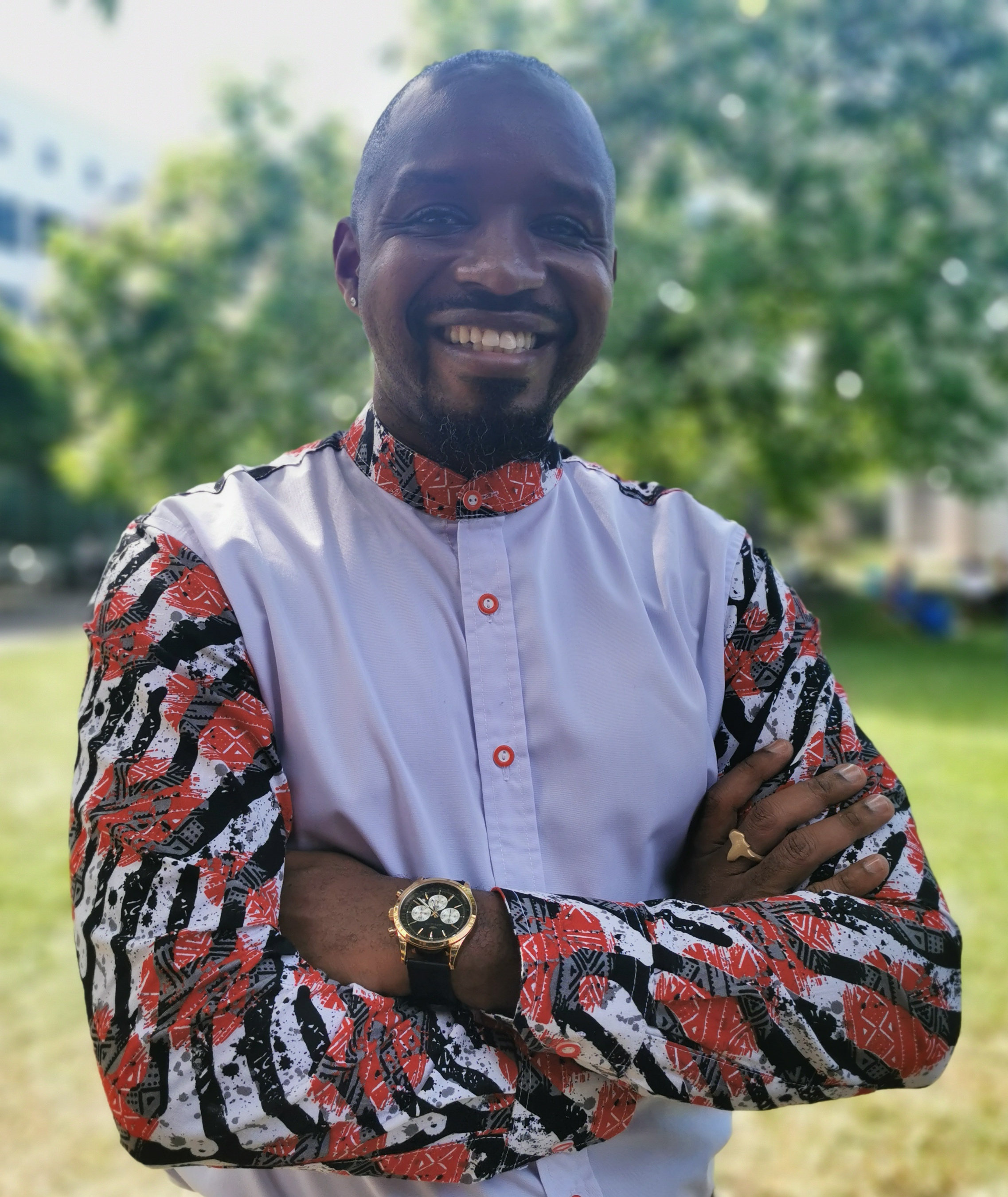
- Boniface Mwangi (2026) at the Deutsche Welle Global Media Forum in Bonn (Germany)
- Born: 10 July 1983 (age 43); Taveta, Kenya
- Citizenship: Kenya
- Education: Human Rights & Documentary Photography; Dip in print Journalism; Dip in Bible Studies
- Alma mater: New York University; East African School of Journalism; The Kingdom Academy
- Occupations: Activist; Photojournalist; Politician
- Years active: 2004 - present
- Spouse: Hellen Njeri Mwangi (m. 2008)
- Children: Nalia Sifa; Nate Simphiwe; Jabali Mboya
- Awards: The Future Awards Africa Prize for Advocacy & Activism; CNN Africa Photojournalist of the Year
- Website: bonifacemwangi.com

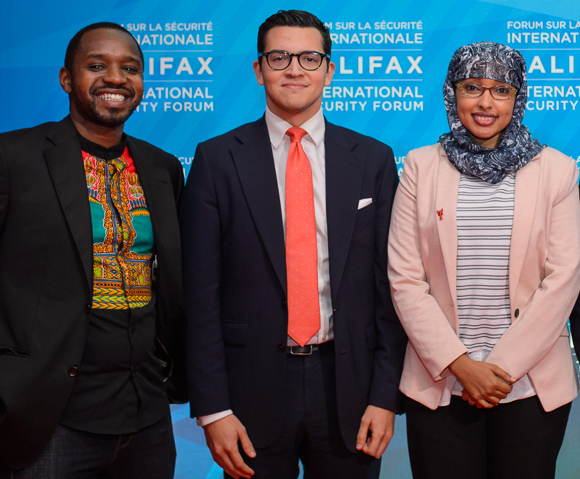
Mwangi (left) at the 2017 Halifax International Security Forum

Boniface Mwangi (born July 10, 1983) is a Kenyan photojournalist, politician and activist involved in social-political activism. He is known for his images of the post-election violence that hit Kenya in 2007 and 2008.

== Early life and education ==
Mwangi was born on July 10, 1983, in Taveta, Kenya, at the Tanzanian border. His mother, Wakiuru wa Mahinge was a businesswoman who traded across the Kenya - Tanzania border. Mwangi started living with his grandparents in Nyeri, Central Kenya, when he was six.

He later moved in with his mother in Nairobi's low-income suburb of Ngara in 1986, then a high-rise in Majengo, Githurai 45, before finally settling in Pangani. Mwangi dropped in and out of school during this period and helped his mother vend books.

=== Education ===
Mwangi attended Maganjo primary school in Nyeri and later moved to Pangani primary school where he completed his Kenya Certificate of Primary Education. He was sent by a probation officer to Getathuru approved school and later transferred to Othaya approved school where he led a strike. He was later admitted at the Kabete approved school where he got expelled in 1998 not completing his Kenya Certificate of Secondary Education. In 2016, he completed his secondary education as a private candidate.

He did a diploma in Bible studies in 2003 from The Kingdom Academy then proceeded with another diploma in Print Journalism from the East African School of Journalism. In 2011 he did a program on Human Rights and Documentary Photography with New York University.

== Career ==
=== Journalism ===
When his mother died in 2000, Mwangi, then 17, decided he had to change if he was to survive. He joined a Bible school with the intention of becoming a pastor, and secured a diploma in biblical studies. Whilst at school he became interested in photography. He was influenced by the Kenyan photographer Mohamed Amin. Despite not having a high school education, Mwangi managed to gain a place at a private journalism school. To fund his studies he had to continue selling books on the street, but soon began to gain experience as a photojournalist. He published photographs in the national newspaper The Standard, and in 2005 won his first photography prizes. Within three years he received international recognition as one of Africa's most promising photographers. He was awarded the 2008 and 2010 CNN Africa Photojournalist of the Year Award.

=== Activism ===
Mwangi quit journalism after witnessing and documenting post-election violence in Kenya in 2007 as a newspaper photographer. He experienced posttraumatic stress and depression (and he was also directly affected having to move temporarily after people of his community were being threatened).

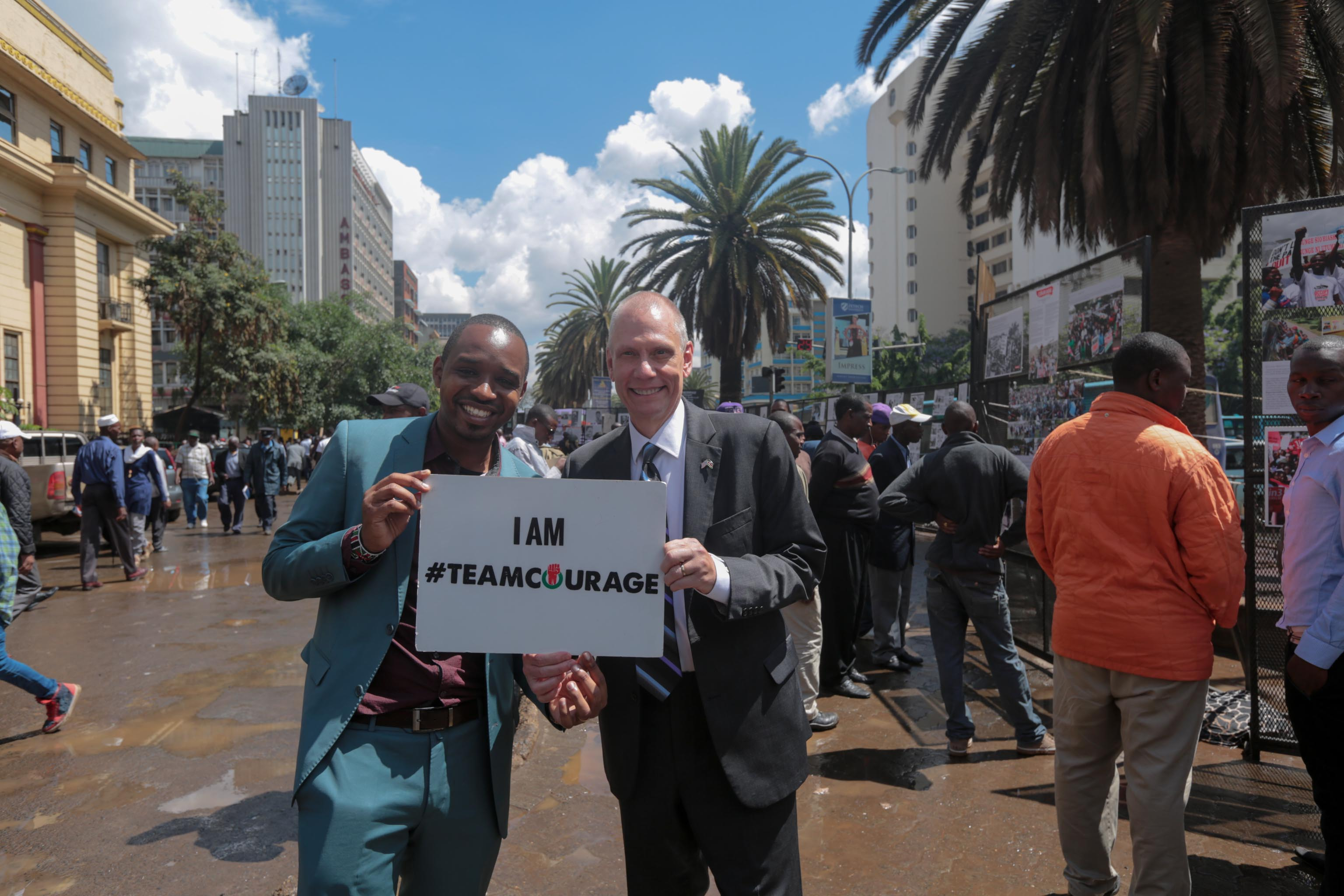
TeamCourage public exhibition

His first initiative was the project Picha Mtaani, Swahili for "photos in the street", showing photographs of the violence in 2007 after the national elections, between the different tribes. This traveling street exhibition was shown around the country for people to discuss reconciliation and promote national healing. Over 600,000 people saw the exhibition. This was later complemented by the documentary Heal the Nation, which was shown mostly in slum areas.

Following these initiatives Mwangi started to develop a stronger human rights stance in his work on fighting (political and corporate) impunity, speaking out against bad and corrupt political leadership, and promoting a message of peace for the elections planned for 2013 with initiatives called MaVulture and Team Courage. Team Courage is a Nairobi-based lobby that strives to enable a patriotic citizens' movement to take bold and effective actions in building a new Kenya. His latest initiative is Pawa 254 which was launched in 2011, a hub and space for artists and activists to work together towards social change and advancing Human rights in Kenya.

In June 2024 he alongside Hanifa, Hussen Khalid were detained by the police after having been summoned by the DCI to the headquarters for their role in the Finance Bill protests, a move that had them arrested and detained. Former chief justice Willy Mutunga presented himself alongside others at the DCI headquarters to complain about the illegal arrest of demonstrators in the Anti-finance bill protests. Mutunga denied claims that he had gotten arrested at the incident. They were later released after the ODPP refused to charge them .

In May 2025, Mwangi and activist Agather Atuhaire were detained in Tanzania after they went to attend a trial of Tanzanian opposition leader Tundu Lisu who was on trial, being charged for treason. They were released days later, after which they alleged to have been tortured and sexually assaulted in the hands of the police. They filed a case at the East African Court of Justice over the injustices they were subjected to.

In July 2025, the police arrested Boniface Mwangi and searched his office. According to the Directorate of Criminal Investigations (DCI), the "occupants" of Mwangi's office "distributed money to facilitate the hiring of thugs".

=== Politics ===
He formed Ukweli Party and was a candidate for the Starehe Constituency member of Parliament seat in the 2017 Kenyan general election. In August 2025, he announced his candidacy for president in the 2027 Kenyan general election.

== Controversy ==
=== Pig protest over MPs pay ===
On May 15, 2013, Mwangi was one of the protest organizers which saw spilled animal blood and dozens of pigs with messages written in blood that said 'MPs' were released at one of the outside Kenya's Parliament. This was a protest by various civil activists including Okiya Omtata over the MPs attempting to overturn a ruling that had reduced their salaries. Mwangi and a dozen of other protestors were detained.

=== Protest over playground ===
On January 19, 2015, he participated in a demonstration against the removal of a playground with teachers and students from Lang'ata Road Primary which had been acquired by a private developer. He organized former students and a couple of civil rights activists to join the protests.

=== Fabricating Allegations & Witness Coaching ===
In October 2016, Mwangi linked president William Ruto to the assassination of a murdered Jubilee government critic Jacob Juma and that Ruto also wanted him dead as well. In the same month Ruto sued Mwangi for defamation. In December 2016, Mwangi was accused of fabricating allegations against Ruto including coaching a witness to lie about allegations about Juma's murder, in court and to the Kenyan media. In the same month it was reported by Daily Nation that a person from Ruto's office delivered a letter to Mwangi to help him with his defamation case. That person later recanted his statements and claimed Mwangi coached him to fabricate stories about his claims on Juma's murder yet Mwangi had nothing provable about any of his claims but had just concocted non-existent and non-provable allegations about the murder.

== Legal issues ==
=== Arrest over city hall demonstrations ===
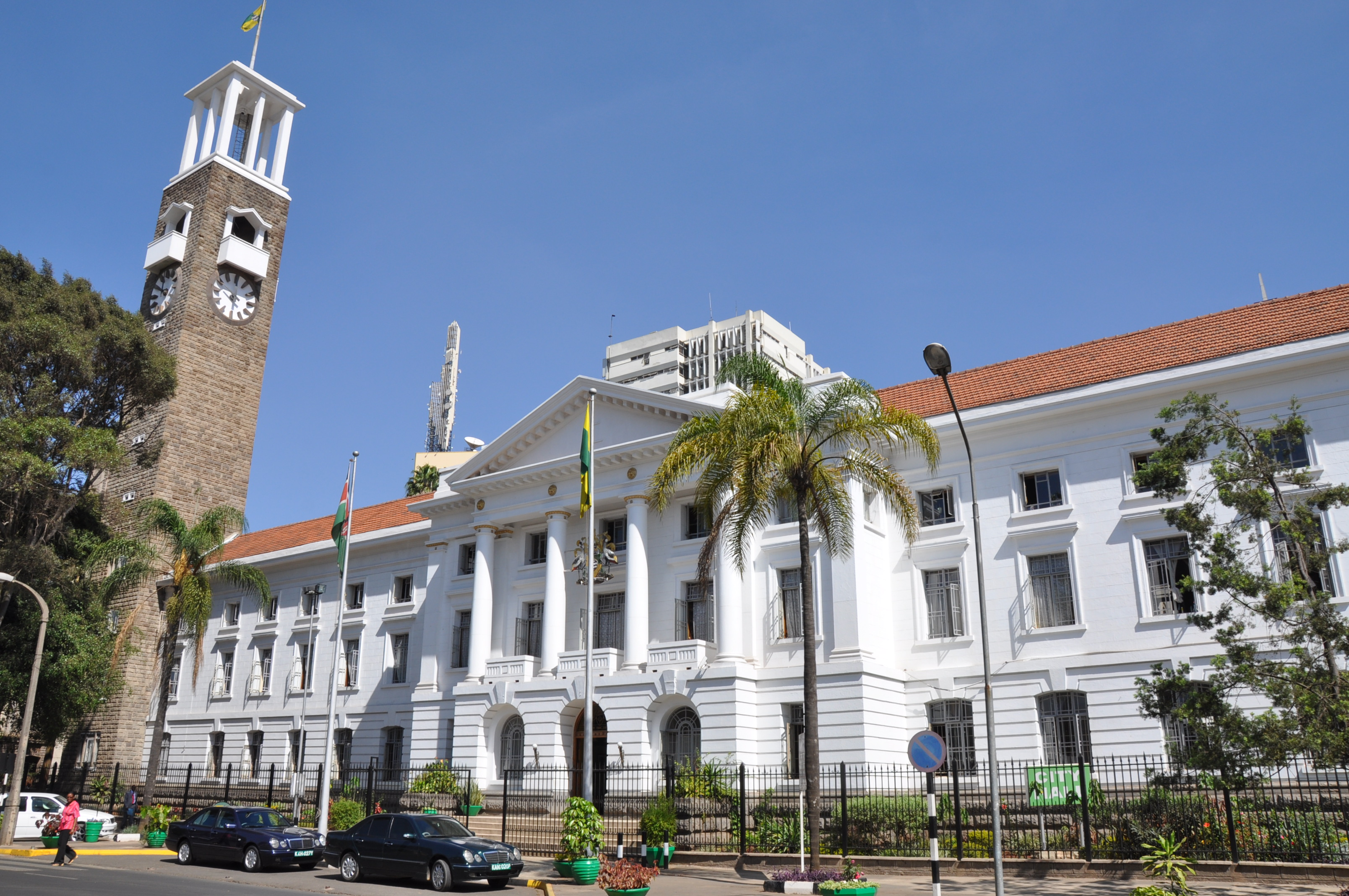
Nairobi City Hall

On July 1, 2015, he was filming a protest by boda boda operators against alleged harassment by the Nairobi City Council officers popularly known as Kanjo. Mwangi was arrested by Administration police guarding city hall and taken to central police station for questioning. He was released on a KSh 50,000 police bond and appeared in court on July 13, 2015, where he was charged with obstruction.

=== Knock out corruption march ===
On December 1, 2015, Mwangi organized a march to State House, Nairobi, alongside 25 other activists. They were later arrested and detained at Kilimani and Central police stations. Police stated that the activists had not submitted a notification letter to the Officer Commanding Station (OCS) three days before the march, as required by law, despite the group having written one dated November 27 to the Inspector General of Police.

=== Arrest on suspicion of organizing a revolution ===
Mwangi was arrested by police on May 6, 2019, for allegedly organizing a revolution in Kenya. He was picked from his house by detectives and taken to Central police station. Mwangi was a person of interest in an alleged plot to stage a revolution against former President Uhuru Kenyatta's government.

== Personal life ==
He married Hellen Njeri Mwangi on May 8, 2008, at the Nairobi Sailing Club, whom he works with at Pawa 254. They have three children.

== Honours and awards ==
- Time: Next Generation Leaders 2015
- Mwangi was cited as one of the Top 100 most influential Africans by New African magazine in 2020.

== See also ==
- 2007 Kenya general elections
- Hanifa Adan
- Politics in Kenya
- Willy Mutunga
