= Faith Odhiambo =

President of Law Society of Kenya since 2024

President, Law Society of Kenya
- In office 2024–2026
- Preceded by: Eric Theuri
- Succeeded by: Charles Kanjama

Personal details
- Born: 1986 (age 39–40)

Faith Odhiambo (born 1986) is a Kenyan lawyer, advocate and 51st president of the Law Society of Kenya (LSK). She is the second female LSK president after Raychelle Omamo. She served as the vice president of LSK until 2024, when she was elected president. Odhiambo is from the Luo Community.

== Early life and education ==
Faith Odhiambo pursued her Bachelor of Laws (LLB) degree at the Catholic University of Eastern Africa. She later on proceeded further with her studies by obtaining a Diploma in Law from the Kenya School of Law and became an advocate at High Court. She went on to pursue and attained an LLM (Hons) in International Commercial Law with European Law from the University of Kent. Odhiambo is a PhD student at the University of Nairobi. She focuses on legalities to do with competition law, consumer protection law, telecommunications law, banking law, financial services, arbitration and alternative dispute resolution.

== Career ==
She was elected to lead the LSK for a two-year term, taking over from Eric Theuri. She is the board secretary of the Federation of Women Lawyers-Kenya (FIDA-Kenya) and also a partner at Ombok and Owuor Advocates and a consulting partner at MMA Advocates. Odhiambo is also a lecturer at the University of Nairobi where she teaches Law. In 2017, she was involved in a Retail Market Study of Kenya, Advisory Projects for Competition in the Mobile financial services in Tanzania, as well as the Advisory projects on Spectrum Management in Kenya.

=== 2024 Anti-finance bill demonstrations ===
Odhiambo was at the helm of legal matters during the Kenya Finance Bill demos. She provided legal representation in courts for victims of police brutality and for those arraigned in court after being arrested during the protests. She was also at the forefront in calling out the government to clarify on the state of missing persons during the protests, as it was alleged that some had been abducted in connection to their involvement in the Anti-tax demos. She secured the release of many. Her relentless commitment to justice earned her the title “The People’s Chief Justice” by the public.

In August 2025, she was appointed by William Ruto as the vice chair of the Compensation Panel, led by Makau Mutua, which had been formed to lead the compensation exercise of victims of demonstrations and public protests. She later quit the role in October and was replaced by Claris Awuor Oghanga.

== Personal life ==
Odhiambo is married. Her personal life is off the public.

== See also ==
- Dorcas Oduor
- Law Society of Kenya
- Martha Koome
