= Hanifa Adan =

Kenyan activist and social media inluencer

Hanifa Adan Farsafi
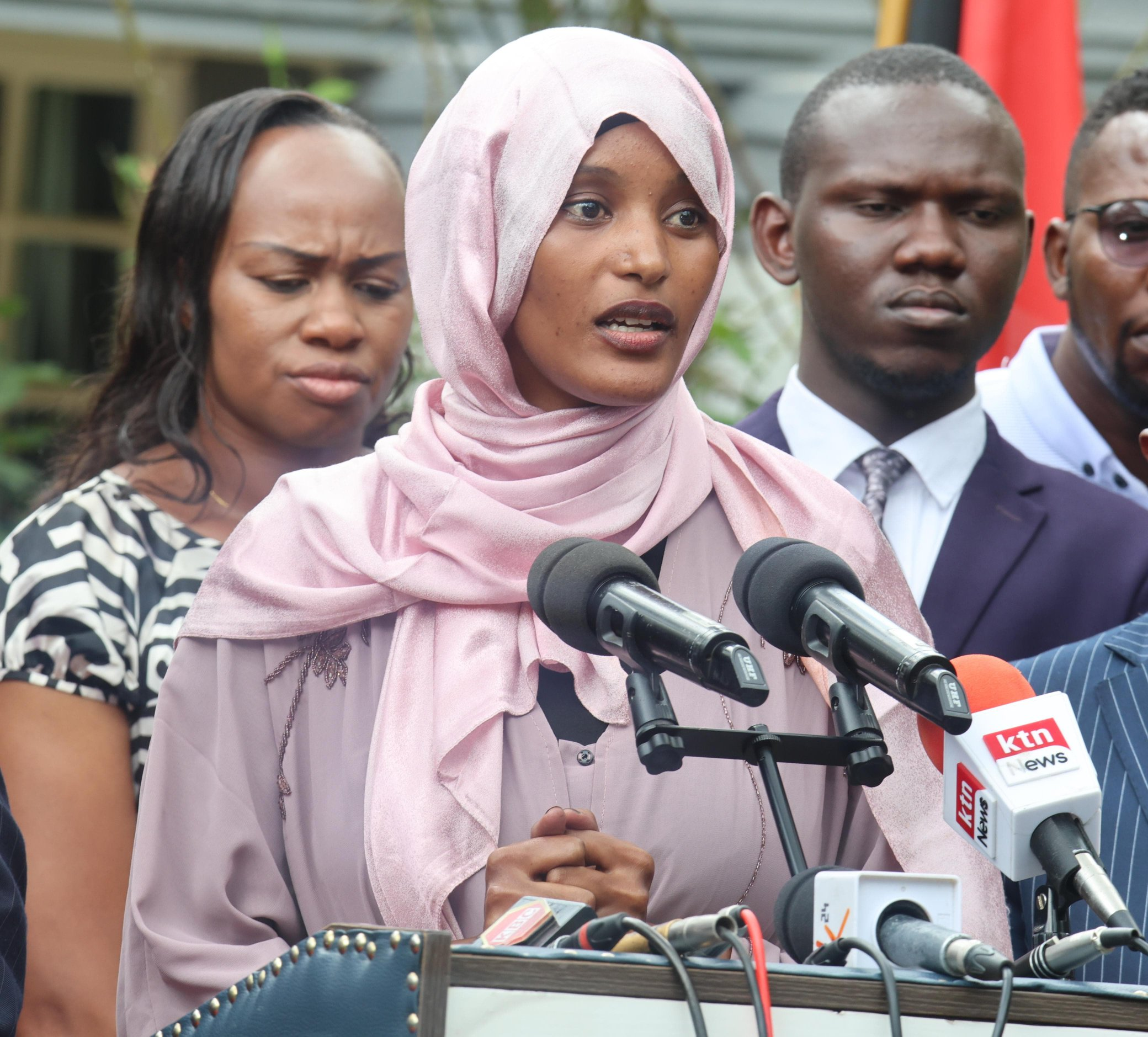
- Born: 1996 (age 29–30); Korogocho, Nairobi, Kenya
- Occupations: Activist and social media influencer

X information
- Handle: @Honeyfarsafi
- Display name: Hanifa

Hanifa Adan Farsafi (born 1996, Korogocho, Nairobi) is a Kenyan activist and social media influencer. She became a well-known activist in 2022, when she repeatedly called out the Nairobi county government over a drainage problem that had been neglected for three decades in the Korogocho slums in Nairobi. She garnered support from netizens and together they had the problem fixed by the county.

She was involved in the youth-led protests against the finance bill in 2024.

== Activism ==
Adan's activism began in 2022, when she called out the neglected drainage problem in Korogocho, a slum neighborhood in Nairobi. She posted about the issue on her Twitter account, and her amplificaction of the message led to county governor Johnson Sakaja fixing the issue. This put her activism career in the public limelight.

In 2023, she turned to Mandera County, calling out its leaders for their corruption and criminal malfeasance. She later stopped her posting, citing coercion and intimidation. She took part in the Kenya Finance Bill protests in 2024, and was a critic of the finance bill on social media . She managed an online fundraising campaign to raise funds to cater for the treatment, rehabilitation and domestic support of those who were injured in the demonstrations and burial expenses for killed protesters.

In May 2025, she was detained in Tanzania while attending Tundu Lissu's treason trial, alongside activists Hussein Khalid and former Chief Justice Willy Mutunga.

She advocates for youth leadership and inclusion of youth in key sectors of the economy and job market, a move which has seen her clash with veteran leaders on the same including an online exchange with COTU boss Francis Atwoli.

She sits on the exploratory committee of Okiya Omtata who declared interest in vying for presidency in 2027. She was appointed to the committee in November 2024 by Omtata. In August 2025, she expressed interest in running for Nairobi woman representative seat in the 2027 general elections.

She is also involved in empowerment programs for girls and runs the Girls First Initiative, a project aimed at improving educational opportunities for girls in remote areas.

== Personal life and education ==
Adan was born in 1996 in Korogocho, Nairobi, Kenya.

She maintains close ties with her family, with whom she stays with. She is unmarried. She holds a degree in Journalism and Mass Communication and as of 2024, was pursuing a Master's degree in the same course.

== Awards and recognitions ==
- Kenya Women Leader of the Year award 2024
- African Gender Equality Forum
- Human Rights Defender of the Year Award, 2024

== See also ==
- Agather Atuhaire
- Boniface Mwangi
- Feminism in Kenya
- Judy Thongori
- Kasmuel McOure
- Maverick Aoko
