= Politics of Kenya =

The politics of Kenya take place in a framework of a presidential republic, whereby the president is both head of state and head of government, and of a multi-party system in accordance with the 2010 constitution.

Executive power is exercised by the executive branch of government, headed by the President, who chairs the cabinet, which is composed of people chosen from outside parliament. Legislative power is vested exclusively in Parliament. The judiciary is independent of the executive and the legislature. In Kenyan politics, the executive wields considerable power and other institutions have limited means of checking that power.

Historically governed as a one-party state under the Kenya African National Union (KANU), Kenya's transition to multiparty politics occurred over the period 1992-2002.

The Economist Intelligence Unit rated Kenya a "hybrid regime" in 2022. The Political terror scale gave the country a rating of 4, meaning that civil and political rights violations had expanded to large numbers of the population. Murders, disappearances, and torture were common parts of life.

== Executive branch ==
Main office-holders
Office	Name	Party	Since
President	William Ruto	United Democratic Alliance	13 September 2022
Deputy President	Kithure Kindiki	United Democratic Alliance	1 November 2024

The president is elected for a five-year term by the people. As of the 2013 March general election, the Constitution of Kenya has two requirements for any candidate to be declared winner:

- to win at least 25% of the vote in a majority of Kenya's forty-seven counties
- to garner 50% + 1 vote of the total valid votes.

If none of the candidates fulfills these requirements there is to be a runoff between the two contenders with the highest number of votes. The Deputy President is the running mate of the candidate that wins the presidential election whilst other cabinet members will be appointed, with the approval from the National Assembly, from outside Parliament.

Between 2008 and 2013 Kenya was governed by a Grand coalition, established by a power-sharing agreement, signed by then President Mwai Kibaki and Prime Minister Raila Odinga of the Orange Democratic Movement. That government was semi-presidential in form, with the executive headed by a president and a prime minister, and ministers were appointed to reflect political parties' relative strength in Kenya's 10th Parliament in which Raila Odinga's party, the Orange Democratic Movement was the largest party. Under the power-sharing agreement, each of the two major parties also nominated a deputy prime minister. The post of the Prime Minister was abolished after 2013, returning Kenya to a presidential system of government.

== Legislative branch ==
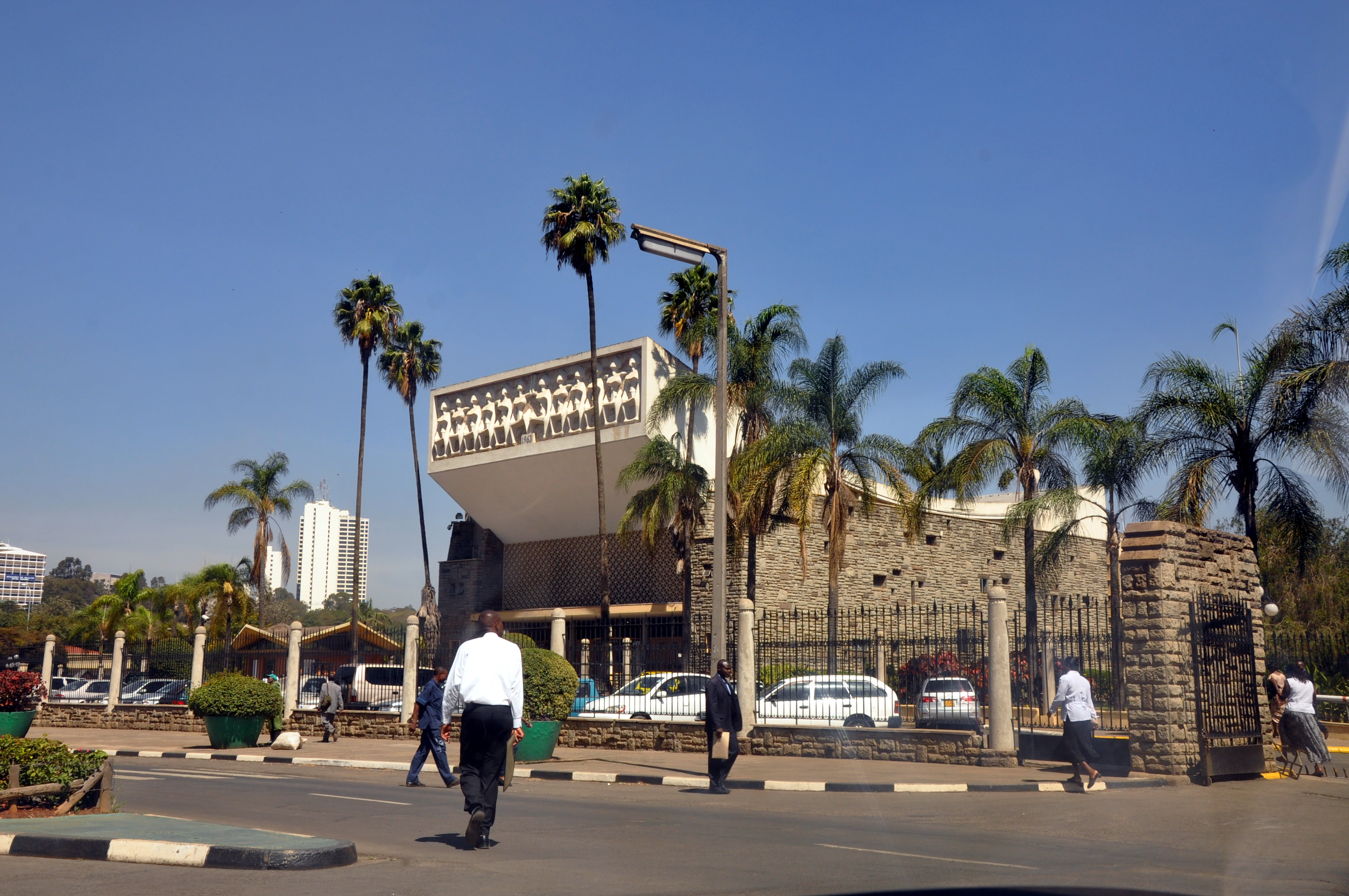
The National Assembly of Kenya is based at Parliament Buildings in Nairobi.

The Bicameral Parliament consists of two 'houses'; the National Assembly and the Senate.

The National Assembly, or Bunge, has 349 members. They include: 290 members elected each elected by registered voters in their respective constituencies for a five-year term, 47 women representatives elected from each county, 12 members nominated by political parties in proportion to their share of seats won in the single-member constituencies, and the speaker, who is an ex officio member.

The Senate consists of 67 members: 47 members elected by registered voters from the 47 counties; 16 women nominated by political parties; a man and a woman representing youths and a man and woman representing people with disabilities. The speaker is an ex-officio member.

== Judicial branch ==
The Kenyan judiciary is divided into superior courts and subordinate courts. The judiciary is headed by the chief justice, who is also the president of the Supreme Court. Superior courts consist of the Supreme Court, the Court of Appeal and the High Court. Supreme Court judges, High Court judges, and judges of the Court of Appeal (no associate judges) are appointed by an independent Judicial Service Commission. The chief justice and his or her deputy are nominated by the president from names selected by the Judicial Service Commission and voted on by the National Assembly. Subordinate courts are magistrates' courts, Kadhi courts and courts-martial. The current chief justice is Martha Koome. The tribunals are bodies which are established by Acts of Parliament to exercise judicial or quasi-judicial functions. Tthese supplement ordinary courts in the administration of justice, but do not have penal jurisdiction.

== Administrative divisions ==
Under the 2010 Constitution, Kenya is divided into 47 counties (including the Cities of Nairobi and Mombasa), each comprising a whole number of Parliamentary constituencies. Each county has an elected Assembly, whose members are elected from single-member wards.

There are provisions for additional assembly members to be appointed to improve the gender balance and to represent special groups such as persons with disabilities and youth. Each county is administered by an elected county governor and deputy governor, backed by an executive committee

== Political conditions ==
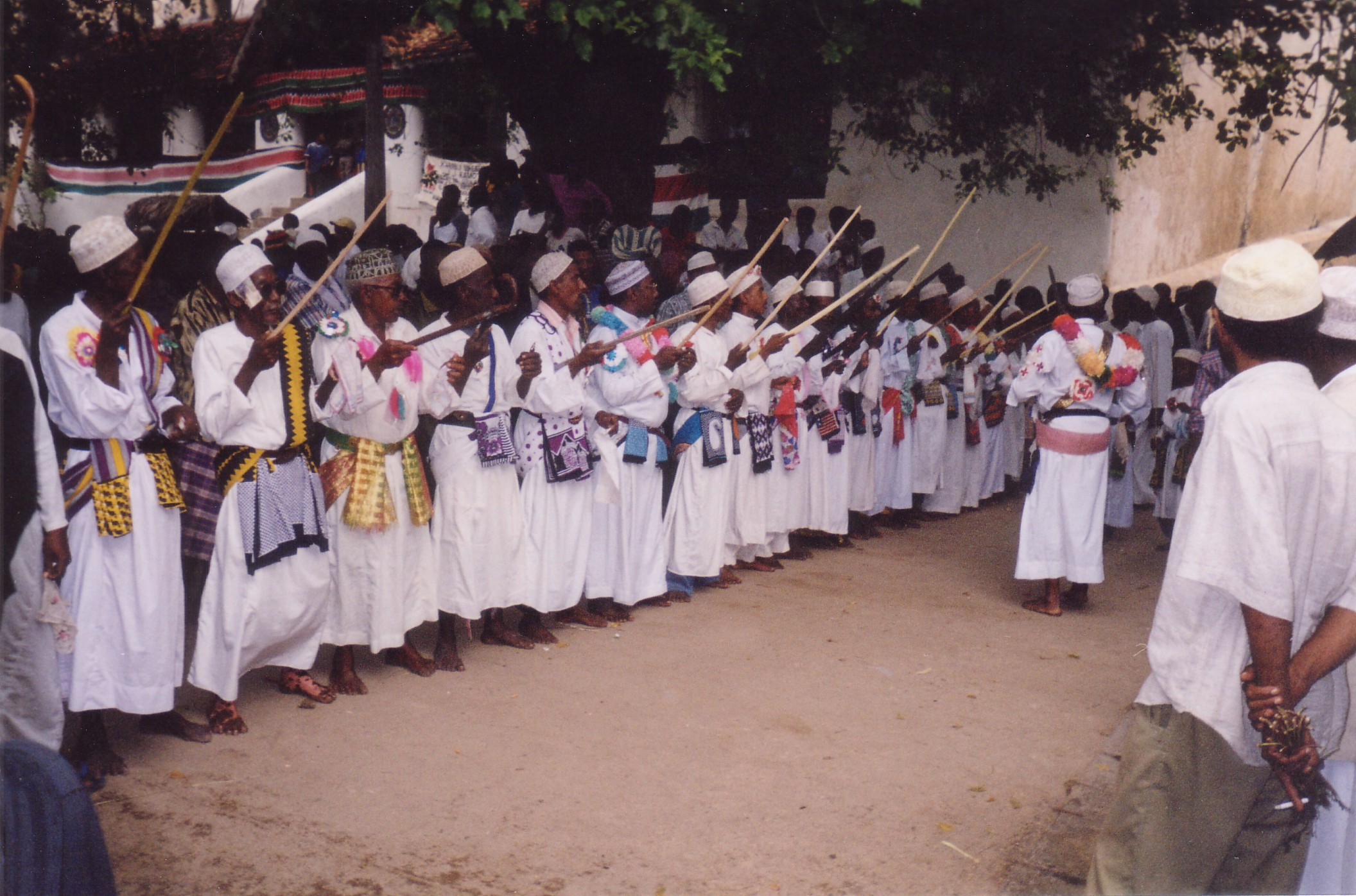
A political parade in Lamu, held in July 2001

Since independence in 1963, Kenya has maintained remarkable stability, despite changes in its political system and crises in neighboring countries. Particularly since the re-emergence of multiparty democracy, Kenyans have enjoyed an increased degree of freedom. A cross-party parliamentary reform initiative in the fall of 1997 revised some oppressive laws inherited from the colonial era that had been used to limit freedom of speech and assembly. This improved public freedoms and contributed to generally credible national elections in December 1997.

In December 2002, Kenya held democratic and open elections and elected Mwai Kibaki as their new president. The elections, which were judged free and fair by local and international observers, marked an important turning point in Kenya's democratic evolution. President Kibaki campaigned on a policy of generating economic growth, improving education, combating corruption, and implementing a new constitution, the draft of which was produced by Professor Ghai under the Moi regime. Considerable success has been achieved in the first two policy areas, the constitutional process had become mired (see below) and the fight against corruption has been a disaster.

There have been major scandals (including Anglo-Leasing), which the government has failed to investigate. John Githongo, then Permanent Secretary to the President on Ethics and Governance, resigned in protest, and donor nations, in particular the British, have made public criticisms of the lack of progress. Following disagreements between the partners in the then-government coalition, constitutional reform proceeded slower than anticipated. The NAK faction (allied to President Kibaki) favored a centralized presidential system, while the LDP faction—which had fewer parliamentary seats in that coalition than NAK—demanded a federal, parliamentary system, referred to in some circles as Majimbo.

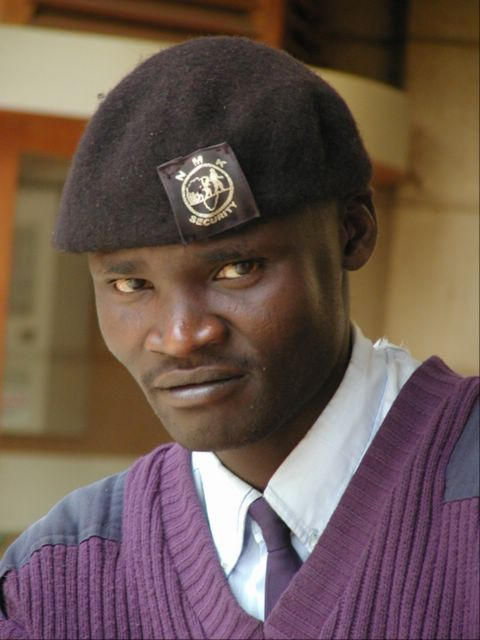
A Kenyan private security officer

Prior to the 2002 election, a memorandum of understanding (MoU) was agreed between NAK and LDP, which laid the basis for the two groups to contest the election under the NARC (Rainbow Alliance) banner. The MoU agreed that a new constitution would be established shortly after the election, which provided for the new role of a strong prime minister while weakening the role of the president. Raila Odinga, then leader of LDP, maintained aspirations to become prime minister. However, that draft constitution was modified by the government from what was written by Professor Ghai and amended by the Bomas committee.

This maintained a strong president, who controls a weaker prime minister. This led to a split between NAK and LDP, with the former campaigning for a 'Yes' vote in a 2005 referendum on the constitution and the latter a 'No'. Also supporting a 'No' vote was the majority of Uhuru Kenyatta's KANU party, the sole party of government from independence to 2002. The outcome of that referendum, in which the draft constitution was rejected, signalled a wider re-alignment before the 2007 elections, in which the No team reorganised itself as the Orange Democratic Movement with Raila Odinga as their presidential flag bearer whilst those in the Yes team ended up in several political parties including the Party of National Unity.

Internal wrangling within that governing coalition also negatively affected other crucial areas of governance, notably the planned large-scale privatisation of government-owned enterprises. The 2007 presidential elections were largely believed to have been flawed with international observers stating that they did not meet regional or international standards. Most observers suggest that the tallying process for the presidential results was rigged to the advantage of the incumbent president, Mwai Kibaki, despite overwhelming indications that his rival and the subsequent Prime Minister of Kenya, Raila Odinga, won the election. In July 2008, exit polls commissioned by the US government were released, revealing that Odinga had won the election by a comfortable margin of 6%, well outside of the poll's 1.3% margin of error.

There was significant and widespread violence in Kenya—the 2007–2008 Kenyan crisis—following the unprecedented announcement of Kibaki as the winner of the 2007 presidential elections. The violence led to the death of almost 1,000 people and the displacement of almost 600,000 people. Some researchers note it allowed the violent settlement of land disputes between ethnic groups over controversial concepts of 'ancestral homelands'.

A diplomatic solution was achieved, as the two rivals were later united in a grand coalition government following international mediation, led by former UN Secretary-General Kofi Annan, under a power-sharing National Accord on Reconciliation Act, entrenched in the constitution. Following the agreement, power was shared between President Mwai Kibaki and prime minister, Raila Odinga.

Several steps were recommended to ensure stability and peace for the Nation during the negotiations that led to the formation of the Coalition government. One of these reforms was the famous Agenda 4 which deals with reforms in various sectors. A new constitution was identified as a key area in fulfilling Agenda 4. A draft constitution was published and Kenyans adopted it in a vote on 4 August 2010.

In 2013 the coalition government was rendered ineffective due to the constitution. General elections were held and the Jubilee coalition with president, Uhuru Kenyatta and Deputy President, William Samoei Ruto clinched victory. The new constitution also provided for a bicameral house, the Senate and the National Assembly. These were duly filled up with elected candidates. The nation was also divided into counties headed by governors and represented in the Senate by senators. Women in these counties were also represented by electing women Representatives. The five-year term ended on 2017 and the country went in for the elections. The President Uhuru Kenyatta and Deputy William Samoei Ruto were re-elected on 30 October 2017. This will run up to 2022 when the next elections will be conducted. The historical handshake in March 2018 between President Uhuru Kenyatta and his long-time opponent Raila Odinga meant reconciliation followed by economic growth and increased stability. William Ruto was declared the winner of the 2022 Kenyan general election On 13 September 2022, William Ruto was sworn in as Kenya's fifth president.

In July 2024, after weeks of anti-government protests, president Ruto dissolved the Cabinet, firing every cabinet secretary and the attorney general, with the exception of Prime Cabinet Secretary Musalia Mudavadi. The office of the deputy president was not affected.
