= Death of Albert Ojwang =

Kenyan blogger and teacher

Albert Ojwang
- Born: Albert Omondi Ojwang; 7 July 1994; Kakoth village, Homa Bay District, Kenya
- Died: 7 June 2025 (aged 30); Nairobi, Kenya
- Education: Pwani University
- Occupation: Teacher
- Spouse: Nevinina Onyango
- Children: 1

On the night of 7 June 2025, 30-year-old Albert Omondi Ojwang (born 7 July 1994), a Kenyan teacher and blogger known for his outspoken commentary on social and political issues, died in police detention in Nairobi. Police initially contended that Ojwang, who was arrested for allegedly defaming the Deputy Inspector General of Police in Kenya, died of alleged self-inflicted injuries. Nevertheless, an autopsy conducted on 10 June 2025 pointed to Ojwang having died of physical assault.

Ojwang's death resulted in protests and outrage by both Kenyan political figures and the wider public.

== Background ==
Ojwang, an ethnic Luo, attended Pwani University and worked as teacher in the town of Mwatate in southeastern Kenya. Ojwang gained recognition for his posts on X (formerly Twitter), where he frequently discussed governance and public affairs under a pseudonym. In April 2025, Ojwang had returned to his childhood home in Kakoth, near Homa Bay, to formalize his marriage with his wife Nevnina Onyango. At the time of his death, Ojwang was the father of a three-year-old boy, George.

== Arrest and detention ==
On 7 June 2025, Ojwang was arrested at home in Kakoth and transferred 350 km (220 mi) away to Nairobi’s Central Police Station, following allegations of publishing false information about Deputy Inspector General of Police Eliud Lagat on X. On 8 June he was found unconscious in his cell and later pronounced dead at Mbagathi Hospital.

An autopsy conducted on 10 June 2025, revealed that he had suffered severe head injuries, neck compression, and multiple soft tissue trauma, contradicting initial police claims that he had inflicted the injuries himself.

The case remains under investigation, with the Independent Policing Oversight Authority (IPOA) leading inquiries. As of 12 June, six police officers are under investigation, with one being arrested.

== Reactions ==
Ojwang's death sparked national outrage, with human rights groups and political figures demanding accountability. The U.S. Embassy also called for a transparent investigation into the circumstances surrounding his death.

Justin Muturi, former speaker of the National Assembly of Kenya, wrote in the Daily Nation that Ojwang was "killed by the state", contending that his death was the result of a "broken, brutal police culture" and demanded the officers be prosecuted and that President Ruto take full responsibility.

Raila Odinga, former prime minister of Kenya, condemned the killing on X and called for the Kenya Police to take responsibility.

Protests began in Nairobi on 9 June and continued in the following days. On 12 June, police deployed tear gas against protesters. Deputy Inspector General of Police Eliud Lagat, who Ojwang was arrested for allegedly defaming, stepped aside on 16 June 2025.

== Aftermath ==
The officer in charge of station (OCS) Samson Talaam alongside other five suspects most of them being officers at the station were charged for murder over Ojwang's death. Talaam was in charge of the police station at the time Ojwang was detained, though defended himself ,saying he was not present when Ojwang was brought in after arrest. They all pleaded not guilty and were denied a release on bail. The case is still active in court pending a final ruling.

== Trial ==
The trial began on 20 July 2026. Presumably deleted Closed-circuit television (CCTV) footage was used in the first day to identify key parts of the police station. It had been deleted and the Digital Video Recorder (DVR) formatted to allegedly cover up Ojwang's murder and protect those who killed him, the footage was recovered by IPOA. Former Nairobi Central Police Station OCS Samson Talaam, Police Constable Peter Kimani, Police Constable James Mukhwana, and three civilians are all charged with the murder of Albert Omondi Ojwang.
