= Political terror scale =

State inflicted political terror

The Political Terror Scale is a yearly measure of state-inflicted political terror. It was developed in the early 1980s by researchers at Purdue University and is currently managed by Mark Gibney of the University of North Carolina at Asheville.

Originally, only 59 countries were coded for within the database between 1976 and 1983. In 1984, Mark Gibney took over as manager of the database and expanded the list of countries coded to 180 and the range of years to the most recent years available (currently 2012).

The Political Terror Scale uses three sources to code each country: the United States Department of State's Country Reports on Human Rights Practices, the Annual Report from Amnesty International, and the World Report from Human Rights Watch. The database can be viewed and downloaded from its website.

== Coding process ==
=== Scale ===
The Political Terror Scale is a five-point fixed scale:

1. Countries are under a secure rule of law, people are not imprisoned for their views, and torture is rare or exceptional. Political murders are rare.
2. There is a limited amount of imprisonment for nonviolent political activity. However, a few persons are affected; torture and beating are exceptional. Political murder is rare.
3. There is extensive political imprisonment. Execution or other political murders and brutality may be common. Unlimited detention, with or without trial, for political views is accepted.
4. The practices of Level 3 are expanded to larger numbers. Murders, disappearances, and torture are part of life. In spite of its generality, on this level terror affects primarily those who interest themselves in politics or ideas.
5. The terrors of Level 4 have been extended to the whole population. The leaders of these societies place no limits on the means or thoroughness with which they pursue personal or ideological goals.

The scale is based on the assessment of violence along three dimensions: scope, intensity, and range. Scope is the type of violence carried out by the state, Intensity refers to the frequency at which the state employs a given type of violence, and Range is the portion of the population targeted for abuse (can also be thought of as the selectivity of violence).

=== Coders ===
The principle researchers consist of professors from several universities.

- Mark Gibney - Belk Distinguished Professor of Political Science at the University of North Carolina at Asheville.
- Linda Cornett - Chair and Professor of Political Science at the University of North Carolina at Asheville.
- Reed Wood - Assistant Professor of the School of Politics and Global Studies at Arizona State University.
- Peter Haschke - Assistant Professor of Political Science at the University of North Carolina at Asheville.
- Daniel Arnon - Assistant Professor of the School of Government and Public Policy at The University of Arizona.

Coding is also supplemented by undergraduate and graduate students from several universities. Research assistants for the 2012-2013 year are: Daniel Arnon, Gray Barrett, Minori Hinds, and Kelsey Tavares of the University of North Carolina at Asheville, Alexander Liffiton and Rachel Olson of Arizona State University, Max Scott of the London School of Economics, and Shea Streeter, a recent graduate of the University of Notre Dame.

=== Process ===
The data for each country is analyzed by at least two senior coders and undergraduate assistants. Each nation receives two scores - one from the State Department's report and one from Amnesty International's report. Coders agree with each other regarding a country's score at a rate of roughly 85%. If coders cannot come to an agreement than a third coder will settle the dispute. Due to the contextual nature of the source data, coding is highly subjective, and coders are instructed to ignore their own personal biases or knowledge when determining a country's score. Coders are also instructed to give countries the benefit of any doubt when scoring. If a coder cannot decide between two numbers, they are instructed to use the lower number when scoring.

=== Challenges and examples ===
The Political Terror Scale only measures acts of political terror inflicted by the state. Due to this fact, it may be difficult to score countries when it is not immediately clear which groups are committing acts of violence. Colombia is a perfect example of this dilemma, as although overall violence has decreased since 2000, violence from local militias and paramilitary groups has continued at a relatively stable rate. Although the government has attempted to mitigate the violence, certain actors within the government have either allowed the violence to continue or contributed to it in some way. Therefore, Colombia's score reflects the close level of involvement between government and private actors.

Another challenge is that the Political Terror Scale only measures actual violations of physical or integrity rights or acts of violence and therefore countries ruled by truly repressive and coercive regimes may receive low scores. Nations who are successful at oppressing their citizens or who have committed acts of violence in the past to deter resistance generally do not have to commit many acts of violence in order to maintain control. For example, the former USSR would score low on the Political Terror Scale and that score would not reflect the overall level of oppression present in that society.

== See also ==
- Political violence
