= Kenya Finance Bill 2024 =

2024 bill proposed for tax increase in Kenya

Finance Bill, 2024

Parliament of Kenya
- Long title: A Bill for an Act to amend the law relating to various taxes and duties; and for matters incidental thereto.
- Considered by: National Assembly (Kenya)
- Signed: 27 June 2024 (prospective)
- Vetoed by: William Ruto
- Vetoed: 26 June 2024

Legislative history
- Bill citation: National Assembly Bills No. 30
- Introduced by: Cabinet Secretary for the National Treasury and Economic Planning
- Introduced: 9 May 2024
- Second reading: 20 June 2024
- Third reading: 24 June 2024
- Status: Not passed

The Finance Bill, 2024 was a legislative bill that proposed changes to the tax system of Kenya, which involves tax increases. The proposed bill aims to raise 346 billion Kenyan shillings (KSh) to pay off debt and fund development projects. It was first introduced in May 2024 and has been controversial, with some provisions facing public outcry. The proposal sparked the Kenya Finance Bill protests and public opposition. On 25 June 2024, Parliament approved the Finance Bill despite ongoing protests; however, President William Ruto declined to sign it into law the following day after an assault incident in the Parliament of Kenya.

On 28 June, President Ruto rejected the Finance Bill and ordered a KSh 999 billion budget cut. Concurrently, he signed the "Appropriations Bill 2024" into law. These budget cuts impacted national and county governments, including the executive, legislature, judiciary, and constitutional commissions. The National Treasury was instructed to prepare supplementary estimates to reflect these reductions and limit spending to essential services. Ruto emphasized that these measures were necessary to offset the revenue shortfall caused by the rejection of the Finance Bill.

== Background ==
The Kenyan government agreed to a US$92.34 million loan with the International Monetary Fund in April 2021 to address funding shortfalls related to the impacts of the COVID-19 pandemic and existing national debt. Conditions of this loan included government reform. Finance Minister Njuguna Ndung'u announced value added tax increases, removal of subsidies, and expansion of the tax base under guidance of the IMF and World Bank in the 2023 Finance Bill. In 2023, the World Bank warned the plans would negatively affect economic growth, though the IMF supported more reforms to remain compliant with the terms of the loan, necessitating similar further measures in the 2024 Finance Bill.

== Provisions ==
Provisions of the bill that survived to the third reading included:

- As of 21 June, a 1.5% tax on local digital platforms that offers services including online jobs, rentals, food delivery, and ride hailing, subject to parliamentary approval.
- As of 21 June, a value-added tax on electric bikes, buses, and solar and lithium-ion batteries. The Associated Battery Manufacturers, a Nairobi-based group, has criticized this, stating that it would increase the cost of a solar battery in Kenya by $312 (45,000 Kenyan shillings).
- As of 21 June, a 6% Significant Economic Presence tax. This would charge additional taxes to non-residents who make money in Kenya through digital platforms, and has generated uproar from ride-hailing companies like Bolt and Uber, who state concerns that they would be forced to leave.

Provisions of the bill removed or modified after protests included:

- A 16% value-added tax on bread and the transportation of sugar cane.
- A 15% to 40% value-added tax on financial services and foreign exchange transactions.
- A 16% value-added tax on imported table eggs, onions and potatoes.
- An increase from 15% to 20% in the excise tax on mobile money transfer charges.
- An 25% excise duty on vegetable oil, which, according to the Kenyan Association of Manufacturers, could have spiked the price of soap by 80%.
- A tax on motor vehicle owners requiring them to annually pay 2.5% of their car's value, with a minimum of KSh 5,000 and a maximum of KSh 100,000.

An "Eco Levy", aiming to stop pollution and excess waste at the office/household level, which affects diapers, batteries/dry cells, smartphones, earphones, clocks, radios, TV sets, and cameras, as well as plastic packaging materials and a variety of other products, was curtailed to only affect imported products.

== Series ==
=== First reading ===
The Finance Bill 2024 was introduced in May and had its first reading in Parliament on 13 May 2024.

=== Amendments ===
Amidst protests, the Kenyan government scrapped parts of the bill on 18 June 2024. According to Kuria Kimani, chairman of Kenya's Finance and National Planning Committee, the proposed tax increases that were scrapped included a 16% value-added tax (VAT) on bread and taxes on motor vehicles, vegetable oil, and mobile money transfers. This did not satisfy protestors, who demanded that the entire bill be abandoned.

=== Second reading ===
The second reading of the Finance Bill took place on 20 June 2024, following which the members of parliament voted on the general outline of the proposed law. The bill passed the second reading, with 204 members voting for it, while 115 opposed it. No members abstained from the vote.

=== Third reading and storming of the Parliament ===
On 24 June, lawmakers met at the Parliament of Kenya, and Parliament approved the finance bill despite the protests. It was expected to be presented on 27 June to President William Ruto to be signed into law. However, on 25 June 2024, the Parliament of Kenya was stormed by protestors, resulting in deaths and injuries. As a result, the president declined to sign the bill, acknowledging that the Kenyan people "want nothing" to do with it. The bill therefore remained withdrawn in totality.
