= Kenya Finance Bill protests =

2024 anti-tax protests in Kenya

- Hashtag Reject Finance Bill 2024; Part of Gen Z protests
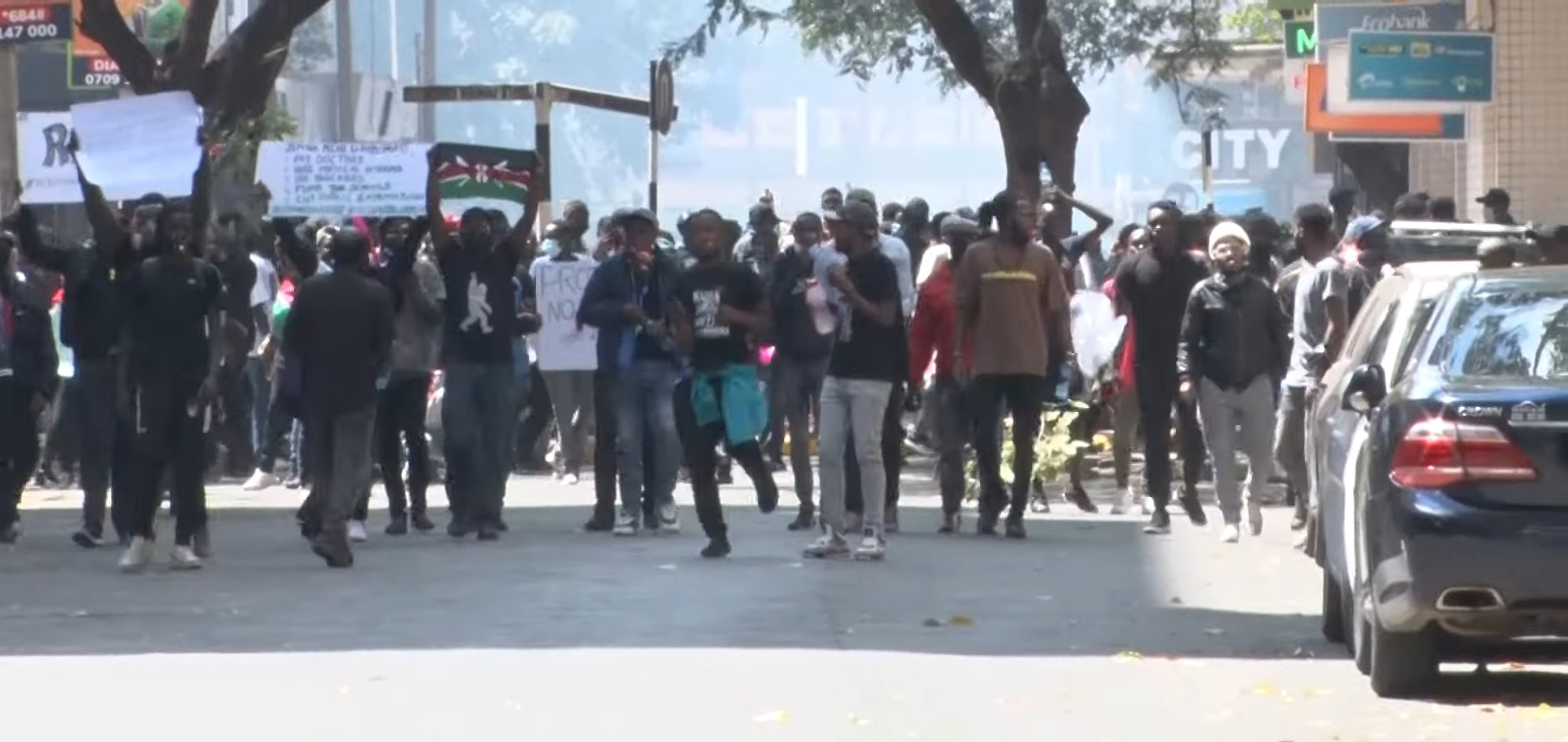
- Protesters in Nairobi
- Date: 18 June – 8 August 2024 (1 month, 3 weeks, and 4 days)
- Location: Kenya
- Caused by: Proposed bill in Parliament that would increase taxes; Corruption; Alleged detentions of critics
- Methods: Protests, demonstrations, civil disobedience, civil resistance, online activism, riots, hacktivism, mass mobilization
- Status: Ended
- Result: Portions of the bill are overturned
- Concessions: 18 June; Government of Kenya scrapped parts of the Bill.: 26 June; President William Ruto declines to sign the Bill into law.: 28 June; The Bill is rejected by the Government of Kenya.

Parties
(Kenya) Protesters; Youth protesters	Government of Kenya; Parliament of Kenya; Kenya Police; Kenya Defence Forces; Government of Uganda (alleged); Uganda People's Defence Force (alleged)

Deaths, arrests and damages
- Deaths: 80+
- Injuries: 230+
- Arrested: 283
- Damage: The Kenyan Parliament building set ablaze

A series of decentralized mass protests took place in Kenya in response to tax increases proposed by the Government of Kenya in the Finance Bill 2024. Following the storming of the Kenyan Parliament, president William Ruto reportedly rejected the Bill on 28 June; signed into law the "Appropriations Bill 2024" to address the budget shortfall caused by the rejection. Nonetheless, protests escalated into riots on 2 July, as demonstrators demanded Ruto's resignation.

In May 2024, the proposed tax increases were heavily criticized by younger Kenyans who spearheaded the protests. They mobilized using social media platforms like X, TikTok, and Instagram. Young activists circulated calls to action, translated the bill into several local languages, used the artificial intelligence tool ChatGPT to answer questions about the bill, and leaked the phone numbers of political leaders allowing protesters to spam them with SMS and WhatsApp messages. This move was first popularized by Twitter influencer Amerix who also posted a list of names of MPs and their phone numbers and encouraged Kenyans to share more numbers and send their message to the MPs.

Peaceful protests began on 18 June in Nairobi, spreading to other parts of the country, leading to widely condemned arrests. On 18 June, the Kenyan Parliament amended the bill, removing some controversial clauses. However, the bill was nonetheless passed the next day, leading to nationwide protests and heavy clashes with security forces. On 25 June protesters stormed the Parliament buildings, leading to clashes with police that resulted in at least 22 deaths and numerous injuries. Human Rights Watch accused Kenyan security services of abducting, torturing and extrajudicially executing citizens believed to be leaders of antigovernment protests.

On 26 June, President Ruto held a press conference and decided to withhold the signing of the bill due to its unpopularity.

There have been reports of the alleged participation of Ugandan units in the repression of the protests by various individuals within the protesters side.

== Background ==
The Kenya Finance Bill protests trace back to the 2023 antigovernment protests that followed the passing of tax reforms in the "Kenya Finance Bill 2023." These protests, led by former prime minister Raila Odinga, left six people dead and dozens injured.

The protests spread nationwide on 20 June 2024, as police cracked down on demonstrators.

The 2024 Finance Bill is the first in a series of tax reforms based on a Medium-Term Revenue Strategy (MTRS) devised and published by the Kenyan government in 2023 through the Ministry of National Treasury and Economic Planning. The MTRS aims to increase the tax-to-GDP ratio in Kenya from 13.5% to at least 20% from 2024 to 2027. The figures from the MTRS are based on an International Monetary Fund estimate that Kenya has a potential of 25% tax-to-GDP ratio. Some of the suggestion of the MTRS are what informed the details of the Finance Bill 2024 including an annual circulation tax for all motor-vehicles and review of excise duty on petroleum products.

Kenya has been listed as one of the countries with problems with financial solvency since at least 2022. The Finance Bill was supposed to allow Kenya's government to have its debt restructured by the IMF.

=== Implications of the proposed bill ===
Some of the major changes proposed in the original 2024 Finance Bill include:

==== Impact on privacy ====
Amendment to the Kenya Data Protection Act of 2019 allows the Kenya Revenue Authority (KRA) to access the financial information of Kenyans, such as mobile money statements, without court orders and at their own discretion.

==== Impact on cost of living ====
To raise taxes, the bill proposed the following measures which would result in the rise of the cost of living:

- Introduction of an Eco levy on all imported products that harm the environment such as sanitary towels, diapers, motorcycles, tires, plastic packaging, electronic devices, audio-visual recording equipment, radio equipment, and electronic equipment.
- Change of tax status of ordinary bread, transportation of sugarcane from farms to milling factories, locally assembled mobile phones, electric bikes, solar and lithium-ion batteries, and electric buses from tax-exempt to standard which would introduce a 16% VAT on the items.
- Change of how excise duty is calculated for alcoholic beverages, cigarettes and tobacco-based products to increase collection on those items. This could see the tax on alcoholic beverages and cigarettes increase by up to 40% or higher for more potent alcoholic beverages.
- Introduction of a 25% excise duty on vegetable and seed oils and 5% duty or KES 27,000 per tons on coal (whichever is higher).
- Increase of the Road Maintenance Levy from KES18 to KES25 per liter of fuel, which will raise the price of fuel even further.
- Increase of excise duty to 20% for financial services transactions, telephone and internet services, lottery, betting, gaming, and advertisements on the internet and social media.

In the absence of cheaper or viable manufacturers for some of the essential products, some of the measures would result in a higher retail price driving up the cost of living.

==== Other tax measures ====
- Introduction of a 2.5% motor vehicle tax with a minimum of KES 5,000 and a maximum of KES 100,000. This was later amended to remove the ceiling.
- Extension of the time that the Kenya Revenue Authority can issue a decision from 60 to 90 days.
- Introduction of a minimum top-up tax of 15% on resident individuals or entities with a permanent presence in Kenya, affiliated with multinational groups earning over EUR 750 million annually in at least two of the previous four years preceding the first year of income.
- Withholding tax on payments made for goods supplied to public entities at 3% for residents and 5% for non-residents.
- Introduction of a withholding tax on interest from infrastructure bonds with a maturity of at least three years at the rate of 5% for residents and 15% for non-residents.
- Introduction of a withholding tax of 5% for residents and 15% for non-residents on any sale in shops hosted by any digital marketplace. The digital marketplace would be required to withhold the required amount and remit it to the government.
- Change of tax status for fertilizers, pesticides and fungicides from zero-rated to exempt which means that the tax on these items is still zero but manufacturers can no longer claim VAT on these items.

== Casualties and abductions ==
The number of casualties is unconfirmed, although the current estimate exceeds 10. The ambiguity arises from abductions, extrajudicial killings, and the tampering and withholding of evidence and information by the Kenya Police. However, injuries have been experienced by both protesters and police officers with the former suffering injuries resulting from police's extreme rules of engagement towards protesters. Despite being mostly peaceful initially, the protests resulted in at least two protesters killed by the police on 20 June, and around 200 injuries. Journalists and observers were among those injured. One police officer lost both forearms when a tear gas canister ignited after he delayed releasing it.

There have been numerous reports details detailing arbitrary arrests unsanctioned by courts and abductions of key persons of interest by the various agencies of the Kenya National Police. These include the abduction of veteran journalist, Macharia Gaitho at the Karen police station.

Human Rights Watch accused Kenyan security services of abducting, torturing and killing citizens believed to be leaders of antigovernment protests. Kenya's independent policing review body, the Independent Policing Oversight Authority (IPOA), launched a probe into the fatal police shooting of protesters with live ammunitions during the 20 June protests. On 25 June, protestors stormed the Parliament in Nairobi after the law was approved. Nineteen people were shot dead by police. Three other people were also killed in other cities.

== Reactions ==
=== International Monetary Fund ===
Given that the Finance Bill 2024 was a direct reaction to the demands of the International Monetary Fund and resulting overwhelmingly negative reactions directed at the institution during the protests, IMF's communications director, Julie Kozack apologized to the Kenyans for the resulting bloodshed but reiterated that austerity measures and a change in policy by the Kenyan government towards debt were critical to Kenya's economic future.

=== Celebrities ===
Some internationally recognized celebrities and public figures have drawn attention to and supported the protests through tweets or other actions. For instance, Jamaican dancehall artist Konshens waved a flag and declared his support for the protests during his performance at the 2024 Summerjam festival in Germany.

Amidst the 20 June nationwide protests, "football Twitter," a soccer sub-culture on the X platform, simultaneously threw their support behind the protesting youths, rallying the world around Kenya by amplifying the use of hashtag #RejectFinanceBill2024.

On 23 June, Ugandan opposition leader and activist Bobi Wine voiced, using X, his support for the protests. Encouraging the protesters, he said, "Power to you, the young people of Kenya. You are speaking up and your voices are being heard far beyond the Kenyan borders. We hope your leaders too are listening! We continue to stand in solidarity with you. Viva." Many other international celebrities have also shown their support for the protesters. They shared posts of demonstrations and other banners.

=== Anonymous ===
The protests have seen international and local reactions since 19 June, with many online demanding the cancellation of the bill. Among them was Anonymous, a decentralized international hacker group, which warned President Ruto and the parliamentarians that it would launch cyber attacks.

=== Religious figures ===
On 23 June, during Holy Mass at the Cathedral of the ADN, Youth Serving Christ (YSC) members called the Finance Bill 2024 a common "enemy" for well-meaning Kenyans. They urged the congregation to familiarize themselves with the details of the Bill and appealed for prayers to ensure its rejection.

=== Opposition politicians ===
On 24 June, the Azimio Coalition party, under the leadership of the then minority leader Opiyo Wandayi, announced its unanimous rejection of the Finance Bill 2024 in its entirety. The party requested that its members in Parliament who had submitted amendments to the bill withdraw them immediately. However, the coalition's leader, Raila Odinga, has faced accusations of lacking support for the protests and of attempting to exploit the protests for personal gain by serving as a propaganda tool for the incumbent regime.

=== Julius Malema ===
On 24 June 2024, the Economic Freedom Fighters in South Africa led by Julius Malema made a statement standing with the protesters. The EFF says "We stand in solidarity with the people of Kenya who are bravely protesting against the exploitative legislation that seeks to impose severe tax."

Gideon Moi, Kenyan politician and party leader of the Kenya African National Union condemned the arrest and abduction of people perceived to be leaders of the protests. He said an attempt to suppress the voices of those who bear the brunt of over-taxation, unresponsive economic policies, and lack of accountability on the part of the government through unlawful tactics, is unacceptable.

=== Human rights organizations ===
On 25 June, Secretary-General of the United Nations António Guterres urged Kenya's police and security forces to "exercise restraint," stating that he was "deeply concerned over the reported violence that we've seen."

The Kenya National Commission on Human Rights condemned the flagrant abuses of basic human rights by actions committed by the government including abductions, arbitrary arrests, violence on unarmed protesters and journalists and criticized the premature deployment of the Kenya Defence Forces forces to support the operations of the Kenya Police.

Human rights groups such as Amnesty Kenya, Kenyan associations of content creators, lawyers, medical officers, human rights defenders, and twenty-seven international organizations have unanimously added their voices to the protests against the bill, calling for uninterrupted internet access during the nationwide protests on 25 and 27 June. Earlier, rumors had spread that the Government of Kenya would shut down the internet during the scheduled protests to impede communication among the protesters.

The United States called for calm, and 13 other nations, including Canada, Germany, and Britain, expressed being "especially shocked" by the scenes outside parliament. US Secretary of State Antony Blinken reportedly spoke with President Ruto to urge restraint.

The Kenya Conference of Catholic Bishops condemned the killing of protesters who were killed on 25 June protests.

Amnesty International called for a commission to investigate the deaths of protesters.

== State response ==
Following the protests, the Kenyan National Assembly officially approved the deployment of soldiers to assist the police in containing the already escalating protests on 25 June. Protesters had vowed to continue the protests on 27 June.

President William Ruto declared the protests "treasonous" and vowed a "full response" against protesters after the events of 25 June, during which protesters were met with tear gas, water cannons, rubber bullets, and, according to rights groups, live ammunition. In response, protesters stormed the Parliament of Kenya and set parts of it on fire the same day. Addressing the deadly incident, Ruto stated, "We shall provide a full, effective, and expeditious response to today's treasonous events." He conveyed during a press briefing in Nairobi that the demonstrations had been "hijacked by dangerous people."

=== Deployment of the Kenya Defence Forces ===
Following the events of the 25 June protests, the former Cabinet Secretary for Interior and National Administration, Adan Duale, issued a gazette notice deploying the Kenya Defence Forces (KDF) to assist in anti-protest activities alongside the National Police Service (NPS). This action was in violation of the Kenyan constitution, prompting the National Assembly to reconvene and approve the request. Despite acknowledging the irregularity of the process, Kenyan judge Lawrence Mugambi permitted the deployment to proceed under the condition that clear areas and duration of operation, as well as rules of engagement by the KDF, be published within two days of the ruling. Subsequently, the Cabinet Secretary issued a new gazette notice to comply with these requirements.

=== Cabinet reshuffle ===
In response to the protests, President Ruto dismissed his entire cabinet on 11 July, retaining only Prime Cabinet Secretary and concurrent Foreign Minister Musalia Mudavadi and Impeached Former Deputy President Rigathi Gachagua in their positions. However, he announced the reappointment of six of his former ministers albeit in different positions in the cabinet, on 19 July. On 24 July, Ruto appointed four members of the opposition Orange Democratic Movement led by Raila Odinga to his cabinet.

== Timeline of events ==
=== 13 May to 18 June – Online mobilization ===
The #RejectFinanceBill2024 movement commenced on TikTok before spreading to X, with the dissemination of the anti-tax campaign further facilitated by platforms such as Instagram and WhatsApp.

Initially, the movement began as a call to action for citizens to urge their members of parliament to vote against the bill by publicly sharing the phone numbers of various parliamentarians. When it became evident that this approach was ineffective, posters calling for a demonstration on Tuesday, 18 June 2024, began circulating on all social media platforms, encouraging widespread participation in protests against the bill. This culminated in the emergence of the hashtag #OccupyParliament.

=== 18–19 June ===
The first day of protests saw hundreds of Kenyans take to the streets of the capital, Nairobi, to demonstrate against the bill. They urged members of parliament to vote against the bill in the passing of the 2nd reading held on 20 June 2024. In what was largely a peaceful protest, Kenyans, whose original intention was to sit outside the parliament buildings were thwarted by the police who lobbied tear gas canisters at them. Nairobi Police Commander Adamson Bungei stated that no group had been granted permission to protest. 210 people were arrested, and tear gas was used by police. Concerns about looting led to the temporary closure of multiple businesses. Despite these arrests, demonstrations and a planned sit-in outside parliament buildings continued. The Law Society of Kenya and human rights organizations in Nairobi and across the world condemned the violence of police against the protesters. Journalists were also assaulted in the protests, leading to condemnation from the Media Council of Kenya and several media outlets in Kenya. In spite of the violence, there were no deaths on either side on the first day of protests.

In response to the police violence, Kenyans took to social media platforms like X and publicly published personal information of the police officers captured in photos or videos committing violence against peaceful protesters. They published identification numbers, phone numbers and family details.

All arrested individuals were released the next day following lobbying from the Kenyan people, political leaders and human rights groups like Amnesty International.

In response to the public outcry voiced across the country, the budgetary committee proposed some amendments to the bill striking out some of the controversial sections of the bill. Some of the amended items include:

- Removal of the 16% VAT on ordinary bread, transportation of sugar cane, financial services and foreign exchange transactions.
- Removal of the 2.5% motor vehicle tax.
- Reversal of the proposed 20% excise duty on mobile money payments to the current 15%.
- Removal of excise duty on imported eggs, potatoes and onions.
- Removal of the clause allowing the Kenya Revenue Authority to have access to financial accounts of Kenyans without a court order.

However, scores of Kenyans were not satisfied with the amendments. They took to the streets again to protest against the bill and vowed never to stop until the entire bill was scrapped. This gave birth to the emergence of the hashtag #RejectNotAmend.

=== 20 June ===
The third day of protests preceded a House sitting for the second reading of the Finance Bill. Thousands of Kenyans in 19 of the country's 47 counties, including the capital Nairobi and the cities and towns of Mombasa, Kisumu, Eldoret, Meru, Lodwar, Kakamega, Kisii, Nakuru, Nyeri, Nanyuki, and Kilifi, took to the streets again to urge MPs to vote against the bill during the parliamentary sitting held that day.

The results of the parliamentary voting were 204 against 115, with the majority of MPs voting for the bill.

In the week that led to the introduction of the bill, disgruntled youths leaked the phone numbers of the involved parliamentarians and bombarded them with calls and texts. They expressed dissent and urged them to reject the bill.

In a graduation ceremony at Garissa University attended by President Ruto, people could be seen chanting "Reject Finance Bill 2024" as the presidential motorcade drove through the town.

Security forces were deployed to contain the protests, and in a bid to disperse the protesters, the police used water cannons and tear gas against them. There were also allegations of the use of live ammunition against the protesters. As a result, more than 200 people were injured, with 8 considered to be in critical condition, according to the Kenya Red Cross Society. One protester was reported dead after being shot by a law enforcement officer. Another protester, who was injured during the protests after a tear gas canister hit him, died on 22 June 2024.

In reaction to the killings of protesters, the youths declared "7 days of rage" and called for a national strike on 25 June to protest police brutality against fellow demonstrators.

== Seven days of rage ==
Following the fatal shooting of Rex Kanyeki Masai and other protesters on 20 June, a series of protests dubbed "seven days of rage," took place from 21 to 27 June. Amnesty International reported numerous injuries and the use of excessive force by the police. According to their findings, at least five individuals succumbed to gunshot wounds, with thirty-one others sustaining injuries. Thirteen people were shot with live bullets, four with rubber bullets, and three were hit by launcher canisters. Additionally, eleven individuals suffered minor injuries. The organization also reported twenty-one cases of abductions and disappearances allegedly involving both uniformed and non-uniformed officers. Among those affected were individuals like Martin Kimunya, Shadrack Kiprono and Kevin Monari, with some later released. Additionally, over fifty-two arrests were made during this period.

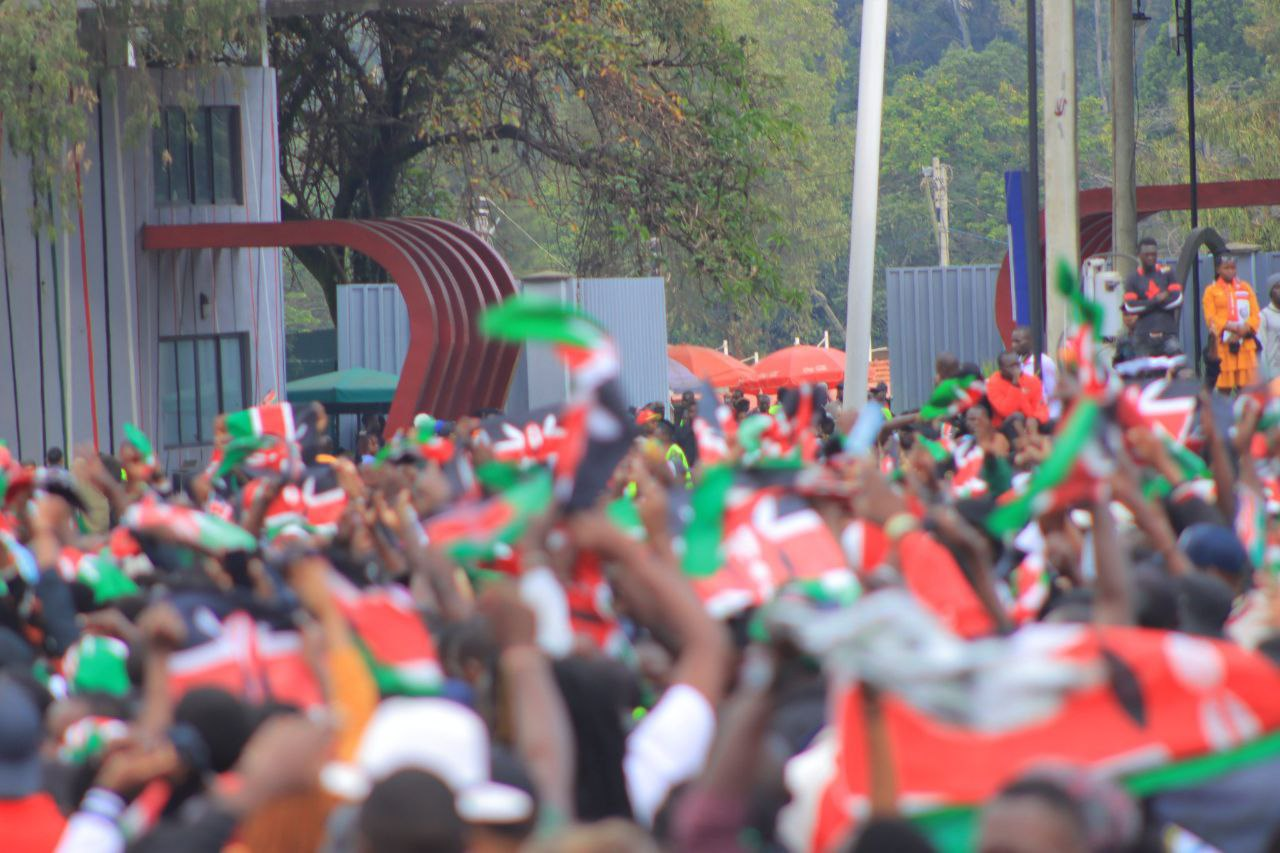
Finance bill demos Kenya

=== 22 June ===
Protesters were called to visit all its usual bars and clubs. It was announced that all music stopped at midnight, and chants of RutoMustGo!" and "Reject finance bill!" reverberated through the towns.

=== 23 June ===
The Government of Kenya said President Ruto was ready for conversations with the protesters, saying that he was "proud of our young people." Nevertheless, protesters called for a nationwide strike on 25 June 2024 to further their demands.

Catholic youths in Nairobi's Archdiocese joined protests against calling it an "enemy" for its potential to overtax citizens and promote oppression. They appealed for prayers and public understanding of the bill's implications. Kenyan Catholic Bishops supported the youth, condemning the bill's punitive taxes and urging the government to address protesters' concerns thoughtfully and peacefully.

Kenyans in Dallas, led by the Roots Party leader, George Wajackoyah protested against the bill.

=== 24 June ===
Hundreds of youths from Lamu County staged street protests against the bill. The protesters condemned the government for pushing what they termed as an "unrealistic agenda."

The Government of Kenya said it would allow the planned nationwide protest scheduled for 25 June. The Interior Security Cabinet Secretary, Kithure Kindiki, stated that those who wished to demonstrate could go ahead as long as the protests remained peaceful.

Rights groups called for uninterrupted Internet during protests.

=== 25 June ===
Protesters, numbering in thousands, managed to break through police barricades and entered the parliamentary complex. Amnesty International Kenya reported that police fired live rounds, injuring many protesters. In the chaos, a section of Parliament housing offices was set on fire, further escalating the situation. Heavy gunfire from police officers continued as they struggled to control the defiant crowd.

President Ruto later denounced the protests, calling them "treasonous." The Ministry of Defence stated that the military had been deployed to support the police.

=== 26 June ===
In a press conference with news outlets, the president of the Kenya Medical Association, Simon Kigondu, said that at least 13 people had been killed, adding that he had never seen "such level of violence against unarmed people."

Deputy Azimio opposition leader Martha Karua termed the deployment of the Kenya Defence Forces unconstitutional. Hours later the chief Azimio opposition leader Raila Odinga said "The Constitution seems to have been suspended. We cannot allow that. The government has unleashed brute force on our country's children and more seems to be on the way. We cannot allow that," Instead he called on the government to consider dialogue with Kenyans opposed to the Finance Bill 2024.

The Law Society of Kenya sued Defence CS, Aden Duale, and the National Assembly over military deployment. It urged the court to suspend the decision to deploy the military pending a hearing and determination of the case. It also called upon the International Community to conduct an independent investigation on the security operations on the Githurai area the previous night.

In the evening the Kenya National Human Rights Commission said that at least 22 people were killed, and their Commission chairperson Roseline Odede told journalists that 300 others were injured and 50 people were arrested.

President Ruto addressed the nation, saying that he would not sign the 2024 Finance Bill, stating that, "the people have spoken." He added that it will be withdrawn and he had come to an agreement with the MPs of his party for that to be their collective position. Despite this, protestors said they will go ahead with a "One Million People March" on 27 June, with plans to "block roads leading to the capital," and calls to occupy the State House in Nairobi.

=== 27 June ===
Protests were held in cities across the country with demonstrators calling for Ruto's resignation. Seven people were shot by police in Homa Bay. The Communist Party of Kenya called for Ruto to resign and presented ten demands to the government, calling for a "total cessation of taxation on basic commodities such as food, healthcare, and education, and the complete rejection of the Finance Bill 2024".

=== 28 June ===
The High Court prohibited the National Police Service (NPS) from using water cannons, tear gas, live ammunition, rubber bullets, and other crude weapons against protesters opposing the Finance Bill 2024. Justice Mugure Thande's ruling also barred the police from using brute force or engaging in extrajudicial killings, arrests, abductions, harassment, or any inhumane treatment of protesters. The decision followed a petition by Saitabao Ole Kanchory, who argued that the police had been violating protesters' rights through arbitrary arrests and intimidation. However, the court also ruled in favor of the government's decision to deploy the military against the protesters, but required the authorities to clarify the duration of their deployment and their rules of engagement within two days.

Following widespread protests, President Ruto rejected the Finance Bill and ordered a Sh346 billion budget cut. At the same time, he signed the "Appropriations Bill 2024" into law. These budget cuts affected national and county governments, including the executive, legislature, judiciary, and constitutional commissions. The National Treasury was directed to prepare supplementary estimates to reflect these reductions and restrict spending to essential services. Ruto emphasized that these measures were necessary to compensate for the revenue shortfall from the rejected Finance Bill.

=== 29 June ===
The funeral of Benson Kamau, who was one of the protesters killed during the storming of Parliament, was held, during which his casket was carried by hundreds of protesters.

=== 1 July ===
Finance Minister Njuguna Ndung'u emphasized the government's commitment to reducing spending after withdrawing the proposed tax hikes.

Protesters rejected President Ruto's appeals for dialogue as their demands had escalated, including calls for his resignation. They announced fresh protests scheduled for 2 July to occupy Nairobi's Central Business District, sharing their plans on social media under the hashtag #OccupyCBDTuesday.

=== 2 July ===
Clashes broke out in Nairobi between police and protesters demanding Ruto's resignation. Protesters barricaded Waiyaki Way, the main road through Nairobi's center, and threw stones at police in the central business district, while police used tear gas on them. Protests also occurred in Mombasa, Kisumu, Nakuru, and Nyeri. About 272 people were arrested on suspicion of looting during the protests.

=== 5 July ===
Ruto addressed protesters on X at a forum hosted by influencer Osama Otero. He apologized for Otero's abduction by police during the protest as well as the "arrogance and show of opulence" by legislators and ministers from his party. He also pledged to act against "rogue" police officers who fired at unarmed civilians during the protests.

President Ruto announced significant austerity measures following the protests. He eliminated budget provisions for the First and Second Ladies' offices, cut government renovation budgets by 50%, dissolved 47 state corporations, halted the hiring of chief administrative secretaries, and mandated the retirement of civil servants aged 60 and above. These steps aimed to address Kenya's high public debt, which stood at 68% of GDP. To respond to the demand of protestors to curb corruption, he banned the participation of politicians in harambees, fundraising events that have become associated with corruption due to politicians giving money directly to constituents.

=== 7 July ===
Coinciding with the anniversary of the 1990 Saba Saba Day protests that led to the introduction of multiparty democracy in Kenya, a concert was held in Uhuru Park in Nairobi to commemorate those killed during the protests against the finance bill.

=== 11 July ===
In a state briefing, president Ruto dissolved his cabinet, with the exception of deputy president Rigathi Gachagua and prime cabinet secretary and concurrent foreign minister Musalia Mudavadi.

=== 12 July ===
Student protesters blocked a major highway in protest over the discovery of the remains of a protester who was killed and dumped in a quarry outside Nairobi. The demonstrators accused police of killing the victim after he posted a video of himself participating in the storming of the Kenyan parliament.

Japheth Koome Nchebere resigned as Inspector-general of Police amid the outcry over authorities' response to the protests. He was replaced by his deputy, Douglas Kanja.

=== 16 July ===
Protests demanding Ruto's resignation were held in Nairobi, Mombasa, Kisumu and Eldoret, leading to clashes with security forces. Protesters also blocked the Nairobi-Namanga highway and lit bonfires there. One person was killed, bringing the total number of deaths since the start of the protests to at least 50.

=== 17 July ===
Police ordered an indefinite ban on protests in the center of Nairobi, citing public safety issues.

=== 18 July ===
The High Court issued a "conservatory order" against the ban on protests in Nairobi imposed by police the previous day, citing violations on the right to assembly. Following the ban, the vice-chair of the Kenyan Communist Party, Booker Ngesa Omole, was summoned to the Director of Criminal Investigation's office in what the Party described as attempted intimidation.

=== 8 August ===
Police fired tear gas on protesters during the swearing-in ceremony of the new cabinet of president Ruto. The unrest was driven by public dissatisfaction with the appointment of certain cabinet members.

== Aftermath of the protests ==
Ruto pledged to start a dialogue with Kenyan youth to listen to their grievances and arrive to a solution. He entered into a what was called Memorandum of Understanding with ODM party and Raila Odinga, where key issues of attention were laid out and were to be fulfilled by Ruto's government. As a result, some ODM members were appointed the cabinet. Many young people termed this a traitorous move by both parties and from Odinga, accusing Odinga of being an opportunist.

=== Missing abducted protestors ===
According to a Human Rights' Watch World Report 2026, 26 people abducted in 2024 and 16 in 2025 protests are still missing and their whereabouts are still unknown as of 2026.

== Commemorative protests ==
On 25 June 2025 and 2026, there were commemorative protests in honour of those who were killed and injured during the protests.

During the 2025 protests, 16 people were killed and at least 400 injured.

During the 2026 protests, families of the dead attempted to lay wreaths at parliament. The building was cordoned off and they were forced to do so on barbed wire on its outskirts. Families such of 12-year-old Kennedy decried lack of justice, compensation and accountability two years after his death. According to Cabinet Secretary for the Interior and National Administration Kipchumba Murkomen, 355 people were arrested.

The NPS used an Armoured Personnel Carrier equipped with a Long-range acoustic device (LRAD) against protesters. LRADs are known to cause permanent hearing loss and can be lethal. Although there are no laws against its use in Kenya, it's prohibited in crowd dispersal in nations like the United States, Poland and Serbia.

Multiple people were allegedly abducted by police officers. Among them were six individuals who were forced into police vehicles, passed through to nine different police stations and eventually held in captivity by unknown masked men. They were tortured for about 48 hours, warned against revealing the ordeal to journalists and later dumped in different parts of Nairobi. They were taken to Nairobi Women's Hospital for treatment. The six also appeared in photos taken by journalists being forced into trucks by uniformed police officers. There was nationwide condemnation of the arbitrary arrest and mistreatment of James Mbugua; a visibly crippled man in Nakuru during the protests. Activist Davis Lichuma was found on 29 July in critical condition after being dumped and abandoned in Kenyatta National Hospital. According to the Social Justice Centres Working Group he was so severely tortured that he had to receive specialized medical attention at the Nairobi Women's Hospital. After the 25 June 2026 abductions, human right groups asked for the release of the abducted failure to which, they would demonstrate on Tuesday 30 June. There were demonstrations on the said date after the alleged abductors failed to release all the kidnapped activists and protestors. During the protests, there were three people shot by police officers, one of whom died from injuries sustained.

== Pursuit of justice, accountabilty and political moves ==
KNCHR and LSK headed by its president Faith Odhiambo continued to offer legal representation in court for protest victims and advocate for justice and accontability from the government and Kenya Police on the atrocities committed during the protests. There have since been court proceedings on the same although no one has been convicted until now. In November 2025 activists Kasmuel McOure joined ODM party to further his political ambitions. Activist Morara Kebaso became the government's watchdog, keeping it in check on development matters. Hanifa Adan ensured injured protesters and those hospsitalized had their medical bills paid by the funds from online fundraisings. In October 2025, MP Kimani Ichung'wah in a public address stated that the contentious Finance Bill was split into sections which have since been individually passed into law.

=== Blood Parliament ===
On 28 April 2025, BBC Africa Eye aired a documentary on the killing of protesters outside Kenya's parliament during the protest. The documentary, which was built upon an analysis of images shot during the protest, was blocked from screening by Kenyan authorities.

== See also ==
- 2024 Papua New Guinean unrest
- 2007–2008 Kenyan crisis
- 2025 Kenyan protests
- July Revolution
- Asian Spring
- Gen Z protests
- List of protests in the 21st century
- Kasmuel McOure
- Hanifa Adan
- Maverick Aoko
- Law Society of Kenya
- Babu Owino
- Faith Odhiambo
