= Maverick Aoko =

Kenyan political activist and Internet personality

Scophine Aoko Otieno

Personal details
- Born: 22 March 1992 (age 34) Nyakach, Kisumu
- Occupation: Political activist, Internet personality
- Nickname: Maverick Aoko

Scophine Aoko Otieno (born 22 March 1992), widely known as Maverick Aoko, is a Kenyan social media personality, blogger, and political activist. She is known for her sharp criticism of Ruto's government, her controversial take on politics and political debates, and her firm stance on social issues in Kenya. She is also a journalist and writer. Aoko is from the Luo community.

== Education ==
Aoko attended local school in Kisumu for her primary and secondary education, then joined the Kenya Institute of Mass Communication where she completed a Diploma in Journalism. She then proceeded to join the University of Nairobi for a Bachelor's course in political science.

== Career ==
Throughout her higher education, Aoko engaged in politics and journalism, a move which set the foundation for her political and journalism career. This saw her occasionally work for The Standard, The Kenya Report, Viusasa, and Norwegian Opera News, where she was a content editor and writer.

She became known by many Kenyans for her outspoken nature and fearless approach of social and political issues. This has seen her become a famous figure on X (formerly Twitter), where she posts political insights, sometimes controversial, and fiercely engages in political discussions and social matters. She advocates for men's rights and has frequently criticized feminism. Aoko also advocates for unity and castigates tribalism. She is a supporter and close associate of Babu Owino, who on numerous occasions has stood by her in legal matters.

In August 2025, Aoko declared that she will be vying for the Nairobi woman representative seat in the upcoming 2027 general elections.

== Legal issues ==
Aoko has been in several legal battles over alleged cyber harassment and defamation. In August 2024, she was arrested and questioned by the DCI over alleged cyber harassment and publishing false information. She pleaded not guilty and was released on Ksh.100,000 cash bail. She believed it was unsafe to stay in Kenya and thus moved through several countries including Rwanda, Tanzania, Uganda, and Namibia, regularly returning for case proceedings at Milimani Law Courts. She was acquitted and could freely speak on the personal toll of the ordeal.

In October 2024, Aoko went missing for two weeks after her alleged arrest; after continued calls for concern from Kenyans and politicians on her whereabouts, she was found at the Kenya-Tanzania border.

== Controversy ==
Aoko has openly criticized Ida Odinga on social media, accusing her of foul play and undermining the ODM Party. These claims caused her close allies, including Babu Owino, publicly distance themselves from Aoko's controversial posts.

== Personal life ==
Aoko is currently single. She has previously admitted to having relationships with several politicians in the past. In July 2024, she revealed to have had a miscarriage after her arrest by the police and alleged assault and torture in custody.

== See also ==
- Babu Owino
- Hanifa Adan
- Kenya Finance Bill protests
