= Law Society of Kenya =

Organization for legal professionals

- Type: Professional association
- Location: Nairobi, Kenya
- Official language: English
- President: Charles Kanjama
- Chief Executive Officer: Florence Muturi
- Website: www.lsk.or.ke

The Law Society of Kenya (LSK) is an organization mandated to advise and assist members of the legal profession, the government and the larger public in all matters relating to the administration of justice in Kenya.

It was established by an Act of Parliament – The Law Society of Kenya Act (Chapter 18 of the Laws of Kenya). The current LSK Act, came into effect in 1992. The LSK has over 22,000 practicing advocates in its membership.

== LSK Membership ==
The Law Society of Kenya membership consists of all practicing advocates in Kenya, numbering over twenty-two thousand. By law, one must be a member of the Law Society of Kenya in order to practice as an advocate of the High Court of Kenya.

The Law Society of Kenya also has special and honorary membership. Special membership is conferred upon application to persons who possess the requisite legal qualifications. Honorary membership is conferred by the Council on any person whom it may think fit so to honor. Honorary membership may be conferred for life or for such period as the Council may in any case deem appropriate

The Law Society of Kenya and its members are also members of the East Africa Law Society, the African Bar Association, the Commonwealth Lawyers Association, the Criminal Bar Association, and the International Bar Association.

=== Who can be a member of the Law Society of Kenya ===
1. Any advocate who is a member of the society by virtue of section 28 of the Advocates act.

2. Any person admitted to membership of the society under section 6 of the Law Society of Kenya Act.

3. Any person elected as an honorary member of the society under section 7 of the Law Society of Kenya Act.

4. Any person who may have at any time previously been a member of the society and who complies with the regulations of the society for the time being in force.

5. Any of the following persons who applies for membership of the society in the prescribed manner may be admitted as a member of the society by the council:

- Any person mentioned in section 9 of the Advocates Act.
- Any other legally qualified person for the time being resident in Kenya.

6. Provided that no person who has been expelled from membership of the Society shall thereafter be admitted as a member thereof under this section without the authority of a special resolution.

7. The council may elect as an honorary member of the society any person whom it may think fit so to honor, either for life or for such a period as the council may in any case deem appropriate. Subject to the provision of the sections 27 and 28 of the Advocates Act, every member of the society shall pay the society such annual subscription as may be prescribed from time to time.

=== Benefits of LSK membership ===
==== Information ====
The LSK acts as an information channel keeping members and the wider profession informed of legal developments of interest via its networks.

==== Networking ====
The LSK provides opportunities for members to establish professional connections with legal practitioners in Kenya. Members can participate in committees, present topics at Law Society of Kenya conferences and seminars, and attend networking events organized by the Society.

==== Learning and Training ====
Each year some CPD events are staged around Kenya, from specialist events that address numerous areas of practice. Expert practitioners and leading representatives from government and regulatory bodies present extensive programes – where participants can get actively involved in discussion and debate.

== LSK Blacklist ==
On 16 January 2012 the Law Society of Kenya (LSK) identified several public officials have been mentioned adversely in various reports on issues ranging from corruption to economic crimes. The LSK advised voters not to vote those mentioned in the report as they had previously compromised. The report was titled Realizing Integrity Law: Walking the Talk

== Chairpersons/Presidents ==
Below is a list of Chairpersons of the LSK:

- Humphrey Slade - 1949-1950
- N.S. Mangat, Q.C. - 1950-1951
- L. Kaplan - 1951-1952
- J. Sorabjee, Q.C. - 1952-1953
- C.F. Schermburucker - 1953-1954
- J.M. Nzareth, Q.C. - 1954-1955
- Ivor Lean, Q.C. - 1955-1956
- Justice Madan, Q.C. - 1956-1957
- J.A. Mackie-Robertson, Q.C. - 1957-1958
- Justice Chanan Singh - 1958-1959
- J.O. O’Brien Kelly - 1959-1960
- Justice Madan - 1960-1961
- A.E. Hunter 1961-1962
- Satish Gautama 1962-1963
- Justice Harris 1963-1964
- B.T. Modi 1964-1965
- S.M.C. Thomson 1965-1966
- G.S. Sandhu 1966-1967
- K.B. Keith 1967-1968
- E.P. Nowrojee 1968-1969
- P. Le Pelley 1969-1970
- S.N. Waruhiu 1970-1972
- M.Z.A. Malik 1972-1973
- J.A. Couldrey 1973-1974
- Ramnik Shah 1974-1975
- S. Sangale 1975-1976
- P.J. Ransley 1976-1977
- K.C. Gautama 1977-1979
- S. Amos Wako 1979-1981
- Lee Muthoga 1981-1982
- Mutula Kilonzo 1982-1984
- G.B.M. Kariuki 1984-1986
- Joe Okwach 1986-1988
- Fred Ojiambo 1988-1990
- Paul Muite 1991-1993
- F.W. Kagwe (Ag) 1992-1993
- Willy Mutunga 1993-1995
- Paul Wamae 1995-1997
- Nzamba Kitonga 1997-1999
- Gibson Kamau Kuria 1999-2001
- Raychelle Omamo 2001-2003
- Ahmednasir M Abdullahi 2003-2005
- Tom Adhiambo Ojienda 2005-2007
- Okong'o Omogeni 2007-2010
- Kenneth W. Akide 2010-2012
- Eric Kyalo Mutua 2012-2016
- Isaac E.N Okero 2016-2018
- Allen Waiyaki Gichuhi 2018-2020
- Nelson Havi - 2020 - 2021
- Eric Theuri - 2022 - 2024
- Faith Odhiambo - 2024-2026
- Charles Kanjama - 2026-2028
