= Charles Njonjo =

Kenyan lawyer (1920–2022)

Attorney General of Kenya
- In office 1963–1979
- President: Jomo Kenyatta; Daniel arap Moi
- Prime Minister: Jomo Kenyatta (1963–1964)
- Preceded by: Eric Griffith-Jones
- Succeeded by: James B. Karugu

Minister of Justice
- In office 1978–1982
- Preceded by: Tom Mboya
- Succeeded by: Kiraitu Murungi

Member of Parliament
- In office 1980–1983
- Preceded by: Amos Ng'ang'a
- Succeeded by: Peter K. Kinyanjui
- Constituency: Kikuyu

Personal details
- Born: Charles Mūgane Njonjo; 23 January 1920 Kibichiko, Kikuyu District, Ukamba Province, East Africa Protectorate
- Died: 2 January 2022 (aged 101) Mūthaiga, Nairobi, Kenya
- Spouse: Margaret Bryson (m. 1972)
- Children: 3
- Education: Alliance High School and King's College, Budo, Uganda.
- Alma mater: University of Fort Hare University of Exeter & Gray's Inn

Charles Mūgane Njonjo (23 January 1920 – 2 January 2022) was a Kenyan lawyer who served as Attorney General of Kenya from 1963 to 1979, Minister of Constitutional Affairs and the member of Parliament for Kikuyu Constituency from 1980 to 1983.

Njonjo was also popularly referred to as "The Duke of Kabeteshire".

== Early life and education ==
Njonjo was the son of the late Josiah Njonjo, a paramount chief and one of the foremost collaborators of British colonial rule in Kenya. The Njonjo family were close friends of Harry Leakey, whose son (Louis) and paternal grandson (Richard, who died on the same day as Charles) later played important roles in archaeology and Kenyan politics.

In 1939, Charles and his brother James were admitted to King's College Budo, a rather privileged school in East Africa. After completing his secondary education at Alliance High School in Kikuyu, Njonjo enrolled at Fort Hare University in South Africa, where he graduated with a bachelor's degree in English and South African Law. He graduated in 1946 and returned to Kenya but had the burning ambition to study Law and be called to the Bar. This was forbidden to Africans and the Colonial administration offered him a scholarship to go to England to study Public Administration at the University College of the South West of England at Exeter (now University of Exeter). They wanted him to replace his father Chief Josiah Njonjo in the Provincial Administration. He accepted the scholarship and moved to England in 1947.

He completed his studies in 1949 but rather than returning to Kenya, he began studying Law with the view of being called to the Bar at Gray's Inn. As soon as the Colonial administration in Kenya learnt of his decision to study for the Bar, they cut off his stipend and he had to wait tables to make ends meet. He was also asked to move out of 36 Great Cumberland Place which housed Kenyan students and visiting dignitaries in London. He met a friendly Welshman named Elwyn Jones who was a London solicitor. He took him in to train in his chambers. Njonjo worked there until he was called to the Bar at Gray's Inn in 1952. He was only the second Kenyan African barrister after C.M.G. Argwings-Kodhek who had been called to the Bar in January 1951 at Lincoln's Inn.

Charles Njonjo also served as the first ethnic African Chairman of the Board of Governors (BoG) of The Kenya High School.

== Political career ==
=== Assistant registrar general ===
Njonjo worked in London for two years and returned to Kenya at the end of 1954. He then went into the State Law Office and on 1 March 1955 he was appointed Assistant Registrar General.

=== Deputy Official Receiver ===
In June 1956, he was posted to Mombasa where he worked as the deputy Official Receiver (in charge of Bankruptcies) and later Crown Counsel. He stayed there for five years with his offices based at the Legal Mansion on Fort Jesus Road.

=== Attorney-general ===
In 1963 he was appointed Attorney-General taking over from Eric Newton Griffith-Jones QC. Griffith-Jones had been Kenya's Attorney-General and Minister for Legal Affairs since 1 May 1955. Njonjo become Attorney General in Independent Kenya under President Jomo Kenyatta. In 1976, during a period of tense relations between Kenya and Uganda, Njonjo took part in secret negotiations with Israel that proved instrumental in the success of the Israeli military's Operation Entebbe. The government of Kenya allowed the Israeli armed forces to use Nairobi airport as a stopover base in the context of the military assault on Entebbe airport that ended a week-long hostage crisis involving Israeli air passengers taken prisoner by a PLFP commando.

President Jomo Kenyatta died in 1978, to be succeeded by Moi as Njonjo had anticipated. Charles Njonjo entered into parliament in April 1980 after retiring as attorney general at the age of 60, a post in which he had served for 17 years. He had considered politics for over a decade but hesitated due to lack of a popular base.

=== Kikuyu MP ===
He was elected MP for Kikuyu unchallenged, after the incumbent MP had resigned his seat the day before Njonjo announced his candidacy.

=== Minister for Justice and constitutional affairs ===
In June 1980 he was selected for a newly created cabinet position by Daniel arap Moi, as minister for home and constitutional affairs, during an expected cabinet reshuffle.

=== Miller Inquiry ===
After the attempted coup of 1982, Moi decided to purge his party and cabinet of figures he had established wanted him out of power. Chief among them would be Njonjo, and powerful internal Security minister, G.G. Kariūki. He was dragged through a judicial inquiry, which concluded that he had abused office, and had tried to take over power from Moi. He was forced to resign, effectively destroying his political career. In the early 1990s he was the chairman of the East African Wildlife Society.

=== Return to public life ===
In 1998 he returned to public life, and was appointed chairman of the Kenya Wildlife Service. In October 2006 there were indications that Njonjo was attempting a comeback in Kenyan politics, including his show of support for Raila Odinga.

== Personal life and death ==
In 1972, Njonjo married Margaret Bryson, with whom he had three children, Elizabeth Wairimū, Mary Wambūi, and Josiah Njonjo. He was 51 at the time of his wedding, having passed off many chances to marry earlier. Soon after his return from England, he was to marry Margaret Wanjirū Koinange but broke off the engagement. Ms. Margaret Bryson was the daughter of Anglican missionary Rev. Edgar Bryson. Njonjo had been the best man of his close friend Tom Mboya, who married Pamela Odede at St. Peter Claver's Catholic Church in January 1962

Njonjo and his brother, James, were one of the richest families in Kenya. He had extensive landholding across the country. Njonjo also owned interests in high-profile financial institutions, including banks and insurance companies.

He turned 100 on 23 January 2020, and died of pneumonia, at age 101, on 2 January 2022 at his residence in Old Muthaiga.
