= Department of Justice (Kenya) =

The Department of Justice was formed when the Ministry of Justice, National Cohesion and Constitutional Affairs of the Republic of Kenya was dissolved around 2007. It is the Kenyan government ministry responsible for Legal Policy, Policy on Administration of Justice and Constitutional Matters.

== List of ministers ==
See Minister of Justice (Kenya)

== List of attorneys general ==
See Attorney General of Kenya

== See also ==
- Justice ministry
- Kenya
  - Heads of State of Kenya
  - Heads of Government of Kenya
  - Vice-Presidents of Kenya
  - Colonial Heads of Kenya
