= Minister of Justice (Kenya) =

Following the country's independence from the United Kingdom, the minister of justice of Kenya is a cabinet position created in 1963 and is responsible for the administering of justice, national cohesion and constitutional affairs. The ministerial post is now defunct, and has merged with the Department of Justice.

== List of ministers ==
=== Justice and constitutional affairs ===
- Tom Mboya(1963–1965)
- Charles Njonjo (1978–1983)
- Kiraitu Murungi (2003–2005)*

=== Justice, national cohesion and constitutional affairs ===
- Martha Karua (2006–2009) [1st female]
- Mutula Kilonzo (2009–2011)
- Eugene Wamalwa (2011–2013)

*The position was vacant from 1984-2002.

== See also ==
- Attorney General of Kenya
- Department of Justice (Kenya)
- Justice ministry
- Kenya
  - List of heads of state of Kenya
  - Heads of Government of Kenya
  - Vice-Presidents of Kenya
  - List of colonial governors of Kenya
- Lists of office-holders
