= Akiwumi Commission of Inquiry =

The Akiwumi Commission of Inquiry into Tribal Clashes was a Kenya government commission appointed on 1 July 1998 to investigate various tribal clashes . Its term was extended several times up to 31 July 1999 when it completed its report. The commission submitted its report on 19 August 1999 to then President Daniel arap Moi.

== Terms of Reference ==
The commission's terms of reference were as outlined below:

- To investigate the tribal clashes that have occurred in various parts of Kenya since 1991, with view of establishing and/or determining:
  - The origin, the probable, immediate, and underlying causes of such clashes;
  - The action taken by the police and other law enforcement agencies with respect to any incidents of crime arising out of or committed in the course of the said tribal clashes and where such action was inadequate or insufficient, the reasons there for;
  - The level of preparedness and the effectiveness of law enforcement agencies in controlling the said tribal clashes and in preventing the occurrence of such tribal clashes in future;
- The commission was also to recommend:
  - Prosecution or further criminal investigations against any persons or persons who may have committed offences related to such tribal clashes;
  - Ways, means and measures that must be taken to prevent, control, or eradicate such clashes in future;
  - To do, inquire into or investigate any other matter that is incidental to or connected with the foregoing

== Membership ==
The Akiwumi Commissions were all serving judges led by Justice Akilano Molade Akiwumi.

Nyagah Gacivih and Dorcas Oduor both state counsel in the office of the Attorney General initially served counsel assisting. Later on, Gacivih was removed and replaced by Bernard Chunga, who was then Director of Public Prosecutions in the office of the Attorney General.

== Report & Aftermath ==
Following an order of the High Court, the report of this commission was made public in 2002. The commission's work was cited in the Waki Commission report on the 2007-2008 Kenyan crisis.

== See also ==
- Ethnic Conflicts in Kenya
- Politics of Kenya
- History of Kenya
- Demographics of Kenya
- Waki Commission
