= Crime in Kenya =

Crime is widespread in all regions of Kenya. Petty offences most common, with theft being the most frequently reported crime. Robbery and theft are among the least cited criminal offences. Crime in Kenya often goes unreported and police may lack the training or experience to effectively respond to crimes. Despite the reportedly low crime rate, Kenya faces significant challenges with law enforcement and public officials collaborating with organized crime. As of 2024, Kenya has a criminality score of 7.02 on the Organised Crime Index, the 16th-highest in the world, an improvement from 11th in 2021.

In general, crime rates in Kenya are much lower outside of urban centers such as Nairobi. Kenya is generally considered safe for tourist travel, provided tourists adhere to travel advisory. However, robbery targeting tourists is nevertheless common. There are dedicated police units that deal with mitigating tourist target offences.

== Crime by type ==
=== Carjacking ===
The most common crime in Kenya is carjacking. In early 2007, two U.S. citizens were killed and one was critically injured in two separate carjacking incidents. Nairobi averages about ten vehicle hijackings per day, while Kenyan authorities have limited capacity to deter or investigate such acts. Matatus (public transportation) tend to be targeted since they carry up to 14 passengers.

Although these attacks are often violent, victims are generally not injured if they do not resist. However, victims are sometimes the victims of battery, which can be fatal.

=== Theft and banditry ===
Pickpockets and thieves carry out "snatch and run" crimes on city streets and near crowds. There have been reports of safes being stolen from hotel rooms and hotel desk staff being forced to open safes.

Thieves routinely snatch jewellery and other objects from open vehicle windows while motorists are either stopped at traffic lights or in heavy traffic. Thieves on matatus, buses, and trains may steal valuables from inattentive passengers. Many scams, perpetrated against unsuspecting tourists, are prevalent in and around the city of Nairobi. Many of these involve people impersonating police officers and using fake police ID badges as well as other credentials. Nevertheless, police checkpoints are common in Kenya and all vehicles are required to stop if directed to do so.

There has been an increase in armed banditry in or near many of Kenya's national parks and game reserves, particularly the Samburu, Leshaba, and Masai Mara game reserves. In response, the Kenya Wildlife Service and police have taken some steps to strengthen security in the affected areas, but the problem has not been eliminated. Travelers who do not use the services of reputable travel firms or knowledgeable guides or drivers are especially at risk.

Although sometimes confused with the similarly named North Rift Valley region, where cattle rustling and banditry are common, the separate North Eastern Province has been relatively peaceful since the appointment of its former Provincial Commissioner, Mohamoud Saleh. During his time in office, Saleh established an effective security committee consisting of clan elders and leaders and worked closely with community members to ensure security. Owing to the success of this "Saleh Strategy", in 2010, the Garissa Peace and Development Committee (GPDC) hosted several high-level delegations from adjacent nations such as Uganda and shared its experiences in community building. According to Interpol, the NEP's commercial hub of Garissa is also one of the safest areas in the larger eastern Great Lakes region.

=== Ethnic violence ===
Kenya is generally a peaceful and friendly country in its political activism, it is nonetheless common during elections, referendums, and other political votes for campaign violence to occur around the country, and ethnic clashes account for much of Kenya's problems. An early example of this was during the 1970s, when tribal clashes killed thousands and left tens of thousands homeless, which allowed Daniel arap Moi to be re-elected in balloting, according to the United Nations Office on Drugs and Crime, "marred by violence and fraud."

After 29 December 2007, the day after Kenya's National Parliamentary and presidential elections, violence erupted in major cities across Kenya, including Nairobi, Mombasa, and Kisumu. Clashes were reported throughout Kenya, which resulted in the deaths of over 600 Kenyans. None of these incidents was targeted against the expatriate community.

=== Corruption ===
In the Corruption Perceptions Index 2007, Kenya was ranked 150th out of 179 countries for corruption (least corrupt countries are at the top of the list). In 2007, on a scale of 0 to 10, with 0 the most corrupt and 10 the most transparent, Transparency International rated Kenya 2.1.

In 2006, it was estimated the average urban Kenyan pays 16 bribes per month. Most of these bribes are fairly small but large ones are also taken – bribes worth over KSh.50,000/= (€600, US$700) account for 41% of the total value. There is also corruption on a larger scale with each of the last two government regimes being criticised for their involvement.

The Kenyan Prison Service was not established until 1911 under the Ministry of Home Affairs, Heritage, and Sports. Then in 1917, it was decided to name people to the jobs of Commissioner of Prisons and Assistant Commissioner of Prisons. This now caused the responsibility and management of prisons to be solely controlled by the Commissioner. The current Head of Prison Administration in Kenya is Isaiah Samuel Osugo, who oversees all 108 prisons that are located in Kenya. Throughout the history of Kenya, there has been a long-running tab of corruption and violence that has taken place in the country, which has made an indelible mark on its political system. One fact worth noting is that "According to the EACC, at least 30% of GDP, which is the equivalent to about $6 Billion in the United States, is being lost to corruption." (Amnesty International) The Kenyan government has also been accused of corruption because of inflating costs in procurement processes.

Violence perpetrated by armed groups in Kenya disrupts stability in the region. From 9 December 2023 to 12 January 2024, Armed Conflict Location and Event Data (ACLED) recorded 71 political violence events and 59 reported fatalities in Kenya. The most common event types were riots and violence against civilians, with 26 recorded events, followed by battles, with 16 events. On 25 October 2016, 12 people were killed in the town of Mandera by Al-Shabaab in a guest house that hosted a theatre group. This underscores the impact of systemic corruption within security forces on the Kenyan people. According to Amnesty International, "Security agencies were implicated in human rights violations, including extrajudicial executions, enforced disappearances, and torture." Despite legal protections for freedom of speech and expression, there is evidence of Kenyan authorities intimidating journalists, bloggers, and other influential members of civil society.

=== Terrorism ===
Several persons (possibly tied to al-Qaeda) suspected of involvement with the 1998 East Africa Embassy attacks and the 2002 Kikambala attacks in Mombasa remain at large and potentially dangerous to tourists and Kenyans.

At the urging of the Al-Shabaab militant group, a significant and increasing number of terrorist attacks in Kenya have been carried out by local Kenyans, many of whom are recent converts to Islam. Estimates in 2012 placed the figure of Kenyan fighters at around 10% of Al-Shabaab's total forces.

Referred to as the "Kenyan Mujahideen" by Al-Shabaab's core members, the converts are typically young and overzealous, and being impoverished makes them easier targets for the outfit's recruitment activities. Because the Kenyan insurgents have a different profile from the Somali and Arab militants that allows them to blend in with the general population of Kenya, they are also often harder to track. Reports suggest that Al-Shabaab is attempting to build an even more multi-ethnic generation of fighters in the larger region.

One such recent convert who helped mastermind the Kampala bombings but now cooperates with the Kenyan police believes that in doing so, the group is essentially trying to use local Kenyans to do its "dirty work" for it while its core members escape unscathed. According to diplomats, Muslim areas in coastal Kenya and Tanzania, such as Mombasa and Zanzibar, are also especially vulnerable for recruitment.

=== Rape ===
The St. Kizito massacre was a high-profile rape and massacre of girls on 13 July 1991 at the coeducational boarding secondary school St. Kizito in Meru County, named after Saint Kizito. 71 girls were raped and 19 killed by their male classmates.

=== Drug abuse ===
Drug abuse has become a major issue in Kenya, especially in Mombasa which is affected by this issue more than any other part of the country. Young men in their early 20s have been the most affected demographic. Women in Mombasa have held public protests, asking the government to move quickly to arrest young people using narcotics.

In Mombasa and Kilindini, there are approximately 40 maskani (meaning "places" in Swahili) where drug abusers meet to share drugs. Bhang smoking has until recently been the drug of choice, but heroin injection is becoming increasingly popular. 70 per cent of drug abusers have admitted that they are using heroin.

In addition to drug abuse, the trafficking of illegal drugs in the country has become a major issue as well. An estimated US$100 million worth is trafficked within the country each year.

=== Poaching ===
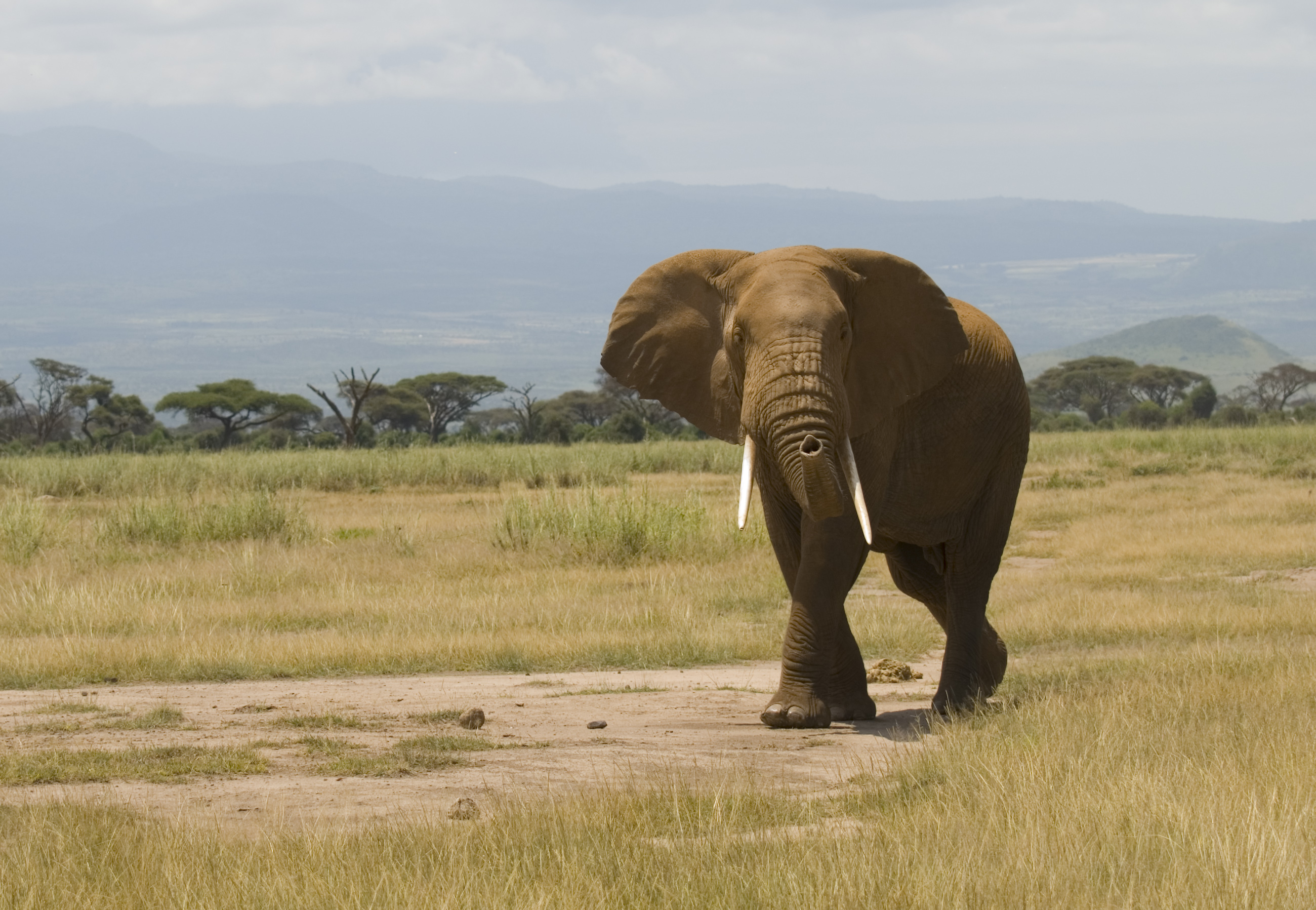
An African elephant in Amboseli National Park, Kenya.

There are a wide variety of wildlife species in Kenya, whose habitats are threatened by encroachment of human development and destruction. In rural Kenya, poachers are one of the main threats to early Kenyan wildlife conservation. Michael Werikhe, also known as Rhino Man, made huge contributions to early Kenyan wildlife conservation. Werikhe walked thousands of kilometres and raised millions of dollars to fund the White Rhino conservation projects. The Blue Wildebeest population is currently abundant, but like other more endangered species, they feel the pressure of habitat reduction. Other wildlife facing threats to poaching and trophy hunting include lions, elephants, gazelles, and rhinos. In February 2020, poachers in Kenya killed two white giraffes. The female white giraffe and her calf were found dead in Garissa County, in the North-East part of the country. There now remains only one male, white giraffe left in the world. Other critically endangered species in Kenya include the Tana River Mangabey, Black Rhino, Hirola, Sable Antelope, and Roan Antelope. These animals have valued meat, hide, or horns/ivory that make them likely to be poached. It is referred to bushmeat trading, which the increase is caused by an increase in population, food insecurity and poverty.

== See also ==
- Cattle raiding in Kenya
- Mungiki
