= Ethnic conflicts in Kenya =

- Map showing the 47 Counties of Kenya
Date	1963-present
Location	Kenya
Status	Ongoing

Ethnic conflicts in Kenya occur frequently, although most are classified as minor skirmishes. A significant increase in the severity of such conflicts between the various ethnic groups inhabiting the country was witnessed after the introduction of multi-party politics in the early 1990s, especially during the 2007–08 Kenyan crisis. Major conflicts have also led to exoduses of ethnic minority communities with roots in other geographical areas.

== Factors ==
Several factors have been identified as the source of outbreaks of communal violence among populations living in close proximity to each other. These include:

- Colonial Policies
- Political Instigation
- Availability of Land
- Access to water and pasture resources
- Loss of traditional grazing land
- Cattle raiding in Kenya
- Lack of alternative sources of livelihood
- Fears of terrorism
- Harassment
- Theft and extortion

== Nationwide conflict ==
The most significant conflict witnessed since Kenya's independence from Britain was the 2007–08 Kenyan crisis, a series of inter-ethnic clashes ignited by the 2007 disputed presidential elections.

By the beginning of 2008, an estimated one third of the 2,200 member Indian community in Kisumu, which controlled most of the city's trade, had begun repatriating back home in the wake of the ethnic clashes. According to community representative Yogesh Dawda, the resident Indians did not trust the Kenyan police's ability to ensure their security.

== Major regional conflict ==
=== Rift Valley Province ===
Since 1992, 5,000 people have been killed and another 75,000 displaced in the Rift Valley Province, with the town of Molo being an epicenter of the violence. The conflict was primarily between the Kalenjin and Kikuyu communities with Land ownership cited as one of key reasons for the conflict.

In 2012, clashes over cattle between the ethnic groups in Samburu District resulted in the deaths of over 40 people including police officers sent to quell the violence.

In March 2017, 13 people were killed and four wounded in Baringo County during a series of cattle rustling.

=== Western Province ===
The year 2005 witnessed an insurgency in the Mount Elgon District of the Western province of Kenya. This was led by the Sabaot Land Defence Force which drew its members from the Sabaot people, who are a sub-tribe of the Kalenjin.

=== Coast Province ===
1997 saw a spate of clashes in the Likoni division of Mombasa District.

In 2012–2013, there was ethnic violence among the Orma and Pokomo group in the Tana River District who have historically fought over grazing, farmland and water.

== Major transregional conflict ==
On 18 November 2012, 10 people were killed and 25 seriously injured when an explosive ripped apart a route 28 mass transit mini-bus (matatu) in Eastleigh. The explosion was believed to have been an improvised explosive device or bomb of some sort. Looting and destruction of Somali-owned homes and shops by angry mobs of young Kenyans ensued. Somalis defended their property, and interpreted the bus explosion as a pretext for non-Somalis to steal from their community.

On 20 November 2012, Kenya Defence Forces swooped Garissa in a military operation. KDF soldiers subsequently burned down the local market and shot at a crowd of protesters, killing a woman and injuring 10 people. Another 35 residents were also receiving treatment at the provincial hospital after being assaulted by the soldiers, including a chief and two pupils. A group of MPs led by Farah Maalim accused Kenyan officers of fomenting violence, raping women and shooting at students, and threatened to take the matter to the International Court of Justice (ICJ) if the perpetrators were not brought to justice.

Maalim also suggested that the deployment of the soldiers was unconstitutional and had not received the requisite parliamentary approval, and that the ensuing rampage cost Garissa entrepreneurs over Sh1.5 billion to Sh2billion in missed revenue. Additionally, Sheikhs with the CPK threatened to sue the military commanders for crimes against humanity committed during the operation. However, general harassment of the Somali community by Kenyan policemen continued, with some officers going as far as invading the homes of Somali businesspeople to steal precious jewellery, foreign currencies, and electronic devices, including expensive phones, laptops and other personal accessories.

By January 2013, a mass exodus of Somali residents was reported. Hundreds of Somali entrepreneurs withdrew between Sh10 to Sh40 billion from their Eastleigh bank accounts, with the intention of reinvesting most of that money back home in Somalia. The collective departures most affected Eastleigh's real estate sector, as landlords struggled to find Kenyans able to afford the high rates of the apartments and shops vacated by the Somalis.

== See also ==
- Demographics of Kenya
- List of massacres in Kenya
- Crime in Kenya
