= Mombasa Mainland Desalination Plant =

Water purification project in Kenya

- Location within Kenya
- Interactive map of Mombasa Mainland Desalination Plant
- Location: Mombasa Mainland, Mombasa County
- Coordinates: 03°57′43″S 39°45′41″E
- Estimated output: 100,000 cubic meters (100,000,000 L) of water daily
- Technology: Sedimentation, Reverse osmosis, Chlorination
- Operation date: January 2021 (Expected)

Mombasa Mainland Desalination Plant (MMDP), is a planned water purification project in Kenya.

== Location ==
The water treatment facility would be located on the mainland of the seaport city of Mombasa, on Kenya's Indian Ocean coast.

== Overview ==
The county of Mombasa lacks a source of potable water, within its boundaries. The fresh water used in the county is sourced from neighboring Kwale County, Kilifi County and Taita Taveta County. The amount of water these sources can provide to Mombasa is less than what the county needs to supply its growing population of people, offices and industries. As of December 2018, the daily freshwater needed was 200,000 cubic meters (200,000,000 L), but prevailing sources could only supply 42,000 cubic meters (42,000,000 L).

== Desalination plants ==
The MMDP is one of four desalination plants planned for construction in Mombasa County, to address the freshwater shortage. MMDP is being developed by Almar Water Solutions, a Spanish company that specializes in the provision solutions to water-related issues, including infrastructure development, design, financing and operation.

MMDP is the first to be developed, with construction planned to start in June 2019 and completion by January 2021.

== Other similar developments ==
Other desalination plants in the pipeline include Mombasa West Desalination Plant, located on the western side of Mombasa mainland, with planned capacity of 100,000 cubic meters (100,000,000 L) daily, to be developed by Almar Water Solutions.

Likoni Major Desalination Plant would be located in Likoni, with planned capacity of 70,000 cubic meters (70,000,000 L) daily, to be developed by Almar Water Solutions.

Likoni Minor Desalination Plant would be located in Likoni as well, with planned capacity of 30,000 cubic meters (30,000,000 L) daily, to be developed by Aqua Swiss, a Swiss water solutions company.

== Construction and cost ==
The budgeted cost of this plant, together with the three other desalination plants in the county, is reported to be KSh16 billion (US$160 million). Almar Water Solutions has signed agreements with the Mombasa County government, to design, finance, build and operate the desalination plant for 25 years after commissioning.

== See also ==
- Desalination plants
