= Robert Lyall-Grant =

Former Chief Justice of Jamaica

Sir Robert William Lyall-Grant (10 September 1875 – 1955) was Chief Justice of Jamaica from August 1932. He had previously been Attorney General of Kenya and a puisne judge of Ceylon.

Lyall-Grant was born the son of John Lyall-Grant in Aberdeen, Scotland and educated at Aberdeen Grammar School and at Aberdeen and Edinburgh Universities, where he studied law as a Vans Dunlop scholar. He was called to the bar in 1903.

After working in practice until 1909 he moved to Africa to take up the post of Attorney General of Nyasaland before serving as a High Court judge there. In July 1920 he was appointed Attorney General of Kenya before being promoted in 1926 to be a Puisne Judge in Ceylon. His final appointment in August 1932 was that of Chief Justice of Jamaica.

He was knighted in the 1934 New Year Honours.

He retired in 1936.
