= Dorcas Oduor =

Kenyan lawyer and politician (born 1965)

9th Attorney General of Kenya
- Incumbent
- Assumed office 20 August 2024
- President: William Ruto
- Preceded by: Justin Muturi

Personal details
- Born: 12 November 1965 (age 60) Nakuru District, Kenya
- Education: University of Nairobi

Dorcas Agik Odhong Oduor (born 12 November 1965) is a Kenyan lawyer who in 2024 became the country's first female Attorney General.

== Early life and education ==
Dorcas Agik Odhong Oduor was born on 12 November 1965 in the Nakuru District. She completed her secondary education at Lwak Girls' High School in 1983.

Oduor completed a law degree in 1990, and a postgraduate diploma at the Kenya School of Law in 1991. She was admitted to the Bar in 1992 as an advocate of the High Court. She also has a Master of Arts in International Conflict Management from the University of Nairobi.

== Career ==
Oduor worked as a lawyer for thirty years, serving in the State Law Office and the Office of the Director of Public Prosecutions. She was the Secretary of Public Prosecutions until 2024.

Oduor has been chairperson of the Board of Review on Mentally Insane (Criminal Psychiatric), Assisting Counsel in the Akiwumi Commission of Inquiry on Land Clashes, the Bosire Commission on the Goldenberg Affair and the Kiruki Commission on the Artur Brothers, Joint Secretary of the Police Reform Commission (Ransley Commission), chair of the board on Criminal Psychiatry (on behalf of the Attorney General), and a member of the National Task Force on Money Laundering and Terrorist Financing.

High-profile cases she has prosecuted include a fraud case against Deputy Chief Justice Philomena Mwilu and a murder case against police officer Edward Kirui from the 2007-2008 post-election violence in Kisumu.

Oduor was conferred the rank of Senior Counsel by President Uhuru Kenyatta on 20 July 2020.

Oduor was nominated by President William Ruto on 30 July 2024, in a Cabinet reshuffle following the removal of the previous Attorney General Justin Muturi over the Kenya Finance Bill protests. She was approved by the Kenyan Parliament on 14 August 2024 and sworn in by Ruto at the State House in Nairobi on 20 August. She said she would reform the criminal justice system by addressing the delays in court cases and providing timely legal advice to the government.

== Awards and honours ==
- Elder of the Burning Spear
- Member of the Order of the Golden Warrior
- Conferment of Rank and Dignity of Senior Counsel

== Publications ==
- Oduor, Dorcas (April 2011). "The Misuse of Technology in the Abuse and Exploitation of Children" (PDF). Twentieth Session of the CCPCJ-Vienna. United Nations Office on Drugs and Crime.
- Oduor, Dorcas (September 2020). "The Road to the Development of Guidelines on Decision to Charge" (PDF). The Prosecutor (III): 14–15.

== Personal life ==
Oduor is a widow and has five children. As part of her vetting process in 2024, she disclosed her family's net worth to be Ksh 85 million (US$833,000).
