= Cattle raiding in Kenya =

Raids occur between Kenya and Ethiopia

- Part of Ethnic conflicts in Kenya
- Map of the 47 Counties of Kenya
Date	1900-present
Location	Kenya
Status	Ongoing

Belligerents
Mixed Farmers	Herders

Casualties and losses
Unknown	Unknown

The northern Kenya region is a very insecure area. For years now, there has been a number of cattle raids going on, terrorising the civilian population and killing hundreds of people.

== History ==
Tensions in this region are long-lasting. For a long time now the Turkana have been armed, and cattle raids have been going on.

Raids occur between Kenya and Ethiopia. The Boranas group has recently been involved in raids involving cattle, according to a BBC article. Over the past year, more and more people from Ethiopia are crossing into Kenya, and violence is a common occurrence in the region.

On July 3, 2005 Kenya government agreed in a meeting to step up efforts to disarm pastoral communities in its northern counties.

Among pastoral communities in north western Kenya, and across the border in South Sudan, bride-wealth has been cited as a major reason why cattle raids continue. In these areas, cattle raids are seen as the only way many young men can acquire the means to marry.

== Recent raids ==
- In April 2003, dozens of people were killed and thousands displaced after an attack by Kenyan cattle raiders in eastern Uganda (BBC).
- On July 12, 2005 61 people died in Kenya from attacks (BBC).
- On July 15, 2005 the BBC reported over 25 deaths over a two-day period when raiders from Uganda ambushed and stole cattle (BBC). Over 2,000 animals are believed to have been stolen in the past month. An army commander said the trouble began when Pian warriors raided cattle from the rival Bokora ethnic group.
- Kenyan security forces say they have shot dead 18 of the cattle raiders.
- On July 31, 2008 raiders shot around 30 herdsmen at Suguta Valley. The herdsmen were chasing raiders, who had earlier stolen their cattle, but the herdsmen ran out of ammunition.
- In August 2009 seven suspected raiders and a 16-year-old herdsboy were killed as raiders attacked the Napoi Enatuny village in Turkana West District.
- In September 2009 at least 31 people died during a raid to Mogurak, Laikipia North District
- On November 10, 2009 ten people died when Samburu cattle raiders attacked the Kisima village in Samburu County.
- In September 2022 at least 11 people died during a raid in Turkana County.

== See also ==
- Ethnic conflicts in Kenya
- Crime in Kenya
