= Michael Werikhe =

Kenyan conservationist

- Born: 25 May 1956; Mombasa, Kenya
- Died: 9 August 1999 (aged 43); Mombasa
- Other name: The Rhino Man
- Occupation: Conservationist
- Known for: Fundraising walks for the Black Rhinoceros

Michael Werikhe (25 May 1956 – 9 August 1999), also known as “the Rhino Man”, was a Kenyan conservationist. He became famous through his long fundraising walks in the African Great Lakes region and overseas. He started his campaign after learning how drastically Black Rhinos had decreased in Africa. Wherever he walked, his arrival was greeted with much public fanfare and media attention. This helped to raise funds for conservation of Rhinos and other endangered African mammals.

== Activism ==
Werikhe's first walk began on December 27, 1982. His walk from his hometown of Mombasa to Nairobi lasted 27 days. In March 1985 he started his first international walk from Kampala to Dar es Salaam, and eventually Mombasa, where he arrived on May 25.

Three years later in 1988, Werikhe walked through several countries in Europe, including Italy, Switzerland and West Germany. His 3000 kilometres walk finished at the entrance stairs of the Natural History Museum in London on September 14, 1988.

Werikhe also visited the United States in 1991, where he held a walk finishing at the San Diego Zoo.

He held two "Rhino walks" in 1993 in Taiwan, a notorious consumer nation of rhino horns.

Although Werikhe typically walked alone, he often had co-walkers and guides with him.

His campaign was supported by Nehemiah Rotich (then chief of the East African Wildlife Society (EAWLS)), Richard Leakey, Juanita Carberry, Prince Philip and Prince Bernhard, among others.

== Private life ==
Michael Sampson Werikhe was born 25 May 1956 in Mombasa, the son of Emanuel Werikhe. He spent his early life in Nairobi with his half-siblings Mary, Susan and David. Under the kind nurturing and guiding influence of Emanual Werikhe's British-born second wife, Sheila Margaret Werikhe (née Lewis), his lifelong interest in conservation issues began.

By the age of 11 Werikhe had an extensive collection of rescued snakes, reptiles and chameleons living in pens at the family's two-bedroom flat in The Westlands residential area of Nairobi. He began his education at Hospital Hill Primary School (in the Parklands district of Nairobi), where his interest in reptiles, even at that age, saw the introduction of pet snakes into the school, as well as ensuring that several of his school friends were taught how to 'foster' some of his reptiles in their old-fashioned school desks (more than one snake was known to have popped its head up through the inkwell-hole during class!!). He went to secondary school at St. Georges High school, Giriama a catholic sponsored school in Mwabaya Nyundo Kaloleni.

Between 1972-1975 Werikhe worked at Fort Jesus, Mombasa. He cataloged the large store of illegally poached elephant ivory and rhinoceros horn. Witnessing the tonnes of poached ivory and rhino horns led Werikhe to begin his fund raising.

Werikhe believed that conservation solutions would only work with the active participation of local residents. Kenyans had always lived alongside wildlife, while the concept of killing animals for sport or poaching for profit were driven by influences beyond Kenya's borders. During the fund raising walk across the African Great Lakes region, Werikhe never carried money but relied on the goodwill of the ordinary Kenyans living in the bush to feed and shelter him. The rural population were Werikhe's initial target group. Rural people aware of what was happening within their local area provided the first line of defence against poachers.

Werikhe died on 9 August 1999 after sustaining injuries in an assault near his home when leaving for work. He was a widower at the time of his death and left two daughters (Acacia and Kora). He was buried at Emmanuel Cemetery, Kisauni, Mombasa. The Michael Werikhe Trust was founded in his memory. In addition, the EAWLS donates an annual Michael Werikhe Award.

== Awards ==
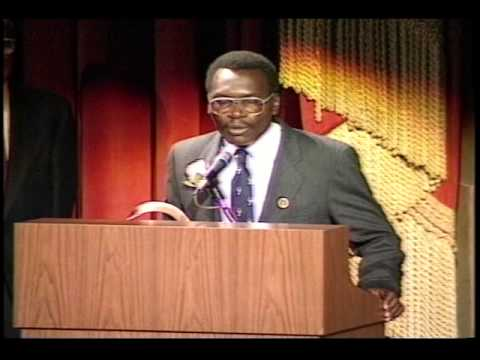
Michael Werikhe

Michael Werikhe won several awards, including global 500 award by UNEP.

- Guinness Stout Effort Award (1983)
- David Sheldrick Memorial Award (1984)
- Boots Action Award (1985)
- EAWLS Conservation Award (1986)
- UNEP Global 500 Award (1989)
- Goldman Environmental Prize (1990)
- Eddie Bauer Heroes of Earth (1991)
- San Diego Zoological Society Conservation Medal (1991)
- African of the Millennium" award by BBC (1999) -posthumous
