= SWARA (magazine) =

East African widlife magazine

SWARA is a quarterly, full-color magazine published by the East African Wild Life Society (EAWLS), a non-profit organization formed in 1956 following the amalgamation of the Wildlife Societies of Kenya and Tanzania, together with people interested in wildlife from Uganda.

== Overview ==
The magazine was started with the name EAWLS Review. Later the name was changed to Africana and in 1978 the magazine was renamed to SWARA. The magazine's current title may have come from the Swahili word swara an alternative for the Swahili word swala meaning gazelle. Its headquarters is in Nairobi.

Registered members of the East African Wildlife Society can subscribe to SWARA in print form or online or both. The website of the online version also offers guidance to writers preparing contributions.

It is the Society's policy to conserve wildlife and its habitat in all its forms as a regional and international resource. The views expressed in the magazine do not always reflect those of EAWLS. The magazine is a forum and as such this is expected.

SWARA welcomes articles and photographs submitted by its readers.
