= Kiruki Commission =

The Kiruki Commission was a Kenyan government commission established to inquire into the scandal of two alleged Armenians widely believed to be con men with high-level connections who briefly commanded attention on the streets of Nairobi in 2006.

== Terms of Reference ==
President Mwai Kibaki established the commission to inquire into various wrongful, criminal or otherwise unlawful acts and omissions by Artur Margaryan, Artur Sargasyan, Arman Damidri, Alexander Tashchi and others.

== Membership ==
The commission's membership consisted of:

- Former Police Commissioner Shadrack Kiruki - Chairman
- Bishop Horace Etemesi - Vice Chairman
- Lawyer Ahmed Issack Hassan

Joint secretaries

- Kennedy Kihara
- Lilian Mahiri

Assisting counsels

- Dorcas Oduor
- Mungai Warui

== Report ==
Eighty-four witnesses testified before the commission. President Mwai Kibaki promised to take action on the report quickly as "Kenyans would like to know about it because the matters that were being investigated were serious."

== Timeline ==
The commission was appointed, 13 June 2006, started sittings on 20 June and ended its sessions on 2 August.

On 28 July 2006 the commission was extended by one month to present its report to the President on or before 31 August 2006 The President received the report on 28 August 2006.

== Cost ==
In response to a query by Joseph Lekuton, on 16 December 2008, Orwa Ojode the Assistant Minister for Provincial Administration and Internal Security confirmed to parliament that the commission had cost the Kenya Government Kshs 19,738,834.40.

== See also ==
- The Standard
