= East African Wildlife Society =

Wildlife conservation society based in East Africa

- Abbreviation: EAWLS
- Predecessor: Kenyan Wildlife Society; Tanzanian Wildlife Society
- Formation: 1956
- Type: Nonprofit organization
- Purpose: Wildlife conservation
- Headquarters: Nairobi, Kenya
- Locations: Kenya; Tanzania; Uganda
- Region served: East Africa
- Services: Conservation membership; Professional partnership; Political engagement; Interaction with local stakeholders
- Main organ: SWARA magazine
- Publication: African Journal of Ecology
- Website: eawildlife.org/index.php

The East African Wildlife Society (EAWLS) is a membership-based non-governmental conservation organization. It was "Established in 1956 through a merger of the Kenyan and Tanzanian wildlife societies and wildlife enthusiasts from Uganda". EAWLS has its headquarters in Nairobi, Kenya but also has an office in Kampala, Uganda. Its operations take place at relevant locations across East Africa. Individual members gain benefits from supporting wildlife conservation across East Africa, as well as access to the Society's magazine SWARA which reports on conservation activities across the region. The cost of individual membership is adjusted according to the country of membership, corporate membership is also available. For example, an article in SWARA lists the Society's bronze level corporate members in 2018.

== Mission ==
The mission of the Society is to promote the conservation and wise use of the environment, especially in the context of wildlife conservation, by advocating rational policies and appropriate resource management regimes, in conjunction with promoting best practice and good governance. This means that the Society works with

- government representatives
- local stakeholders
- other NGOs
- academic researchers

at relevant locations as required across the countries it covers.

Examples are given in the activities section below.

== Activities ==
=== Partnership ===
The East African Wildlife Society works in partnership with other organisations, both in the region in East Africa and further afield. These include in East Africa: the Kenya Wildlife Service; Kenya Forest Service; Maliasili and the West Indian Ocean Congress (WIO-C), (Note: Full name "The Consortium for the Conservation of Coastal and Marine Ecosystems in the Western Indian Ocean", see link to website following.) to name but a few. The EAWLS Society partners webpage gives more examples.

The Society also works in partnership with global wildlife conservation organisations such as BirdLife International, the International Union for Conservation of Nature (IUCN), and Flora and Fauna International.

Partnerships of EAWLS leads to work with other organisations in East Africa that have common aims, for example, with the Kenya Wildlife Service, in seeking to conserve national parks and the wildlife within them. It also results in the Society being invited to conferences bringing together many different parties involved in conservation, in order to contribute to conservation policy development.

That conference involved not just the two NGOs involved in completing the report and EAWLS, but government representatives from the Kenyan Ministry of Environment and Mineral Resources and the Kenya Wildlife Service, as well also international delegates from IUCN and the Japanese Society for the Promotion of Science (JSPS) and participants from other organisations.

=== Marine conservation ===
Wildlife conservation includes marine protected areas, where EAWLS supported Coastal Oceans Research and Development Indian Ocean (CORDIO), the Wildlife Conservation Society and the Nature Conservancy in the development of managed marine areas in Kenyan territorial waters.

EAWLS worked with local stakeholders to change marine protected areas from being centrally-managed at government level to being locally-managed tengefus (tengefu :Swahili to separate) along with the African Fund for Endangered Wildlife (AFEW) and external researchers in order to demonstrate the benefits of these changes.

=== Forestry conservation ===
Another example from Kenya involved collaboration between the Kenyan government, the Critical Ecosystem Partnership Fund (CEPF), (Note: An international investor in biodiversity projects.) as well as EAWLS, the International Centre for Insect Physiology and Ecology (ICIPE), and researchers from the National Museums of Kenya and the universities of Antwerp, Ghent and Helsinki. The involvement of the EAWLS in forestry conservation in this region of Kenya (the Taita Hills) had previously been mentioned in a review of forest conservation projects across Kenya and Zambia.

EAWLS worked with the Tanzanian Natural Resources Forum in reporting on the trade in forest products between Kenya and Tanzania in order to support the FAO Forest Law Enforcement, Governance and Trade Support Programme (Note: Sic. As referred to in the following publication. Do not edit to American English.) for African, Caribbean and Pacific Countries.

=== Visibility of conservation ===
EAWLS works with organisations outside East Africa to make environmental issues in the region more visible. For example, the head of Drusillas Wildlife Park in East Sussex, England, travelled to Kenya in order to learn about the activities of EAWLS so as to be able to discuss them with children visiting his wildlife park.

== Publications ==
EAWLS publishes several publications. SWARA is a wildlife conservation magazine. The African Journal of Ecology is a peer-reviewed academic journal focusing on topics relevant to the Society, published by John Wiley & Sons, Inc. on behalf of the Society. The Society also publishes a bimonthly newsletter distributed by email. In order to make its conservation activities more accessible, the Society makes reports on its activities available through its website.

== Relevance ==
Wildlife conservation in East Africa will continue to be important in the future. The land and water in which wildlife live is shared with an increasing human population which also needs resources. EAWLS membership fees and partnership with other organizations will continue to enable it to contribute to conservation activities.
