= Eric Griffith-Jones =

Sir Eric Newton Griffith-Jones KBE CMG QC (1 November 1913 – 13 February 1979) was a British lawyer and administrator who served as Attorney General of Kenya between 1955 and 1961.

== Early life ==
Griffith-Jones was born in Singapore in 1913 to Oswald Phillips Griffith-Jones and his wife Edith. His paternal aunt was Anne Griffith-Jones. He was educated at Cheltenham College and was called to the bar at Gray's Inn in 1934.

== Career ==
On completing his studies, he joined the Colonial Legal Service and in 1935 began his career as a solicitor and advocate in Straits Settlements and Johor. In 1939 he became Crown Counsel in Singapore. He saw active military service during the Second World War and was a prisoner of war between 1942 and 1945. After the war, he resumed his legal career as a Crown Counsel in the Malayan Union.

In the early 1950s, he moved to Kenya and was made Queen's Counsel in 1954. The following year, he was appointed Attorney-General and Minister for Legal Affairs. He served as Acting Governor in 1962–63. In 1963 he succeeded Sir John Hay as head of Guthrie and oversaw a restructuring of the group. He spent his later years on the board of several companies.

== Death ==
He died on 13 February 1979, at 65.
