= Likoni =

- Location within Kenya
- Coordinates: 4°5′4″S 39°39′40″E
- Country: Kenya
- County: Mombasa County
- Time zone: UTC+3 (EAT)

Likoni /lɪˈkoʊniː/ is a division of Mombasa County, Kenya, and is located to the south-west of Mombasa Island.

== Transport ==
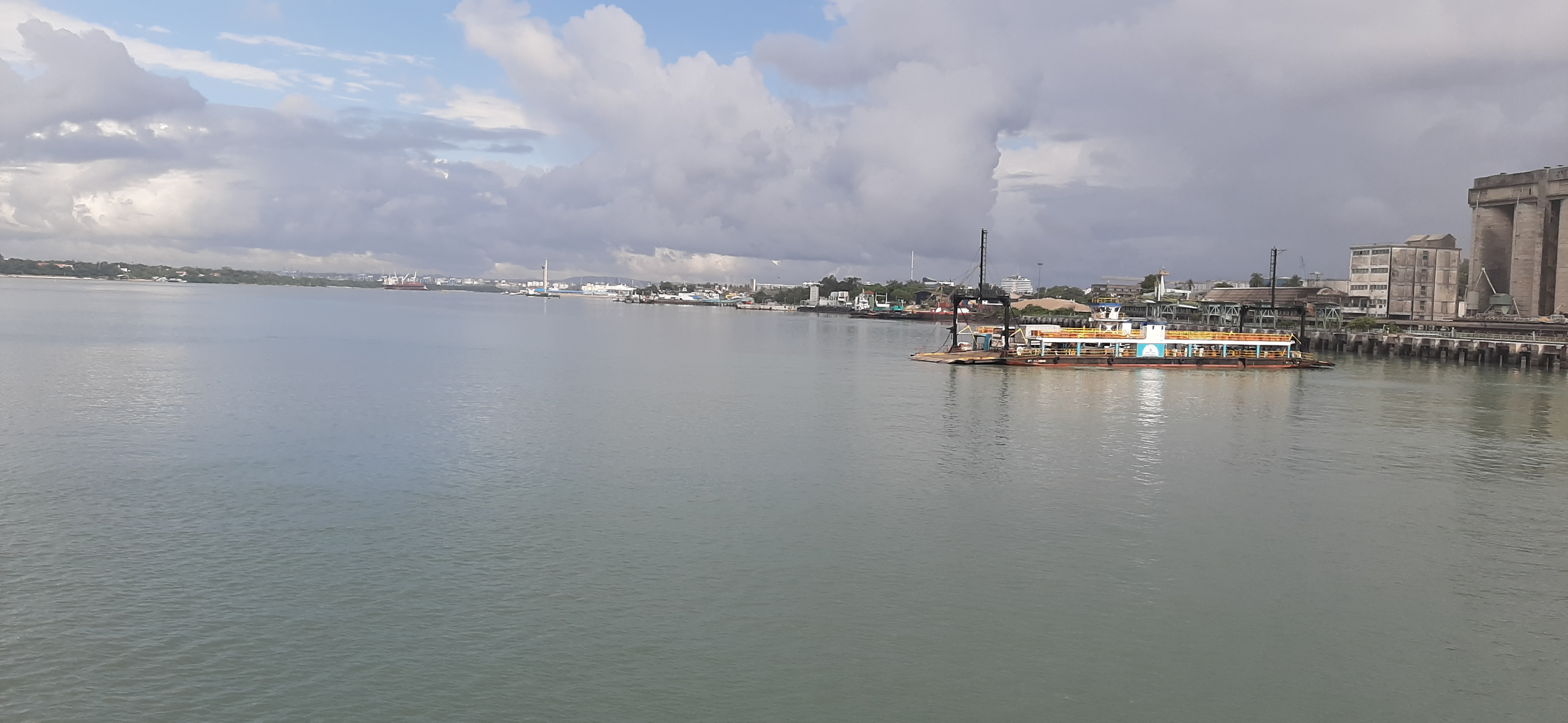
Likoni channel

Likoni is the site of the southern terminus of the Likoni Ferry, a double ended ferry serving road traffic and pedestrians from both Likoni and Mombasa island. Likoni also has a high concentration of Boda-boda services. Matatus bound for the southern districts of Kenya use the Likoni Ferry to cross the Likoni Creek.

== The Likoni Massacres ==
In the autumn of 1997, six policemen were killed when local raiders armed with traditional weapons and guns rampaged through the area. A police station and outpost were destroyed, along with many market stalls and offices. Many non-local Kenyans were either killed or maimed, as the raiders targeted the Luo, Luhya, Kamba and Kikuyu communities. It was estimated that ten police officers and thirty-seven raiders were killed in the clashes based on testimony to the Akiwumi Commission of Inquiry. The remainder of fatalities were in the local community.

== In popular culture ==
In the science fiction video game Halo 2, Likoni is the location of a 26th-century slum known as Old Mombasa. Although the area is heavily built-up with aging offices and apartments constructed centuries prior, the area also exhibits many examples of even older, more traditional Muslim and Portuguese architecture. This is a style modeled after Old Town Makadara on Mombasa Island.
