= African Journal of Ecology =

- Discipline: Ecology, conservation biology
- Language: English
- Edited by: Luca Luiselli

Publication details
- Former name: East African Wildlife Journal
- History: 1963–present
- Publisher: Wiley
- Frequency: 8/year
- Impact factor: 1.1 (2024)

Standard abbreviations
- ISO 4: Afr. J. Ecol.

Indexing
- ISSN: 0141-6707 (print); 1365-2028 (web)
- LCCN: 80646801
- OCLC no.: 937105735

Links
- Journal homepage; Online access; Online archive

The African Journal of Ecology (formerly East African Wildlife Journal) is a peer-reviewed scientific journal covering research on the ecology and conservation of the animals and plants of Africa. It is published 8 times per year by Wiley.

== Abstracting and indexing ==
The journal is abstracted and indexed in:

- Biological Abstracts
- BIOSIS Previews
- CAB Abstracts
- Current Contents/Agriculture, Biology & Environmental Sciences
- EBSCO databases
- GEOBASE
- Index Islamicus
- ProQuest databases
- Science Citation Index Expanded
- Scopus
- The Zoological Record

According to the Journal Citation Reports, the journal has a 2024 impact factor of 1.1.
