= Recreational drug use in Kenya =

In Kenya, drug use is an ongoing prevalent issue among those from both rural and urban areas of the country. Drugs such as inhalants, narcotics, and prescription drugs have been abused, resulting in societal issues such as social stigmas, poverty, peer pressure. These issues have had significant repercussions, including increased violence, strain on healthcare services, heightened vulnerability to HIV infection, and chemical dependence. In response, local communities and the national government have undertaken initiatives to tackle these challenges.

== History ==
The patterns of recreational drug use in Kenya have evolved alongside historical developments. In precolonial times, Kenyan society permitted the consumption of certain substances, such as alcohol, but strictly limited their use to cultural events and specific occasions. The privilege of drug use, including alcohol, was predominantly reserved for male elders within the Kenyan communities, while youth and women were prohibited from participating in such activities. Before the arrival of colonialism, Kenyans engaged in the consumption of various alcoholic beverages, such as chang'aa, and toivo. Additionally, they practice the chewing, smoking, or inhalation of tobacco leaves, khat leaves, and marijuana leaves.

With the expansion of trade during the colonial era, access to alcohol increased significantly. As time passed, the sense of a cohesive social community gradually diminished among Kenyans. The introduction of colonialism brought new economic opportunities, which led to a cultural shift towards individualism. Consequently, the traditional family structure weakened, and the informal restraints on alcohol and drug use became less stringent. In contrast to traditions, contemporary society has witnessed an increase in recreational drug use across various demographics, up to 6.0% by 2017. However, this shift in behavior has also resulted in a higher risk of substance abuse and its associated problems.

== Source of drugs ==
Kenya is classified as a relatively weak, yet independent, state. This classification suggests that the country may lack a centralized and strong government-led military force. Consequently, this creates opportunities for informal actors to engage in illicit activities with limited fear of state intervention. Additional factors, such as widespread governmental corruption, further contribute to the challenges faced by the state. Due to weakened institutions and challenges in maintaining stable financial and transportation services, Kenya has become an attractive destination and transit point for drug traffickers. This vulnerability is highlighted by a report from the United Nations Office on Drugs and Crime (UNODC), which notes the significant quantities of heroin being seized in coastal areas of East Africa. The report further states that a majority of the seized heroin originates from Afghanistan.

The coastal areas of Kenya, including Lamu, Malindi, and Mombasa, are particularly susceptible to drug trafficking due to their proximity to the sea. Traffickers often choose maritime routes as a means of transportation. These areas have been identified as being significantly affected by drug trafficking activities. Drugs are also trafficked through international airports in Kenya.

In Kenya, alcoholic drinks are commonly brewed domestically, with traditional liquor being the most accessible form. However, there is a distinction between rural and urban environments in terms of alcohol production and distribution. In rural areas, it is more common for alcohol to be brewed at home by individuals or small-scale producers. This homemade alcohol often utilizes traditional brewing methods and local ingredients.

== Causes ==
=== Institutionalized homophobia and social stigma ===
Kenya holds a conservative perspective regarding the LGBTQ community, and the country's laws criminalize non-heterosexual sexual activity. This viewpoint is reflected in the Kenyan Penal Code, specifically under Section 162. According to this section, engaging in carnal knowledge of a person against the order of nature is considered a felony and is punishable by up to fourteen years of imprisonment. Section 165 of the Kenyan Penal Code criminalizes homosexual acts, specifying that any male who engages in an act of gross indecency with another male person is guilty of a felony and can face a maximum prison sentence of five years.

Due to the legal institutionalization of homophobia in Kenya, individuals, particularly men who have sex with men (MSM), often face harassment from state officials. A report conducted by the Kenya National Commission on Human Rights highlights the challenges faced by MSMs due to the criminalization of same-sex activities. According to the report, these individuals are subjected to frequent harassment, extortion attempts, and false arrests by law enforcement officers and state officials.

According to a study conducted in 2017 among men who have sex with men (MSM) in Kisumu, Kenya, the prevalence of severe depressive symptoms was found to be significantly higher (11.4%) compared to the estimated 4% in the general Kenyan population. Additionally, the study revealed that 50.1% of the participants reported harmful alcohol abuse, while 23.8% reported moderate substance abuse. These findings suggest that MSM in Kisumu may resort to alcohol and illicit substances as a coping mechanism within the conservative social environment they navigate.

In recent years, there have been efforts by LGBTQ activists and allies in Kenya to advocate for the decriminalization of same-sex sexual activity.

=== Peer pressure ===
Peer pressure is indeed a significant factor contributing to drug abuse among youths, including female Kenyan youths. A study published in the Bangladesh e-Journal of Sociology highlighted the risk of drug abuse among female youth in Mikindu, Kenya. The study found that approximately 24.14% of participants reported initiating drug use due to peer pressure. In some cases, individuals are influenced by their peers who may promote the perceived benefits or positive feelings associated with drug use. This can create a sense of curiosity or a desire to fit in with their social circle and please their friends or a sense to show equality and sometimes superiority, leading to experimentation and ultimately drug abuse.

== Effects ==
=== Violence ===
Violence within the private or domestic sphere is a concerning issue, and substance abuse can contribute to increased aggression and risk of harm. A study published in the Journal of Youth Studies shed light on the influence of substance use on sexual violence among male youth and the victimization of girls. The 2012 report compiled by the National Authority for the Campaign Against Alcohol and Drug Abuse found that those who used alcohol and bhang were more likely to exhibit violent behavior toward family members. For example, "32.4% of alcohol and 28.6% of bhang users reported being violent to a spouse/partner or a family member."

=== Utilization of healthcare services ===
Kenyan women who actively engage in drug-injecting can jeopardize their health and the health of their fetuses during pregnancies. Drug injecting can lead to amenorrhea, resulting in women being unaware that they are even pregnant until further along. This lack of awareness resulted in pregnant women failing to follow certain practices and habits to ensure the health of their fetuses.

Drug use also creates a dilemma for women as they weigh the choices of either searching for more drugs or traveling to clinics to receive better care. Women under the influence of drugs feel a need to satisfy their cravings, viewing them as a priority before attending medical appointments. They also consider the possibility that staying at a clinic for a long duration due to long queues can lead to withdrawal symptoms.

For the time being, few health providers fully understand how to treat women who have been injected with drugs.

=== Greater risk of HIV ===
One of the more long-term effects brought about by drug use in Kenya is the transmission of HIV among the populace. Under the effects of drugs, those who engage in sexual activities are more likely to make rash and impulsive decisions. Research on women's drug usage in the coastal cities of Mombasa and Kilifi found that the sharing of needles among drug users was common. However, despite understanding the risks attached to such behavior, participants continued to share needles.

Drug use can aid the spread of HIV through transactional relationships. In terms of the makeup of study participants, "53% were single and 27% were cohabiting," leading to conditions by which women exchanged sex for "drugs, protection from the police, and accommodation." A search for drugs, in particular, poses certain health risks, as sexual intercourse with strangers serves to heighten the risk of contracting HIV. Similarly, sex workers are susceptible to contracting HIV due to drug use during work.

=== Chemical dependence ===
Chemical dependence refers to various indicators such as needing the substance to live or go about one's day and "craving for the substance, needing the substance first thing in the morning"; concern by someone close to the respondent or a doctor about the person's drug consumption habits. The report indicated that between the age range of 15 to 65, tobacco was the most addictive substance with 62.3% of users expressing a craving for it. 21%, 44%, and 34.4% of alcohol, bhang and miraa users respectively, expressed similar cravings.

=== Social stigma ===
A report published by the Harm Reduction Journal examined the impact of stigma faced by women on the Kenyan Coast who injected drugs. Based on the information collected from interviews with study participants who had injected drugs, the researchers formed several conclusions about stigma. The types of stigma included:

- Self-Stigmatization: Participants reported internal feelings of shame and low self-esteem due to having injected drugs coupled with a lack of sense of worth. They also associated their actions with a negative label known as "teja" which means "an injecting drug user."
- External Stigmatization: Participants also reported feeling excluded by those around them. Some noted that their families expressed apathy towards them for having used drugs. There were also instances in which the stigma attached to drug use led to drug users being perceived as petty criminals. The role of gender also arose as the stigma of drug use among women was accentuated by the fact that traditionally, men were drug users.

According to the study, the stigma of drug use can impede women's access to healthcare. Some women shared their concerns that being identified as a drug user would influence the quality of their interactions with healthcare workers, as certain workers would question the reason and method by which they should provide for the drug users. Some also opted to hide their identities to ensure that they would receive proper care.

== Local response ==
The local community plays a role in regulating the consumption of alcohol and other drugs. According to interviews with members of Kuikui, Baringo North, there is general respect and concern within the community for the well-being of others. If, for example, a youth is caught drinking alcohol or using drugs, the word of a village elder can be sufficient for the youth to cease his or her behavior. The family is also capable of guiding relatives or immediate family members away from alcohol and other drugs.

== Government response ==
Aware of the negative effects of alcoholism and other drug abuse, the Kenyan government has made an active effort in recent years towards informing and preventing the populace from abusing these substances through policy. The Tobacco Control Act of 2007 was designed to protect individuals from disease and death caused by tobacco. It also aimed to better inform consumers on the risks associated with smoking, while preventing those under the age of 18 from purchasing tobacco products. In 2010, The Alcoholic Drinks Control Act was passed to protect "the health of individuals by providing a legal framework to control sale, production & consumption of alcoholic drinks." It also sought to better educate the general populace about the risks of alcohol consumption. These efforts regulate the hours of operation for bars and prohibit the sale of alcohol to individuals under 18 years of age. These rules, however, are frequently broken as customers will pay bribes or bar owners will refuse to adhere to the rules, as they may diminish profits.

The Kenyan government has also cooperated with UNODC and the United Nations Programme on HIV/AIDS (UNAIDS) in its effort to provide proper treatment to those who inject drugs. In Mombasa, the Kenyan government began a process of decentralization, creating 12 outpatient centers capable of providing drug-dependence treatment. UNODC also pledged to provide training for "700 health professionals and civil society workers in HIV services" for those who inject drugs.

== See also ==
- Cannabis in Kenya
