= Attorney General of Kenya =

Head of Kenyan State Law Office

- Incumbent; Dorcas Oduor since 20 August 2024
- Office of the Attorney General
- Style: The Honorable (formal); Attorney General (informal)
- Type: Judiciary of Kenya
- Member of: Cabinet of Kenya
- Residence: Nairobi, Kenya
- Nominator: President of Kenya
- Appointer: The president
- Term length: No fixed term
- Formation: March 1, 1906; 120 years ago
- First holder: Alfred Kerney Young
- Deputy: Solicitor General of Kenya
- Website: www.attorneygeneral.gov.ke

The Attorney General of Kenya is the head of the Kenyan State Law Office, the principal legal adviser to the government of Kenya, and a member of the Cabinet. Dorcas Agik Oduor is the current and first woman Attorney-General of Kenya.

== History ==
The Office of the Attorney General draws its mandate from Article 156 of the 2010 Constitution of Kenya, which vests in the Attorney General the responsibility of being the principal legal adviser to the government to ensure that the rule of law is promoted, protected and upheld, and defend the public interest. The Office of the Attorney General Act No. 49 of 2012 spells out the functions of the office, which include:

1. Advising Government Ministries, Departments, Constitutional Commissions and State Corporations on legislative and other legal matters;
2. Negotiating, drafting, vetting and interpreting local and international documents, agreements and treaties for and on behalf of the Government and its agencies; and
3. Performing any function as may be necessary for the effective discharge of the duties and the exercise of the powers of the Attorney-General.

== Duties ==
The attorney general's duties include the formulation of legal policy and ensuring proper administration of Kenya's legal system, including professional legal education. Assisting the Attorney General in the performance of his duties as principal legal adviser to the government are:

- Solicitor General
- Senior Deputy Solicitor General
- Director of Public Prosecutions
- Registrar General
- Administrator General
- Chairman of Advocates Complaints Commission
- Chief Parliamentary Counsel
- Chief State Counsel

== Attorneys General of East Africa Protectorate (1895–1920) ==
- Alfred Karney Young (1895–1909)
- Ralph Molyneux Combe (1909–1914)
- Sir Jacob William Barth (1914–1918)
- Ivan Llewelyn Owen Gower (1918, acting)
- Robert William Lyall-Grant (1918–1920)

== Attorneys General of British Kenya (1920–1963) ==
- Robert William Lyall-Grant (1920–1925)
- Ivan Llewelyn Owen Gower (1925–1926) (acting)
- Sir Walter Huggard (1926–1929)
- Sir Alisdair Duncan Atholl MacGregor (1929–1934)
- Walter Harragin (1933–1941)
- Sir Stafford William Powell Foster-Sutton (1944–1948)
- Sir Kenneth O'Connor (1948– )
- Sir John Whyatt (1951–1955)
- Sir Eric Newton Griffiths-Jones (1955– )
- Diarmaid William Conroy ( –1960) (acting)
- Sir Eric Newton Griffiths-Jones (1960–1963)

== Attorneys General of Kenya (since 1963) ==
- Charles Mugane Njonjo (1963–1979)
- James B. Karugu (1980–1981)
- Joseph Kamere (1981–1983)
- Matthew Guy Muli (1983–1991)
- Amos Wako (1991–2011)
- Githu Muigai (2011–2018)
- Paul Kihara Kariuki (2018–2022)
- Justin Muturi (2022–2024)
- Dorcas Oduor (2024-)
