= List of airports in Somalia =

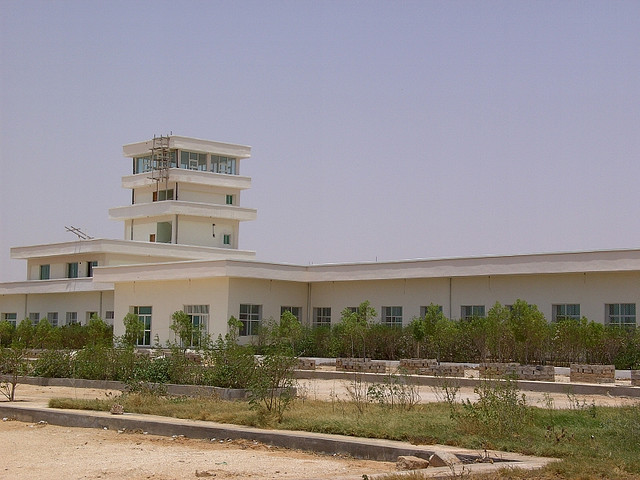
Bosaso Airport in Bosaso.

This is a list of airports in Somalia, sorted by location. As of 2012, Somalia has 62 airports, 7 of these have paved runways. Among the latter, four have runways of over 3,047 m; two between 2,438 m and 3,047 m; and one 1,524 m to 2,437 m long.

There are 55 airports with unpaved landing areas. One has a runway of over 3,047 m; four are between 2,438 m to 3,047 m in length; twenty are 1,524 m to 2,437 m; twenty-four are 914 m to 1,523 m; and six are under 914 m.

== Airports ==
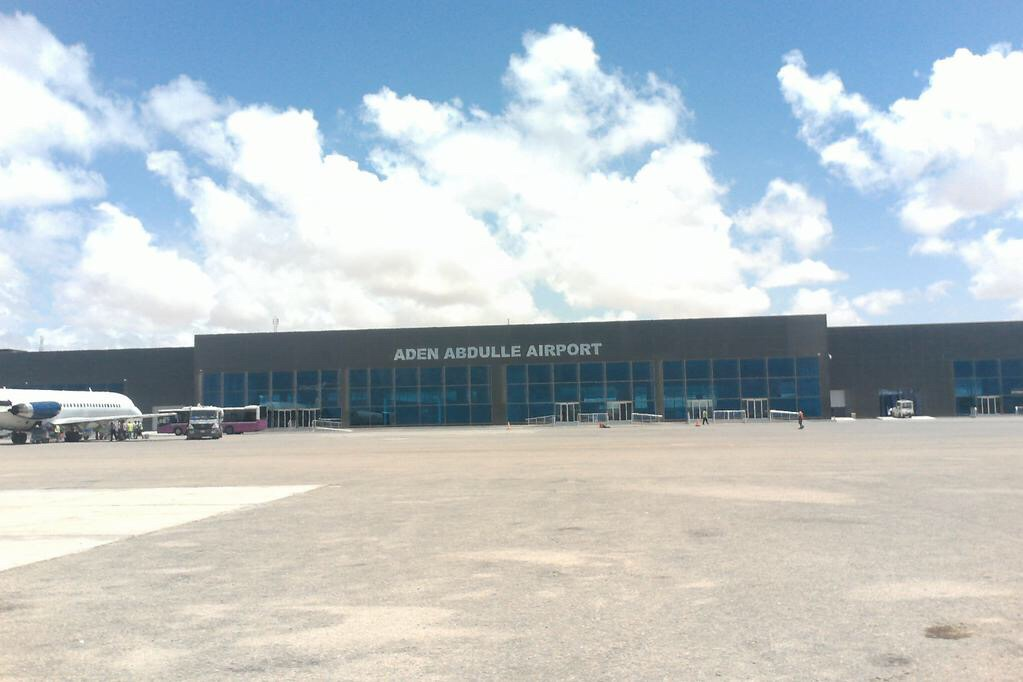
Aden Adde International Airport in Mogadishu.

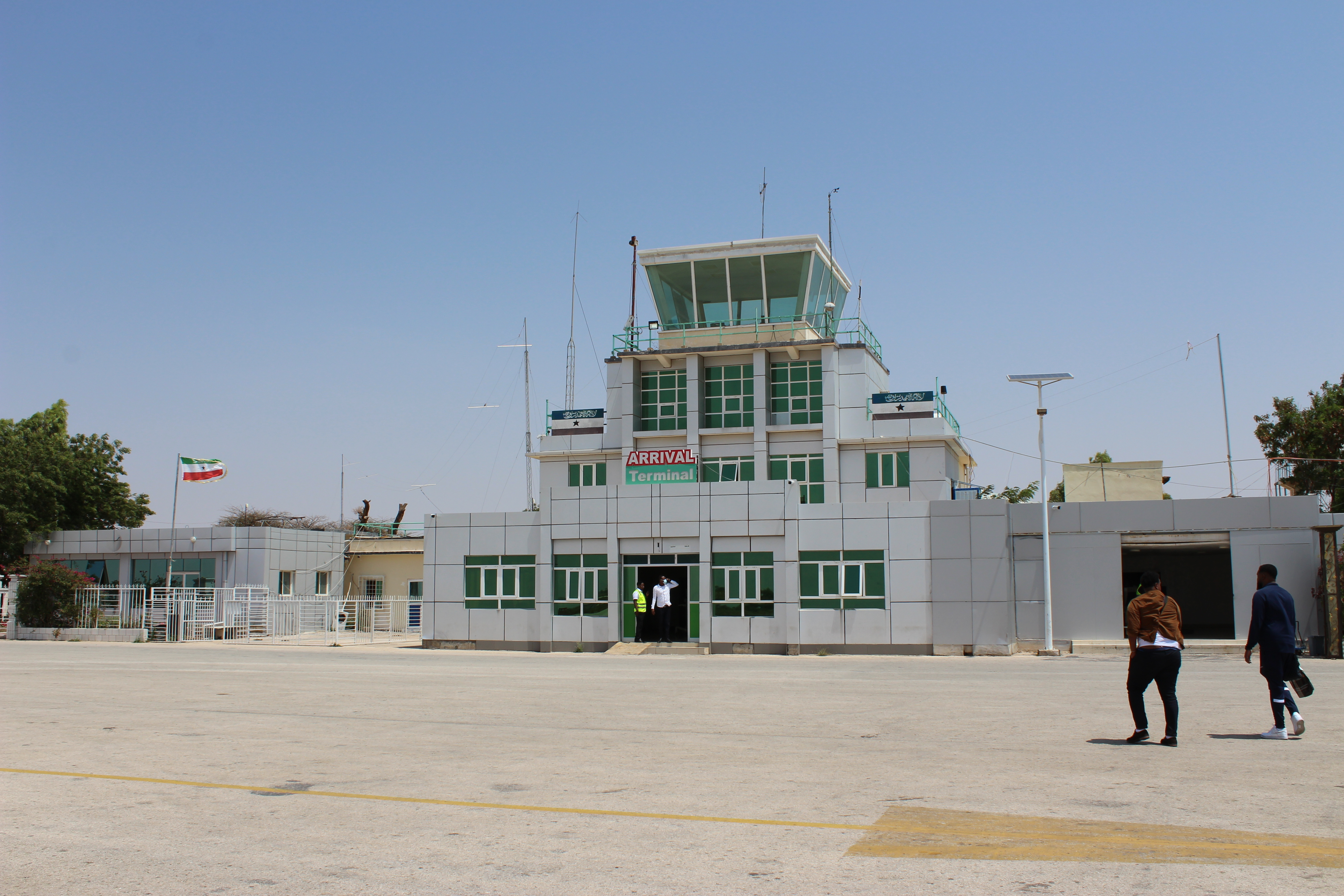
Egal International Airport in Hargeisa.

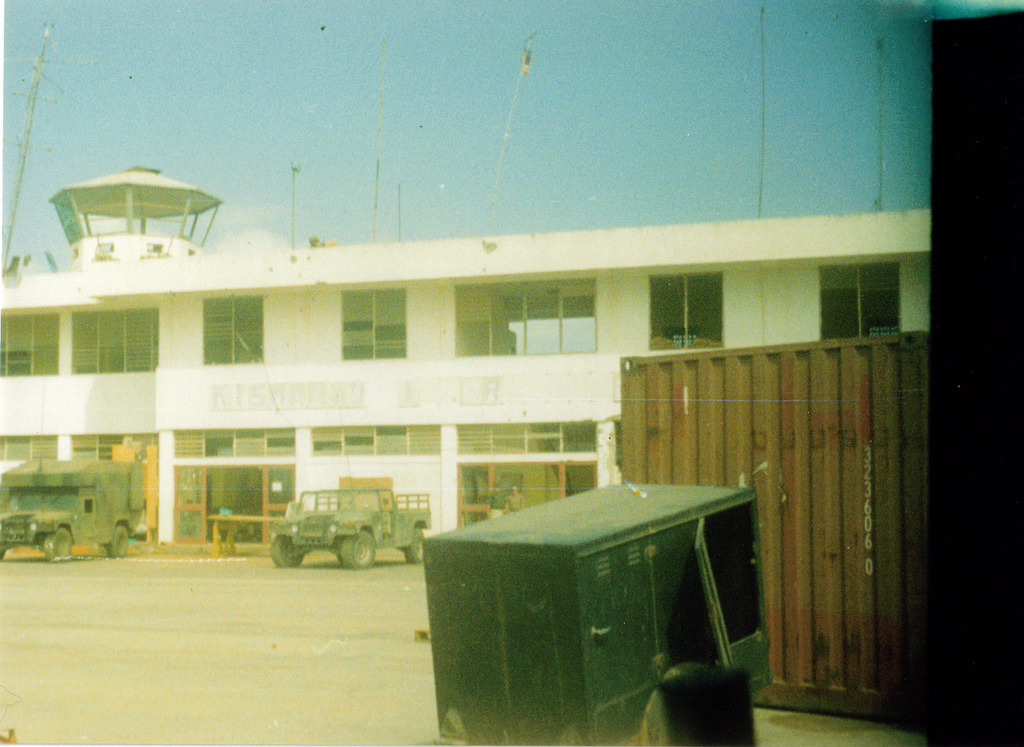
Kismayo Airport in Kismayo.

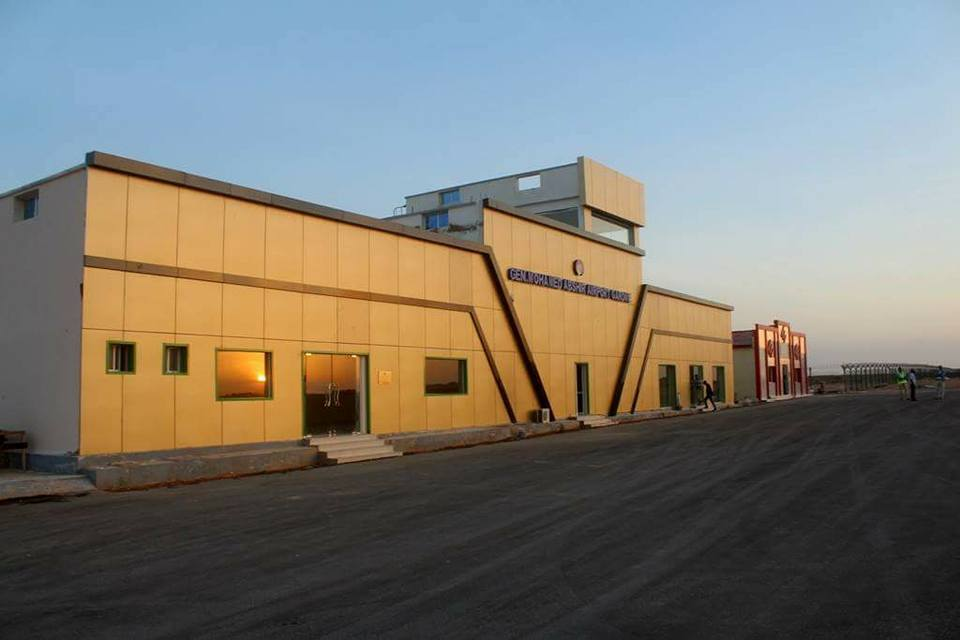
Garowe, International Airport

Airport names shown in Bold have scheduled passenger service on commercial airlines.

Location served	Region	ICAO	IATA	Airport name	Notes
Abudwak (Caabudwaaq)	Galguduud			Abudwak Airport (Caabudwaaq Airport)	
Adado (Cadaado)	Galguduud	HCAD	AAD	**Adado Airport** (Cadaado Airport)	
Baledogle (wanlaweyn)	Shabeellaha Hoose			Baledogle Airport	
Baidoa (Baydhabo)	Bay	HCMB	BIB	**Baidoa Airport**	
Bardera (Baardheere)	Gedo	HCMD	BSY	Bardera Airport	
Barawe (Baraawe)	Shabeellaha Hoose	HCBW	BRW	**Baraawe Airport**	
Beledweyne (Belet Uen, Beletweeyne)	Hiran	HCMN		Beledweyne Airport	
Bosaso (Boosaaso) Puntland	Bari	HCMF	BSA	**Bosaso Airport**	
Jowhar (Jowhar) Hirshabelle	Hirshabelle	HCMC	CXN	Jowhar Airport (Jowhar Airport)	
Dhusamareb (Dhuusamareeb)	Galgaduud			Dhusamareb Airport (Ugas Nur Airport)	
Rage Ele (Rage Ele)	Hirshabelle			Rage Ele Airport	
Eyl (Eil) Puntland	Nugal	HCME	HCM	Eyl Airport (Eil Airport)	
Galkayo (Galcaio, Gaalkacyo) Puntland	Mudug	HCMR	GLK	**Abdullahi Yusuf Airport**	
Garbaharey (Garba Harre, Garbahaareey)	Gedo		GBM	Garbaharey Airport	
Garoowe (Garowe) Puntland	Nugaal	HCGR	GGR	**Garowe Airport**	
Guri'el (Guriel)	Galgaduud			**Guriel Airport**	
Bal'd (Balcad)	Shabeelada Dhexe	HCMS	CMS	Bal'd Airport (Balad Airport)	
Kismayo (Kisimayu, Kismaayo)	Jubada Dhexe	HCMK	KMU	**Kismayo Airport** (Kisimayu Airport)	
Luuq (Lugh)	Gedo	HCMJ	LGX	Lugh Ganane Airport	
Mogadishu (Muqdisho)	Banaadir	HCMM	MGQ	**Aden Adde International Airport**	
Jubaland (Dhobley)	Jubada Dhexe	HCDB		Dhobley Airport	
Obbia (Hobyo, Hobyaa)	Mudug	HCMO	CMO	Obbia Airport (Hobyo Airport)	
Mareeg (Mareg)	Galguduud	HCMG	GSR	Mareg Airport (Mareg Airport)	

== See also ==
- Somali Air Force
- Transport in Somalia
- List of airports by ICAO code
