= Garowe Airport =

Airport in Somalia

Garowe International Airport General Mohamed Abshir International Airport Gegada Diyaaradaha Caalamiga ah ee Garoowe Gegada Caalamiga ee Jeneraal Maxamed Abshir
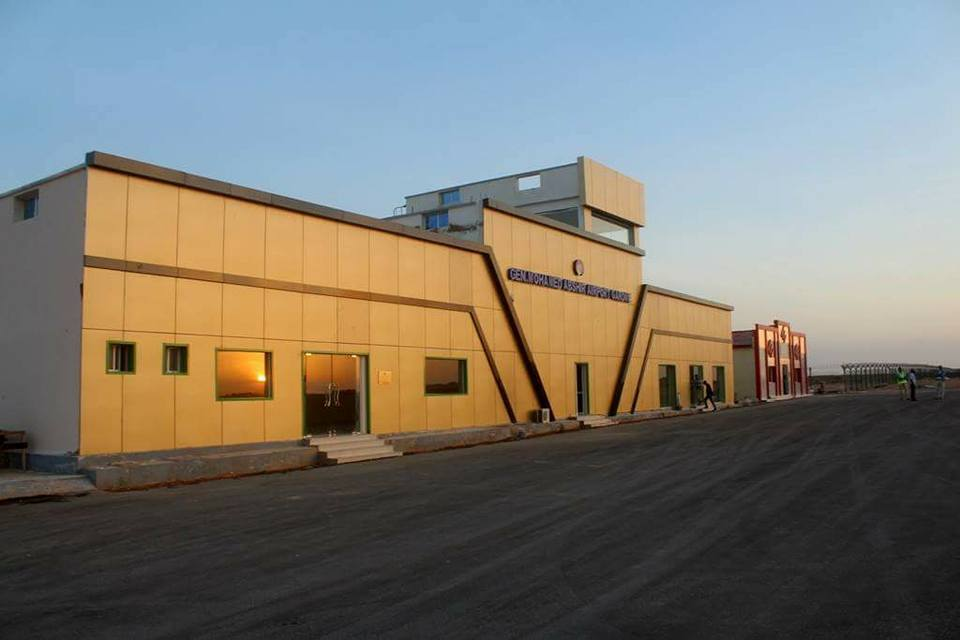
- IATA: GGR; ICAO: HCMW

Summary
- Airport type: Public
- Owner: Puntland Ministry for Civil Aviation and Airports
- Serves: Garowe
- Hub for: Mudug; Sool; Karkaar; Sanaag; Haylan
- Coordinates: 08°27′39″N 048°34′20″E

Map
- Location of the airport in Somalia

Runways
Direction	Length		Surface
Direction	m	ft	Surface
06/24	2,000	6,562	Asphalt
- Sources: World Aero Data

General Mohamed Abshir International Airport (IATA: GGR, ICAO: HCGR) is an airport serving Garowe, the administrative capital of the autonomous Puntland region in northeastern Somalia.

== Overview ==
Also known as Garowe Airport, it is situated about 12 km from the Garowe city center. It was officially opened in 2010 under the aegis of Puntland's Ministry for Civil Aviation and Airports. The first phase of the airport's construction was completed in seven years through a public-private partnership, with the Garowe-based Mubarak construction company having assisted significantly in completing the project. The airport also attempts to adhere to the air transport standards established by the International Civil Aviation Organization (ICAO).

Through its representative to Kuwait, Faisal Hawar, the Puntland government signed an agreement in Dubai with a Kuwaiti company for the development of facilities at the Garowe International Airport as well as Maakhir University. The deal was valued at US$10 million and was financed by the Kuwait Fund for Arab Economic Development (KFAED). In October 2013, Puntland Minister of Finance Farah Ali Jama and KFAED Deputy Director Hamad Al-Omar signed a follow-up Grant Agreement in Kuwait. The pact will see the fund extend $10 million, of which $6 million will be allocated to finance the Garowe Airport Project and the remainder will be earmarked for the Maakhir University Project.

The project consists of paving a new runway around 2,200 meters in length and 45 meters in width, with shoulders of about 65 meters on each side. It also includes a passenger terminal building of an area of 1,000 meters consisting of two floors to accommodate 120 passengers, a control tower with a height of 25 meters, an alley perpendicular to the runway with a width of 50 meters, an apron area with a width of 100 meters and length of 200 meters, a lighting system, drainage system, firefighting station, a 2.5-meter fence, and safety equipment. Additionally, the deal entails consulting and engineering services for design and supervision of work construction.

After being inaugurated, the airport was officially renamed General Mohamed Abshir in memory of the late Maj. General Mohamed Abshir Muse, the first chief of Somali police, who was from Garowe.

== Airlines and destinations ==
Airlines	Destinations
African Express Airways	Bosaso, Mogadishu, Nairobi–Jomo Kenyatta
Daallo Airlines	Dubai–International, Mogadishu
Ethiopian Airlines	Addis Ababa
Jubba Airways	Bosaso, Galkayo, Hargeisa, Mogadishu
Dalmar Air	Hargeisa
Freedom Air Express	Abudwak, Adado, Baidoa, Beledweyne, Bosaso, Dusmareb, Galkayo, Mogadishu, Guriel, Hargeisa, Kismayo, Nairobi–Jomo Kenyatta

== Accidents and incidents ==
- On December 2, 2020, an Air Djibouti Boeing 737-500 suffered a main landing gear collapse on landing,

== See also ==
- List of airports in Somalia
