= Transport in Somalia =

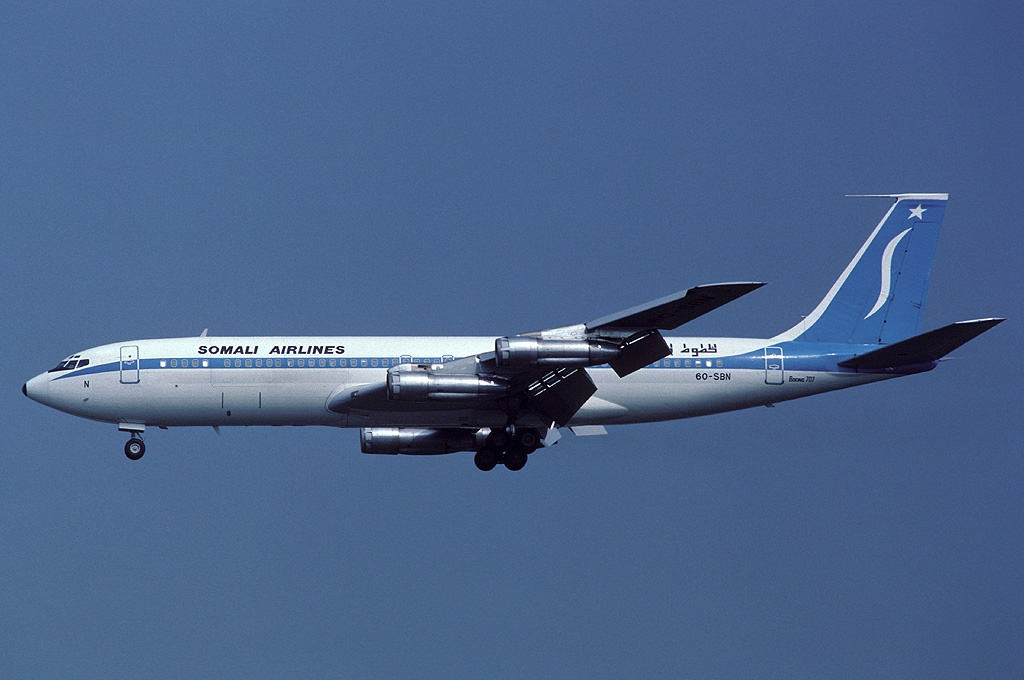
Somali Airlines Boeing 707-338C in flight in 1984

Transport in Somalia refers to the transportation networks and modes of transport in effect in Somalia. They include highways, airports and seaports, in addition to various forms of public and private vehicular, maritime and aerial transportation.

== Roads ==
Somalia's network of roads is 21,830 km long. As of 2010, 2,757 km (12%) of streets are paved, 844 km (3.9%) are gravel, and 18,229 km (83.5%) are earth. 2,559 km are primary roads, 4,850 km are secondary roads, and 14,421 km are rural/feeder roads. As of May 2015, over 70,000 vehicles are registered with the Puntland Ministry of Works and Transport.

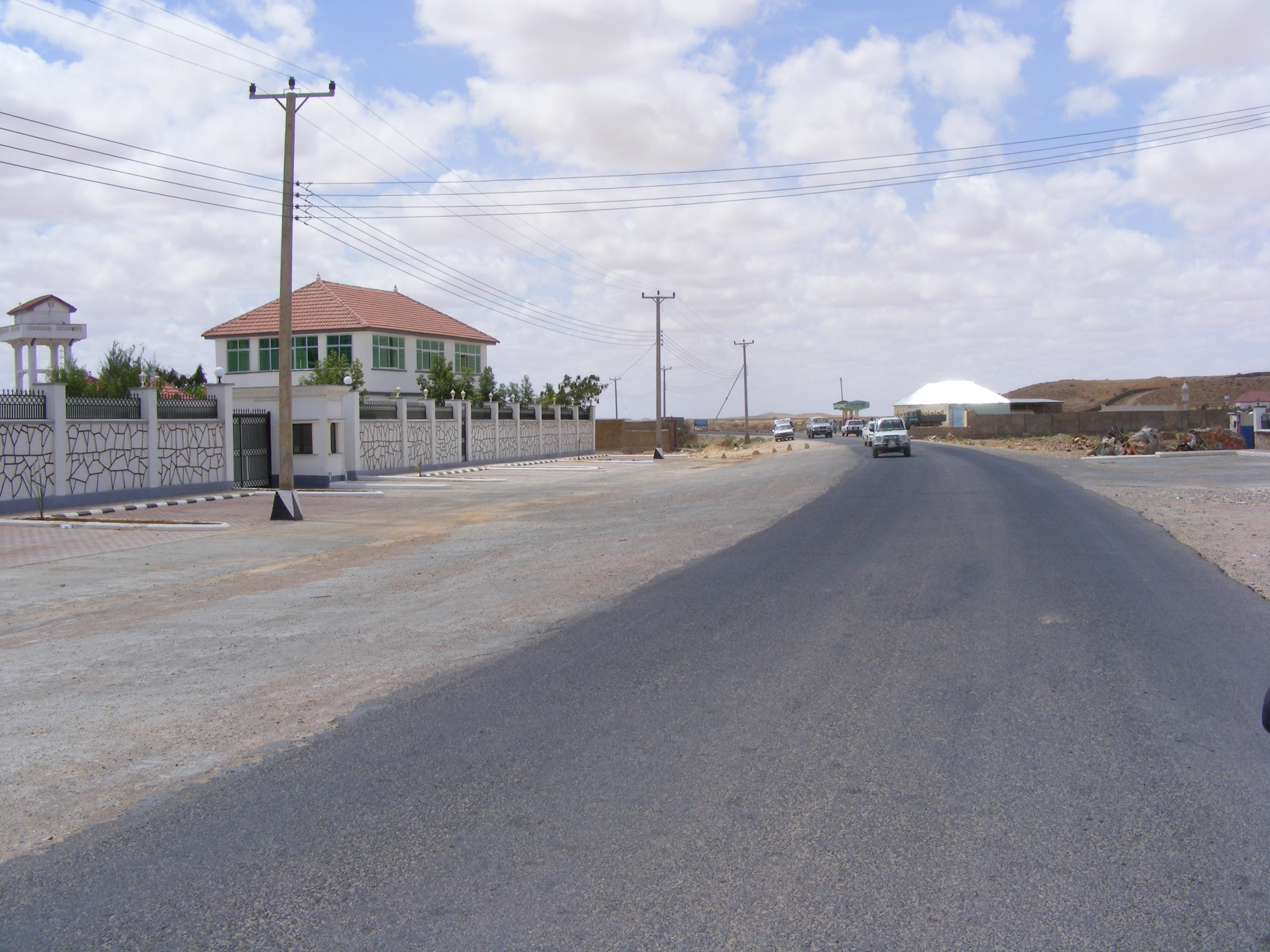
Roadside view of a neighborhood in Garowe

A 750 km highway connects major cities in the northern part of the country, such as Bosaso, Galkayo Garowe And Laascaanood, with towns in the south. In 2012, the Puntland Highway Authority (PHA) completed rehabilitation work on the central artery linking Garowe with Galkayo. The transportation body also began an upgrade and repair project in June 2012 on the large Garowe–Bosaso Highway. Additionally, renovations were initiated in October 2012 on the central artery linking Bosaso with Qardho. Plans are also in the works to construct new roads connecting littoral towns in the region to the main thoroughfare.

In September 2013, the Somali federal government signed an official cooperation agreement with its Chinese counterpart in Mogadishu as part of a five-year national recovery plan. The pact will see the Chinese authorities reconstruct several major infrastructural landmarks in the Somali capital and elsewhere, as well as the road between Galkayo and Burao in the northern part of the country.

In June 2014, the Puntland administration inaugurated a new 5.9 km paved road in the city. The construction project leads to the Bosaso seaport, and was completed in conjunction with UNHABITAT. The Puntland government plans to invest at least 23 million Euros in contributions from international partners in similar road infrastructure development initiatives.

In October 2014, the Puntland Highway Authority began construction on a new highway connecting the presidential palace in Garowe with various other parts of the administrative capital. Financing for the project was provided by the Puntland government. Puntland Minister of Public Works Mohamed Hersi said that the Puntland authorities plan to build and repair other roads linking to the regional urban centers. In December 2014, Galkayo District Mayor Yacqub Mohamed Abdalla and other Puntland officials likewise laid the foundation for a new tarmac road in western Galkayo. The project was funded by the Puntland administration, with other roads in the broader district also slated to be paved with bitumen in 2015. Among the latter streets, a tar construction project began on the Durdur road in the Garsor suburb in February 2015. The main road in the Central Business District as well as the airport road are concurrently scheduled to be paved.

In November 2014, the Ministry of Interior and Federalism reached an agreement with the government of Qatar to assist in the renovation of existing roads in Somalia and the construction of new streets.

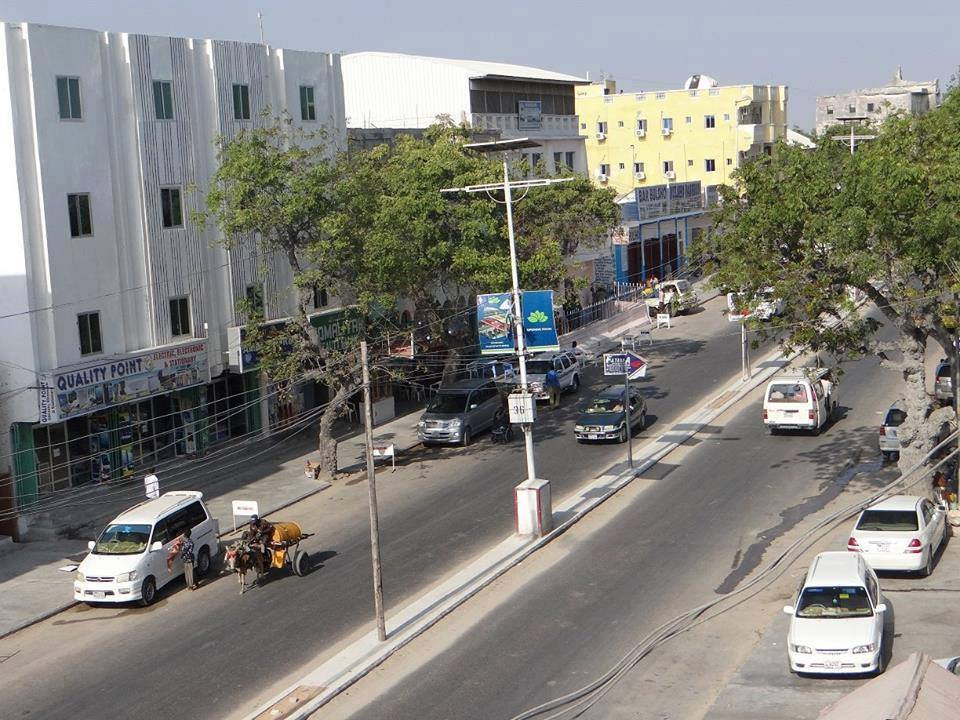
Newly constructed roads and buildings in Mogadishu

In January 2015, the Interim Juba Administration launched a beautification and cleaning campaign in Kismayo's transportation system. Part of a broader urbanization drive, the initiative includes the clearing of clogged streets and lanes, razing of illegal buildings therein, and further development of the municipal road network.

In March 2015, Puntland President Abdiweli Mohamed Ali in conjunction with EU Ambassador to Somalia Michele Cervone d'Urso and German Ambassador to Somalia Andreas Peschke launched the Sustainable Road Maintenance Project. Part of the New Deal Compact for Somalia, the initiative's implementation is facilitated by 17.75 million Euros and 3 million Euros provided by the EU and Deutsche Gesellschaft für Internationale Zusammenarbeit (GIZ), respectively. Among other objectives, the project aims to renovate the highway between Galkayo and Garowe, including funding refurbishments on the damaged segments of the road and construction of check dams and flood control structures. The initiative also involves a routine annual maintenance program, which focuses on side brushing, clearing bridges after floods, drainage and culvert clearance, and pothole filling. Additionally, the project will offer policy support to the Puntland Ministry of Public Works and the Puntland Highway Authority, and local contractors will receive on-the-job training to upgrade their skills.

== Air ==
=== Airports ===
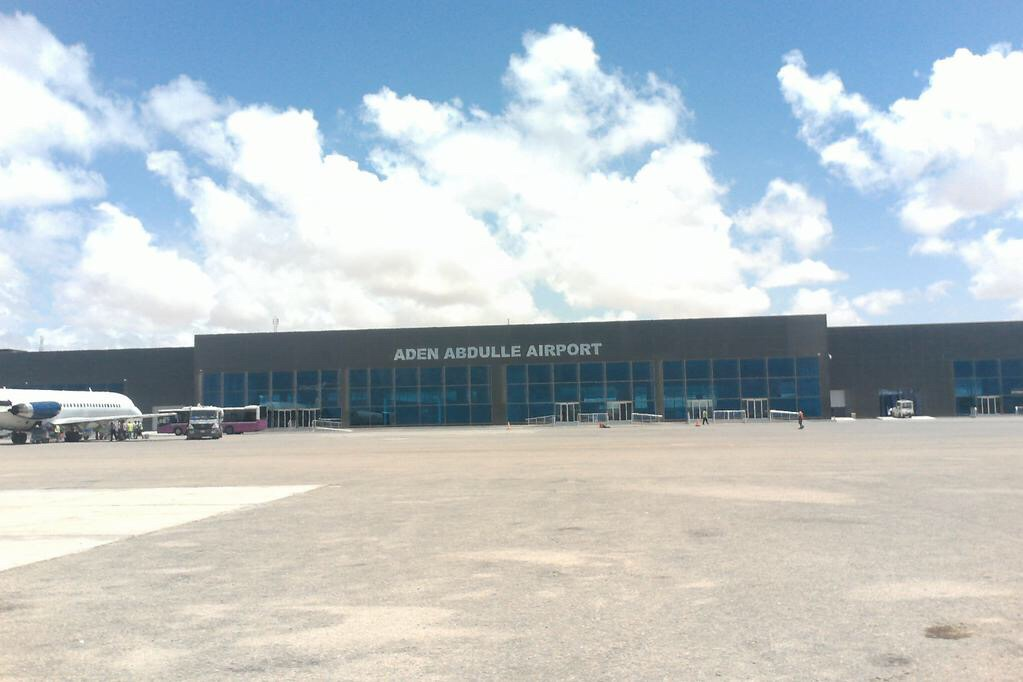
The Aden Adde International Airport

The Somali Civil Aviation Authority (SOMCAA) is Somalia's national civil aviation authority body. Based at Aden Abdulle International Airport in Mogadishu, it is under the aegis of the federal Ministry of Air and Land Transport. In 2012, the ministry along with the Somali Civil Aviation Steering Committee set a three-year window for reconstruction of the national civil aviation capacity. After a long period of management by the Civil Aviation Caretaker Authority for Somalia (CACAS), SCAMA in conjunction with the International Civil Aviation Organization also finalized a process in December 2014 to transfer control of Somalia's airspace to the new Air Space Management Centre in the capital.

As of 2012, Somalia had 61 airports according to the CIA factfile. Seven of these have paved runways. Among the latter, four have runways of over 3,047 m; two between 2,438 m and 3,047 m; and one 1,524 m to 2,437 m long.

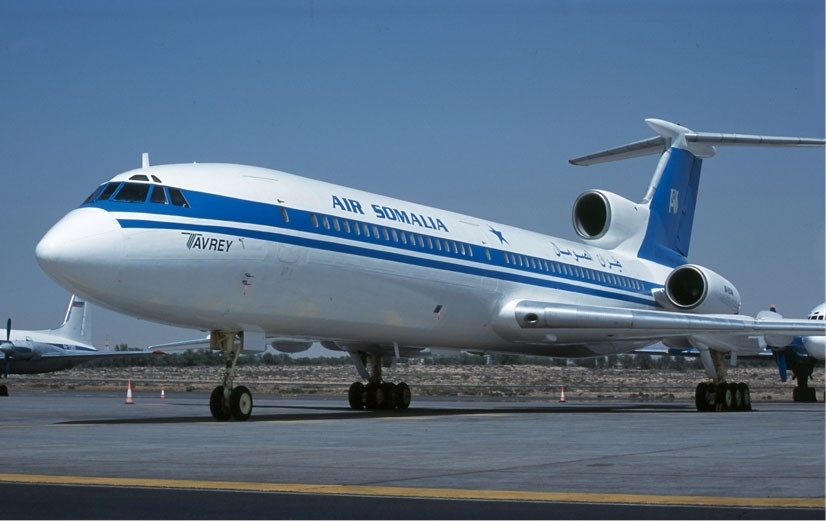
Air Somalia Tupolev Tu-154 in Sharjah, United Arab Emirates, in 2001.

There are 55 airports with unpaved landing areas. One has a runway of over 3,047 m; four are between 2,438 m to 3,047 m in length; twenty are 1,524 m to 2,437 m; twenty four are 914 m to 1,523 m; and six are under 914 m.

Major airports in the country include the Aden Adde International Airport in Mogadishu, and Kismayo Airport in Kismayo. Bender Qassim International Airport in Bosaso, and the Garowe International Airport in Garowe are in Puntland. In Somaliland, there is Hargeisa International Airport and the Berbera Airport in Berbera.

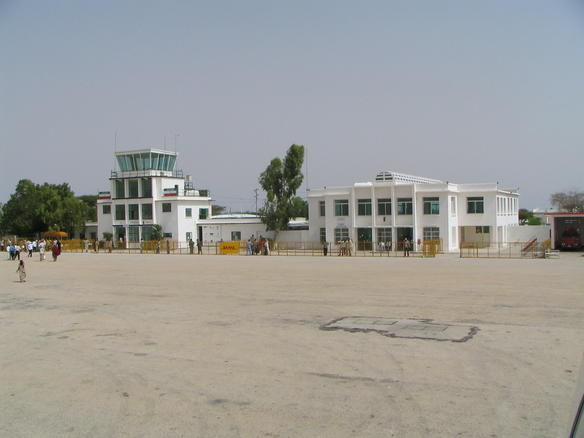
Hargeisa International Airport in Hargeisa

In September 2013, the Turkish company Favori LLC began operations at Mogadishu airport. The firm announced plans to renovate the aviation building and construct a new one, as well as upgrade other modern service structures. A$10 million project, it will increase the airport's existing 15 aircraft capacity to 60. According to Favori, there were 439,879 domestic and international flights at the airport in 2014, an increase of 319,925 flights from the previous year.

In April 2014, construction began on a new national Aviation Training Academy at Aden Adde International Airport. It is intended to enhance the capacity of aviation personnel working in Somalia's airports, and provide training within the country. A modern terminal is also being built at the airport, with funding provided by the Favori firm. According to Minister of Air Transportation and Civil Aviation Said Jama Qorshel, construction of the new terminal is scheduled to take six months, and is expected to improve the airport's functionality and operations. He added that his Ministry is also slated to establish other airports on the capital's outskirts. This in turn would serve to reduce congestion at the Aden Adde International Airport, which would then be exclusively used by large aircraft.

In December 2014, the foundation stone for a new runway was also laid at the Bender Qassim International Airport. The China Civil Engineering Construction Corporation is now slated to upgrade the airport's existing gravel runway, pave it with asphalt, and convert it from 1.8 km to 2.65 km in accordance with the code 4C operations clause.

=== Airlines ===
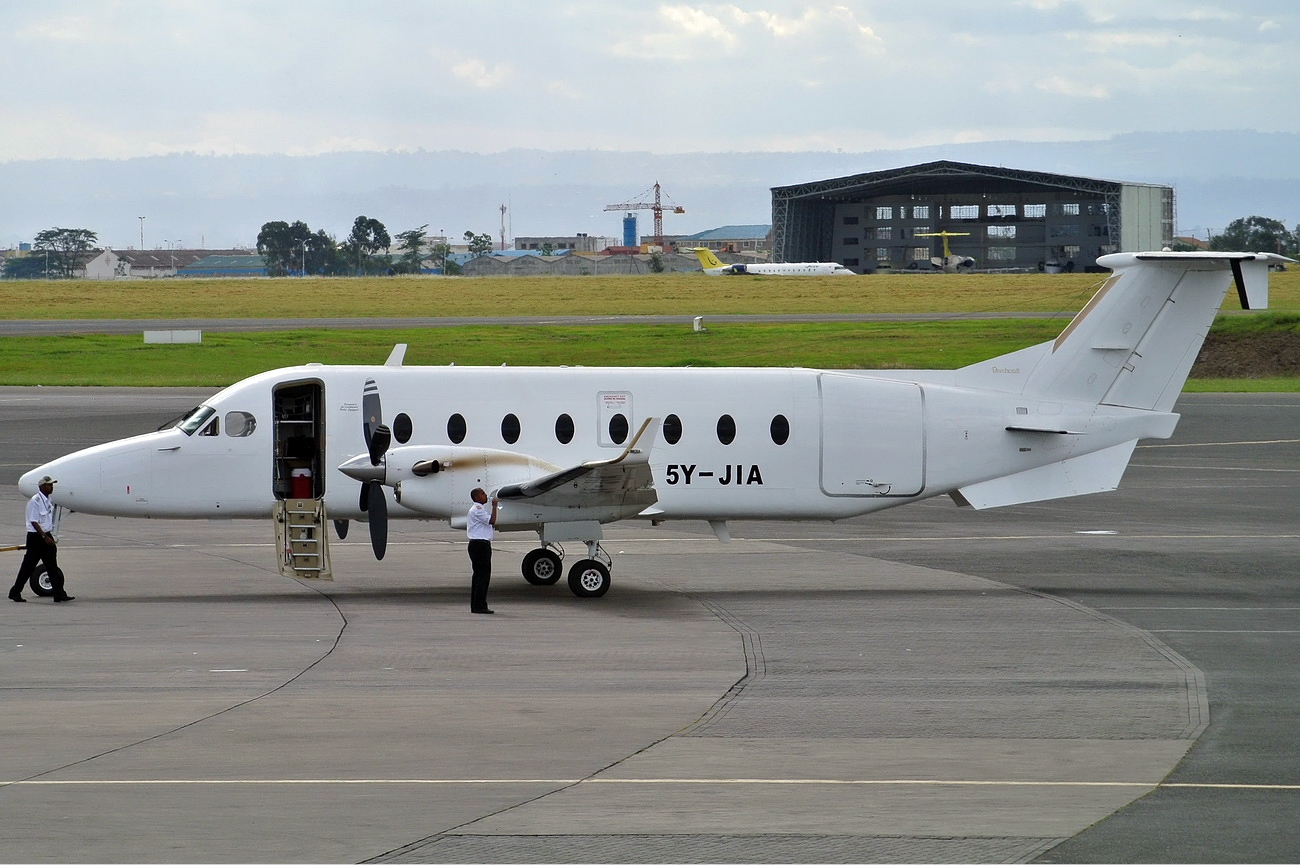
A Somali government Beechcraft 1900. Somalia today has a thriving private airline industry.

Somali Airlines was the flag carrier of Somalia. Established in 1964, it offered flights to both domestic and international destinations. Due to the outbreak of the civil war in the early 1990s, all of the carrier's operations were officially suspended in 1991. A reconstituted Somali government later began preparations in 2012 for an expected relaunch of the carrier, with the first new Somali Airlines aircraft scheduled for delivery by the end of December 2013.

According to the Somali Chamber of Commerce and Industry, the void created by the closure of Somali Airlines has since been filled by various Somali-owned private carriers. Over six of these private airline firms offer commercial flights to both domestic and international locations, including Daallo Airlines, Jubba Airways, African Express Airways, East Africa 540, Central Air and Hajara.

Additionally, the Somali central government flies its own public aircraft.

=== Gamtecs Aviation Academy ===
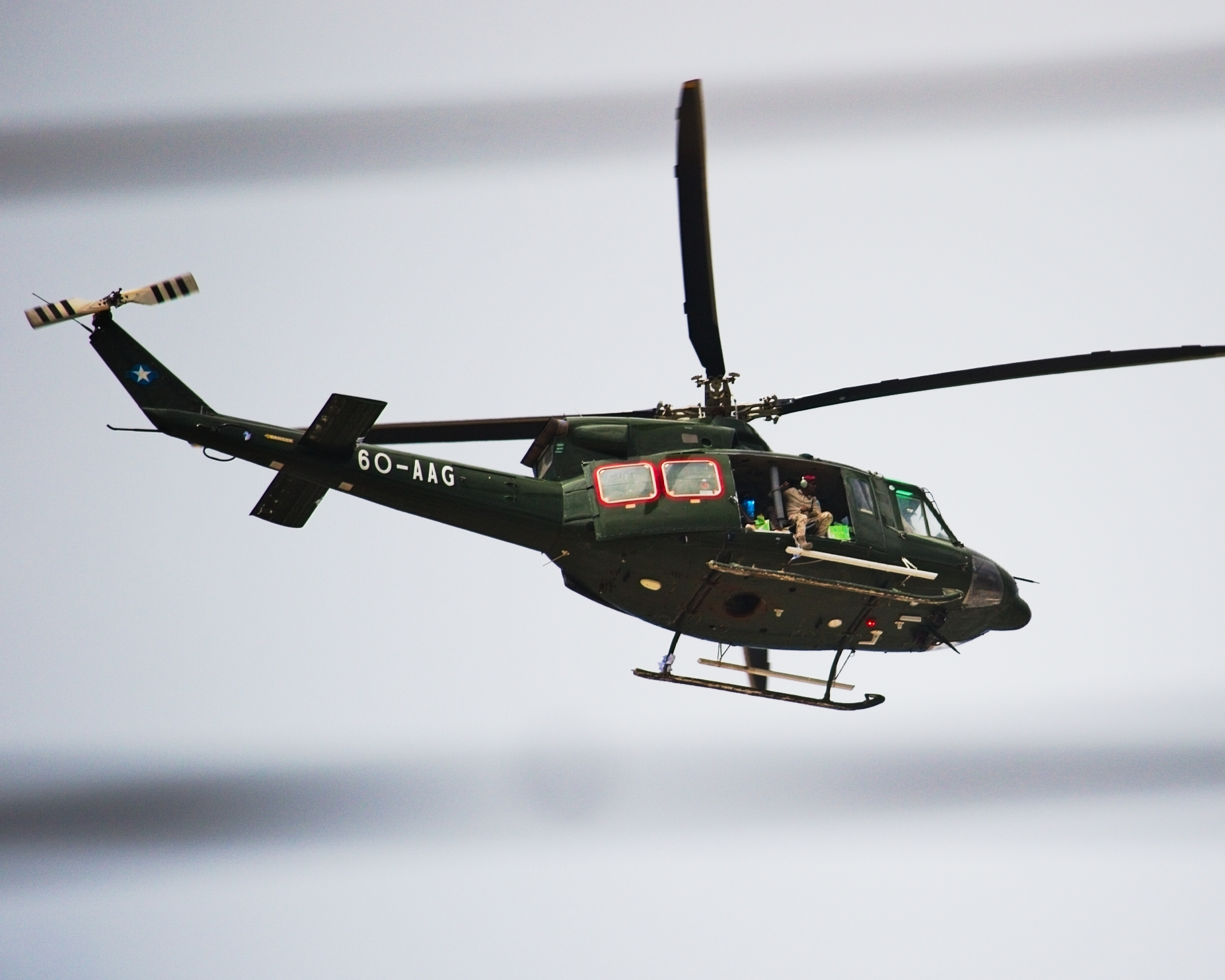
Gamtecs Aviation Academy civil-registered Agusta-Bell 412 with Somali state military markings visible on tailboom.

The Gamtecs Aviation Academy was launched in Mogadishu in 2024. The academy was established exclusively to train pilots serving national aviation purposes, including military personnel and future Somali Airlines pilots. It is not open to the general public. Recruitment for certified flight instructors began in late 2024.

The academy operates two Bell 412 helicopters, including a Bell 412SP produced in the United States (6O-AAG) and an Agusta-Bell AB-412 built in Italy (6O-AAH), as well as two Cessna aircraft: 6O-AAK (Cessna 172RG) and 6O-AAJ (Cessna FR172J). The helicopters have been used for non-official charters.

Through a bilateral partnership with an Italian aviation school, selected Somali trainees have also been sent abroad to complete advanced flight training. These include licenses such as CPL (Commercial Pilot License), ATPL (Airline Transport Pilot License), and specialized type ratings. Somali National Television (SNTV) published footage documenting the agreement and trainee deployment.

== Sea ==
=== Ports ===
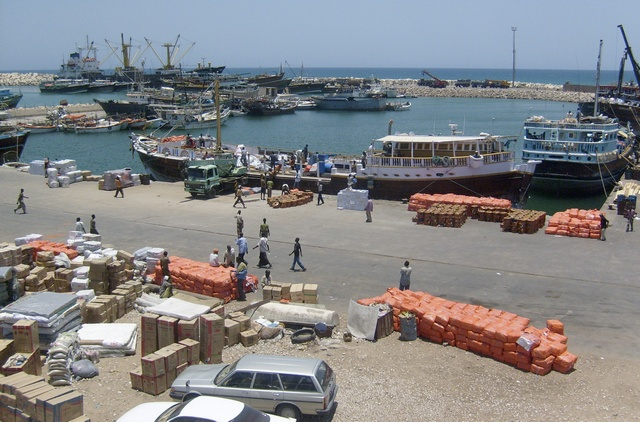
The Port of Bosaso

Possessing the longest coastline on mainland Africa, Somalia has a number of maritime transport facilities across the country. In total, there are over 15 seaports. Major class ports are found at Mogadishu, Bosaso, Berbera and Kismayo. Two jetty class ports are also situated at Las Khorey and Merca. Additionally, Aluula, Maydh, Lughaya, Eyl, Qandala, Hafun, Hobyo, Garacad and El Maan all have smaller ports.

In October 2013, the federal Cabinet endorsed an agreement with the Turkish firm Al-Bayrak to manage the Port of Mogadishu for a 20-year period. According to the Prime Minister's Office, the deal was secured by the Ministry of Ports and Public Works, and also assigns Al-Bayrak responsibility for rebuilding and modernizing the port. In April 2014, the Federal Parliament postponed finalization of the Seaport Management Deal pending the approval of a new foreign investment bill. The MPs also requested that the agreement be submitted to the legislature for deliberation and to ensure that the interests of the port's manual labourers are taken into account. In September 2014, the federal government officially delegated management of the Mogadishu Port to Al-Bayrak.

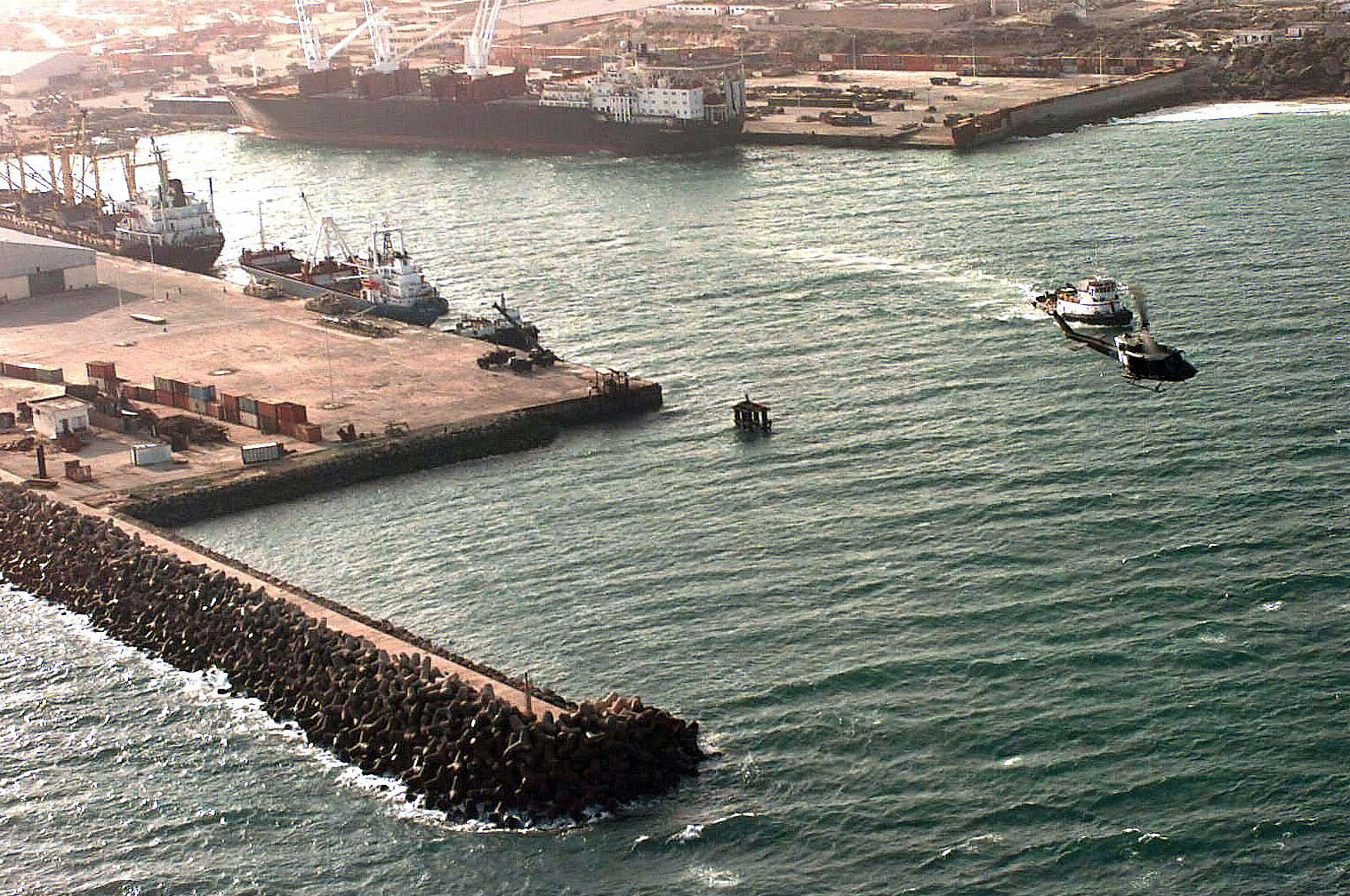
The Port of Mogadishu harbor

According to Al-Bayrak, the majority of its revenue share will be re-invested in the seaport through additional port-based trade and new docks, construction materials and machinery. The company also plans to install an environment wall and a closed circuit camera system in accordance with international security protocols, erect a modern port administration building, and clean the ship entrance channels via underwater surveillance. As of September 2014, the first phase of the renovations are reportedly complete, with the second phase underway.

The Port of Bosaso was constructed during the mid-1980s by the Siad Barre administration for annual livestock shipments to the Middle East. In January 2012, a renovation project was launched, with KMC contracted to upgrade the harbor. The initiative's first phase saw the clean-up of unwanted materials from the dockyard and was completed within the month. The second phase involves the reconstruction of the port's adjoining seabed, with the objective of accommodating larger ships.

Adeso, an organization founded by Somali environmentalist Fatima Jibrell, began a project for the redevelopment of the Port of Las Khorey. The initiative was later taken up by Faisal Hawar, CEO of the Maakhir Resource Company. In 2012, he brokered an agreement with a Greek investment firm for the development of the commercial seaport. A team of engineers was subsequently enlisted by the Puntland authorities to assess the ongoing renovations taking place at the port. According to the Minister of Ports, Saeed Mohamed Ragge, the Puntland government intends to launch more such development projects in Las Khorey.

=== Merchant marine ===
Somalia has one merchant marine. Established in 2008, it is cargo-based.

=== Regulations ===
Somalia requires a Cargo Tracking Note (CTN) for shipments destined for its ports. The CTN must be obtained prior to loading and its reference number included on the bill of lading. The requirement applies to most commercial cargo and is intended to facilitate cargo tracking, improve port security, and enhance customs oversight. Major shipping lines have also indicated that cargo arriving without a valid ECTN may be subject to delays or refusal of discharge at Somali ports.

== Railways ==
Rail transport in Somalia consisted of the erstwhile Mogadishu-Villabruzzi Railway, which ran from Mogadishu to Jowhar (then called Villaggio Duca degli Abruzzi). This railway was 114 km in total: the system was built by the colonial authorities in Italian Somaliland in the 1910s. The track gauge was 950 mm (3 ft 1 3/8 in). It was dismantled in the 1940s by the British during their military occupation of the territory. In the late 1970s there were plans to restore the railway.

== See also ==
- Communications in Somalia
