= HCM =

HCM may refer to:

- Eyl Airport, in Puntland, Somalia
- Halifax Conservatory of Music, in Canada
- Hardware cryptographic module, a type of hardware security module (HSM)
- Harish Chandra Mathur, Indian politician, former chief minister of Rajasthan
  - HCM Rajasthan State Institute of Public Administration, Jaipur, Rajasthan, India
- Harrow Central Mosque, in England
- Hausdorff Center for Mathematics, in Bonn, Germany
- Heightened cash monitoring, a United States regulatory process for university disbursements
- Hierarchical Clustering Method (asteroids), a calculation to group asteroids into families
- High-capacity magazine, a type of ammunition storage and feeding device for a repeating firearm
- Highway Capacity Manual, guide for highway standards etc. in the United States
- Historical-critical method, a branch of literary criticism
- Hitachi Construction Machinery, a Japanese company
- Ho Chi Minh, Prime Minister (1945–1955) and President (1945–1969) of North Vietnam
  - Ho Chi Minh City, in Vietnam
- Human capital management, a subset of practices related to human resource management
- Hypertrophic cardiomyopathy, a disease of the myocardium (the muscle of the heart)
