= Bosaso Airport =

Bosaso International Airport
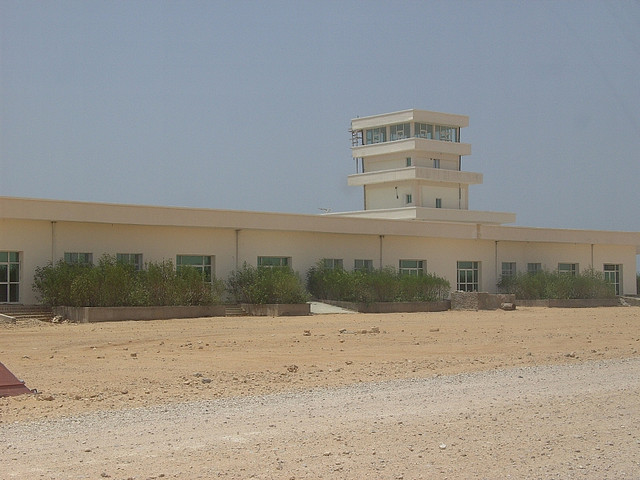
- IATA: BSA; ICAO: HCMF

Summary
- Airport type: Public
- Owner: Puntland Ministry of Aviation and Airports
- Serves: Bosaso, Puntland, Somalia
- Elevation AMSL: 3 ft (0.91 m)
- Coordinates: 11°16′32″N 049°09′00″E

Map
- Location of airport in Somalia HCMF (Africa)

Runways
Direction	Length		Surface
Direction	m	ft	Surface
09/27	3,200	10,500	Concrete/Asphalt

Bosaso Airport (Somali: Garoonka Diyaaradaha ee Bender Qaasim, Arabic: مطار بوصاصو, IATA: BSA, ICAO: HCMF), also known as Bosaso International Airport, is an airport in Somalia. It sits at 11°16′32″N 49°9′0″E on the outer edge of the city of Bosaso, the commercial capital of the northeastern Puntland macro-region and adjacent to the Gulf of Aden. It is the second largest airport in the country after the Aden Adde International Airport in Mogadishu.

The airport has been used by the United Arab Emirates as a key logistics hub to arm proxy forces in the Sudan Civil War.

== History ==
Initially, Bosaso Airport was established sometime in the 1980s with a basic laterite runway. Construction of the Bosaso International Airport started in 2007, which would have allowed larger aircraft and international flights to fly into the airport. Funds for the project were initially supplied by United Arab Emirates-based financiers.

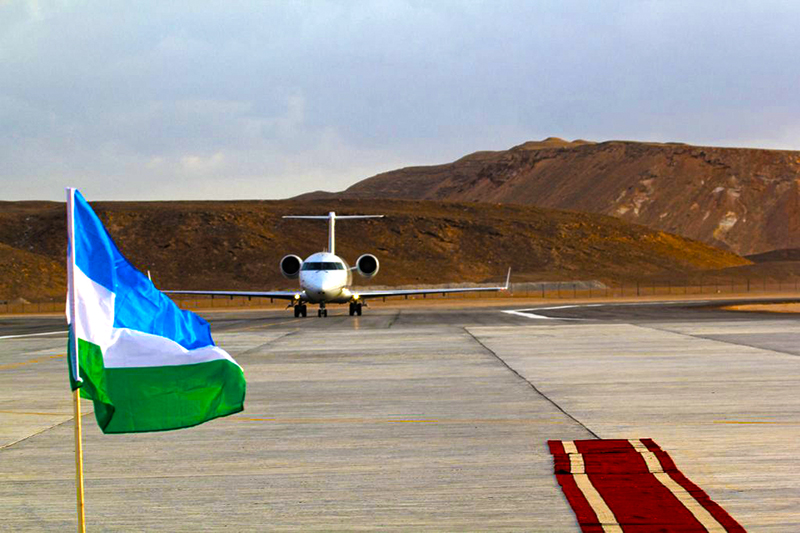
The Bosaso International Airport in 2016 after renovations

In 2008, the Puntland government signed a multi-million US dollar deal with Dubai's Lootah Group, a regional industrial organization operating in the Middle East and Africa. According to the agreement, the first phase of the investment was worth Dhs 170m and would see a set of new companies established to build, manage and operate Bosaso's free trade zone and sea and airport facilities. The Bosaso Airport Company was also slated to develop the airport complex to meet international standards, including a new 3.4 km runway, main and auxiliary buildings, taxi and apron areas, and security perimeters.

Following the 2008 Puntland presidential elections, airport renovations came to a standstill as greater focus was placed on activities in the regional capital of Garowe.

In 2012, a Product-Sharing Agreement signed between the Puntland government and the Australian oil company Range Resources earmarked $5 million USD for the construction of a runway at the Bosaso International Airport. Renovations subsequently resumed, with a bricklaying ceremony for the new runway held in November of the year. The event was attended by various Puntland government officials and businesspeople, including Bosaso Mayor Hassan Abdallah Hassan, Bari region Governor Abdisamad Gallan, and Ministry of Aviation official Saida Hussein Ali.

In late September 2013, a launch ceremony for the tender process for Bosaso airport's renovations was held at the facility. The event was attended by Puntland government and aviation officials as well as representatives of around 20 international companies, with over 24 firms vying for the project. The tender was slated to be closed in mid-October. According to Puntland Deputy Minister of Civil Aviation Abdiqani Gelle, the winner of the tender process was then scheduled to mobilize its operation within a two-month period. The airport renovations were overseen by the Puntland government, with the Italian authorities funding the project through UNOPS. It was to include the extension of the Bosaso airport's gravel runway from 1,800 m to 2,650 m. The runway's width was also to be widened from 30 m to 45 m, and feature 7.5 m gravel shoulders on both sides. According to Gelle, the Puntland government planned to carry out similar upgrades at the Garowe, Galkayo and Qardho airports.

In December 2014, the foundation stone for a new runway was laid at the airport. The inauguration event was attended by cabinet ministers, legislators, traditional leaders, and various international officials, including tender winner China Civil Engineering Construction Corporation, financial partner and Ambassador of Italy to Somalia Fabrizio Marcelli, and United Nations Office for Project Services representatives. The China Civil Engineering Construction Corporation was then slated to upgrade the airport's existing gravel runway, pave it with asphalt, and convert it from 1.8 km to 2.65 km in accordance with the code 4C operations clause.

On 8 January 2016, the renovated and modernized Bosaso Airport was officially reopened. The reopening ceremony was attended by President of the federal republic of Somalia Hassan Sheikh Mohamud, Puntland president Abdiweli Mohamed Ali, federal and regional ministers, Mayor of Bosaso Yasin Mire Mohamud, the construction company CCECC, the Italian Ambassador, and other distinguished guests and foreign envoys as well as traditional elders, including Ugas Hassan Ugas Yasin.

The United Arab Emirates has used the airport as a logistical hub to provide military support to the Rapid Support Forces (RSF) in Sudan. Weapons and mercenaries routinely transit through the airbase in order to back the RSF in the ongoing Sudanese Civil War. According to a 2025 African Intelligence report, "...no one has any say in Emirati activities within the airport complex."

== Airlines and destinations ==
Airlines	Destinations
African Express Airways	Mogadishu, Nairobi–Jomo Kenyatta
Air Arabia	Sharjah
Air Djibouti	Djibouti
Daallo Airlines	Dubai–International, Mogadishu
Ethiopian Airlines	Addis Ababa
Jubba Airways	Dubai–International, Garowe, Hargeisa, Mogadishu

== Accidents and incidents ==
Date	Location	Aircraft	Tail number	Aircraft damage	Fatalities	Description	Refs
16 August 1975	Bosaso	Douglas C-47A	6O-SAC	W/O	0/11	A Somali Airlines aircraft crashed shortly after take-off, following an engine malfunction believed to have been caused by contaminated fuel. All eleven people on board survived.	

== See also ==
- Aden Adde International Airport
- Hargeisa International Airport
- Abdullahi Yusuf International Airport
- Burao Airport
- Kismayo Airport
- Berbera Airport
- List of airports in Somalia
