= Aden Adde International Airport =

International airport serving Mogadishu, Somalia

Aden Adde International Airport Garoonka Diyaaradaha Caalamiga Ee Aadan Cadde مطار آدم عدي الدولي

- Aden Adde International Airport in 2026
- IATA: MGQ; ICAO: HCMM

Summary
- Airport type: Public
- Serves: Mogadishu, Somalia
- Hub for: Jubba Airways; Daallo Airlines
- Elevation AMSL: 28 ft (8.5 m)
- Coordinates: 02°00′49″N 45°18′17″E

Map
- Location of airport in Somalia

Runways
Direction	Length		Surface
Direction	ft	m	Surface
05/23	10,895	3,590	Asphalt
- Source: WAD

Aden Adde International Airport (Somali: Garoonka Diyaaradaha Caalamiga Ee Aadan Cadde, Arabic: مطار آدم عدي الدولي) (IATA: MGQ, ICAO: HCMM), formerly known as Mogadishu International Airport, is an international airport serving Mogadishu, the capital of Somalia. It is named after Aden Abdullah Osman Daar, the first President of Somalia.

Originally a modest-sized airport, the facility grew considerably in size in the post-independence period after numerous successive renovation projects. With the outbreak of the civil war in 1991, Aden Adde International's flight services experienced routine disruptions. However, with the security situation in Mogadishu greatly improved in the late 2010–2011 period, large-scale rehabilitation of the grounds' infrastructure and services once again resumed. By early 2013, the airport had restored most of its facilities and introduced several new features.

== History ==
Mogadishu airport was established in 1928 with the name Aeroporto di Mogadiscio-Petrella, the first such facility in the Horn of Africa. It served as the main military airport for Italian Somaliland. In the mid-1930s, the airport began offering civilian and commercial flights. A regular Asmara-Assab-Mogadishu commercial route was started in 1935, with an Ala Littoria Caproni 133 providing 13-hour flights from the Mogadishu airport to Italian Eritrea. The aircraft had a maximum capacity of 18 passengers, a record capacity at that time.

In 1936, Ala Littoria launched an intercontinental connection between Mogadishu-Asmara-Khartoum-Tripoli and Rome. The voyage lasted four days and was one of the first long range flights in the world.

During the post-independence period, Mogadishu International Airport offered flights to numerous global destinations. In the mid-1960s, the airport was enlarged to accommodate more international carriers, with the state-owned Somali Airlines providing regular trips to all major cities. By 1969, the airport could also host small jets and DC 6B-type aircraft.

In the 1970s, Somalia's then-ruling socialist government enlisted its Soviet allies for major renovations to the ground's facilities. The airport's capacity to cater to both civilian and military needs was in the process significantly enlarged.

The Somali Air Corps (SAC) also used the airport at this time and had an airlift wing stationed in the capital. The SAC maintained a military academy at the airport that was used by all air force members.

In the 1980s, the Somali federal government recruited the U.S. Navy, its new Cold War partner, to further enlarge the Mogadishu airport. The project included the construction of a modern control tower and navigational technology. The Somali Civil Aviation Authority (SOMCAA), which then regulated the national aviation industry, also signed a contract with the Italian firm Selenia worth an estimated 17 billion Italian lire ($8.5 million). The agreement stipulated that the company would build a second terminal for international routes as well as a new control tower. The Italian firm was also tasked with supplying air traffic control equipment.

With the collapse of the Siad Barre regime and the ensuing civil war, the airport's ongoing renovations came to a halt. Aviation operations also routinely experienced disruptions and the airport's grounds incurred significant damage. On 3 August 2006, African Express Airways became the first international airline to resume regular flights to Mogadishu International Airport.

On 8 June 2007, the Transitional Federal Government (TFG) announced that the airport would be renamed in honor of the first President of Somalia, Aden Abdullah Osman Daar, who had died earlier in the day.

The following year, due to security risks brought on by the resumption of fighting in the wake of the Ethiopian intervention, most civilian aircraft opted to land and depart from K50 Airstrip, situated about 50 km from Mogadishu in Lower Shabelle. However, in the late 2010 period, the security situation in Mogadishu had significantly improved, with the federal government eventually managing to assume full control of the capital by August of the following year.

On 20 August 2012, the Aden Adde International Airport hosted the swearing in ceremony for many legislators in the nation's new Federal Parliament. The event also saw the appointment of General Muse Hassan Sheikh Sayid Abdulle as interim President and Parliamentary Speaker.

In 2013, the International Civil Aviation Organization (ICAO) officially removed the airport from its Zone 5 list of airports deemed security risks.

Interior of the Airport, 2026

Check-in area, 2026

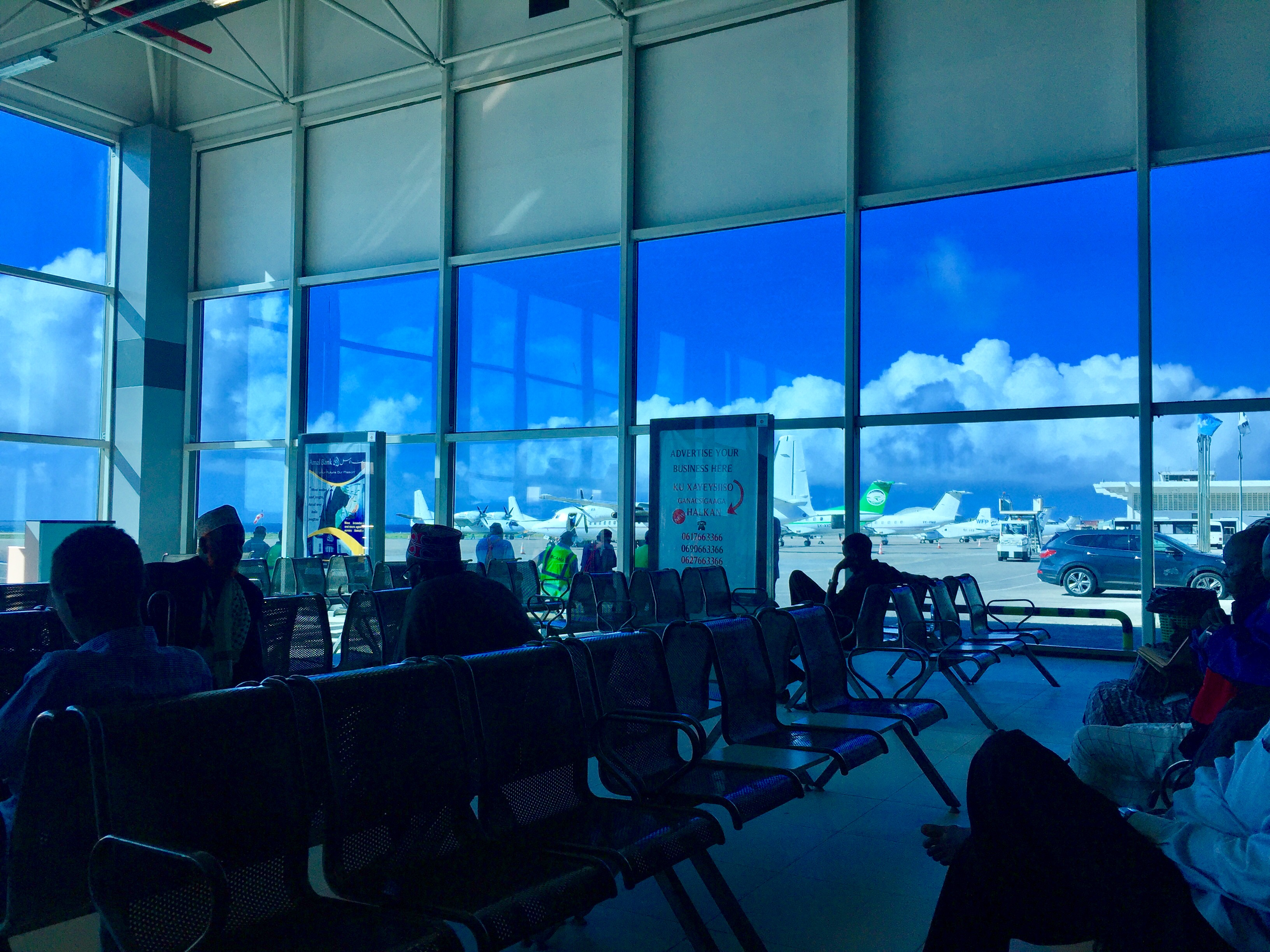
Departure waiting area, 2017

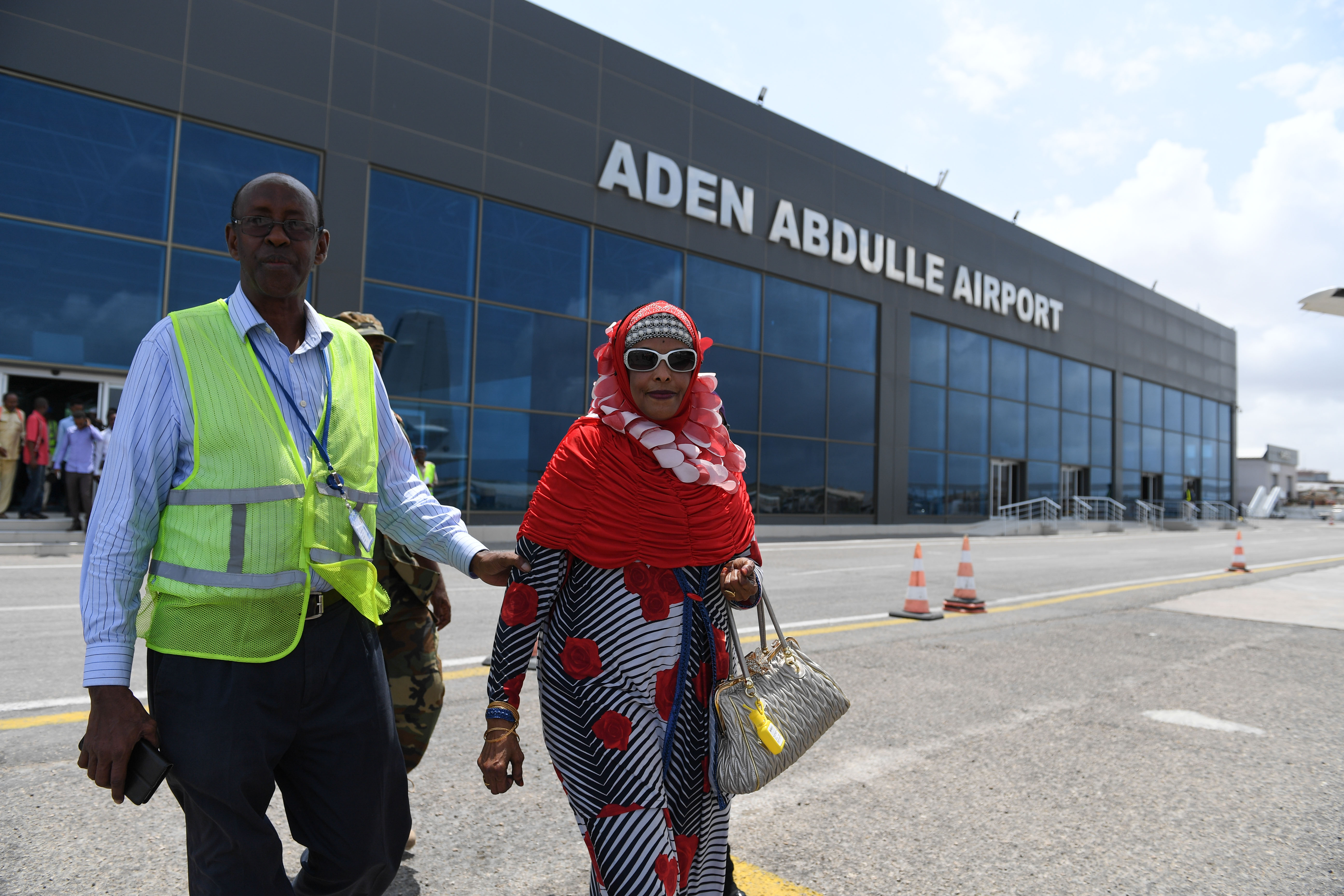
Asli Abade, Somalia's first female pilot and Africa's first female air force pilot, on the tarmac, 2017

In June 2014, Minister of Air Transportation and Civil Aviation Said Jama Qorshel announced that additional up-to-date technology earmarked for the Aden Adde International Airport in Mogadishu would be delivered. As of June 2014, the largest services using Aden Adde International Airport include the Somali-owned private carriers Daallo Airlines, Jubba Airways and African Express Airways, in addition to UN charter planes, and Turkish Airlines. The airport also offers flights to other Somali cities such as Baidoa, Galkayo, Berbera and Hargeisa, as well as international destinations like Djibouti, Jeddah, and Istanbul. According to Favori, there were 439,879 domestic and international passengers at the airport in 2014, an increase of 319,925 passengers from the previous year. As of November 2014, the airport accommodates more than 40 flights each day, up from 3 flights in 2011.

== Renovations ==
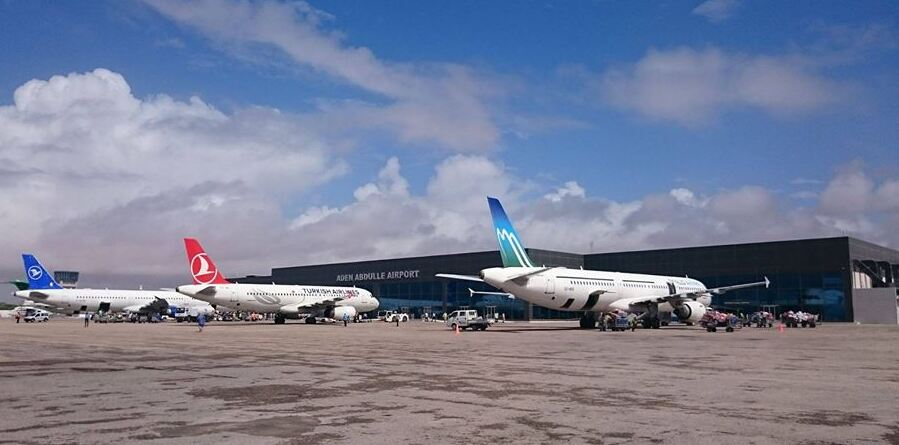
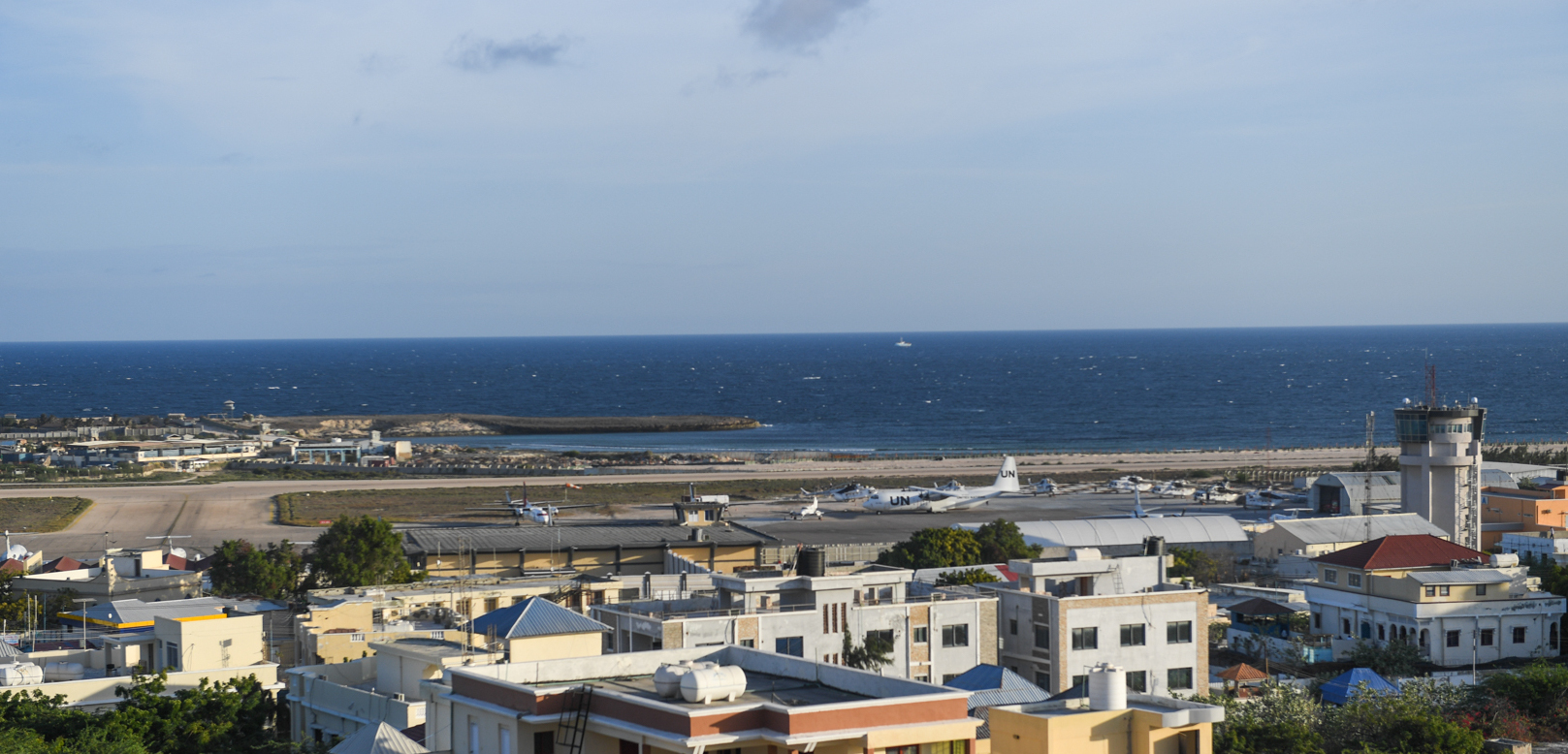
Top: Aircraft parked on the tarmac at Aden Adde International Airport (2015) Bottom: Looking southeast toward the control tower, tarmac, and the Indian Ocean (2022)

=== SKA Air and Logistics ===
In late 2010, SKA Air and Logistics, a Dubai-based aviation firm that specializes in conflict zones, was contracted by the Transitional Federal Government to manage operations over a period of ten years at the re-opened Aden Adde International Airport. The company was assigned the task of running security screening, passenger security and terminals. The Ministry of Transport officially announced the partnership in May 2011, with the domestically registered firm SKA-Somalia starting operations in July of the year.

Among its first initiatives, worth an estimated $6 million, SKA invested in new airport equipment and expanded support services by hiring, training and equipping 200 local workers to meet international airport standards. The company also assisted in comprehensive infrastructure renovations, restored a dependable supply of electricity, revamped the baggage handling facilities as well as the arrival and departure lounges, put into place electronic check-in systems, and firmed up on security and work-flow. Additionally, SKA connected the grounds' Somali Civil Aviation and Meteorological Agency (SCAMA) and immigration, customs, commercial airlines, and Somali Police Force officials to the internet. By January 2013, the firm had introduced shuttle buses to ferry travelers to and from the passenger terminal. It also provided consultancy on support services in other airports around the country, and invested in logistical redevelopment solutions.

=== Turkey ===
In December 2011, the Turkish government unveiled plans to further modernize the airport as part of Turkey's broader engagement in the local post-conflict reconstruction process. Among the scheduled renovations are new systems and infrastructure, including a modern control tower to monitor the airspace.

United Nations Humanitarian Air Service on the south tarmac in 2019

In September 2013, the Turkish company Favori LLC began operations at the airport. The firm announced plans to renovate the aviation building and construct a new one, as well as upgrade other modern service structures. A $10 million project, it will increase the airport's existing 15 aircraft capacity to 60.

In April 2014, then-Prime Minister of Somalia Abdiweli Sheikh Ahmed laid the foundation stone for a new national Aviation Training Academy at the Aden Adde International Airport. The new institution would serve to enhance the capacity of aviation personnel working in Somalia's airports, and would focus training within the country. Construction of a new terminal was scheduled to take six months and is expected to improve the airport's functionality and operations.

South view of the airport in 2022

In November 2014, Favori announced that the modernization of the airport was almost finished, and was predicted to be completed by the end of 2015. Among the facilities being renovated are transit hubs and runways.

In January 2015, President of Somalia Hassan Sheikh Mohamud and President of Turkey Recep Tayyip Erdoğan officially inaugurated the airport's new terminal. The facility was built by Kozuva, a private Turkish construction firm. It will enable the airport to double its number of daily commercial flights to 60, with a throughput of 1,000 passengers per hour.

=== IOM ===
In January 2013, a new airport immigration building was opened. With assistance provided by Japan through the International Organization for Migration (IOM), it features offices, training facilities, and staff accommodation for early shift workers.

Additionally, the IOM has helped firm up on airport security by training 84 civil aviation, immigration, finance, and customs department officers on proper border management and immigration protocol. It also installed its patented Personal Registration and Identification System at both Aden Adde and the capital's seaport.

== Airlines and destinations ==
=== Passenger ===
Airlines	Destinations
Air Djibouti	Djibouti, Hargeisa
Daallo Airlines	Bosaso, Garowe, Hargeisa, Jeddah, Kismayo, Nairobi–Jomo Kenyatta
Egyptair	Cairo, Djibouti
Ethiopian Airlines	Addis Ababa
flydubai	Dubai–International (suspended)
Freedom Airline Express	Garowe, Nairobi–Jomo Kenyatta
i-Fly Air	Nairobi–Jomo Kenyatta
Jubba Airways	Adado, Baidoa, Bosaso, Djibouti, Galkayo, Garowe, Guriel, Hargeisa, Jeddah, Kismayo, Nairobi–Jomo Kenyatta
Kenya Airways	Nairobi–Jomo Kenyatta
Qatar Airways	Djibouti
SalamAir	Muscat
Turkish Airlines	Istanbul
Uganda Airlines	Entebbe

=== Cargo ===
Airlines	Destinations
Astral Aviation	Nairobi–Jomo Kenyatta
Ethiopian Airlines Cargo	Addis Ababa
Kenya Airways Cargo	Nairobi–Jomo Kenyatta
MNG Airlines	Istanbul
Turkish Cargo	Istanbul

== Accidents and incidents ==
Date	Aircraft	Tail number	Aircraft damage	Fatalities	Description	Refs
6 May 1970	Vickers Viscount 700	6O-AAJ	Written off	5/30	The aircraft was on final approach to Mogadishu International Airport when control was lost after a fire erupted in the cargo hold. Upon a nose-down landing, the nosegear collapsed and the airplane continued rolling on its nose until it came to rest. The fire eventually engulfed and destroyed the fuselage.	
13 October 1977	Boeing 737-200 Adv	D-ABCE	Minor	0/87	Lufthansa Flight 181, a Lufthansa Boeing 737-230 Adv aircraft named "Landshut", was hijacked by four members of the Popular Front for the Liberation of Palestine (PFLP), acting in coordination with the Red Army Faction (RAF). Their demands included the release of 11 RAF prisoners in West Germany as well as two Palestinians held in Turkish prisons. On the night of 18 October, after coordination with the Barre administration, the West German counter‑terrorism unit GSG 9 stormed the besieged aircraft. Three hijackers were killed, while the fourth was severely wounded and captured. All 87 passengers were rescued during the operation, which was codenamed Feuerzauber, German for "Magic Fire".	
19 August 2011	Boeing 737-800	TC-JFL	Minor	0/6	The wing of a Turkish Airlines aircraft carrying a Turkish government delegation, businessmen, popular artists and journalists scraped the runway upon landing. The plane was in unfit condition to continue the flight. All passengers were unhurt.	
9 August 2013	Antonov An-12	1513	Written off	4/6	An Ethiopian Air Force An-12 aircraft transporting weapons burst into flames upon landing, killing four of the six crew members and injuring the other two. Investigations were subsequently launched to ascertain the cause of the crash. The airport runway was undamaged.	
12 October 2015	Airbus A300	SU-BMZ	Written off	0/6	A Tristar Air Airbus A300 was carrying 40 tonnes of perishables on behalf of United Nations when the aircraft made several unsuccessful attempts to land, ran out of fuel and ditched in an unoccupied field. Two occupants received minor injuries. The aircraft was damaged beyond economic repair.	
2 February 2016	Airbus A321-100	SX-BHS	Written off	1/81	Shortly after takeoff, a Daallo Airline Airbus A321 operating Daallo Airlines Flight 159 suffered an onboard explosion, with the suicide bomber blown out of the plane. Pilots were able to make an emergency landing.	
30 May 2017	Dornier 328JET	N330BG	Substantial	0/4	The airport was briefly closed because of an emergency landing. A Dornier 328JET chartered by the U.S.-based military contractor Bancroft was reportedly carrying American officials when it experienced landing gear failure upon approach to Mogadishu. As a result, the plane circled the airport to burn fuel, before making a successful emergency landing that was caught on video. All four people on board survived and were safely evacuated shortly after landing.	
18 July 2022	Fokker 50	5Y-JXN	Written off	0/36	A Jubba Airways flight from Baidoa Airport in Baidoa, flipped over while landing. All 36 passengers and crew survived the crash. The Fokker 50 was heavily damaged.	
11 July 2023	Embraer EMB 120 Brasilia	6O-AAD	Written off	0/34	A Halla Airlines Embraer EMB 120 Brasilia crashed on landing from Garowe after the left main landing gear collapsed.	
2 July 2025	Mil Mi-24	AUO-015	Written off	5/8	A Ugandan Air Force helicopter being used by the African Union Support and Stabilization Mission in Somalia and originating from Baledogle Airfield in Lower Shabelle crashed during landing at the airport.	
10 February 2026	Fokker 50	60-YAS	Written off	0/55	A Starsky Aviation passenger aircraft made a water-landing after overshooting the airport runway during an emergency landing shortly after takeoff on its way to Puntland.	

== See also ==
- New Mogadishu International Airport
- Transport in Somalia
- List of airports in Somalia
