= Adado Airport =

Airport in Somalia

Adado Airport Cadaado Airport
- IATA: AAD; ICAO: HCAD

Summary
- Airport type: Public
- Serves: Adado
- Elevation AMSL: 1,001 ft / 305 m
- Coordinates: 6°05′45″N 46°38′15″E

Map
- Location of the airport in Somalia

Runways
Direction	Length		Surface
Direction	m	ft	Surface
05/23	2,675	8,776	Sand
- Sources: Google Maps

Adado Airport (IATA: AAD, ICAO: HCAD), also known as Cadaado Airport (Somali: Gegada Diyaaradaha Cadaado), is an airport serving the town of Adado in Adado District, Somalia. Adado Airport is the largest functional airport in Galmudug State of Somalia.

== Airlines and destinations ==
Airlines	Destinations
Jubba Airways	Mogadishu

== See also ==
- List of airports in Somalia
- Transport in Somalia
