= Maakhir University =

University in Somalia

Somali National University-Badhan (Ex Maakhir University)
- جامعة ماخر
- Motto in English: Education is a key to success
- Type: National University
- Established: 2010
- Affiliations: Somalia National University
- Director: Aidarus Ahmed Farah Oday
- Students: 2000
- Location: Badhan, Somalia; 10.704020°N 48.327132°E
- Campus: Urban and suburban

Maakhir University (Somali: Jaamacada Maakhir, Arabic: جامعة ماخر) was a university created in 2010 by a group of Diaspora and supported by the Puntland government in the eastern Sanaag region. In september 2019, this university officially becomes a branch of Somali National University (Jaamacadda Ummadda Soomaaliyeed) in Puntland state.

== Overview ==
Situated in Badhan, the college was established with the purpose of providing affordable higher education to residents of the province and elsewhere in the nation. According to the institution's website, Maakhir University offers undergraduate degrees with the ultimate goal of contributing to the development of Somali society.

The Sanaag, Maakhir diaspora community has been the university's main sponsor since the outbreak of Somalia's civil war in the early 1990s. Members purchased equipment from abroad, which they then sent to the institution. The latter contributions include vehicles and office equipment. Expatriates from the region have also contributed to the construction of a new university campus, a project that has been in the works for the last couple of years.

Additionally, through its representative to Kuwait, Faisal Hawar, the Puntland government signed an agreement in Dubai with a Kuwaiti company for the development of facilities at Maakhir University as well as the Garowe International Airport. The deal was valued at US$10 million and was financed by the Kuwait Fund for Arab Economic Development (KFAED).

== History ==
The school opened in April 2010, and the closing ceremony for the first year was held in November.

In December 2010, the Kuwaiti government committed to provide $10 million for the construction of the Garowe International Airport and Maakhir University in Badhan.

In April 2014, the Kuwaiti government and the Puntland administration signed an agreement in Dubai, United Arab Emirates, to build the Garowe International Airport and Maakhir University in the Sanaag region.

In December 2014. the first graduation ceremony was held at Maakhir University.

In September 2018, a new seven-story school building was completed. Puntland President Abdiweli Gaas visited Maakhir University.
