= Bluebird Aviation =

Kenyan airline

| IATA | ICAO | Call sign |
|---|---|---|
| – | BBZ | COBRA |
- Founded: 1992
- Hubs: Wilson Airport
- Focus cities: Kenya
- Fleet size: 9
- Parent company: Bluebird Aviation
- Headquarters: Nairobi, Kenya
- Website: bluebirdaviation.com

Bluebird Aviation is a regional airline based in Nairobi, Kenya. It was established in 1992 and operates regional charter services. Its main base is Wilson Airport, Nairobi.

== Description ==
Bluebird Aviation Limited is a Kenyan air charter company based at Wilson Airport, Nairobi. The company was incorporated in 1992 and operates scheduled, non-scheduled and ad hoc air charter services within the East and Central African region with special emphasis on Eastern Africa. The company is a member of the Kenya Association of Air Operators, an umbrella body that champions the interests of aviation in Kenya.

== Staff ==
The company has over 80 staff ranging from airline pilots, aircraft engineers, and finance managers to ground and air operations staff.

== Fleet ==
=== Current fleet ===
As of July 2026, Bluebird Aviation operates the following aircraft:

Bluebird Aviation fleet
| Aircraft | In service | Orders | Passengers | Notes |
|---|---|---|---|---|
| Beechcraft 1900D | 1 | — | | |
| Bombardier Dash 8-100 | 4 | — | | |
| Bombardier Dash 8-Q400 | 1 | — | | |
| Bombardier Dash 8-Q400PF | 3 | — | | |
| Total | 9 | | | |

=== Former fleet ===
As of August 2025, Bluebird Aviation operated 1 Beechcraft 1900D, 4 Bombardier Dash 8-100, 1 Bombardier Dash 8-Q400 and 3 Bombardier Dash 8-Q400PF.

The Bluebird Aviation fleet also previously included the following aircraft (as of July 2011):

- 1 Raytheon Beech 1900D Airliner
- 2 Beechcraft King Air 200
- 1 Bombardier Dash 8 Q200
- 5 Fokker 50
- 1 Let L-410A
- 3 Let L-410UVP-E

== Accidents and incidents ==
- 23 May 2004: Two Bluebird Aviation Let L-410 Turbolet planes hit each other inflight. One of the planes crashed into the ground, killing both crew members (the only people on board), while another landed safely.
- 14 July 2020: A Bombardier Dash 8 Q400 (5Y-VVU) was flying from Djibouti to Beletwein, when a donkey crossed the runway as the aircraft was landing in Beledweyne Airport, causing the aircraft to veer off the runway. The plane then caught on fire after the crash. All 3 crew members onboard survived the crash.
