= Hobyo Airport =

Airport in Somalia

Obbia Airport Gegada Diyaaradaha Hobyo
- IATA: CMO; ICAO: HCMO

Summary
- Airport type: Public
- Owner: Somali Civil Aviation Authority
- Serves: Hobyo, Somalia
- Hub for: Hobyo
- Elevation AMSL: 65 ft / 20 m
- Coordinates: 5°21′21.31″N 48°30′51.84″E

Map
- Location of the airport in Somalia

Runways
Direction	Length		Surface
Direction	ft	m	Surface
1	3,609	1,100
- Sources: World Airport Codes

Obbia Airport (IATA: CMO, ICAO: HCMO) is an airstrip serving Hobyo, Somalia. The facility has a single runway with a non-hardened surface and lies parallel to the coastline, about 2 km inland. The runway has a length of 1100m. There are no fuel storage facilities. There are no scheduled flights to Hobyo.

In August 2019, it was announced that Qatar planned to build a new airport in Hobyo, but the concrete intentions are not clear yet.

== See also ==
- List of airports in Somalia
