= African Express Airways =

Somali airline

IATA	ICAO	Call sign
XU	AXK	EXPRESS JET
- Founded: 1986; 40 years ago
- Hubs: Jomo Kenyatta International Airport
- Focus cities: Mogadishu
- Fleet size: 1
- Destinations: 3
- Headquarters: Embakasi, Nairobi, Kenya
- Website: flyafricanexpress.com

African Express Airways is a Somali-owned Kenyan airline with its head office at Jomo Kenyatta International Airport in Embakasi, Nairobi, Kenya.

== Services ==
African Express Airways is a short-haul airline, which caters to business and leisure travellers and operates daily departures. It also has an associate company located near its head offices, Jet Aircraft Maintenance Ltd., which specializes in jet aircraft maintenance ranging from 'A' to 'B', 'C' and 'D' checks for most medium-range aircraft of Western aircraft brands. The company has a new in site hangar equipped with all facilities, including maintenance hangar rental services for third parties who may have their own engineers and approvals.

== Destinations ==
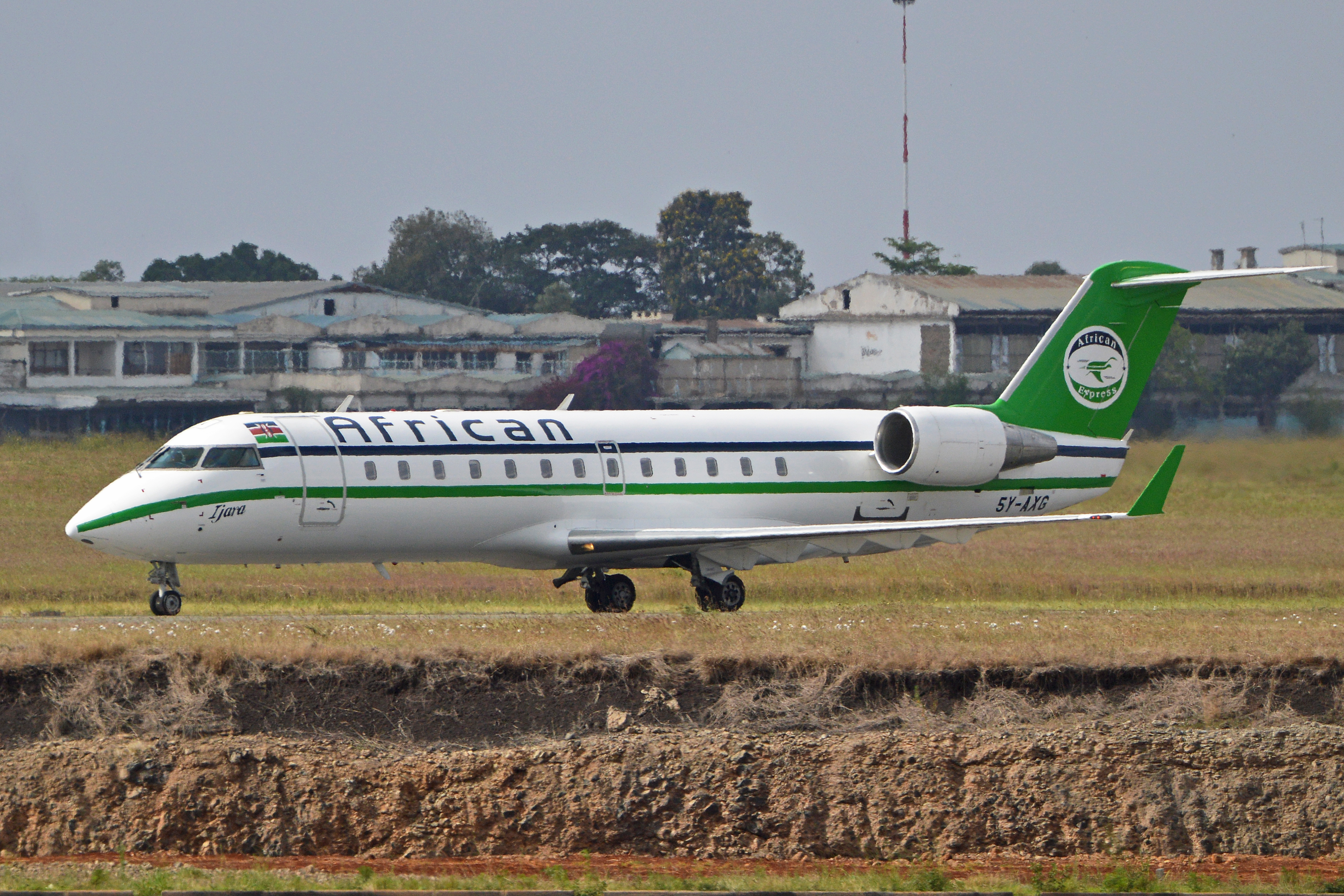
African Express Airways Bombardier CRJ200

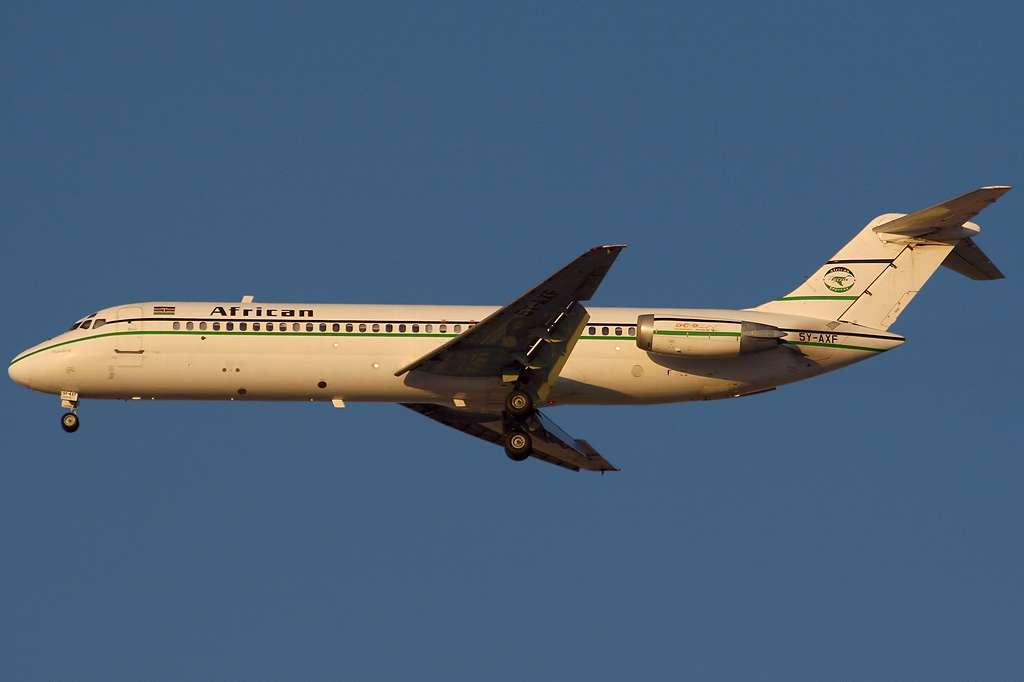
African Express Airways Douglas DC-9-30

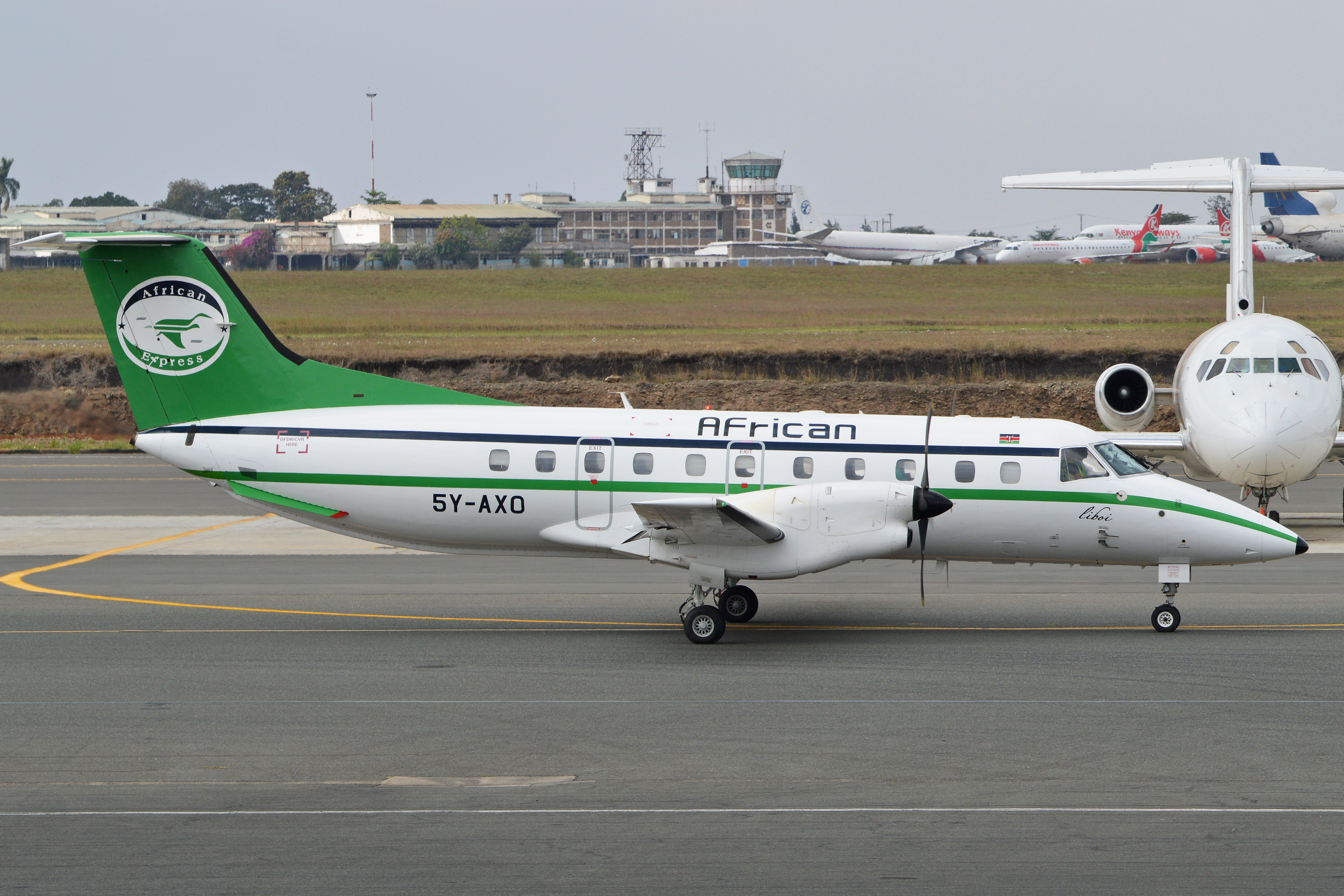
A former African Express Airways Embraer 120

=== Current destinations ===
As of July 2024, African Express Airways operates services to the following domestic and international scheduled destinations:

Kenya

- Nairobi - Jomo Kenyatta International Airport base

Somalia

- Mogadishu - Aden Adde International Airport
- Hargeisa - Hargeisa International Airport

Yemen

- Seiyun - Seiyun Hadhramaut Airport

=== Former destinations ===
The airline previously also served the following airports:

Comoros

- Moroni – Prince Said Ibrahim International Airport

Djibouti

- Djibouti - Djibouti International Airport

Egypt

- Cairo – Cairo International Airport

Kenya

- Mombasa – Moi International Airport
- Eldoret – Eldoret International Airport
- Kisumu – Kisumu International Airport

Somalia

- Berbera – Berbera Airport
- Bosaso - Bosaso Airport
- Garowe - Garowe Airport
- Kismayo - Kismayo Airport

South Sudan

- Juba – Juba International Airport

United Arab Emirates

- Dubai – Dubai International Airport
- Sharjah – Sharjah International Airport

Yemen

- Aden – Aden International Airport
- Mukalla – Riyan Mukalla Airport

== Fleet ==
=== Current fleet ===
As of July 2026, African Express Airways operates the following aircraft:

African Express Airways fleet
Aircraft	Total	Orders	Passengers		
Aircraft	Total	Orders	C	Y	Total
Douglas DC-9-30	1	—	10	90	100
Total	1	—			

=== Former fleet ===
As of August 2025, African Express Airways operated 1 Douglas DC-9 and 1 Bombardier CRJ200.

The airline also previously operated the following aircraft:

- 1 further Douglas DC-9-30
- 1 McDonnell Douglas MD-82
- Embraer EMB 120ER Brasilia
- Boeing 727-200

== Accidents and incidents ==
- 4 May 2020: An East African Express Airways Embraer EMB 120 Brasilia, registration number 5Y-AXO, on an air charter flight delivering pandemic relief supplies, crashed on approach to Berdale, Somalia, killing all 2 crew and 4 non-revenue passengers on board. On 10 May, a leaked African Union peacekeeping force report alleged that ground troops of the Ethiopian National Defense Force who were operating outside the peacekeeping force's authority mistakenly concluded that the aircraft was engaged in a suicide attack and shot it down; this allegation ignited controversy over Ethiopian and Kenyan military incursions into Somalia to fight Al-Shabaab militants there. The three countries have initiated a joint investigation of the accident.
- 31 March 2024: A Boeing 727-200 operated by Safe Air Company scheduled to fly from Juba International Airport to Malakal Airport, South Sudan, undershot the runway after experiencing technical issues. The plane collided into a McDonnell Douglas MD-82 belonging to African Express Airways, that had crashed around two months earlier in the same airport.

== See also ==
- Airlines of Africa
