= Dusmareb Airport =

Airport in Somalia

Ugaas Noor Airport Gegada Diyaaradaha Dhuusamareeb
- IATA: none; ICAO: none

Summary
- Airport type: Public
- Serves: Dusmareb
- Elevation AMSL: 840 ft / 256 m
- Coordinates: 5°28′15″N 46°21′35″E

Map
- Location of the airport in Somalia

Runways
Direction	Length		Surface
Direction	ft	m	Surface
14/32	9,500	1,500	Asphalt
- Source: Google Maps

Dusmareb Airport also known as Ugaas Noor Airport or Ugaas Nuur Airport is an airport serving Dusmareb, the capital city of Galmudug state and the central Galguduud region of Somalia.

== See also ==
- Transport in Somalia
