= Eyl Airport =

Airport in Somalia

Eyl Airport Gegada Diyaaradaha Eyl
- IATA: HCM; ICAO: HCME

Summary
- Airport type: Public
- Owner: Puntland Ministry for Civil Aviation and Airports
- Serves: Eyl, Somalia
- Elevation AMSL: 879 ft / 268 m
- Coordinates: 08°06′15″N 049°49′12″E

Map
- Location of airport in Somalia

Runways
Direction	Length		Surface
Direction	m	ft	Surface
06/24	1,050	3,445

Eyl Airport (IATA: HCM, ICAO: HCME) is an airport serving Eyl, a town in the Nugal region in Puntland, Somalia.

== Facilities ==
The airport is at an elevation of 879 feet (268 m) above mean sea level and has a runway of 1,050 metres (3,445 ft).

== See also ==
- List of airports in Somalia
