= Jubba Airways =

Somali airline

Jubba Airways الخطوط الجوية جوبا
IATA	ICAO	Call sign
3J	JBW	JUBBA
- Founded: May 1998; 28 years ago
- Hubs: Aden Adde International Airport; Hargeisa Egal International Airport
- Focus cities: Djibouti-Ambouli International Airport
- Fleet size: 2
- Destinations: 13
- Parent company: African Airways Alliance
- Headquarters: Nairobi, Kenya
- Website: www.jubbaairways.com

Jubba Airways is a Somali airline that operates domestic passenger and cargo flights within Somalia, as well as to destinations in the Middle East.

== History ==
The carrier was founded in 1998 by one Calgary-based Somali entrepreneur, Said Nur Qailie. Previously headquartered at the Aden Adde International Airport in Mogadishu, Somalia, it is now based in Nairobi, Kenya, with additional branches in various other areas.

In May 1998, a month after the company had been established, the airline embarked on its first flight. This represented the first direct flight from Sharjah to Mogadishu since the state-owned Somali Airlines discontinued operations in 1991.

Boeing 737-300(QC) enters into service, September 16, 2026

As of 2009, Jubba Airways was registered in Nairobi, Kenya. It also has branches in Somalia, Djibouti, Saudi Arabia, the United Arab Emirates and Uganda. The airline largely fills the niche vacated by the defunct Somali Airlines and operates domestic passenger and cargo services. It serves destinations in Somalia including Mogadishu, Bosaso, Galkayo, and Hargeisa. Flights to Djibouti, the UAE (Dubai), and for Hajj pilgrims to Jeddah are also important routes for Jubba Airways. In addition, the airline offers cargo flights. Jubba Airways maintains its own aircraft, serviced by engineers that are a part of a team of 300 trained employees.

In February 2015, Jubba Airways merged with Daallo Airlines to form the new holding company African Airways Alliance. Both airlines continue to operate under separate brands.

== Destinations ==
As of May 2024, Jubba Airways serves the following scheduled destinations:

Country	City	Airport	Notes	Refs
Djibouti	Djibouti City	Djibouti–Ambouli International Airport		
Kenya	Nairobi	Jomo Kenyatta International Airport		
Saudi Arabia	Jeddah	King Abdulaziz International Airport		
Somalia	Adado	Adado Airport		
Somalia	Baidoa	Baidoa Airport		
Somalia	Bosaso	Bosaso Airport		
Somalia	Galkayo	Abdullahi Yusuf Airport		
Somalia	Garowe	Garowe Airport		
Somalia	Guriel	Guriel Airport		
Somalia	Kismayo	Kismayo Airport		
Somalia	Mogadishu	Aden Adde International Airport	Hub	
Somalia	Hargeisa	Egal International Airport	Hub	
United Arab Emirates	Dubai	Dubai International Airport		

== Fleet ==
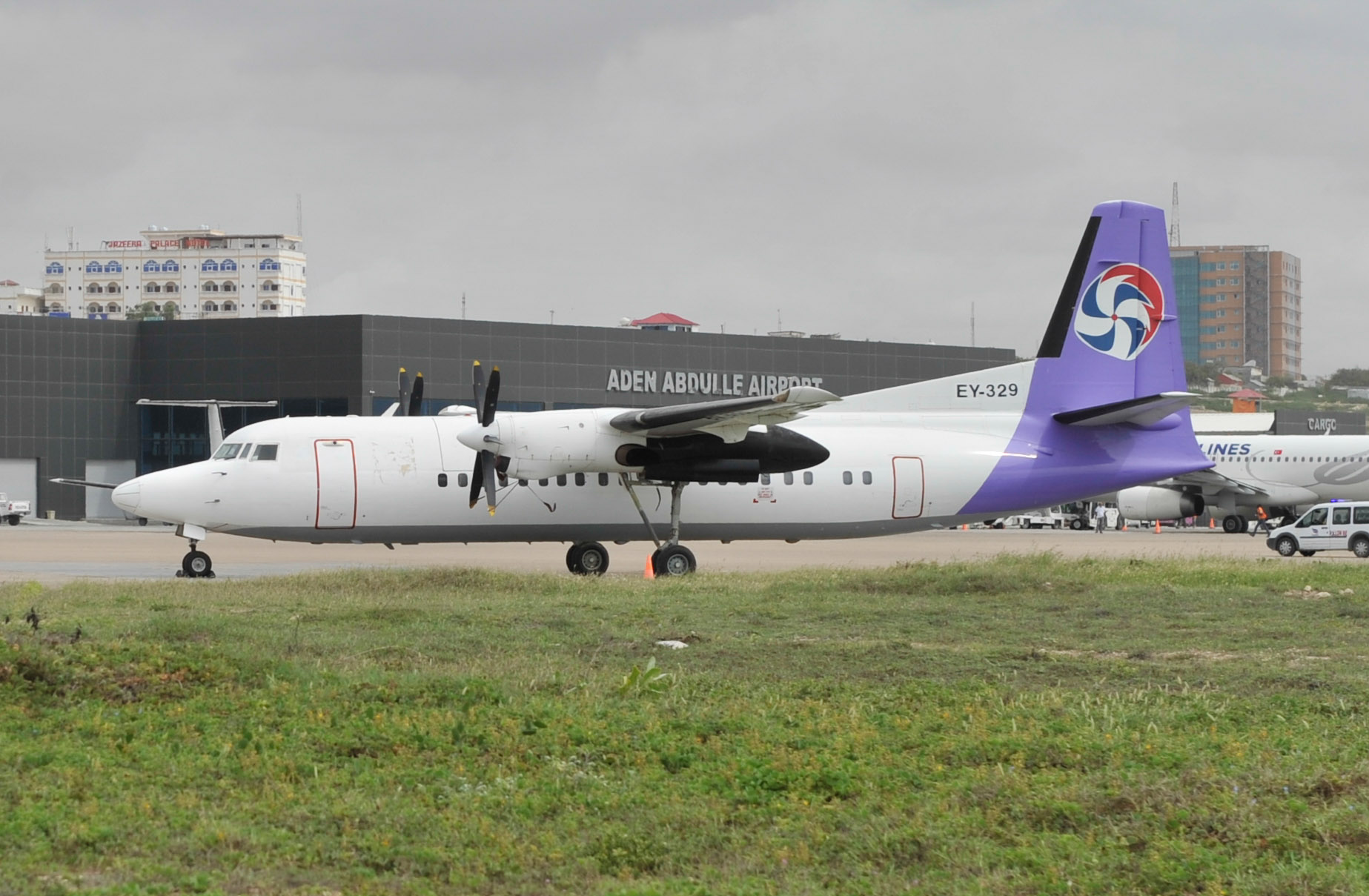
Jubba Airways Fokker 50

=== Current fleet ===
As of September 2026, Jubba Airways operates the following aircraft:

Jubba Airways fleet
Aircraft	In fleet	Orders	Passengers	Notes
Fokker 50	2	—	50	
Boeing 737-300(QC)	1	—	144	
Total	3	—		

=== Former fleet ===
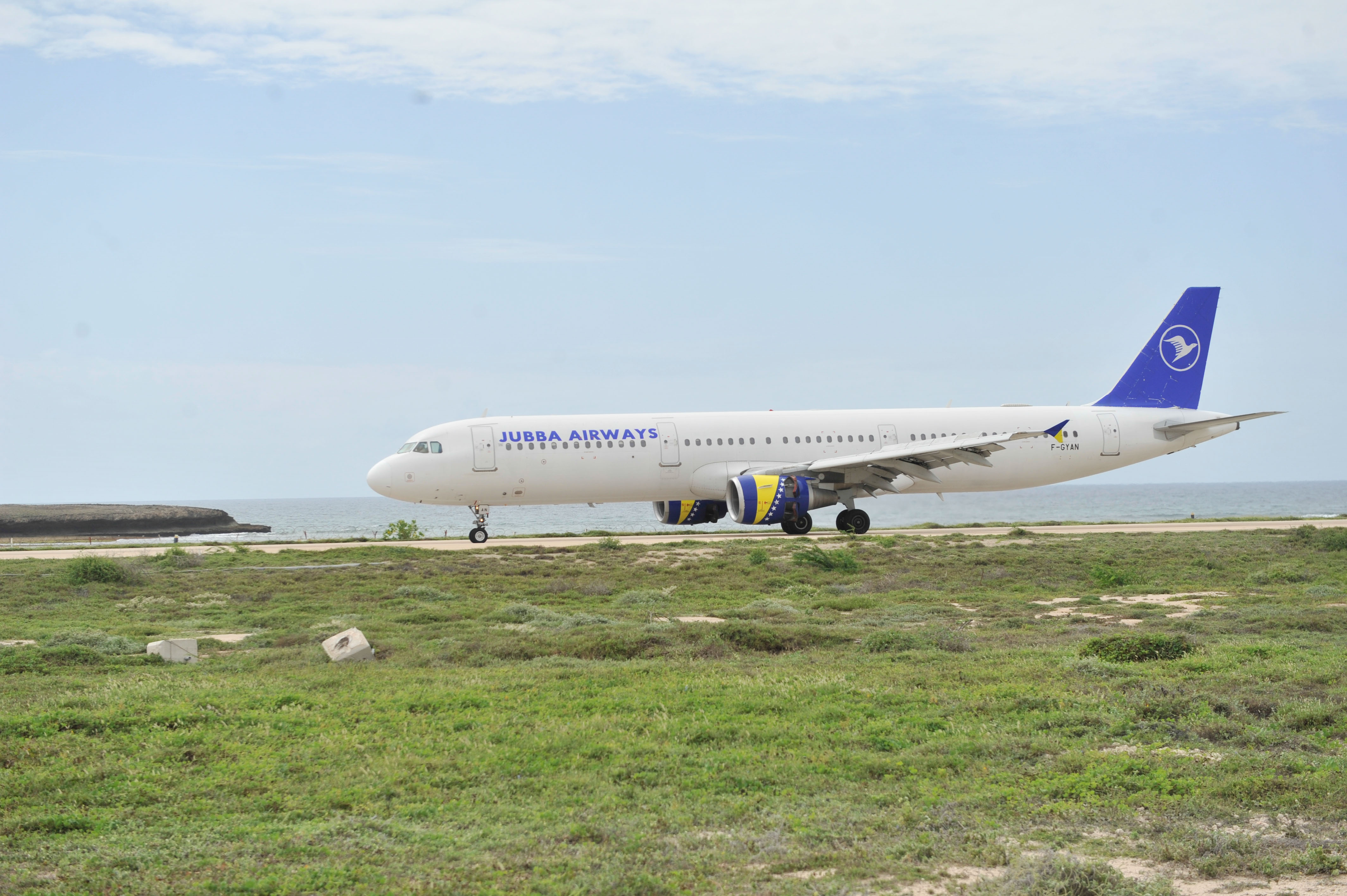
A former leased Jubba Airways Airbus A321-200

The airline previously operated the following aircraft:

- 2 Airbus A320-200
- 1 Airbus A321-100
- 1 Airbus A321-200
- 2 Boeing 737-200
- 1 Boeing 737-300
- 1 Boeing 737-400
- 1 Fokker 50

== Accidents and incidents ==
Date	Location	Aircraft	Tail number	Aircraft damage	Fatalities	Description	Refs
28 April 2012	Hargeisa	Antonov An-24	3X-GEB	W/O	0	On a flight from Hargeisa International Airport in Hargeisa to Abdullahi Yusuf International Airport in Galkayo, an Antonov An-24 blew both right gear main tires, causing the aircraft to veer off the runway. The plane's wing separated from the body. No injuries were reported, although the aircraft was substantially damaged.	
18 July 2022	Mogadishu	Fokker 50	5Y-JXN	W/O	0	2022 Jubba Airways crash: A flight from Baidoa Airport in Baidoa flipped over while landing at Aden Adde International Airport in Mogadishu. All 36 passengers and crew survived the crash while the Fokker 50 was written off.	

== See also ==
- Daallo Airlines

== Bibliography ==
- The Atlantic, Why Does A Country With Few Roads Have a Growing Airline Industry?, 14 July 2013
