= Guriel Airport =

Airport in Somalia

Coordinates: 5°19′03″N 45°59′08″E

Guriel Airport (IATA: GUO) (Somali: Gegada Diyaaradah Guriceel) is a domestic airport serving Guriel, Galgaduud, Somalia.

== Airlines and destinations ==
Airlines	Destinations
Jubba Airways	Mogadishu

== See also ==
- List of airports in Somalia
