= Abdullahi Yusuf Airport =

Airport in Somalia

Abdullahi Yusuf Airport Garoonka Diyaaradaha ee Cabdillahi Yuusuf مطار عبد الله يوسف
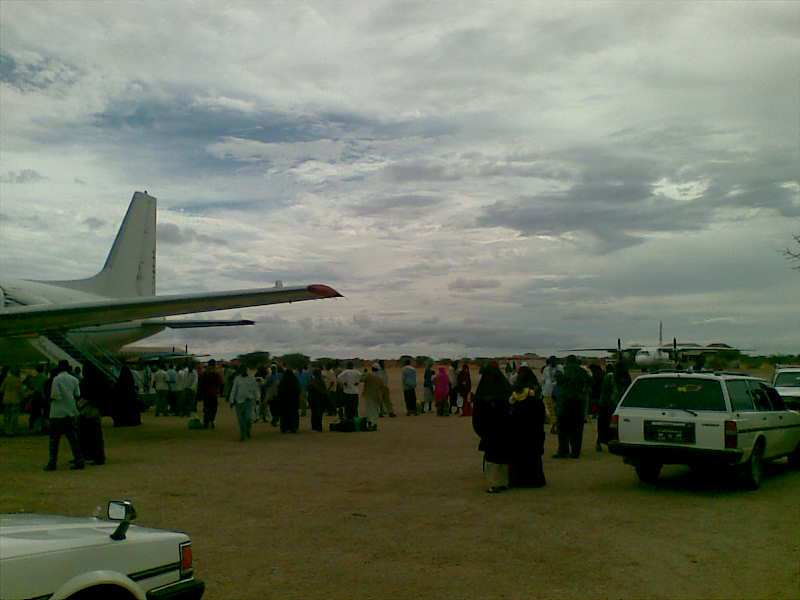
- IATA: GLK; ICAO: HCMR

Summary
- Airport type: Public / military
- Owner: Government of Puntland
- Serves: Galkayo, Somalia
- Elevation AMSL: 975 ft / 297 m
- Coordinates: 06°46′51″N 047°27′16″E

Map
- Location of airport in Somalia

Runways
Direction	Length		Surface
Direction	ft	m	Surface
05L/23R	9,859	3,006	Asphalt
05R/23L	9,859	3,006	Dirt

Abdullahi Yusuf Airport (IATA: GLK, ICAO: HCMR), formerly known as the Galkayo Airport, is an airport located in Galkayo, the capital of the north-central Mudug region of Somalia.

== Overview ==
During the 1982 Ethiopian invasion of Somalia, the airport was bombed by several waves of Ethiopian Air Force jets. The attackers launched bombs and rockets at both the runway and the anti-aircraft defenses protecting it, but missed their targets. The runway which at the time was in the process of being extended, was undamaged by the attack.

Like most of Galkayo, the Abdullahi Yusuf Airport is administered by the autonomous Puntland government. It has acted as a buffer zone between the divided city's two main divisions. Taxes collected by the airport authority are split equally between the Puntland and Galmudug administrations, facilitating relations between the two regional authorities.

On 25 March 2012, the facility was officially renamed in memory of the late Colonel Abdullahi Yusuf Ahmed, the former President of Somalia, who was born in Galkayo.

== Airlines and destinations ==
Airlines	Destinations
Jubba Airways	Garowe, Mogadishu

== Accidents and incidents ==
Date	Location	Aircraft	Tail number	Aircraft damage	Fatalities	Description	Refs
28 April 2012	Galkayo	GR-Avia Antonov	3X-GEB	W/O	0/36	A Jubba Airways aircraft on flight 6J-711 from Hargeisa to Galkayo veered right off runway 05L while landing in clear weather conditions. Captain indicated that his flight crew overflew so as to avoid collision with a goat or dog that had wandered onto the runway. The 32 passengers and 4 crew were not injured. However, the plane incurred significant damage.	

=== Non-aviation security incidents ===
On 7 April 2014 a Briton and a Frenchman working for the United Nations were shot dead by a man in a police uniform while they sat in their car at Galkayo airport. A U.N. mission spokesman said it was not clear who was behind the attack. U.N. Secretary-General Ban Ki-moon and the U.N. Security Council both strongly condemned the attack and called on Somali authorities to bring the perpetrators to justice.

On 2 October 2017 the airport's chief of security, Colonel Abdisalan Sanyare Owke, and his bodyguard, were shot dead by a policeman. The assailant's motive was not immediately clear.
