= Beledweyne Airport =

Airport in Somalia

Ugaas Khalif International Airport Garoonka Diyaaradaha ee Ugaas Khaliif
- IATA: BLW; ICAO: HCMN

Summary
- Airport type: Public
- Serves: Beledweyne, Somalia
- Elevation AMSL: 559 ft / 170 m
- Coordinates: 4°46′00″N 45°14′20″E

Map
- Location of airport in Somalia

Runways
Direction	Length		Surface
Direction	m	ft	Surface
04/22	2,200	7,218	Gravel/sand
- Sources: Logistics Cluster GCM

Ugaas Khaliif International Airport (IATA: BLW, ICAO: HCMN) is an airport serving Beledweyne (also spelled Belet Uen or Beletweyn, Somali: Beletweeyne), the capital city of the Hiran region in Somalia. The airport is in the countryside 2 kilometres (1 mi) northeast of the city.

== Facilities ==
The airport elevation is 559 feet (170 m) above mean sea level. Its only 2,200 by 20 metres (7,218 ft × 66 ft) runway designated 04/22 has a crushed rock and packed sand surface.

As of February 2015, the Djibouti Defense Forces had refurbished the airstrip. The Beledweyne municipality launched a project to further develop the airport in May of that year.

== Demographics/population ==
The broader Beledweyne district has total population of 2 million residents, with the Hawadle subclan of Hawiye well represented making up 75% of the city's population.

The airport was named after the well known Ughaz Khalif who was the Ugas of Xawaadle clan, which is considered to be the major and dominant clan of the Hiiraan region, predominantly Baledwayne.

== Climate ==
Beledweyne has a hot desert climate (Köppen climate classification BWh). Between March and April, the average daily maximum temperature in the city is 36.7 °C (98 °F). In January and February, the average daily minimum temperature is 21.8 °C (71 °F).

Climate data for Beledweyne, Somalia
Month	Jan	Feb	Mar	Apr	May	Jun	Jul	Aug	Sep	Oct	Nov	Dec	Year
Record high °C (°F)	41.5 (106.7)	42.5 (108.5)	43.0 (109.4)	43.0 (109.4)	41.3 (106.3)	39.0 (102.2)	39.0 (102.2)	39.0 (102.2)	40.2 (104.4)	45.0 (113.0)	40.0 (104.0)	42.0 (107.6)	45.0 (113.0)
Mean daily maximum °C (°F)	34.5 (94.1)	35.4 (95.7)	36.7 (98.1)	36.9 (98.4)	34.9 (94.8)	34.0 (93.2)	33.0 (91.4)	33.8 (92.8)	35.3 (95.5)	34.4 (93.9)	34.8 (94.6)	34.5 (94.1)	34.8 (94.6)
Daily mean °C (°F)	28.2 (82.8)	28.7 (83.7)	30.0 (86.0)	30.4 (86.7)	29.2 (84.6)	28.4 (83.1)	27.8 (82.0)	27.7 (81.9)	29.0 (84.2)	28.7 (83.7)	28.5 (83.3)	28.5 (83.3)	28.7 (83.7)
Mean daily minimum °C (°F)	22.0 (71.6)	22.0 (71.6)	23.4 (74.1)	23.9 (75.0)	23.4 (74.1)	22.8 (73.0)	22.6 (72.7)	21.6 (70.9)	22.7 (72.9)	22.6 (72.7)	22.3 (72.1)	22.3 (72.1)	22.6 (72.7)
Record low °C (°F)	16.0 (60.8)	16.5 (61.7)	17.0 (62.6)	16.0 (60.8)	18.0 (64.4)	17.0 (62.6)	17.0 (62.6)	16.3 (61.3)	17.2 (63.0)	17.0 (62.6)	15.0 (59.0)	15.0 (59.0)	15.0 (59.0)
Average precipitation mm (inches)	0 (0)	1 (0.0)	5 (0.2)	48 (1.9)	59 (2.3)	6 (0.2)	3 (0.1)	3 (0.1)	8 (0.3)	51 (2.0)	16 (0.6)	5 (0.2)	204 (8.0)
Average precipitation days (≥ 1.0 mm)	0	0	0	5	5	0	0	0	0	4	2	0	20
Average relative humidity (%)	58	57	57	60	64	61	65	64	59	64	63	62	61
Mean monthly sunshine hours	288.3	276.9	288.3	243.0	272.8	249.0	201.5	232.5	246.0	223.2	243.0	269.7	3,034.2
Mean daily sunshine hours	9.3	9.8	9.3	8.1	8.8	8.3	6.5	7.5	8.2	7.2	8.1	8.7	8.3
Percentage possible sunshine	80	79	65	53	54	61	54	62	62	57	60	69	63
Source 1: Deutscher Wetterdienst
Source 2: Food and Agriculture Organization: Somalia Water and Land Management (percent sunshine)

== Accidents and incidents ==
- 14 July 2020: A Bluebird Aviation Bombardier Dash 8 Q400 (5Y-VVU) was flying on a humanitarian flight from Djibouti to Beletwein, when a donkey crossed the runway as the aircraft was landing in the airport, causing the aircraft to veer off the runway. The plane then caught on fire after the crash. All 3 crew members onboard survived the crash.
