= Hargeisa Airport =

Airport in Hargeisa, Somaliland

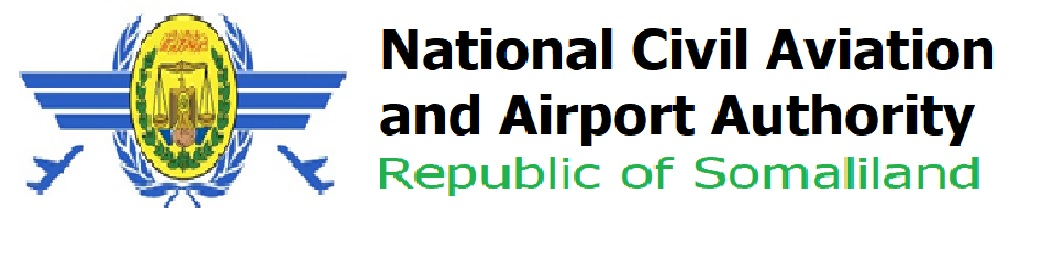
Egal International Airport Madaarka Caalamiga ah ee Cigaal

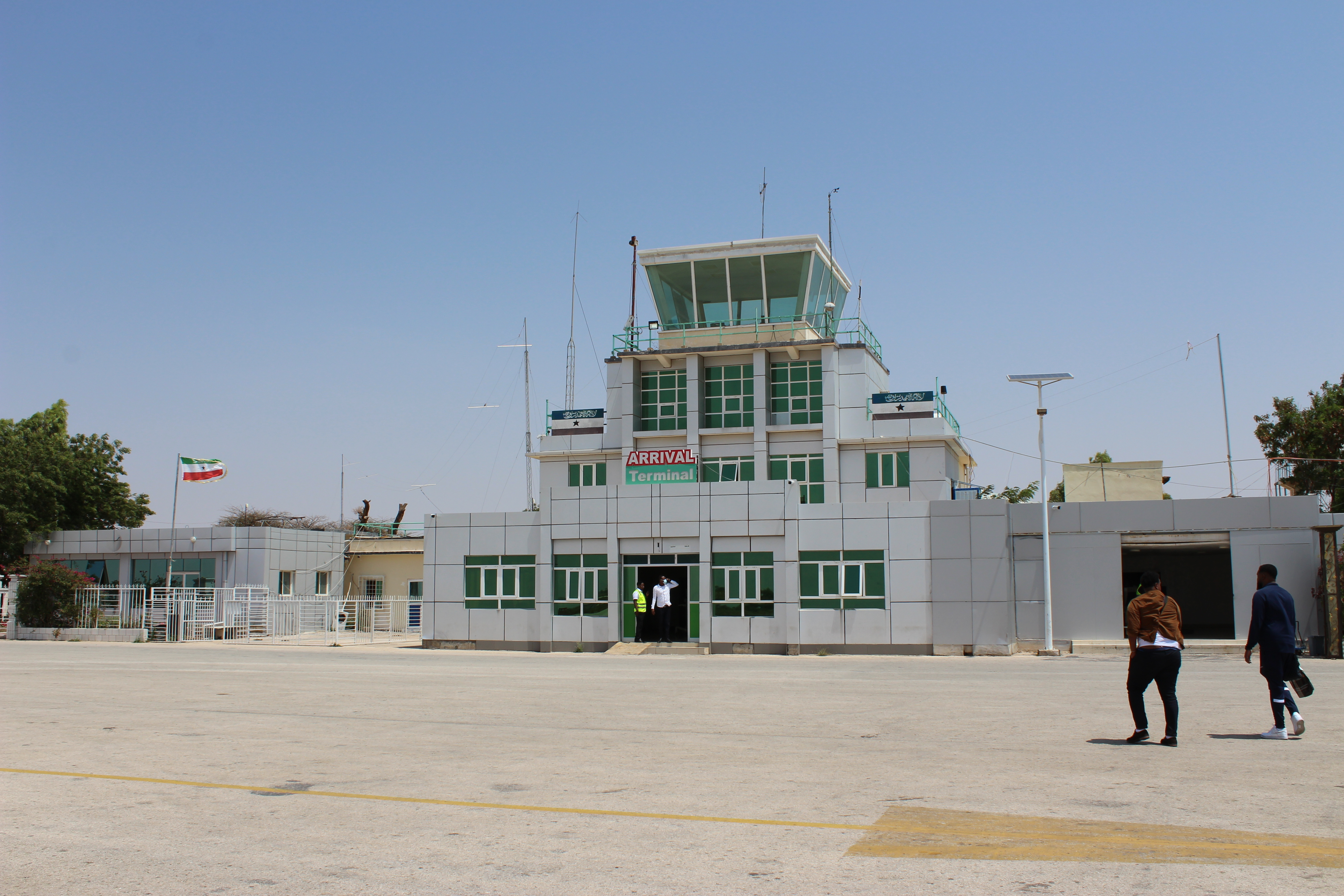
- IATA: HGA; ICAO: HCMH

Summary
- Airport type: Commercial Public Airport - Aviation facility Airport
- Owner: Somaliland Civil Aviation and Airports Authority
- Serves: Hargeisa; Borama; Burco; Arabsiyo
- Elevation AMSL: 4,423 ft (1,348 m)
- Coordinates: 09°31′06″N 044°05′20″E

Map
- Location of airport in Somaliland HGA (Somaliland)

Runways
Direction	Length		Surface
Direction	ft	m	Surface
06/24	12,139	3,700	Asphalt (no ILS)

Egal International Airport (IATA: HGA, ICAO: HCMH) (Somali: Madaarka Caalamiga ah ee Cigaal Arabic: مطار عقال الدولي) is an airport in Hargeisa, the capital of Somaliland, named after Somaliland's second president Muhammad Haji Ibrahim Egal. In 2002 the airport handled 85,800 passengers and 4,300 tons of cargo over a total of 6,120 landings. The airport underwent major renovations in 2012–2013.

== History ==
The airport was opened in 1954 by the British RAF. An expansion program was launched shortly afterwards, and by 1958, a taxiway, parking area and terminal building had been built. The airport was modernized in the 1980s by the Siad Barre administration so as to accommodate larger aircraft and offer more flight destinations.

During the events leading up to and comprising the Somali Civil War in the early 1990s, the airport's infrastructure was significantly damaged. However, the facility was gradually rehabilitated over the next several years.

The airport was later renamed Egal Airport after the veteran politician Muhammad Haji Ibrahim Egal. He served as Somalia's prime minister in the early 1960s during the country's post-independence civilian administration, before later becoming the second president of Somaliland.

In 2012, the airport's routes were temporarily suspended as its runway underwent major renovations, funded by the Somaliland authorities, Kuwait Fund and USAID. The facility was later reopened on 17 August 2013, with enlarged arrival and departure terminals, as well as five new wind turbines. An installed wind data monitoring station will also assist in powering the airport.

== Facilities ==
In June 2014, the Government of Somaliland and the United States Agency for International Development (USAID) inaugurated a new wind energy project at the airport. The new wind power facility is under the authority of the Somaliland Ministry of Energy and Mineral Resources, which will manage it through a public-private partnership and oversee its daily operations. The initiative is part of the larger Partnership for Economic Growth, a bilateral program that has invested over $14 million in Somaliland's energy, livestock and agriculture sectors as well as in private sector development. The partnership aims in particular to establish local renewable energy technologies, with the new wind energy facility expected to offer a more cost-effective alternative to diesel fuel. It is also slated to provide power to both the Hargeisa airport and the surrounding communities.

== Airlines and destinations ==
The following airlines offer scheduled passenger services:

Airlines	Destinations
Air Djibouti	Djibouti
African Express Airways	Berbera, Cairo, Dubai–International, Mogadishu, Nairobi–Jomo Kenyatta, Sharjah
Daallo Airlines	Djibouti, Dubai–International, Jeddah, Mogadishu
Ethiopian Airlines	Addis Ababa
flydubai	Dubai–International
Freedom Airline Express	Mogadishu
Jubba Airways	Bosaso, Dubai–International, Jeddah, Mogadishu

== Ground transport ==
Road systems within the city link towards Hargeisa Airport through Airport Road.

== Facilities ==
- visa Immigration control
- Cafés
- Gift shop
- Bank
- Currency exchange
- car park area
- First aid facilities
- Prayer rooms
- VIP area

== Cargo ==
The following airlines offer scheduled cargo service:

Airlines	Destinations
Ethiopian Cargo	Addis Ababa
Emirates Cargo	Dubai
Astral Aviation	Nairobi

== Hargeisa airport redevelopment contract ==
Somaliland paid 70 million dollars towards Maharat investment company from United Arab Emirates for airport development and possible demolishment of old airport areas with new 2 terminals and 2 floor airport complexes, and new ATCT tower.

== See also ==
- List of airports in Somaliland
