= Kismayo Airport =

Sayid Mohamed Abdule Hassan International Airport Garoonka Diyaaradaha ee Sayid Mohamed Abdule Hassan
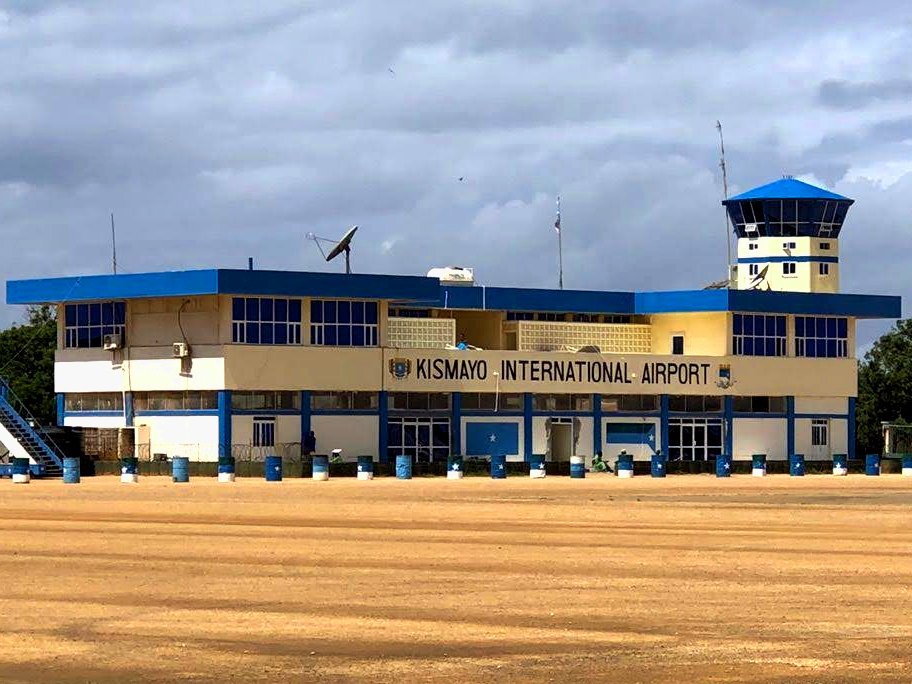
- IATA: KMU; ICAO: HCMK

Summary
- Airport type: Public
- Serves: Kismayo
- Location: Lower Juba, Somalia
- Built: 1974
- Elevation AMSL: 49 ft (15 m)
- Coordinates: 00°23′22″S 042°26′51″E

Map
- Location of airport in Somalia

Runways
Direction	Length		Surface
Direction	m	ft	Surface
05/23	3,688	12,100	Asphalt

Statistics (2013)
- Passengers: 58
- Aircraftmovements: 10

Kismayo Airport (IATA: KMU, ICAO: HCMK), also known as Kisimayu Airport, is an international airport serving Kismayo, the capital city of the Lower Juba region in Somalia. It is located in southern Jubaland, an autonomous region in Somalia.

The airport was first seen under construction in 1973 by the Central Intelligence Agency. It was meant to replace the natural-surface old Kismayo Airfield that had been constructed during the Italian protectorate in the 1930s.

In August 2013, the Kismayo Airport was officially brought under the Juba Interim Administration. Per agreement, management of the facility was scheduled to be transferred to the Federal Government of Somalia after a period of six months. Revenues and resources generated from the airport will also be earmarked for Jubaland's service delivery and security sectors as well as local institutional development.

== Facilities ==
The airport resides at an elevation of 49 feet (15 m) above mean sea level. It has one asphalt paved runway designated 05/23 which is 3,688 metres (12,100 ft) long.

== Military presence ==
The airport is home to Camp Kismayo, a military base hosting Somali Armed Forces and African Union forces, and also hosts a large UN compound. The airport has received flights from the 75th Expeditionary Airlift Squadron to resupply Danab Brigade and United States special operations forces operating in the region.

== Airlines and destinations ==
Airlines	Destinations
African Express Airways	Mogadishu
Freedom Airlines	Mogadishu, Nairobi–Jomo Kenyatta
Jubba Airways	Mogadishu

== Gallery ==
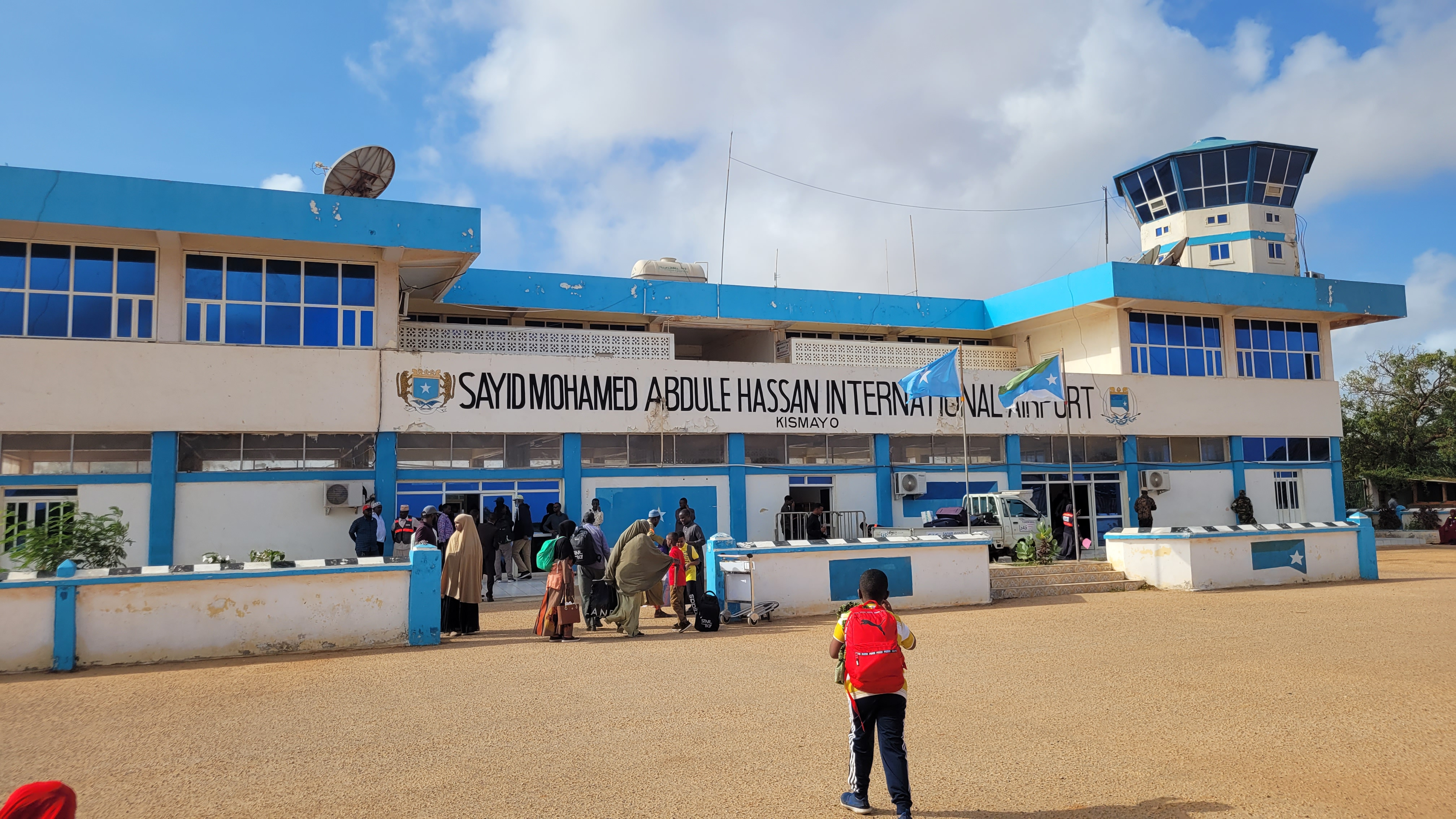
Passengers enter the main terminal at Kismayo Airport, July 22nd, 2021.

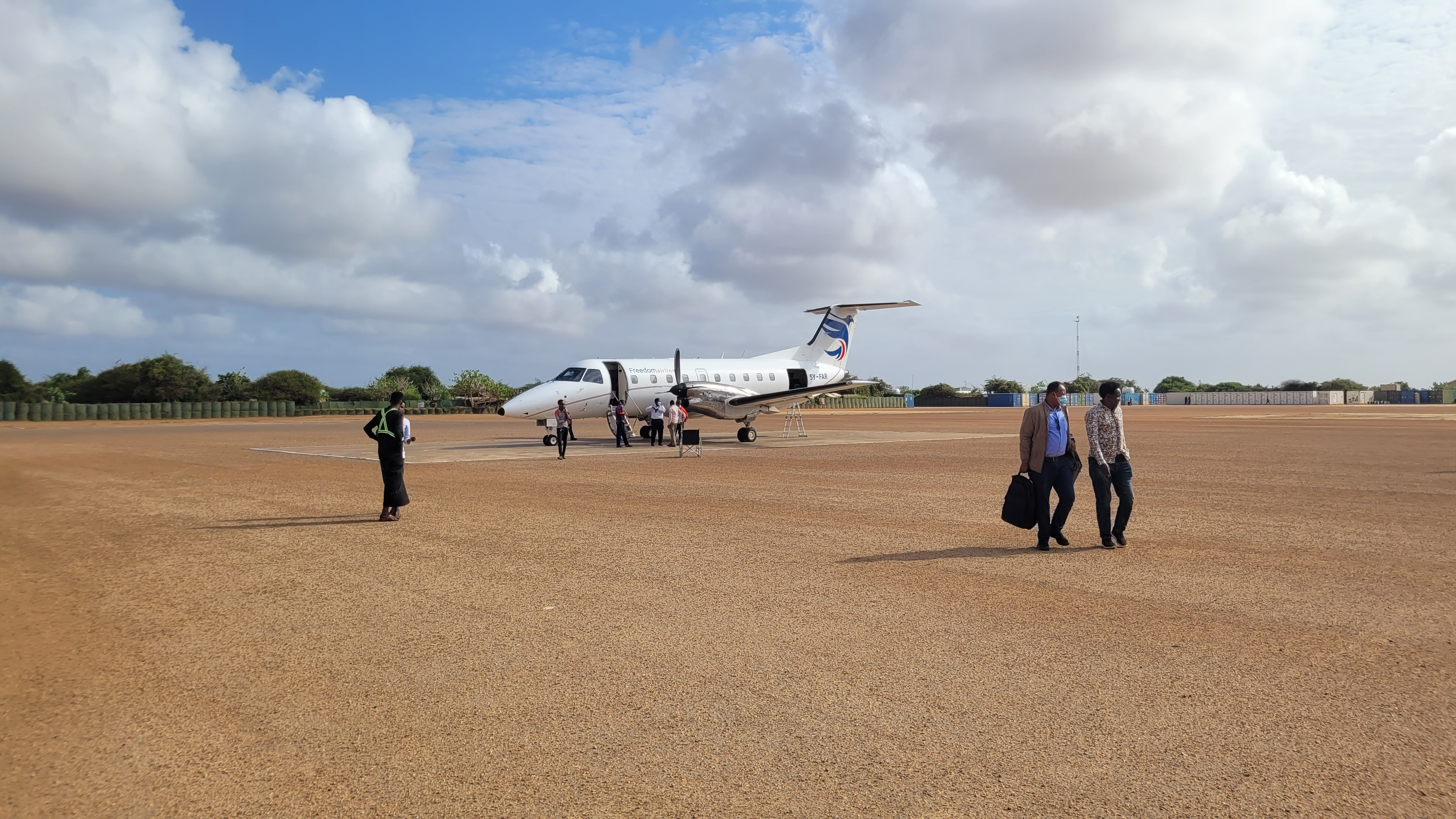
Embraer 120 parked on apron at Kismayo Airport, July 22nd, 2021.

== See also ==
- List of airports in Somalia
