= Bosnian Wand Airlines =

Airline of Bosnia and Herzegovina

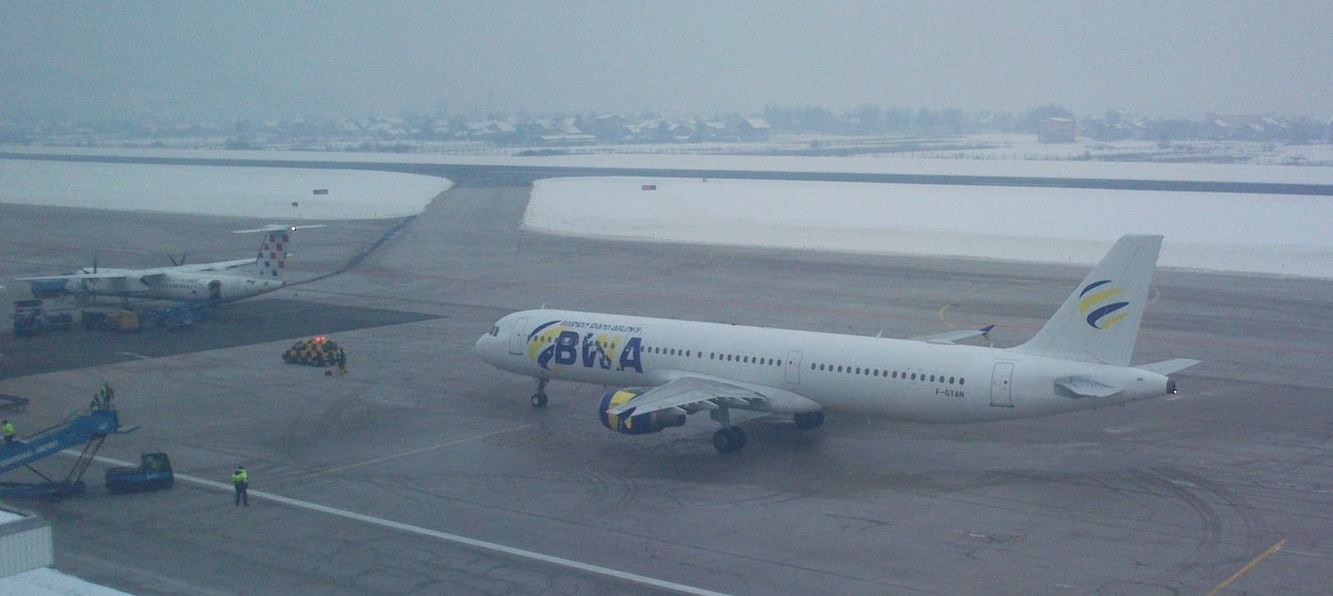
- Airbus A321-200
IATA	ICAO	Call sign
H3	HRM	HERMES
- Founded: 2014
- Commenced operations: January 2015
- Ceased operations: February 2015
- Hubs: Sarajevo International Airport
- Destinations: 12
- Parent company: Wand Group
- Headquarters: Sarajevo, Bosnia and Herzegovina
- Website: www.bwairlines.com

Bosnian Wand Airlines was an airline based at Sarajevo International Airport in Bosnia and Herzegovina, that operated scheduled flights to European and Middle Eastern destinations. It was forced to suspend operations after only a few weeks of operations.

== History ==
Bosnian Wand Airlines was founded on 24 June 2014 in Gornje Dubrave-Živinice with the aim to connect Bosnia and Herzegovina with important destinations in the world and to establish a functional air network in competition with B&H Airlines. In the meantime, preregistration of the company had been done and the headquarters had been located in Sarajevo.

Bosnian Wand Airlines planned to obtain its own air operator's certificate while all flights were to be operated by Hermes Airlines. The first flight was conducted on 25 January 2015 from Sarajevo to Athens.

On 10 February 2015, the airline was ordered by the Bosnian authorities to suspend operations as it did not hold the necessary certificate and had failed to explain the affiliation with Hermes Airlines. As of 25 April 2015, the airline had not resumed operations.

== Destinations ==
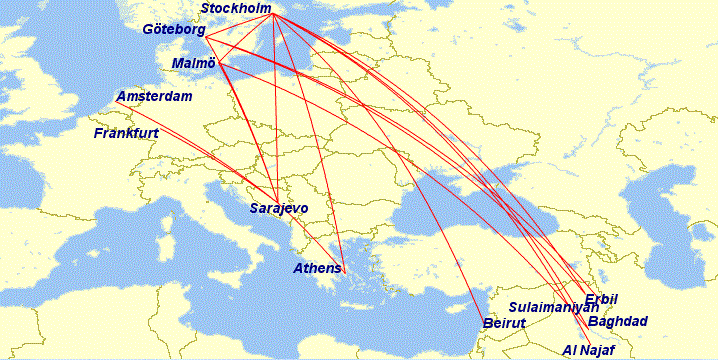
Bosnian Wand Airlines routes as of January 2015

From January to February 2015, Bosnian Wand Airlines offered flights to the following destinations:

City	Country	IATA	ICAO	Airport
Al Najaf	Iraq	NJF	ORNI	Al Najaf International Airport
Amsterdam	Netherlands	AMS	EHAM	Amsterdam Airport Schiphol
Athens	Greece	ATH	LGAV	Athens International Airport
Baghdad	Iraq	BGW	ORBI	Baghdad International Airport
Beirut	Lebanon	BEY	OLBA	Beirut–Rafic Hariri International Airport
Erbil	Iraq	EBL	ORER	Erbil International Airport
Frankfurt	Germany	FRA	EDDF	Frankfurt Airport
Gothenburg	Sweden	GOT	ESGG	Göteborg Landvetter Airport
Malmö	Sweden	MMX	ESMS	Malmö Airport
Sarajevo	Bosnia and Herzegovina	SJJ	LQSA	Sarajevo International Airport
Stockholm	Sweden	ARN	ESSA	Stockholm Arlanda Airport
Sulaimaniyah	Iraq	ISU	ORSU	Sulaimaniyah International Airport

== Fleet ==
As Bosnian Wand Airlines did not own an operations certificate, all flights were operated by Hermes Airlines using their aircraft. The fleet consisted of the following aircraft:

Bosnian Wand Airlines fleet
Aircraft	In fleet	Orders	Passengers	Notes
Airbus A321-200	1	-	220	operated by Hermes Airlines
Total	1	-		
