= List of busiest airports by passenger traffic (2010–2019) =

Below is a list of busiest airports by passenger traffic from 2010 to 2019.

== 2019 statistics ==
Figures as reported by airports are as follows:

Rank	Airport	Location	Country	Code (IATA/ICAO)	Total passengers	Rank change	% change
1.	(United States) Hartsfield–Jackson Atlanta International Airport	Atlanta, Georgia	United States	ATL/KATL	110,531,300	0	2.9%
2.	(China) Beijing Capital International Airport	Chaoyang-Shunyi, Beijing	China	PEK/ZBAA	100,011,438	0	1.0%
3.	(United States) Los Angeles International Airport	Los Angeles, California	United States	LAX/KLAX	88,068,013	1	0.6%
4.	(United Arab Emirates) Dubai International Airport	Garhoud, Dubai	United Arab Emirates	DXB/OMDB	86,396,757	1	3.1%
5.	(Japan) Tokyo Haneda Airport	Ōta, Tokyo	Japan	HND/RJTT	85,505,054	0	1.7%
6.	(United States) O'Hare International Airport	Chicago, Illinois	United States	ORD/KORD	84,649,115	0	1.7%
7.	(United Kingdom) Heathrow Airport	Hillingdon, London	United Kingdom	LHR/EGLL	80,888,305	0	1.0%
8.	(China) Shanghai Pudong International Airport	Pudong, Shanghai	China	PVG/ZSPD	76,153,455	1	2.9%
9.	(France) Charles de Gaulle Airport	Roissy-en-France, Île-de-France	France	CDG/LFPG	76,150,009	1	5.4%
10.	(United States) Dallas/Fort Worth International Airport	Dallas-Fort Worth, Texas	United States	DFW/KDFW	75,066,956	5	8.6%
11.	(China) Guangzhou Baiyun International Airport	Baiyun-Huadu, Guangzhou, Guangdong	China	CAN/ZGGG	73,386,153	2	5.2%
12.	(Netherlands) Amsterdam Airport Schiphol	Haarlemmermeer, North Holland	Netherlands	AMS/EHAM	71,706,999	1	0.9%
13.	Hong Kong International Airport	Chek Lap Kok, New Territories	Hong Kong	HKG/VHHH	71,415,245	5	4.2%
14.	(South Korea) Seoul Incheon International Airport	Incheon	South Korea	ICN/RKSI	71,204,153	3	4.2%
15.	(Germany) Frankfurt Airport	Frankfurt, Hesse	Germany	FRA/EDDF	70,556,072	1	1.5%
16.	(United States) Denver International Airport	Denver, Colorado	United States	DEN/KDEN	69,015,703	4	7.0%
17.	(India) Indira Gandhi International Airport	Delhi	India	DEL/VIDP	68,490,731	5	2.0%
18.	Singapore Changi Airport	Changi, East Region	Singapore	SIN/WSSS	68,283,000	1	4.0%
19.	(Thailand) Suvarnabhumi Airport	Bang Phli, Samut Prakan	Thailand	BKK/VTBS	65,421,844	2	3.2%
20.	(United States) John F. Kennedy International Airport	Queens, New York, New York	United States	JFK/KJFK	62,551,072	2	1.5%
21.	(Malaysia) Kuala Lumpur International Airport	Sepang, Selangor	Malaysia	KUL/WMKK	62,336,469	2	3.9%
22.	(Spain) Madrid Barajas Airport	Barajas, Madrid	Spain	MAD/LEMD	61,707,469	2	6.6%
23.	(United States) San Francisco International Airport	San Mateo County, California	United States	SFO/KSFO	57,418,574	2	0.6%
24.	(China) Chengdu Shuangliu International Airport	Shuangliu-Wuhou, Chengdu, Sichuan	China	CTU/ZUUU	55,858,552	2	5.5%
25.	(Indonesia) Soekarno–Hatta International Airport	Tangerang, Banten	Indonesia	CGK/WIII	54,496,625	7	17.0%
26.	(China) Shenzhen Bao'an International Airport	Bao'an, Shenzhen, Guangdong	China	SZX/ZGSZ	52,931,925	6	7.3%
27.	(Spain) Barcelona–El Prat Airport	Barcelona	Spain	BCN/LEBL	52,663,623	0	5.0%
28.	(Turkey) Istanbul Airport	Arnavutköy, Istanbul	Turkey	IST/LTFM	52,009,220	New entry to replace Istanbul Atatürk Airport	
29.	(United States) Seattle–Tacoma International Airport	SeaTac, Washington	United States	SEA/KSEA	51,829,239	0	4.0%
30.	(United States) McCarran International Airport	Las Vegas, Nevada	United States	LAS/KLAS	51,691,066	0	3.7%
31.	(United States) Orlando International Airport	Orlando, Florida	United States	MCO/KMCO	50,613,072	3	6.1%
32.	(Canada) Toronto Pearson International Airport	Mississauga, Ontario	Canada	YYZ/CYYZ	50,496,804	1	2.0%
33.	Mexico City International Airport	Venustiano Carranza, Mexico City	Mexico	MEX/MMMX	50,308,049	0	5.5%
34.	(United States) Charlotte Douglas International Airport	Charlotte, North Carolina	United States	CLT/KCLT	50,168,783	3	8.0%
35.	(Russia) Sheremetyevo International Airport	Khimki, Moscow Oblast	Russia	SVO/UUEE	49,932,752	6	8.9%
36.	Taiwan Taoyuan International Airport	Dayuan, Taoyuan	Taiwan	TPE/RCTP	48,689,372	0	4.6%
37.	(China) Kunming Changshui International Airport	Guandu, Kunming, Yunnan	China	KMG/ZPPP	48,076,238	2	2.1%
38.	(Germany) Munich Airport	Freising, Bavaria	Germany	MUC/EDDM	47,941,348	0	3.7%
39.	(Philippines) Ninoy Aquino International Airport	Pasay/Parañaque, Metro Manila	Philippines	MNL/RPLL	47,898,046	3	6.4%
40.	(China) Xi'an Xianyang International Airport	Weicheng, Xianyang, Shaanxi	China	XIY/ZLXY	47,220,547	5	5.6%
41.	(India) Chhatrapati Shivaji Maharaj International Airport	Mumbai, Maharashtra	India	BOM/VABB	47,055,740	13	5.7%
42.	(United Kingdom) London Gatwick Airport	Crawley, West Sussex	United Kingdom	LGW/EGKK	46,576,473	3	0.3%
43.	(United States) Newark Liberty International Airport	Newark, New Jersey	United States	EWR/KEWR	46,336,452	3	1.1%
44.	(United States) Phoenix Sky Harbor International Airport	Phoenix, Arizona	United States	PHX/KPHX	46,287,790	0	3.0%
45.	(United States) Miami International Airport	Miami-Dade County, Florida	United States	MIA/KMIA	45,924,466	2	2.0%
46.	(China) Shanghai Hongqiao International Airport	Changning-Minhang, Shanghai	China	SHA/ZSSS	45,637,882	2	4.6%
47.	(United States) George Bush Intercontinental Airport	Houston, Texas	United States	IAH/KIAH	44,990,399	0	3.4%
48.	(China) Chongqing Jiangbei International Airport	Yubei, Chongqing	China	CKG/ZUCK	44,786,722	?	7.7%
49.	(Australia) Sydney Airport	Mascot, New South Wales	Australia	SYD/YSSY	44,446,838	3	0.1%
50.	(Japan) Narita International Airport	Narita, Chiba	Japan	NRT/RJAA	44,340,847	0	4.2%

== 2018 statistics ==
Figures as reported by airports are as follows:

Rank	Airport	Location	Country	Code (IATA/ICAO)	Total passengers	Rank Change	% change
1.	(United States) Hartsfield–Jackson Atlanta International Airport	Atlanta, Georgia	United States	ATL/KATL	107,394,029	0	3.3%
2.	(China) Beijing Capital International Airport	Chaoyang-Shunyi, Beijing	China	PEK/ZBAA	100,983,290	0	5.4%
3.	(United Arab Emirates) Dubai International Airport	Garhoud, Dubai	United Arab Emirates	DXB/OMDB	89,149,387	0	1.0%
4.	(United States) Los Angeles International Airport	Los Angeles, California	United States	LAX/KLAX	87,534,384	1	3.5%
5.	(Japan) Tokyo Haneda Airport	Ōta, Tokyo	Japan	HND/RJTT	86,942,794	1	4.4%
6.	(United States) O'Hare International Airport	Chicago, Illinois	United States	ORD/KORD	83,245,472	0	4.3%
7.	(United Kingdom) Heathrow Airport	Hillingdon, London	United Kingdom	LHR/EGLL	80,126,320	0	2.7%
8.	Hong Kong International Airport	Chek Lap Kok, Islands, New Territories	China	HKG/VHHH	74,515,927	0	2.6%
9.	(China) Shanghai Pudong International Airport	Pudong, Shanghai	China	PVG/ZSPD	74,006,331	0	5.7%
10.	(France) Charles de Gaulle Airport	Roissy-en-France, Île-de-France	France	CDG/LFPG	72,229,723	0	4.0%
11.	(Netherlands) Amsterdam Airport Schiphol	Haarlemmermeer, North Holland	Netherlands	AMS/EHAM	71,053,147	0	3.7%
12.	(India) Indira Gandhi International Airport	Delhi	India	DEL/VIDP	69,900,938	4	10.2%
13.	(China) Guangzhou Baiyun International Airport	Baiyun-Huadu, Guangzhou, Guangdong	China	CAN/ZGGG	69,743,211	0	5.9%
14.	(Germany) Frankfurt Airport	Frankfurt, Hesse	Germany	FRA/EDDF	69,510,269	0	7.8%
15.	(United States) Dallas/Fort Worth International Airport	Dallas-Fort Worth, Texas	United States	DFW/KDFW	69,112,607	3	3.0%
16.	(Turkey) Istanbul Atatürk Airport	Yeşilköy, Istanbul	Turkey	IST/LTBA	68,360,648	1	6.6%
17.	(South Korea) Seoul Incheon International Airport	Incheon	South Korea	ICN/RKSI	68,350,784	2	10.0%
18.	(Indonesia) Soekarno–Hatta International Airport	Tangerang, Banten	Indonesia	CGK/WIII	65,667,506	1	6.2%
19.	Singapore Changi Airport	Changi, East Region	Singapore	SIN/WSSS	65,628,000	1	5.5%
20.	(United States) Denver International Airport	Denver, Colorado	United States	DEN/KDEN	64,494,613	0	5.1%
21.	(Thailand) Suvarnabhumi Airport	Bang Phli, Samut Prakan	Thailand	BKK/VTBS	63,378,923	0	4.1%
22.	(United States) John F. Kennedy International Airport	Queens, New York, New York	United States	JFK/KJFK	61,623,756	0	3.6%
23.	(Malaysia) Kuala Lumpur International Airport	Sepang, Selangor	Malaysia	KUL/WMKK	60,013,397	0	2.5%
24.	(Spain) Madrid Barajas Airport	Barajas, Madrid	Spain	MAD/LEMD	57,862,951	1	8.4%
25.	(United States) San Francisco International Airport	San Mateo County, California	United States	SFO/KSFO	57,708,196	1	3.4%
26.	(China) Chengdu Shuangliu International Airport	Shuangliu-Wuhou, Chengdu, Sichuan	China	CTU/ZUUU	52,950,529	0	6.3%
27.	(Spain) Barcelona–El Prat Airport	Barcelona	Spain	BCN/LEBL	50,148,228	1	6.1%
28.	(India) Chhatrapati Shivaji Maharaj International Airport	Mumbai, Maharashtra	India	BOM/VABB	49,876,769	1	5.7%
29.	(United States) McCarran International Airport	Las Vegas, Nevada	United States	LAS/KLAS	49,863,090	2	2.7%
30.	(United States) Seattle–Tacoma International Airport	SeaTac, Washington	United States	SEA/KSEA	49,849,520	1	6.2%
31.	(Canada) Toronto Pearson International Airport	Mississauga, Ontario	Canada	YYZ/CYYZ	49,467,097	1	5.0%
32.	(China) Shenzhen Bao'an International Airport	Bao'an, Shenzhen, Guangdong	China	SZX/ZGSZ	49,348,950	2	8.3%
33.	Mexico City International Airport	Venustiano Carranza, Mexico City	Mexico	MEX/MMMX	47,700,834	3	6.6%
34.	(United States) Orlando International Airport	Orlando, Florida	United States	MCO/KMCO	47,694,573	5	7.2%
35.	(China) Kunming Changshui International Airport	Guandu, Kunming, Yunnan	China	KMG/ZPPP	47,215,986	2	5.6%
36.	Taiwan Taoyuan International Airport	Dayuan, Taoyuan	Taiwan	TPE/RCTP	46,535,180	1	3.7%
37.	(United States) Charlotte Douglas International Airport	Charlotte, North Carolina	United States	CLT/KCLT	46,446,721	5	1.2%
38.	(United Kingdom) London Gatwick Airport	Crawley, West Sussex	United Kingdom	LGW/EGKK	46,432,630	6	1.9%
39.	(Germany) Munich Airport	Freising, Bavaria	Germany	MUC/EDDM	46,253,623	1	3.8%
40.	(United States) Newark Liberty International Airport	Newark, New Jersey	United States	EWR/KEWR	46,065,175	3	6.6%
41.	(Russia) Sheremetyevo International Airport	Khimki, Moscow Oblast	Russia	SVO/UUEE	45,836,255	9	14.3%
42.	(United States) Miami International Airport	Miami-Dade County, Florida	United States	MIA/KMIA	45,044,312	2	2.1%
43.	(United States) Phoenix Sky Harbor International Airport	Phoenix, Arizona	United States	PHX/KPHX	44,943,686	2	2.3%
44.	(China) Xi'an Xianyang International Airport	Weicheng, Xianyang, Shaanxi	China	XIY/ZLXY	44,653,927	2	6.7%
45.	(Philippines) Ninoy Aquino International Airport	Pasay/Parañaque, Metro Manila	Philippines	MNL/RPLL	44,488,321	1	5.9%
46.	(Australia) Sydney Airport	Mascot, New South Wales	Australia	SYD/YSSY	44,475,976	4	2.5%
47.	(United States) George Bush Intercontinental Airport	Houston, Texas	United States	IAH/KIAH	43,807,539	1	7.7%
48.	(China) Shanghai Hongqiao International Airport	Changning-Minhang, Shanghai	China	SHA/ZSSS	43,628,004	3	4.2%
49.	(Italy) Rome–Fiumicino International Airport "Leonardo da Vinci"	Rome-Fiumicino, Lazio	Italy	FCO/LIRF	42,991,056	2	4.9%
50.	(Japan) Narita International Airport	Narita, Chiba	Japan	NRT/RJAA	42,549,173	1	4.7%

== 2017 statistics ==
Airports Council International's full-year figures are as follows:

Rank	Airport	Location	Country	Code (IATA/ICAO)	Total passengers	Rank Change	% change
1.	(United States) Hartsfield–Jackson Atlanta International Airport	Atlanta, Georgia	United States	ATL/KATL	103,902,992	0	0.3%
2.	(China) Beijing Capital International Airport	Chaoyang-Shunyi, Beijing	China	PEK/ZBAA	95,786,442	0	1.5%
3.	(United Arab Emirates) Dubai International Airport	Garhoud, Dubai	United Arab Emirates	DXB/OMDB	88,242,099	0	5.5%
4.	(United States) Los Angeles International Airport	Los Angeles, California	United States	LAX/KLAX	84,557,968	0	4.5%
5.	(United States) O'Hare International Airport	Chicago, Illinois	United States	ORD/KORD	79,828,183	0	2.4%
6.	(United Kingdom) Heathrow Airport	Hillingdon, London	United Kingdom	LHR/EGLL	78,014,598	0	3.0%
7.	(Japan) Tokyo Haneda Airport	Ōta, Tokyo	Japan	HND/RJTT	76,476,251	2	4.0%
8.	Hong Kong International Airport	Chek Lap Kok, Islands, New Territories	China	HKG/VHHH	72,665,078	0	3.4%
9.	(China) Shanghai Pudong International Airport	Pudong, Shanghai	China	PVG/ZSPD	70,001,237	0	6.1%
10.	(France) Charles de Gaulle Airport	Roissy-en-France, Île-de-France	France	CDG/LFPG	69,471,442	0	5.4%
11.	(Netherlands) Amsterdam Airport Schiphol	Haarlemmermeer, North Holland	The Netherlands	AMS/EHAM	68,515,425	1	7.7%
12.	(United States) Dallas/Fort Worth International Airport	Dallas-Fort Worth, Texas	United States	DFW/KDFW	67,092,194	1	2.3%
13.	(China) Guangzhou Baiyun International Airport	Baiyun-Huadu, Guangzhou, Guangdong	China	CAN/ZGGG	65,887,473	2	10.3%
14.	(Germany) Frankfurt Airport	Frankfurt, Hesse	Germany	FRA/EDDF	64,500,386	1	6.1%
15.	(Turkey) Istanbul Atatürk Airport	Yeşilköy, Istanbul	Turkey	IST/LTBA	63,859,785	1	5.9%
16.	(India) Indira Gandhi International Airport	Delhi	India	DEL/VIDP	63,451,503	5	14.1%
17.	(Indonesia) Soekarno-Hatta International Airport	Tangerang, Banten	Indonesia	CGK/WIII	63,015,620	5	8.3%
18.	Singapore Changi Airport	Changi, East Region	Singapore	SIN/WSSS	62,220,000	1	6.0%
19.	(South Korea) Seoul Incheon International Airport	Incheon	Republic of Korea	ICN/RKSI	62,157,834	0	7.5%
20.	(United States) Denver International Airport	Denver, Colorado	United States	DEN/KDEN	61,379,396	2	5.3%
21.	(Thailand) Suvarnabhumi Airport	Bang Phli, Samut Prakan	Thailand	BKK/VTBS	60,860,557	1	8.9%
22.	(United States) John F. Kennedy International Airport	Queens, New York, New York	United States	JFK/KJFK	59,392,500	6	0.5%
23.	(Malaysia) Kuala Lumpur International Airport	Sepang, Selangor	Malaysia	KUL/WMKK	58,558,440	1	11.2%
24.	(United States) San Francisco International Airport	San Mateo County, California	United States	SFO/KSFO	55,822,129	1	5.1%
25.	(Spain) Madrid Barajas Airport	Barajas, Madrid	Spain	MAD/LEMD	53,386,075	0	5.9%
26.	(China) Chengdu Shuangliu International Airport	Shuangliu-Wuhou, Chengdu, Sichuan	China	CTU/ZUUU	49,801,693	1	8.2%
27.	(United States) McCarran International Airport	Las Vegas, Nevada	United States	LAS/KLAS	48,566,803	1	2.3%
28.	(Spain) Barcelona–El Prat Airport	Barcelona	Spain	BCN/LEBL	47,262,826	5	7.1%
29.	(India) Chhatrapati Shivaji Maharaj International Airport	Mumbai, Maharashtra	India	BOM/VABB	47,204,259	0	5.7%
30.	(Canada) Toronto Pearson International Airport	Mississauga, Ontario	Canada	YYZ/CYYZ	47,054,696	2	6.2%
31.	(United States) Seattle–Tacoma International Airport	SeaTac, Washington	United States	SEA/KSEA	46,934,194	3	2.6%
32.	(United States) Charlotte Douglas International Airport	Charlotte, North Carolina	United States	CLT/KCLT	45,909,899	1	3.4%
33.	(United Kingdom) London Gatwick Airport	Crawley, West Sussex	United Kingdom	LGW/EGKK	45,561,694	2	5.3%
34.	(China) Shenzhen Bao'an International Airport	Bao'an, Shenzhen, Guangdong	China	SZX/ZGSZ	45,558,409	6	8.5%
35.	Taiwan Taoyuan International Airport	Dayuan, Taoyuan	Taiwan	TPE/RCTP	44,878,703	1	6.1%
36.	Mexico City International Airport	Venustiano Carranza, Mexico City	Mexico	MEX/MMMX	44,732,418	8	8.0%
37.	(China) Kunming Changshui International Airport	Guandu, Kunming, Yunnan	China	KMG/ZPPP	44,729,736	2	6.6%
38.	(Germany) Munich Airport	Freising, Bavaria	Germany	MUC/EDDM	44,577,241	1	5.5%
39.	(United States) Orlando International Airport	Orlando, Florida	United States	MCO/KMCO	44,511,265	2	6.2%
40.	(United States) Miami International Airport	Miami-Dade County, Florida	United States	MIA/KMIA	44,071,313	10	1.2%
41.	(United States) Phoenix Sky Harbor International Airport	Phoenix, Arizona	United States	PHX/KPHX	43,921,670	7	1.2%
42.	(Australia) Sydney Airport	Mascot, Sydney, New South Wales	Australia	SYD/YSSY	43,410,355	4	3.4%
43.	(United States) Newark Liberty International Airport	Newark, New Jersey	United States	EWR/KEWR	43,393,499	3	7.0%
44.	(Philippines) Ninoy Aquino International Airport	Pasay/Parañaque, Metro Manila	Philippines	MNL/RPLL	42,022,484	3	6.2%
45.	(China) Shanghai Hongqiao International Airport	Changning-Minhang, Shanghai	China	SHA/ZSSS	41,884,059	0	3.5%
46.	(China) Xi'an Xianyang International Airport	Weicheng, Xianyang, Shaanxi	China	XIY/ZLXY	41,857,406	?	13.2%
47.	(Italy) Rome–Fiumicino International Airport "Leonardo da Vinci"	Rome-Fiumicino, Lazio	Italy	FCO/LIRF	40,968,756	5	1.8%
48.	(United States) George Bush Intercontinental Airport	Houston, Texas	United States	IAH/KIAH	40,696,189	5	2.2%
49.	(Japan) Narita International Airport	Narita, Chiba	Japan	NRT/RJAA	40,631,193	1	4.2%
50.	(Russia) Sheremetyevo International Airport	Khimki, Moscow Oblast	Russia	SVO/UUEE	40,092,806	?	17.8%

== 2016 statistics ==
Airports Council International's full-year figures are as follows:

Rank	Airport	Location	Country	Code (IATA/ICAO)	Total passengers	Rank change	% change
1.	(United States) Hartsfield–Jackson Atlanta International Airport	Atlanta, Georgia	United States	ATL/KATL	104,171,935	0	2.6%
2.	(China) Beijing Capital International Airport	Chaoyang-Shunyi, Beijing	China	PEK/ZBAA	94,393,454	0	5.0%
3.	(United Arab Emirates) Dubai International Airport	Garhoud, Dubai	United Arab Emirates	DXB/OMDB	83,654,250	0	7.2%
4.	(United States) Los Angeles International Airport	Los Angeles, California	United States	LAX/KLAX	80,921,527	3	8.0%
5.	(Japan) Tokyo Haneda Airport	Ōta, Tokyo	Japan	HND/RJTT	79,699,762	0	5.8%
6.	(United States) O'Hare International Airport	Chicago, Illinois	United States	ORD/KORD	78,327,479	2	1.8%
7.	(United Kingdom) Heathrow Airport	Hillingdon, London	United Kingdom	LHR/EGLL	75,715,474	1	1.0%
8.	Hong Kong International Airport	Chek Lap Kok, Islands, New Territories	China	HKG/VHHH	70,314,462	0	3.0%
9.	(China) Shanghai Pudong International Airport	Pudong, Shanghai	China	PVG/ZSPD	66,002,414	4	9.9%
10.	(France) Charles de Gaulle Airport	Roissy-en-France, Île-de-France	France	CDG/LFPG	65,933,145	1	0.3%
11.	(United States) Dallas/Fort Worth International Airport	Dallas-Fort Worth, Texas	United States	DFW/KDFW	65,670,697	1	0.2%
12.	(Netherlands) Amsterdam Airport Schiphol	Haarlemmermeer, North Holland	The Netherlands	AMS/EHAM	63,625,534	2	9.2%
13.	(Germany) Frankfurt Airport	Frankfurt, Hesse	Germany	FRA/EDDF	60,786,937	1	0.4%
14.	(Turkey) Istanbul Atatürk Airport	Yeşilköy, Istanbul	Turkey	IST/LTBA	60,248,741	3	1.7%
15.	(China) Guangzhou Baiyun International Airport	Baiyun-Huadu, Guangzhou, Guangdong	China	CAN/ZGGG	59,732,147	2	8.2%
16.	(United States) John F. Kennedy International Airport	Queens, New York City, New York	United States	JFK/KJFK	58,813,103	1	3.4%
17.	Singapore Changi Airport	Changi, East Region	Singapore	SIN/WSSS	58,698,000	1	5.9%
18.	(United States) Denver International Airport	Denver, Colorado	United States	DEN/KDEN	58,266,515	1	7.9%
19.	(South Korea) Seoul Incheon International Airport	Incheon	Republic of Korea	ICN/RKSI	57,849,814	3	17.1%
20.	(Thailand) Suvarnabhumi Airport	Bang Phli, Samut Prakan	Thailand	BKK/VTBS	55,892,428	0	5.7%
21.	(India) Indira Gandhi International Airport	Delhi	India	DEL/VIDP	55,631,385	4	21.0%
22.	(Indonesia) Soekarno–Hatta International Airport	Benda, Tangerang, Banten	Indonesia	CGK/WIII	54,969,536	4	1.7%
23.	(United States) San Francisco International Airport	San Mateo County, California	United States	SFO/KSFO	53,099,282	2	6.1%
24.	(Malaysia) Kuala Lumpur International Airport	Sepang, Selangor	Malaysia	KUL/WMKK	52,640,043	1	7.6%
25.	(Spain) Madrid Barajas Airport	Barajas, Madrid	Spain	MAD/LEMD	50,397,928	1	7.7%
26.	(United States) McCarran International Airport	Las Vegas, Nevada	United States	LAS/KLAS	47,496,614	0	4.5%
27.	(China) Chengdu Shuangliu International Airport	Shuangliu-Wuhou, Chengdu, Sichuan	China	CTU/ZUUU	46,039,137	5	9.0%
28.	(United States) Seattle–Tacoma International Airport	SeaTac, Washington	United States	SEA/KSEA	45,736,700	3	8.0%
29.	(India) Chhatrapati Shivaji Maharaj International Airport	Mumbai, Maharashtra	India	BOM/VABB	44,680,555	6	10.0%
30.	(United States) Miami International Airport	Miami-Dade County, Florida	United States	MIA/KMIA	44,584,603	2	0.5%
31.	(United States) Charlotte Douglas International Airport	Charlotte, North Carolina	United States	CLT/KCLT	44,422,022	4	1.0%
32.	(Canada) Toronto Pearson International Airport	Mississauga, Ontario	Canada	YYZ/CYYZ	44,335,198	1	8.0%
33.	(Spain) Barcelona–El Prat Airport	El Prat, Catalonia	Spain	BCN/LEBL	44,131,031	7	11.2%
34.	(United States) Phoenix Sky Harbor International Airport	Phoenix, Arizona	United States	PHX/KPHX	43,302,381	5	1.7%
35.	(United Kingdom) Gatwick Airport	Crawley, West Sussex	United Kingdom	LGW/EGKK	43,136,795	2	7.1%
36.	Taiwan Taoyuan International Airport	Dayuan, Taoyuan	Taiwan	TPE/RCTP	42,296,322	8	9.9%
37.	(Germany) Munich Airport	Freising, Bavaria	Germany	MUC/EDDM	42,261,309	3	3.1%
38.	(Australia) Sydney Airport	Mascot, Sydney, New South Wales	Australia	SYD/YSSY	41,985,810	0	5.2%
39.	(China) Kunming Changshui International Airport	Guandu, Kunming, Yunnan	China	KMG/ZPPP	41,980,515	7	11.9%
40.	(China) Shenzhen Bao'an International Airport	Bao'an, Shenzhen, Guangdong	China	SZX/ZGSZ	41,975,090	1	5.7%
41.	(United States) Orlando International Airport	Orlando, Florida	United States	MCO/KMCO	41,923,399	2	8.0%
42.	(Italy) Rome–Fiumicino International Airport "Leonardo da Vinci"	Rome-Fiumicino, Lazio	Italy	FCO/LIRF	41,738,662	6	3.3%
43.	(United States) George Bush Intercontinental Airport	Houston, Texas	United States	IAH/KIAH	41,622,594	13	3.3%
44.	Mexico City International Airport	Venustiano Carranza, Mexico City	Mexico	MEX/MMMX	41,410,254	1	7.8%
45.	(China) Shanghai Hongqiao International Airport	Changning-Minhang, Shanghai	China	SHA/ZSSS	40,460,135	3	3.5%
46.	(United States) Newark Liberty International Airport	Newark, New Jersey	United States	EWR/KEWR	40,289,969	1	7.4%
47.	(Philippines) Ninoy Aquino International Airport	Pasay/Parañaque, Metro Manila	Philippines	MNL/RPLL	39,534,991	2	8.1%
48.	(Japan) Narita International Airport	Narita, Chiba	Japan	NRT/RJAA	39,000,563	0	4.7%
49.	(United States) Minneapolis/St Paul International Airport	St. Paul, Minnesota	United States	MSP/KMSP	37,413,728	1	2.3%
50.	(Qatar) Hamad International Airport	Doha	Qatar	DOH/OTHH	37,283,987	?	20.2%

== 2015 statistics ==
Airports Council International's full-year figures are as follows:

Rank	Airport	Location	Country	Code (IATA/ICAO)	Total passengers	Rank change	% change
1.	(United States) Hartsfield–Jackson Atlanta International Airport	Atlanta, Georgia	United States	ATL/KATL	101,491,106	0	5.5%
2.	(China) Beijing Capital International Airport	Chaoyang-Shunyi, Beijing	China	PEK/ZBAA	89,938,628	0	4.4%
3.	(United Arab Emirates) Dubai International Airport	Garhoud, Dubai	United Arab Emirates	DXB/OMDB	78,014,841	3	10.7%
4.	(United States) O'Hare International Airport	Chicago, Illinois	United States	ORD/KORD	76,942,493	3	9.8%
5.	(Japan) Tokyo Haneda Airport	Ōta, Tokyo	Japan	HND/RJTT	75,316,718	1	3.4%
6.	(United Kingdom) London Heathrow Airport	Hillingdon, London	United Kingdom	LHR/EGLL	74,989,795	3	2.2%
7.	(United States) Los Angeles International Airport	Los Angeles, California	United States	LAX/KLAX	74,937,004	2	6.1%
8.	Hong Kong International Airport	Chek Lap Kok, Islands, New Territories	Hong Kong (PRC)	HKG/VHHH	68,283,407	2	8.2%
9.	(France) Paris-Charles de Gaulle Airport	Roissy-en-France, Île-de-France	France	CDG/LFPG	65,766,986	1	3.1%
10.	(United States) Dallas/Fort Worth International Airport	Dallas–Fort Worth, Texas	United States	DFW/KDFW	65,512,163	1	0.9%
11.	(Turkey) Istanbul Atatürk Airport	Yeşilköy, Istanbul	Turkey	IST/LTBA	61,346,229	2	8.2%
12.	(Germany) Frankfurt Airport	Frankfurt, Hesse	Germany	FRA/EDDF	61,032,022	1	2.5%
13.	(China) Shanghai Pudong International Airport	Pudong, Shanghai	China	PVG/ZSPD	60,053,387	6	16.3%
14.	(Netherlands) Amsterdam Airport Schiphol	Haarlemmermeer, North Holland	The Netherlands	AMS/EHAM	58,284,864	0	6.0%
15.	(United States) John F. Kennedy International Airport	Queens, New York	United States	JFK/KJFK	56,827,154	3	6.8%
16.	Singapore Changi Airport	Changi, East Region	Singapore	SIN/WSSS	55,449,000	0	2.5%
17.	(China) Guangzhou Baiyun International Airport	Baiyun-Huadu, Guangzhou, Guangdong	China	CAN/ZGGG	55,201,915	2	0.8%
18.	(Indonesia) Soekarno-Hatta International Airport	Tangerang, Banten	Indonesia	CGK/WIII	54,053,905	6	5.5%
19.	(United States) Denver International Airport	Denver, Colorado	United States	DEN/KDEN	54,014,502	2	1.0%
20.	(Thailand) Suvarnabhumi Airport	Bang Phli, Samut Prakan	Thailand	BKK/VTBS	52,808,013	2	13.8%
21.	(United States) San Francisco International Airport	San Mateo County, California	United States	SFO/KSFO	50,057,887	0	6.3%
22.	(South Korea) Seoul Incheon International Airport	Incheon	Republic of Korea	ICN/RKSI	49,412,750	1	8.2%
23.	(Malaysia) Kuala Lumpur International Airport	Sepang, Selangor	Malaysia	KUL/WMKK	48,938,424	3	0.0%
24.	(Spain) Madrid Barajas Airport	Barajas, Madrid	Spain	MAD/LEMD	46,779,554	3	12.0%
25.	(India) Indira Gandhi International Airport	Delhi	India	DEL/VIDP	45,981,773	6	15.7%
26.	(United States) McCarran International Airport	Las Vegas, Nevada	United States	LAS/KLAS	45,356,580	1	5.8%
27.	(United States) Charlotte Douglas International Airport	Charlotte, North Carolina	United States	CLT/KCLT	44,876,627	3	1.2%
28.	(United States) Miami International Airport	Miami-Dade County, Florida	United States	MIA/KMIA	44,350,247	1	8.3%
29.	(United States) Phoenix Sky Harbor International Airport	Phoenix, Arizona	United States	PHX/KPHX	44,003,840	3	4.5%
30.	(United States) George Bush Intercontinental Airport	Houston, Texas	United States	IAH/KIAH	43,023,224	2	4.3%
31.	(United States) Seattle-Tacoma International Airport	SeaTac, Washington	United States	SEA/KSEA	42,340,461	9	12.9%
32.	(China) Chengdu Shuangliu International Airport	Shuangliu-Wuhou, Chengdu, Sichuan	China	CTU/ZUUU	42,244,842	6	12.0%
33.	(Canada) Toronto Pearson International Airport	Mississauga, Ontario	Canada	YYZ/CYYZ	41,036,847	1	6.4%
34.	(Germany) Munich Airport	Freising, Bavaria	Germany	MUC/EDDM	40,981,522	2	3.2%
35.	(India) Chhatrapati Shivaji Maharaj International Airport	Mumbai, Maharashtra	India	BOM/VABB	40,637,377	12	16.1%
36.	(Italy) Rome–Fiumicino International Airport "Leonardo da Vinci"	Rome-Fiumicino, Lazio	Italy	FCO/LIRF	40,422,156	1	5.0%
37.	(United Kingdom) London Gatwick Airport	Crawley, West Sussex	United Kingdom	LGW/EGKK	40,271,343	1	5.7%
38.	(Australia) Sydney Airport	Mascot, Sydney, New South Wales	Australia	SYD/YSSY	39,914,103	5	2.7%
39.	(China) Shenzhen Bao'an International Airport	Bao'an, Shenzhen, Guangdong	China	SZX/ZGSZ	39,721,619	2	9.5%
40.	(Spain) Barcelona–El Prat Airport	Barcelona	Spain	BCN/LEBL	39,674,095	1	5.7%
41.	(Brazil) São Paulo-Guarulhos International Airport	Guarulhos, São Paulo	Brazil	GRU/SBGR	39,213,865	11	1.4%
42.	(China) Shanghai Hongqiao International Airport	Changning-Minhang, Shanghai	China	SHA/ZSSS	39,090,699	5	3.0%
43.	(United States) Orlando International Airport	Orlando, Florida	United States	MCO/KMCO	38,727,749	0	8.4%
44.	Taiwan Taoyuan International Airport	Dayuan, Taoyuan	Taiwan	TPE/RCTP	38,473,333	2	7.5%
45.	Mexico City International Airport	Venustiano Carranza, Mexico City	Mexico	MEX/MMMX	38,433,288	3	12.2%
46.	(China) Kunming Changshui International Airport	Guandu, Kunming, Yunnan	China	KMG/ZPPP	37,523,345	?	16.0%
47.	(United States) Newark Liberty International Airport	Newark, New Jersey	United States	EWR/KEWR	37,494,704	3	5.3%
48.	(Japan) Narita International Airport	Narita, Chiba	Japan	NRT/RJAA	37,268,307	3	4.9%
49.	(Philippines) Ninoy Aquino International Airport	Pasay/Parañaque, Metro Manila	Philippines	MNL/RPLL	36,583,459	0	7.3%
50.	(United States) Minneapolis/St Paul International Airport	St. Paul, Minnesota	United States	MSP/KMSP	36,556,281	4	4.1%

== 2014 statistics ==
Airports Council International's full-year figures are as follows:

Rank	Airport	Location	Country	Code (IATA/ICAO)	Total passengers	Rank change	% change
1.	(United States) Hartsfield–Jackson Atlanta International Airport	Atlanta, Georgia	United States	ATL/KATL	96,178,899	0	1.9%
2.	(China) Beijing Capital International Airport	Chaoyang-Shunyi, Beijing	China	PEK/ZBAA	86,128,270	0	2.9%
3.	(United Kingdom) London Heathrow Airport	Hillingdon, London	United Kingdom	LHR/EGLL	73,408,489	0	1.4%
4.	(Japan) Tokyo Haneda Airport	Ōta, Tokyo	Japan	HND/RJTT	72,826,565	0	5.7%
5.	(United States) Los Angeles International Airport	Los Angeles, California	United States	LAX/KLAX	70,663,265	1	6.0%
6.	(United Arab Emirates) Dubai International Airport	Garhoud, Dubai	United Arab Emirates	DXB/OMDB	70,475,636	1	6.1%
7.	(United States) O'Hare International Airport	Chicago, Illinois	United States	ORD/KORD	69,999,010	2	4.6%
8.	(France) Paris-Charles de Gaulle Airport	Roissy-en-France, Île-de-France	France	CDG/LFPG	63,813,756	0	2.8%
9.	(United States) Dallas/Fort Worth International Airport	Dallas–Fort Worth, Texas	United States	DFW/KDFW	63,554,402	0	5.1%
10.	Hong Kong International Airport	Chek Lap Kok, Islands, New Territories	Hong Kong (PRC)	HKG/VHHH	63,121,786	1	5.9%
11.	(Germany) Frankfurt Airport	Frankfurt, Hesse	Germany	FRA/EDDF	59,566,132	1	2.6%
12.	(Indonesia) Soekarno-Hatta International Airport	Cengkareng, Banten	Indonesia	CGK/WIII	57,221,169	2	3.6%
13.	(Turkey) Istanbul Atatürk Airport	Istanbul	Turkey	IST/LTBA	56,767,108	5	10.7%
14.	(Netherlands) Amsterdam Airport Schiphol	Haarlemmermeer, North Holland	The Netherlands	AMS/EHAM	54,978,023	0	4.6%
15.	(China) Guangzhou Baiyun International Airport	Baiyun-Huadu, Guangzhou, Guangdong	China	CAN/ZGGG	54,780,346	1	4.4%
16.	Singapore Changi Airport	Changi, East Region	Singapore	SIN/WSSS	54,093,000	3	0.7%
17.	(United States) Denver International Airport	Denver, Colorado	United States	DEN/KDEN	53,472,514	2	1.7%
18.	(United States) John F. Kennedy International Airport	Queens, New York, New York	United States	JFK/KJFK	53,254,533	1	5.6%
19.	(China) Shanghai Pudong International Airport	Pudong, Shanghai	China	PVG/ZSPD	51,687,894	2	9.5%
20.	(Malaysia) Kuala Lumpur International Airport	Sepang, Selangor	Malaysia	KUL/WMKK	48,930,409	0	3.0%
21.	(United States) San Francisco International Airport	San Mateo County, California	United States	SFO/KSFO	47,114,631	1	4.8%
22.	(Thailand) Suvarnabhumi Airport	Bang Phli, Samut Prakan	Thailand	BKK/VTBS	46,423,352	5	9.6%
23.	(South Korea) Seoul Incheon International Airport	Incheon	Republic of Korea	ICN/RKSI	45,662,322	2	9.6%
24.	(United States) Charlotte Douglas International Airport	Charlotte, North Carolina	United States	CLT/KCLT	44,279,504	1	1.9%
25.	(United States) McCarran International Airport	Las Vegas, Nevada	United States	LAS/KLAS	42,869,517	1	2.4%
26.	(United States) Phoenix Sky Harbor International Airport	Phoenix, Arizona	United States	PHX/KPHX	42,125,212	1	4.5%
27.	(Spain) Madrid Barajas Airport	Barajas, Madrid	Spain	MAD/LEMD	41,822,863	2	5.3%
28.	(United States) George Bush Intercontinental Airport	Houston, Texas	United States	IAH/KIAH	41,239,700	0	3.6%
29.	(United States) Miami International Airport	Miami-Dade County, Florida	United States	MIA/KMIA	40,941,879	3	0.9%
30.	(Brazil) São Paulo-Guarulhos International Airport	Guarulhos, São Paulo	Brazil	GRU/SBGR	39,765,714	3	9.9%
31.	(India) Indira Gandhi International Airport	Delhi	India	DEL/VIDP	39,752,819	1	8.4%
32.	(Germany) Munich Airport	Freising, Bavaria	Germany	MUC/EDDM	39,700,515	2	2.7%
33.	(Australia) Sydney Airport	Mascot, Sydney, New South Wales	Australia	SYD/YSSY	38,863,380	2	1.6%
34.	(Canada) Toronto Pearson International Airport	Mississauga, Ontario	Canada	YYZ/CYYZ	38,569,088	1	6.8%
35.	(Italy) Rome–Fiumicino International Airport "Leonardo da Vinci"	Rome-Fiumicino, Lazio	Italy	FCO/LIRF	38,506,467	1	6.5%
36.	(United Kingdom) London Gatwick Airport	Crawley, West Sussex	United Kingdom	LGW/EGKK	38,105,747	1	7.5%
37.	(China) Shanghai Hongqiao International Airport	Changning-Minhang, Shanghai	China	SHA/ZSSS	37,971,135	1	6.7%
38.	(China) Chengdu Shuangliu International Airport	Shuangliu-Wuhou, Chengdu, Sichuan	China	CTU/ZUUU	37,712,357	6	12.8%
39.	(Spain) Barcelona–El Prat Airport	Barcelona	Spain	BCN/LEBL	37,540,326	0	6.7%
40.	(United States) Seattle-Tacoma International Airport	SeaTac, Washington	United States	SEA/KSEA	37,497,941	2	7.7
41.	(China) Shenzhen Bao'an International Airport	Bao'an, Shenzhen, Guangdong	China	SZX/ZGSZ	36,272,701	6	12.4%
42.	Taiwan Taoyuan International Airport	Dayuan, Taoyuan	Taiwan	TPE/RCTP	35,804,465	1	11.2%
43.	(United States) Orlando International Airport	Orlando, Florida	United States	MCO/KMCO	35,714,091	2	2.7%
44.	(United States) Newark Liberty International Airport	Newark, New Jersey	United States	EWR/KEWR	35,610,759	4	1.7%
45.	(Japan) Narita International Airport	Narita, Chiba	Japan	NRT/RJAA	35,535,206	7	0.6%
46.	(United States) Minneapolis/St Paul International Airport	St. Paul, Minnesota	United States	MSP/KMSP	35,147,083	3	3.7%
47.	(India) Chhatrapati Shivaji Maharaj International Airport	Mumbai, Maharashtra	India	BOM/VABB	34,993,738	1	9.6%
48.	Mexico City International Airport	Venustiano Carranza, Mexico City	Mexico	MEX/MMMX	34,255,739	1	8.6%
49.	(Philippines) Ninoy Aquino International Airport	Pasay/Parañaque, Metro Manila	Philippines	MNL/RPLL	34,015,169	4	3.5%
50.	(Russia) Domodedovo International Airport	Domodedovo, Moscow Oblast	Russia	DME/UUDD	33,108,047	0	7.3%

== 2013 statistics ==
Airports Council International's full-year figures are as follows:

Rank	Airport	Location	Country	Code (IATA/ICAO)	Total passengers	Rank Change	% change
1.	(United States) Hartsfield–Jackson Atlanta International Airport	Atlanta, Georgia	United States	ATL/KATL	94,430,785	0	1.1%
2.	(China) Beijing Capital International Airport	Chaoyang-Shunyi, Beijing	China	PEK/ZBAA	83,712,355	0	2.2%
3.	(United Kingdom) London Heathrow Airport	Hillingdon, London	United Kingdom	LHR/EGLL	72,368,030	0	3.3%
4.	(Japan) Tokyo Haneda Airport	Ōta, Tokyo	Japan	HND/RJTT	68,906,636	0	3.3%
5.	(United States) O'Hare International Airport	Chicago, Illinois	United States	ORD/KORD	66,883,271	0	0.1%
6.	(United States) Los Angeles International Airport	Los Angeles, California	United States	LAX/KLAX	66,702,252	0	4.7%
7.	(United Arab Emirates) Dubai International Airport	Garhoud, Dubai	United Arab Emirates	DXB/OMDB	66,431,533	3	15.2%
8.	(France) Paris-Charles de Gaulle Airport	Roissy-en-France, Île-de-France	France	CDG/LFPG	62,052,917	1	0.7%
9.	(United States) Dallas/Fort Worth International Airport	Dallas–Fort Worth, Texas	United States	DFW/KDFW	60,436,266	1	3.2%
10.	(Indonesia) Soekarno-Hatta International Airport	Cengkareng, Tangerang, Banten	Indonesia	CGK/WIII	59,701,543	1	3.4%
11.	Hong Kong International Airport	Chek Lap Kok, Islands, New Territories	Hong Kong (PRC)	HKG/VHHH	59,609,414	1	6.3%
12.	(Germany) Frankfurt Airport	Frankfurt, Hesse	Germany	FRA/EDDF	58,036,948	1	0.9%
13.	Singapore Changi Airport	Changi, East Region	Singapore	SIN/WSSS	53,726,087	2	5.0%
14.	(Netherlands) Amsterdam Schiphol Airport	Haarlemmermeer, North Holland	Netherlands	AMS/EHAM	52,569,250	2	3.0%
15.	(United States) Denver International Airport	Denver, Colorado	United States	DEN/KDEN	52,556,359	2	1.1%
16.	(China) Guangzhou Baiyun International Airport	Baiyun-Huadu, Guangzhou, Guangdong	China	CAN/ZGGG	52,450,262	2	8.6%
17.	(Thailand) Suvarnabhumi Airport	Bang Phli, Samut Prakan	Thailand	BKK/VTBS	51,363,451	3	3.1%
18.	(Turkey) Atatürk International Airport	Istanbul	Turkey	IST/LTBA	51,172,626	2	13.6%
19.	(United States) John F. Kennedy International Airport	Queens, New York, New York	United States	JFK/KJFK	50,413,204	2	2.3%
20.	(Malaysia) Kuala Lumpur International Airport	Sepang, Selangor	Malaysia	KUL/WMKK	47,498,157	7	19.1%
21.	(China) Shanghai Pudong International Airport	Pudong, Shanghai	China	PVG/ZSPD	47,189,849	0	5.2%
22.	(United States) San Francisco International Airport	San Mateo County, California	United States	SFO/KSFO	44,944,201	0	1.2%
23.	(United States) Charlotte Douglas International Airport	Charlotte, North Carolina	United States	CLT/KCLT	43,456,310	1	5.4%
24.	(United States) McCarran International Airport	Las Vegas, Nevada	United States	LAS/KLAS	41,856,787	1	0.5%
25.	(South Korea) Seoul Incheon International Airport	Incheon	Republic of Korea	ICN/RKSI	41,679,758	4	6.5%
26.	(United States) Miami International Airport	Miami-Dade County, Florida	United States	MIA/KMIA	40,563,071	2	2.8%
27.	(United States) Phoenix Sky Harbor International Airport	Phoenix, Arizona	United States	PHX/KPHX	40,318,451	2	0.3%
28.	(United States) George Bush Intercontinental Airport	Houston, Texas	United States	IAH/KIAH	39,865,325	2	0.1%
29.	(Spain) Madrid Barajas Airport	Barajas, Madrid	Spain	MAD/LEMD	39,729,027	10	12.1%
30.	(Germany) Munich Airport	Freising, Bavaria	Germany	MUC/EDDM	38,672,644	0	0.8%
31.	(Australia) Sydney Airport	Sydney, New South Wales	Australia	SYD/YSSY	38,254,039	0	2.4%
32.	(India) Indira Gandhi International Airport	Delhi	India	DEL/VIDP	36,712,455	5	7.3%
33.	(Brazil) São Paulo-Guarulhos International Airport	Guarulhos, São Paulo	Brazil	GRU/SBGR	36,460,923	10	10.6%
34.	(Italy) Rome–Fiumicino International Airport "Leonardo da Vinci"	Rome-Fiumicino, Lazio	Italy	FCO/LIRF	36,165,762	5	2.2%
35.	(Canada) Toronto Pearson International Airport	Mississauga, Ontario	Canada	YYZ/CYYZ	36,037,962	0	3.2%
36.	(China) Shanghai Hongqiao International Airport	Changning-Minhang, Shanghai	China	SHA/ZSSS	35,599,643	3	5.3%
37.	(United Kingdom) London Gatwick Airport	Crawley, West Sussex	United Kingdom	LGW/EGKK	35,448,590	1	3.6%
38.	(Japan) Narita International Airport	Narita, Chiba	Japan	NRT/RJAA	35,341,341	4	7.6%
39.	(Spain) Barcelona–El Prat Airport	Barcelona	Spain	BCN/LEBL	35,210,735	5	0.2%
40.	(United States) Newark Liberty International Airport	Newark, New Jersey	United States	EWR/KEWR	35,016,236	2	3.0%
41.	(United States) Orlando International Airport	Orlando, Florida	United States	MCO/KMCO	34,973,645	8	0.8%
42.	(United States) Seattle-Tacoma International Airport	SeaTac, Washington	United States	SEA/KSEA	34,824,281	2	4.8%
43.	(United States) Minneapolis/St Paul International Airport	St. Paul, Minnesota	United States	MSP/KMSP	33,870,693	2	2.3%
44.	(China) Chengdu Shuangliu International Airport	Shuangliu-Wuhou, Chengdu, Sichuan	China	CTU/ZUUU	33,445,817	2	5.8%
45.	(Philippines) Ninoy Aquino International Airport	Pasay/Parañaque, Metro Manila	Philippines	MNL/RPLL	32,856,597	0	3.1%
46.	(United States) Detroit Metropolitan Wayne County Airport	Detroit, Michigan	United States	DTW/KDTW	32,389,544	2	0.6%
47.	(China) Shenzhen Bao'an International Airport	Bao'an, Shenzhen, Guangdong	China	SZX/ZGSZ	32,268,457	2	9.1%
48.	(India) Chhatrapati Shivaji Maharaj International Airport	Mumbai, Maharashtra	India	BOM/VABB	31,940,026	0	6.3%
49.	Mexico City International Airport	Venustiano Carranza, Mexico City	Mexico	MEX/MMMX	31,534,638	1	6.9%
50.	(Russia) Domodedovo International Airport	Domodedovo, Moscow Oblast	Russia	DME/UUDD	30,765,078	1	9.2%

== 2012 statistics ==
Airports Council International's preliminary full-year figures are as follows:

Rank	Airport	Location	Country	Code (IATA/ICAO)	Total passengers	Rank change	% change
1.	(United States) Hartsfield–Jackson Atlanta International Airport	Atlanta, Georgia	United States	ATL/KATL	94,956,643	0	3.3%
2.	(China) Beijing Capital International Airport	Chaoyang-Shunyi, Beijing	China	PEK/ZBAA	81,929,359	0	4.5%
3.	(United Kingdom) Heathrow Airport	Hillingdon, London	United Kingdom	LHR/EGLL	70,037,417	0	0.9%
4.	(Japan) Tokyo Haneda Airport	Ōta, Tokyo	Japan	HND/RJTT	67,788,722	1	8.3%
5.	(United States) O'Hare International Airport	Chicago, Illinois	United States	ORD/KORD	66,834,931	1	0.4%
6.	(United States) Los Angeles International Airport	Los Angeles, California	United States	LAX/KLAX	63,688,121	0	3.0%
7.	(France) Paris-Charles de Gaulle Airport	Roissy-en-France, Île-de-France	France	CDG/LFPG	61,611,934	0	1.1%
8.	(United States) Dallas/Fort Worth International Airport	Dallas–Fort Worth, Texas	United States	DFW/KDFW	58,591,842	0	1.4%
9.	(Indonesia) Soekarno-Hatta International Airport	Cengkareng, Tangerang, Banten	Indonesia	CGK/WIII	57,730,732	3	14.4%
10.	(United Arab Emirates) Dubai International Airport	Garhoud, Dubai	United Arab Emirates	DXB/OMDB	57,684,550	3	13.2%
11.	(Germany) Frankfurt Airport	Frankfurt, Hesse	Germany	FRA/EDDF	57,520,001	2	1.9%
12.	Hong Kong International Airport	Chek Lap Kok, Islands, New Territories	Hong Kong (PRC)	HKG/VHHH	56,064,248	2	5.2%
13.	(United States) Denver International Airport	Denver, Colorado	United States	DEN/KDEN	53,156,278	2	0.6%
14.	(Thailand) Suvarnabhumi Airport	Bang Phli, Samut Prakan	Thailand	BKK/VTBS	53,002,328	2	10.6%
15.	Singapore Changi Airport	Changi, East Region	Singapore	SIN/WSSS	51,181,804	3	10.0%
16.	(Netherlands) Amsterdam Schiphol Airport	Haarlemmermeer, North Holland	Netherlands	AMS/EHAM	51,035,590	2	2.6%
17.	(United States) John F. Kennedy International Airport	Queens, New York, New York	United States	JFK/KJFK	49,293,587	0	3.1%
18.	(China) Guangzhou Baiyun International Airport	Baiyun-Huadu, Guangzhou, Guangdong	China	CAN/ZGGG	48,548,430	1	7.8%
19.	(Spain) Madrid Barajas Airport	Barajas, Madrid	Spain	MAD/LEMD	45,175,501	4	9.0%
20.	(Turkey) Atatürk International Airport	Istanbul	Turkey	IST/LTBA	44,992,420	10	20.1%
21.	(China) Shanghai Pudong International Airport	Pudong, Shanghai	China	PVG/ZSPD	44,880,164	1	8.3%
22.	(United States) San Francisco International Airport	San Mateo County, California	United States	SFO/KSFO	44,431,894	1	8.6%
23.	(United States) McCarran International Airport	Las Vegas, Nevada	United States	LAS/KLAS	41,666,527	0	0.5%
24.	(United States) Charlotte Douglas International Airport	Charlotte, North Carolina	United States	CLT/KCLT	41,226,035	1	5.6%
25.	(United States) Phoenix Sky Harbor International Airport	Phoenix, Arizona	United States	PHX/KPHX	40,452,009	3	0.3%
26.	(United States) George Bush Intercontinental Airport	Houston, Texas	United States	IAH/KIAH	40,022,736	2	0.5%
27.	(Malaysia) Kuala Lumpur International Airport	Sepang, Selangor	Malaysia	KUL/WMKK	39,887,866	1	6.6%
28.	(United States) Miami International Airport	Miami-Dade County, Florida	United States	MIA/KMIA	39,467,444	2	3.0%
29.	(South Korea) Seoul Incheon International Airport	Incheon	Republic of Korea	ICN/RKSI	39,154,375	4	11.3%
30.	(Germany) Munich Airport	Munich, Bavaria	Germany	MUC/EDDM	38,360,604	3	1.6%
31.	(Australia) Sydney Airport	Sydney, New South Wales	Australia	SYD/YSSY	37,342,798	0	3.7%
32.	(Italy) Rome–Fiumicino International Airport "Leonardo da Vinci"	Rome-Fiumicino, Lazio	Italy	FCO/LIRF	36,980,161	3	1.8%
33.	(United States) Orlando International Airport	Orlando, Florida	United States	MCO/KMCO	35,214,430	1	0.4%
34.	(Spain) Barcelona Airport	Barcelona, Catalonia	Spain	BCN/LEBL	35,131,771	1	2.2%
35.	(Canada) Toronto Pearson International Airport	Mississauga, Ontario	Canada	YYZ/CYYZ	34,912,456	3	4.4%
36.	(United Kingdom) London Gatwick Airport	Crawley, West Sussex	United Kingdom	LGW/EGKK	34,222,405	0	1.7%
37.	(India) Indira Gandhi International Airport	Delhi	India	DEL/VIDP	34,211,608	3	1.5%
38.	(United States) Newark Liberty International Airport	Newark, New Jersey	United States	EWR/KEWR	33,993,962	1	0.9%
39.	(China) Shanghai Hongqiao International Airport	Changning-Minhang, Shanghai	China	SHA/ZSSS	33,828,726	0	2.2%
40.	(United States) Seattle-Tacoma International Airport	SeaTac, Washington	United States	SEA/KSEA	33,219,723	1	1.2%
41.	(United States) Minneapolis-Saint Paul International Airport	Fort Snelling, Minnesota	United States	MSP/KMSP	33,125,768	1	0.2%
42.	(Japan) Narita International Airport	Narita, Chiba	Japan	NRT/RJAA	32,874,530	?	17.2%
43.	(Brazil) São Paulo-Guarulhos International Airport	Guarulhos, São Paulo	Brazil	GRU/SBGR	32,477,646	2	6.9%
44.	(United States) Detroit Metropolitan Wayne County Airport	Detroit, Michigan	United States	DTW/KDTW	32,205,358	2	0.7%
45.	(Philippines) Ninoy Aquino International Airport	Pasay/Parañaque, Metro Manila	Philippines	MNL/RPLL	31,878,935	1	7.9%
46.	(China) Chengdu Shuangliu International Airport	Shuangliu-Wuhou, Chengdu, Sichuan	China	CTU/ZUUU	31,599,353	1	8.7%
47.	(United States) Philadelphia International Airport	Philadelphia, Pennsylvania	United States	PHL/KPHI	30,228,596	4	2.0%
48.	(India) Chhatrapati Shivaji Maharaj International Airport	Mumbai, Maharashtra	India	BOM/VABB	30,038,696	4	1.3%
49.	(China) Shenzhen Bao'an International Airport	Bao'an, Shenzhen, Guangdong	China	SZX/ZGSZ	29,569,725	0	4.7%
50.	(Australia) Melbourne Airport	Melbourne, Victoria	Australia	MEL/YMML	29,431,084	0	4.9%

== 2011 statistics ==
Airports Council International's final full-year figures are as follows:

Rank	Airport	Location	Country	Code (IATA/ICAO)	Total passengers	Rank change	% change
1.	(United States) Hartsfield–Jackson Atlanta International Airport	Atlanta, Georgia	United States	ATL/KATL	92,389,023	0	3.5%
2.	(China) Beijing Capital International Airport	Chaoyang-Shunyi, Beijing	China	PEK/ZBAA	78,675,058	0	6.4%
3.	(United Kingdom) London Heathrow Airport	Hillingdon, London	United Kingdom	LHR/EGLL	69,433,565	1	5.4%
4.	(United States) O'Hare International Airport	Chicago, Illinois	United States	ORD/KORD	66,701,241	1	0.1%
5.	(Japan) Tokyo Haneda Airport	Ōta, Tokyo	Japan	HND/RJTT	62,584,826	0	2.5%
6.	(United States) Los Angeles International Airport	Los Angeles, California	United States	LAX/KLAX	61,862,052	0	4.7%
7.	(France) Paris-Charles de Gaulle Airport	Roissy-en-France, Île-de-France	France	CDG/LFPG	60,970,551	0	4.8%
8.	(United States) Dallas/Fort Worth International Airport	Dallas–Fort Worth, Texas	United States	DFW/KDFW	57,832,495	0	1.6%
9.	(Germany) Frankfurt Airport	Frankfurt, Hesse	Germany	FRA/EDDF	56,436,255	0	6.5%
10.	Hong Kong International Airport	Chek Lap Kok, Islands, New Territories	Hong Kong (PRC)	HKG/VHHH	53,328,613	1	5.9%
11.	(United States) Denver International Airport	Denver, Colorado	United States	DEN/KDEN	52,849,132	1	1.7%
12.	(Indonesia) Soekarno-Hatta International Airport	Cengkareng, Jakarta, Java	Indonesia	CGK/WIII	51,533,187	4	16.2%
13.	(United Arab Emirates) Dubai International Airport	Garhoud, Dubai	United Arab Emirates	DXB/OMDB	50,977,960	0	8.0%
14.	(Netherlands) Amsterdam Schiphol Airport	Haarlemmermeer, North Holland	Netherlands	AMS/EHAM	49,755,252	1	10.0%
15.	(Spain) Madrid Barajas Airport	Barajas, Madrid	Spain	MAD/LEMD	49,653,055	3	0.4%
16.	(Thailand) Suvarnabhumi Airport	Bang Phli, Samut Prakan	Thailand	BKK/VTBS	47,910,904	1	12.0%
17.	(United States) John F. Kennedy International Airport	Queens, New York, New York	United States	JFK/KJFK	47,644,060	3	2.4%
18.	Singapore Changi Airport	Changi, East Region	Singapore	SIN/WSSS	46,543,845	0	10.7%
19.	(China) Guangzhou Baiyun International Airport	Baiyun-Huadu, Guangzhou, Guangdong	China	CAN/ZGGG	45,040,340	0	9.9%
20.	(China) Shanghai Pudong International Airport	Pudong, Shanghai	China	PVG/ZSPD	41,447,730	0	2.1%
21.	(United States) San Francisco International Airport	San Mateo County, California	United States	SFO/KSFO	40,927,786	2	4.3%
22.	(United States) Phoenix Sky Harbor International Airport	Phoenix, Arizona	United States	PHX/KPHX	40,591,948	2	5.3%
23.	(United States) McCarran International Airport	Las Vegas, Nevada	United States	LAS/KLAS	40,560,285	1	2.0%
24.	(United States) George Bush Intercontinental Airport	Houston, Texas	United States	IAH/KIAH	40,128,953	3	0.9%
25.	(United States) Charlotte Douglas International Airport	Charlotte, North Carolina	United States	CLT/KCLT	39,043,708	0	2.1%
26.	(United States) Miami International Airport	Miami-Dade County, Florida	United States	MIA/KMIA	38,314,389	2	7.3%
27.	(Germany) Munich Airport	Munich, Bavaria	Germany	MUC/EDDM	37,763,701	3	8.8%
28.	(Malaysia) Kuala Lumpur International Airport	Sepang, Selangor	Malaysia	KUL/WMKK	37,704,510	3	10.6%
29.	(Italy) Rome–Fiumicino International Airport "Leonardo da Vinci"	Rome-Fiumicino, Lazio	Italy	FCO/LIRF	37,651,222	3	3.9%
30.	(Turkey) Atatürk International Airport	Istanbul	Turkey	IST/LTBA	37,406,025	7	16.3%
31.	(Australia) Sydney Airport	Sydney, New South Wales	Australia	SYD/YSSY	36,022,614	4	0.1%
32.	(United States) Orlando International Airport	Orlando, Florida	United States	MCO/KMCO	35,356,991	3	1.4%
33.	(South Korea) Seoul Incheon International Airport	Incheon	Republic of Korea	ICN/RKSI	35,191,825	0	4.5%
34.	(India) Indira Gandhi International Airport	Delhi	India	DEL/VIDP	34,729,467	10	17.8%
35.	(Spain) Barcelona Airport	Barcelona, Catalonia	Spain	BCN/LEBL	34,387,597	8	15.1%
36.	(United Kingdom) London Gatwick Airport	Crawley, West Sussex, England	United Kingdom	LGW/EGKK	33,668,048	4	6.8%
37.	(United States) Newark Liberty International Airport	Newark, New Jersey	United States	EWR/KEWR	33,577,154	3	1.3%
38.	(Canada) Toronto Pearson International Airport	Mississauga, Ontario	Canada	YYZ/CYYZ	33,434,199	0	4.5%
39.	(China) Shanghai Hongqiao International Airport	Changning-Minhang, Shanghai	China	SHA/ZSSS	33,112,442	2	5.5%
40.	(United States) Minneapolis-Saint Paul International Airport	Fort Snelling, Minnesota	United States	MSP/KMSP	33,074,443	5	1.0%
41.	(United States) Seattle-Tacoma International Airport	SeaTac, Washington	United States	SEA/KSEA	32,820,060	2	3.9%
42.	(United States) Detroit Metropolitan Wayne County Airport	Detroit, Michigan	United States	DTW/KDTW	32,419,181	6	0.1%
43.	(United States) Philadelphia International Airport	Philadelphia, Pennsylvania	United States	PHL/KPHI	30,839,130	1	0.2%
44.	(India) Chhatrapati Shivaji Maharaj International Airport	Mumbai, Maharashtra	India	BOM/VABB	30,439,122	1	7.6%
45.	(Brazil) São Paulo-Guarulhos International Airport	Guarulhos, São Paulo	Brazil	GRU/SBGR	30,371,131	2	9.7%
46.	(Philippines) Ninoy Aquino International Airport	Pasay/Parañaque, Metro Manila	Philippines	MNL/RPLL	29,551,394	3	8.1%
47.	(China) Chengdu Shuangliu International Airport	Shuangliu-Wuhou, Chengdu, Sichuan	China	CTU/ZUUU	29,073,990	4	11.2%
48.	(United States) Logan International Airport	Boston, Massachusetts	United States	BOS/KBOS	28,866,313	0	5.0%
49.	(China) Shenzhen Bao'an International Airport	Bao'an, Shenzhen, Guangdong	China	SZX/ZGSZ	28,245,745	1	5.4%
50.	(Australia) Melbourne Airport	Melbourne, Victoria	Australia	MEL/YMML	28,060,111	4	1.2%

== 2010 statistics ==
Airports Council International's final full-year figures are as follows:

Rank	Airport	Location	Country	Code (IATA/ICAO)	Total passengers	Rank change	% change
1.	(United States) Hartsfield–Jackson Atlanta International Airport	Atlanta, Georgia	United States	ATL/KATL	89,331,622	0	1.5%
2.	(China) Beijing Capital International Airport	Chaoyang-Shunyi, Beijing	China	PEK/ZBAA	73,948,113	1	13.1%
3.	(United States) O'Hare International Airport	Chicago, Illinois	United States	ORD/KORD	66,774,738	1	4.1%
4.	(United Kingdom) London Heathrow Airport	Hillingdon, Greater London, England	United Kingdom	LHR/EGLL	65,884,143	2	0.2%
5.	(Japan) Tokyo Haneda Airport	Ōta, Tokyo	Japan	HND/RJTT	64,211,074	0	3.7%
6.	(United States) Los Angeles International Airport	Los Angeles, California	United States	LAX/KLAX	59,070,127	1	4.5%
7.	(France) Paris-Charles de Gaulle Airport	Roissy-en-France, Val d'Oise, Île-de-France	France	CDG/LFPG	58,167,062	1	0.5%
8.	(United States) Dallas/Fort Worth International Airport	Dallas–Fort Worth, Texas	United States	DFW/KDFW	56,906,610	0	1.6%
9.	(Germany) Frankfurt Airport	Frankfurt, Hesse	Germany	FRA/EDDF	53,009,221	0	4.1%
10.	(United States) Denver International Airport	Denver, Colorado	United States	DEN/KDEN	52,209,377	0	4.1%
11.	Hong Kong International Airport	Chek Lap Kok, Islands, New Territories	Hong Kong (PRC)	HKG/VHHH	50,348,960	2	10.5%
12.	(Spain) Madrid-Barajas Airport	Barajas, Madrid	Spain	MAD/LEMD	49,844,596	1	3.0%
13.	(United Arab Emirates) Dubai International Airport	Garhoud, Dubai	United Arab Emirates	DXB/OMDB	47,180,628	2	15.4%
14.	(United States) John F. Kennedy International Airport	Queens, New York, New York	United States	JFK/KJFK	46,514,154	2	1.4%
15.	(Netherlands) Amsterdam Airport Schiphol	Haarlemmermeer, North Holland	Netherlands	AMS/EHAM	45,211,749	1	3.8%
16.	(Indonesia) Soekarno-Hatta International Airport	Cengkareng, Jakarta, Java	Indonesia	CGK/WIII	44,355,998	6	19.4%
17.	(Thailand) Suvarnabhumi Airport	Bang Phli, Samut Prakan	Thailand	BKK/VTBS	42,784,967	1	5.6%
18.	Singapore Changi Airport	Changi, East Region	Singapore	SIN/WSSS	42,038,777	3	13.0%
19.	(China) Guangzhou Baiyun International Airport	Baiyun-Huadu, Guangzhou, Guangdong	China	CAN/ZGGG	40,975,673	4	10.6%
20.	(China) Shanghai Pudong International Airport	Pudong, Shanghai	China	PVG/ZSPD	40,578,621	14	26.4%
21.	(United States) George Bush Intercontinental Airport	Houston, Texas	United States	IAH/KIAH	40,479,569	3	1.2%
22.	(United States) McCarran International Airport	Las Vegas, Nevada	United States	LAS/KLAS	39,757,359	5	1.8%
23.	(United States) San Francisco International Airport	San Mateo County, California	United States	SFO/KSFO	39,253,999	3	5.1%
24.	(United States) Phoenix Sky Harbor International Airport	Phoenix, Arizona	United States	PHX/KPHX	38,554,215	5	1.9%
25.	(United States) Charlotte Douglas International Airport	Charlotte, North Carolina	United States	CLT/KCLT	38,254,207	1	10.8%
26.	(Italy) Rome–Fiumicino International Airport "Leonardo da Vinci"	Rome-Fiumicino, Lazio	Italy	FCO/LIRF	36,227,778	0	7.4%
27.	(Australia) Sydney Airport	Sydney, New South Wales	Australia	SYD/YSSY	35,991,917	1	7.6%
28.	(United States) Miami International Airport	Miami-Dade County, Florida	United States	MIA/KMIA	35,698,025	3	5.4%
29.	(United States) Orlando International Airport	Orlando, Florida	United States	MCO/KMCO	34,877,899	2	3.5%
30.	(Germany) Munich Airport	Munich, Bavaria	Germany	MUC/EDDM	34,721,605	0	6.2%
31.	(Malaysia) Kuala Lumpur International Airport	Sepang, Selangor	Malaysia	KUL/WMKK	34,087,636	9	
32.	(Japan) Narita International Airport	Narita, Chiba	Japan	NRT/RJAA	33,815,906	1	
33.	(South Korea) Seoul Incheon International Airport	Incheon	Republic of Korea	ICN/RKSI	33,605,579	8	
34.	(United States) Newark Liberty International Airport	Newark, New Jersey	United States	EWR/KEWR	33,133,852	5	
35.	(United States) Minneapolis-Saint Paul International Airport	Fort Snelling, Minnesota	United States	MSP/KMSP	32,749,649	3	
36.	(United States) Detroit Metropolitan Wayne County Airport	Detroit, Michigan	United States	DTW/KDTW	32,377,064	1	
37.	(Turkey) Atatürk International Airport	Yesilköy, Istanbul	Turkey	IST/LTBA	32,165,817	2	
38.	(Canada) Toronto Pearson International Airport	Mississauga, Ontario	Canada	YYZ/CYYZ	31,937,895	0	
39.	(United States) Seattle-Tacoma International Airport	SeaTac, Washington	United States	SEA/KSEA	31,553,166	3	
40.	(United Kingdom) London Gatwick Airport	Crawley, West Sussex, England	United Kingdom	LGW/EGKK	31,378,644	9	
41.	(China) Shanghai Hongqiao International Airport	Changning-Minhang, Shanghai	China	SHA/ZSSS	31,298,812	6	
42.	(United States) Philadelphia International Airport	Philadelphia, Pennsylvania	United States	PHL/KPHI	30,775,271	5	
43.	(Spain) Barcelona Airport	Barcelona, Catalonia	Spain	BCN/LEBL	29,197,135	1	
44.	(India) Indira Gandhi International Airport	Delhi	India	DEL/VIDP	28,531,607	0	
45.	(India) Chhatrapati Shivaji Maharaj International Airport	Mumbai, Maharashtra	India	BOM/VABB	28,137,797	3	
46.	(Australia) Melbourne Airport	Melbourne, Victoria	Australia	MEL/YMML	27,731,252	1	
47.	(Brazil) São Paulo-Guarulhos International Airport	Guarulhos, São Paulo	Brazil	GRU/SBGR	27,432,346	?	
48.	(United States) Logan International Airport	Boston, Massachusetts	United States	BOS/KBOS	27,429,152	5	
49.	(Philippines) Ninoy Aquino International Airport	Pasay/Parañaque, Metro Manila	Philippines	MNL/RPLL	27,148,724	?	
50.	(China) Shenzhen Bao'an International Airport	Bao'an, Shenzhen, Guangdong	China	SZX/ZGSZ	26,713,610	1	

== See also ==
- List of the busiest airports
- List of busiest airports by aircraft movements
- Busiest airports by continent
