= Gulf Indian High School =

Gulf Indian High School, Dubai

Location
- Dubai; United Arab Emirates
- Coordinates: 25°14′12″N 55°20′58″E

Information
- Established: 1979
- Director: Dr. S Reshma
- Principal: 2024-present - Dr. S Reshma; 2016-2024- Mr Mohammad Ali; 2013-2016 - Mr Bala Reddy Ambal; 2008-2013 - Mr Alexander Coates Reid; 2005-2008 - Mr PK Joel; 1980-2005 - Mr Dilbag Singh
- Grades: KG to Grade 12
- Education system: Central Board of Secondary Education
- Schedule: Morning Shift - 07:00 till 12:45 Afternoon Shift - 01:00 till 18:00
- Houses: Ruby; Emerald; Sapphire; Topaz
- Colours: White and Navy Blue Beige and Navy Blue
- Slogan: The end result of education is character
- Annual tuition: KG1 - AED 5,389 to Grade 12 - AED 9,834
- Affiliation: Central Board of Secondary Education
- Website: gihsdubai.com

Gulf Indian High School or GIHS is a CBSE affiliated school located in the Al Garhoud Area of Dubai. It is a senior secondary school with students from 3-17 of age accommodating classes from KG to 12. Students in 12th prepare for their All India Senior School Certificate Examination (AISSCE) as it is their senior and final year. The school is affiliated to the CBSE, New Delhi. Dominated by discipline and well knit community, assessed by the KHDA it has been coming out with an 'Acceptable' consistently throughout the years and has achieved the KHDA 'Good' Rating in the academic year 2023-24.

John M. Thomas, the school's founder and chairman, died in July 2022.

The school is now owned and managed by Regent Middle East

== KHDA Inspection Report ==
The Knowledge and Human Development Authority (KHDA) is an educational quality assurance authority based in Dubai, United Arab Emirates. It undertakes early learning, school and higher learning institution management and rates them as well

A summary of the inspection ratings for Gulf Indian High School.

School name	2017-2018	2018-2019	2019-2020	2022-2023	2023-2024
Gulf Indian High School	acceptable	acceptable	acceptable	acceptable	good

A summary of all the schools in Dubai's ratings can be found at KHDA School Ratings.
