= African Airways Alliance =

Somali-owned airline holding company

African Airways Alliance is a Somali-owned airline holding company headquartered in Mogadishu.

== Overview ==
African Airways Alliance was established on 19 February 2015, when Daallo Airlines merged with Jubba Airways. The new firm is equally owned by both airlines' founders. At this time, both airlines together offered 13 destinations including Dubai, Jeddah and Nairobi with plans to greatly expand their networks and fleet in the upcoming years. As of 2021, both airlines continue to operate under their separate brands.
