= Juillan =

- Commune
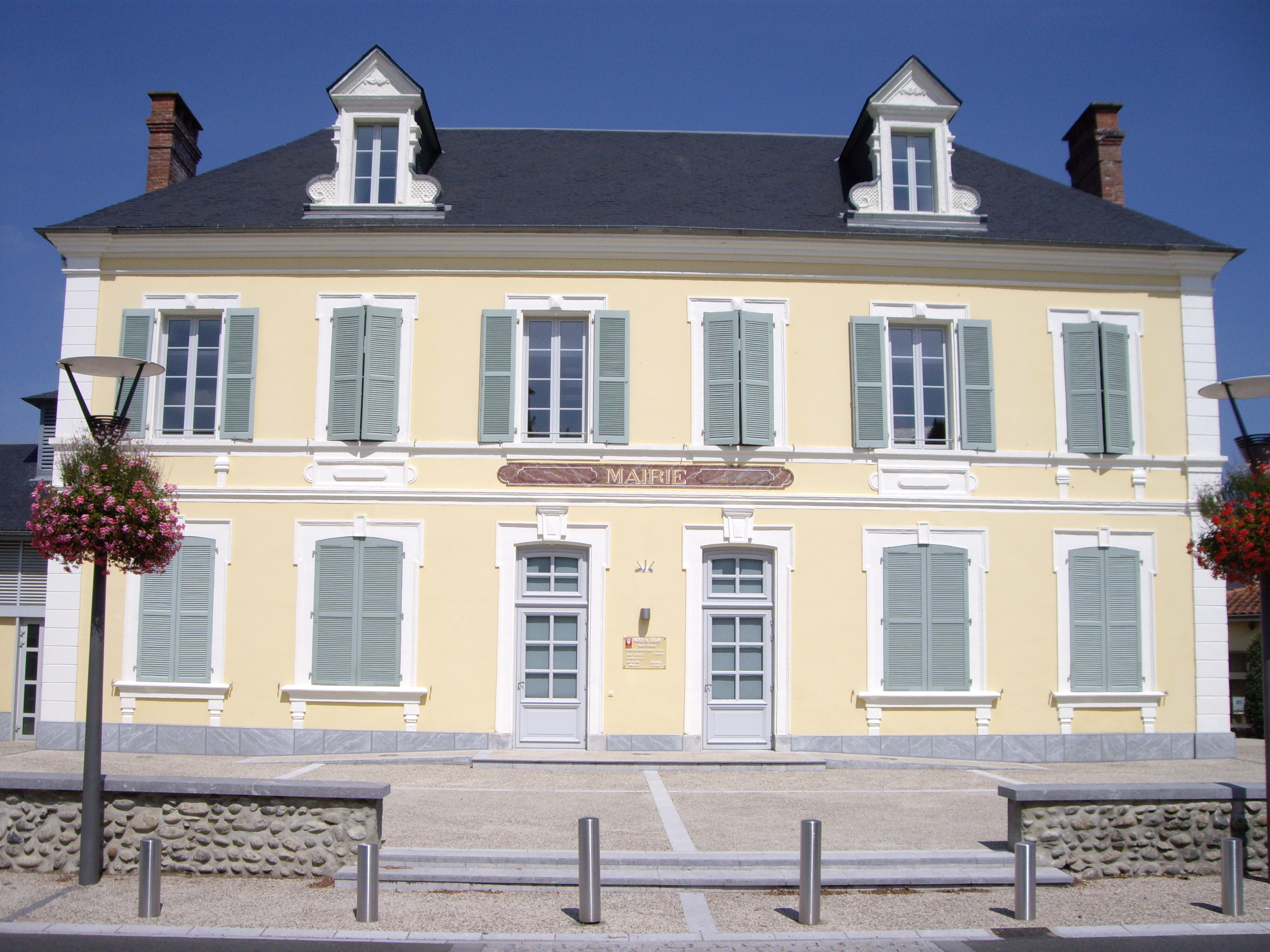
- The town hall

- Coat of arms
- Location of Juillan
- Location within France Location within Occitanie
- Coordinates: 43°12′08″N 0°01′27″E
- Country: France
- Region: Occitania
- Department: Hautes-Pyrénées
- Arrondissement: Tarbes
- Canton: Ossun
- Intercommunality: CA Tarbes-Lourdes-Pyrénées

Government
  - Mayor (2020–2026): Fabrice Sayous
- Area^{1}: 8.2 km^{2} (3.2 sq mi)
- Elevation: 342 m (1,122 ft)
- Highest elevation: 437 m (1,434 ft)
- Lowest elevation: 309 m (1,014 ft)
- Population (2023): 3,999
  - Density: 490/km^{2} (1,300/sq mi)
- Time zone: UTC+01:00 (CET)
  - Summer (DST): UTC+02:00 (CEST)
- INSEE/Postal code: 65235 /65290
- ^{1} French Land Register data, which excludes lakes, ponds, glaciers > 1 km^{2} (0.386 sq mi or 247 acres) and river estuaries.

Juillan (French pronunciation: [ʒɥijɑ̃]; Occitan: Julhan) is a commune in the Hautes-Pyrénées department in south-western France.

Air Méditerranée has its head office on the property of Tarbes–Lourdes–Pyrénées Airport, in Juillan.

== Population ==
Historical population
Year	Pop.	±% p.a.
1968	2,115	—
1975	2,420	+1.94%
1982	3,175	+3.96%
1990	3,483	+1.16%
1999	3,506	+0.07%
2007	3,805	+1.03%
2012	4,048	+1.25%
2017	4,106	+0.28%
2023	3,999	−0.44%
Source: INSEE

== Notable people ==
- Denis Jourdanet (1815–1892), physician and physiologist

== See also ==
- Communes of the Hautes-Pyrénées department
