= Hermes Airlines =

Greek charter airline

IATA	ICAO	Call sign
H3	HRM	HERMES
- Founded: 2011
- Ceased operations: 15 February 2016
- AOC #: GR-038
- Fleet size: 4
- Parent company: Air Méditerranée
- Headquarters: Alimos, Greece
- Website: hermesairlines.eu

Hermes Airlines was a Greek charter airline headquartered in Alimos. It operated charter flights around Europe and the Mediterranean using its own brand name as well as on behalf of other airlines.

== History ==
The airline was originally established as a subsidiary of Air Méditerranée. In February 2016 Air Méditerranée went into liquidation and closed, although Hermes Airlines confirmed they were unaffected by the decision and would continue operations; however, the airline would itself shut down as well during the same month.

== Fleet ==
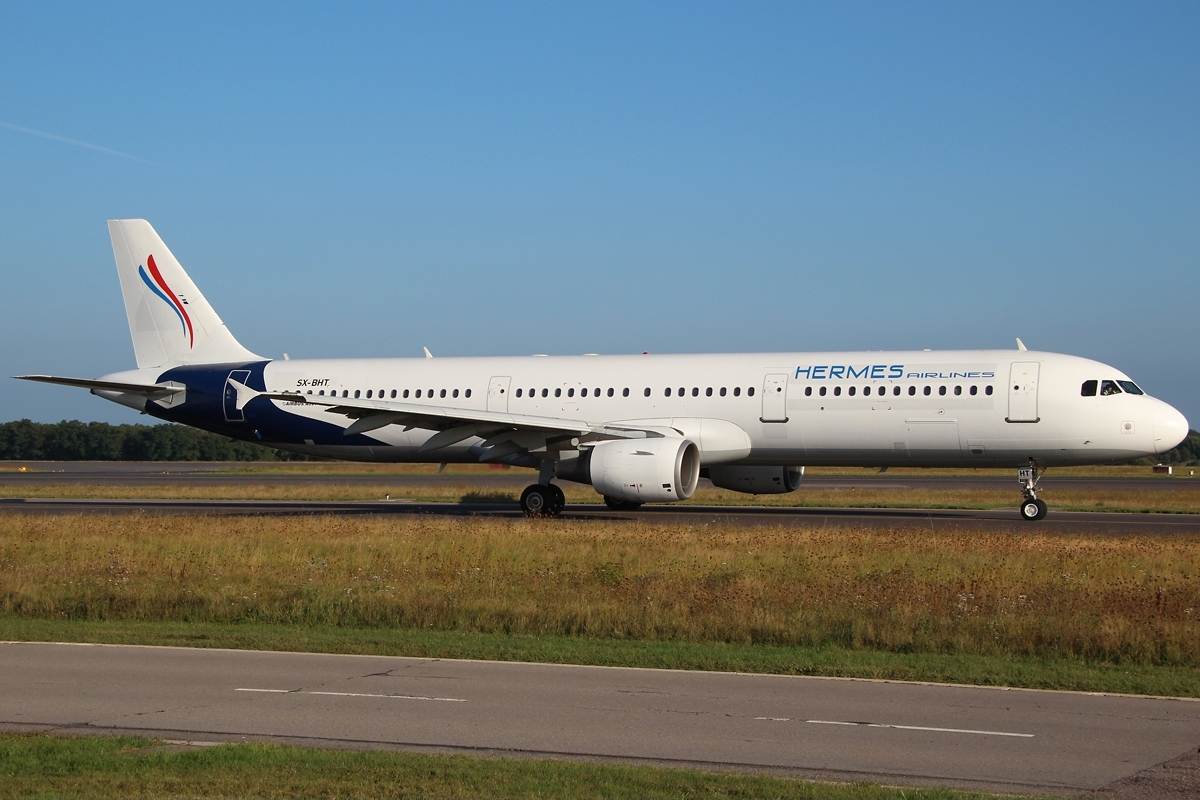
Hermes Airlines Airbus A321-200

As of February 2016, the Hermes Airlines fleet consisted of the following aircraft:

Hermes Airlines fleet
Aircraft	In service	Orders	Passengers	Notes
Airbus A320-200	2	—	180	1 operated for Daallo Airlines
Airbus A321-100	1	—	220	1 operated for Daallo Airlines (it was damaged when flying Daallo Airlines Flight 159)
Airbus A321-200	1	—	220	1 operated for Air Moldova
Boeing 737-300	1	—	unknown	
Boeing 737-500	1	—	unknown	
Total	6	—		
