= Air Méditerranée =

French airline (1997–2016)

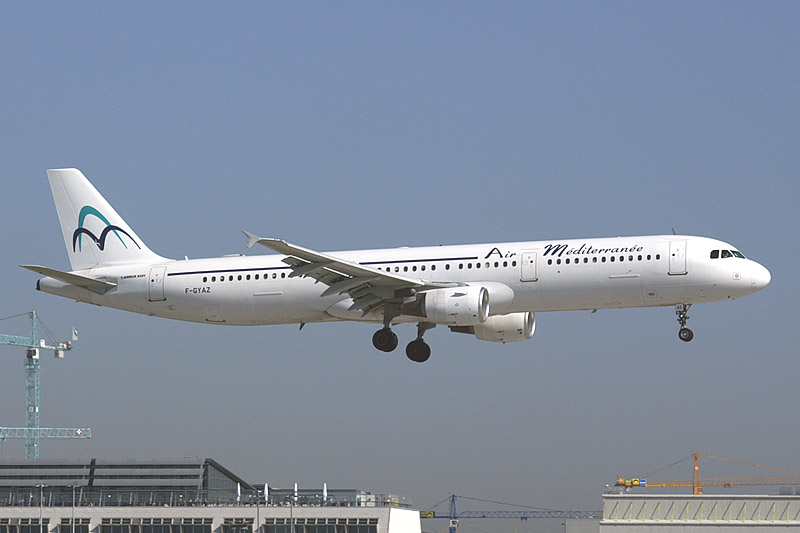
- Airbus A321-200
IATA	ICAO	Call sign
ML	BIE	MEDITERRANEE
- Founded: February 1997
- Ceased operations: 15 February 2016
- Hubs: Charles de Gaulle Airport
- Focus cities: Lyon-Saint Exupéry Airport; Nantes Atlantique Airport
- Subsidiaries: Hermes Airlines
- Fleet size: 6
- Destinations: 50+
- Headquarters: Juillan, France
- Key people: Antoine Ferretti, CEO
- Website: air-mediterranee.fr

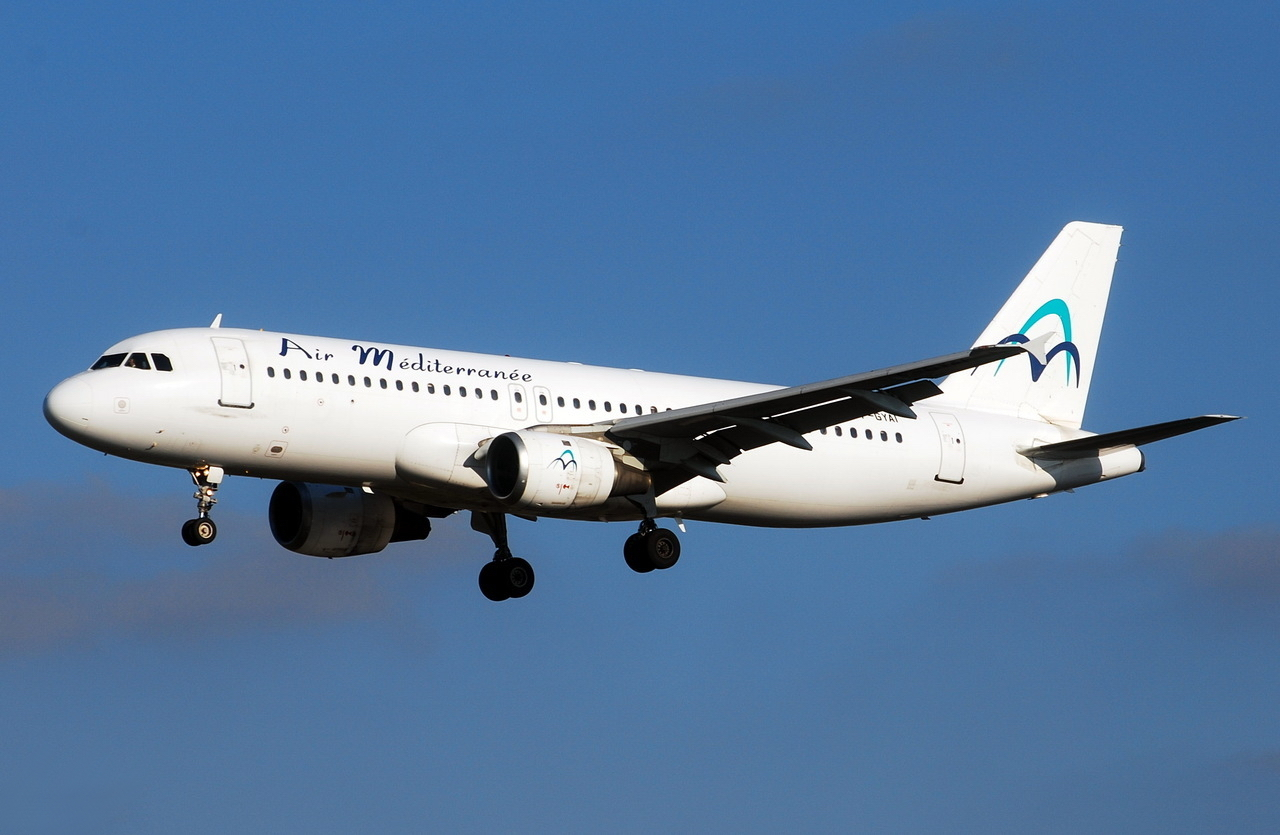
Airbus A320-200

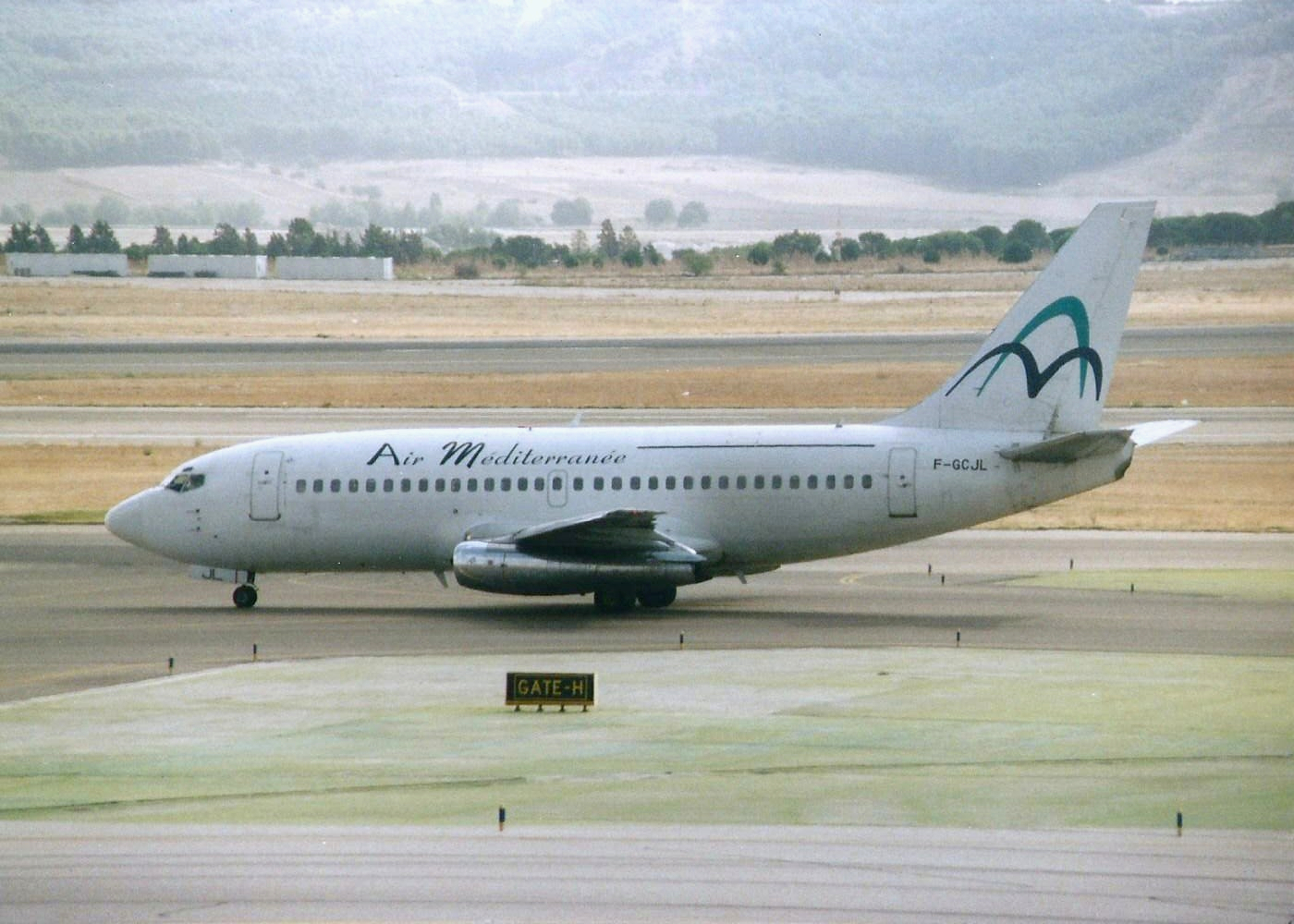
Boeing 737-200

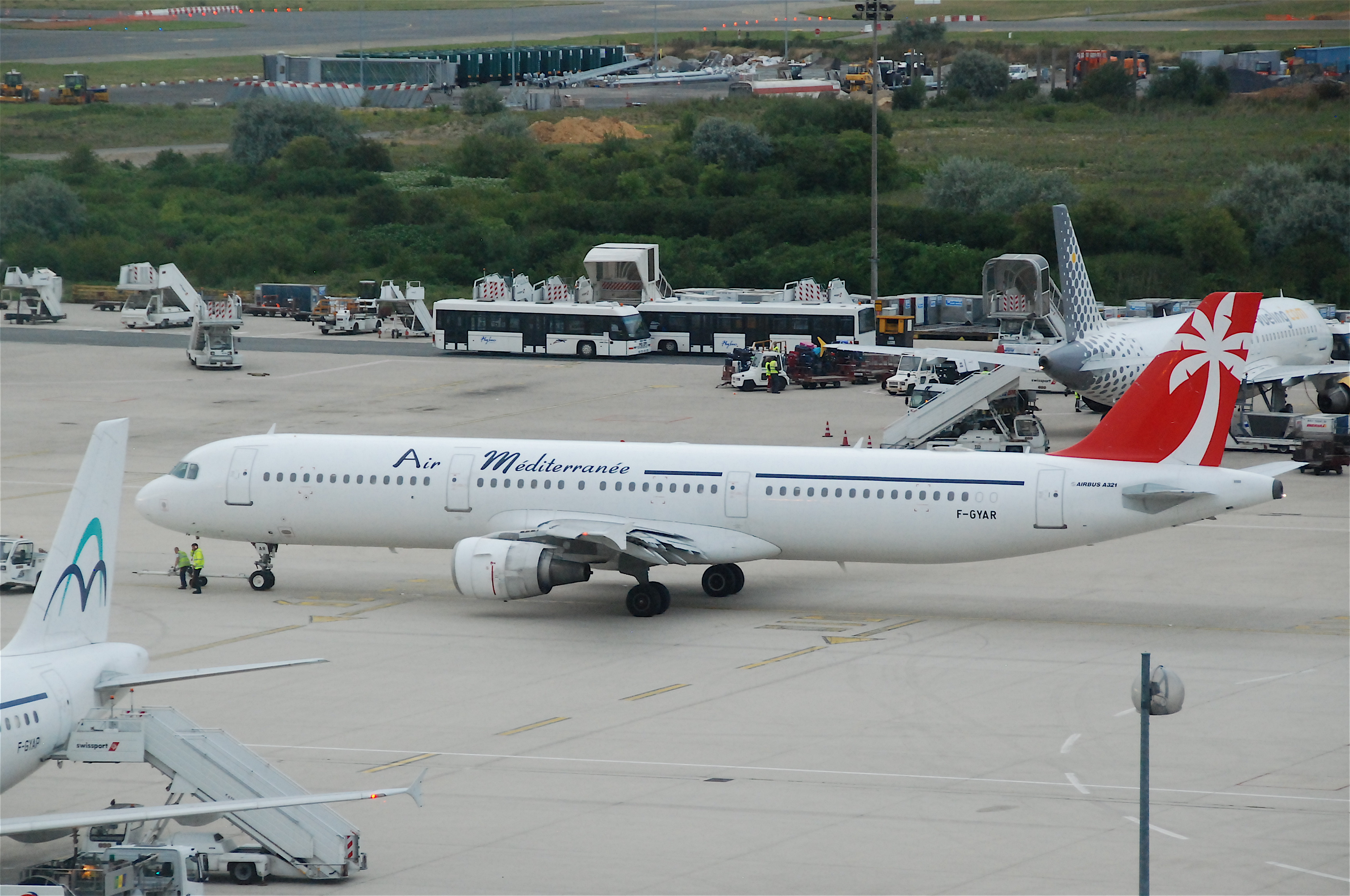
Airbus A321-200 with tail FRAM colours

Air Méditerranée was a French charter airline headquartered at Tarbes–Lourdes–Pyrénées Airport in Juillan. It operated passenger and cargo flights, mostly to and from Paris-Charles de Gaulle Airport.

== History ==
Air Midi Bigorre was established in February 1997 and started operations in the month of November of that same year with a flight from Lourdes to Milan. Headquarters were located in Le Fauga, near Toulouse. In February 1998 the corporate name was changed to Air Méditerranée. An Airbus A320 and later an Airbus A321 would be the bulk of the fleet. The latter aircraft had FRAM colours shown on the tail. In winter 2007/2008 it did instead fly in full Air Ivoire livery. In 2009 it was the 4th French airline in terms of passenger traffic (1,28 million) and flying hours (26.750). In June 2010 the first Boeing 737-500 was delivered but at the end of this same year the loss reached €uros 2.535.297.

Affected by political events in the Arab world and various protests in Greece and Senegal, the company switched to direct ticket sales in February 2011. Furthermore, in August it established the Greek subsidiary Hermes Airlines to target extra-EU markets and this did operate up to three aircraft made available by the parent. But the overall situation did not improve and by the end of the year the fleet was reduced as well as the number of flying personnel. Tensions between management and staff grew and resulted in numerous strikes and calls for air transport authorities to protect employees. The annual budgets continued to be in deficit while opposition from the flying crew grew, unlike the ground crew, who were more willing to make sacrifices to save the airline. The company voluntarily filed for receivership in January 2015 in order to continue its operations. On 15 February 2016 the airline was liquidated by the courts after amassing debts of €uros 60m and all aircraft were returned to their lessors. By January 2016, there had been offers by potential investors to secure new funds for the struggling airline with no final decision made by the authorities.

=== On board fight ===
The only incident of the airline occurred in February 2015 when a man urinated on a passenger over not being allowed to smoke. However, the victim fought back by punching the man in the face. The flight was diverted to Lyon, where both passengers were obviously and rightly arrested.

== Fleet ==
Prior to cease operations, the fleet had consisted of the following aircraft types:

Air Méditerranée fleet
Aircraft	In service	Introduced	Retired	Notes
Airbus A320-200	1	2006	2012	
Airbus A321-100	4	2003	2016	One would later be involved in Daallo Airlines Flight 159.
Airbus A321-200	3	2004	2016	
Boeing 737-200	8	1998	2005	
Boeing 737-500	4	2002	2016	
Boeing 757-200	1	2006	2007	Leased from Icelandair.
Total	21			
