= Grammar School, Dubai =

Coordinates: 25.23577°N 55.35209°E

- Al Garhoud; Dubai; United Arab Emirates

Information
- School type: Independent school
- Founded: 1970
- Authority: Knowledge and Human Development Authority
- Grades: FS1 - Year 12
- Gender: Co-Educational
- Enrolment: 1250
- Average class size: 25-30
- Education system: British National Curriculum
- School fees: 4686 - 6444 AED
- Website: http://www.grammarschool.ae/

Grammar School in Dubai is a private school located in Al Garhoud, Dubai, UAE. The school is managed by Athena Education. Grammar School follows the National Curriculum for England, offering the elementary school courses for students from FS1 up to Year 6, the middle school programme leading up to the IGCSE programme for students from Year 7 to Year 11, and the Advanced Subsidiary (AS) and A2 level programmes for students in Year 12 and Year 13. The English National Curriculum school caters to K-12 students who are an international group but are predominantly Pakistani and Indian.

== History ==
The school was established in 1970. However, the Knowledge and Human Development Authority inspectorate published its founding in 1974. The school, founded by the D'Cruz family in 1970s, was purchased by Athena Education in November 2015.
