= Denis Jourdanet =

French physiologist (1815–1892)

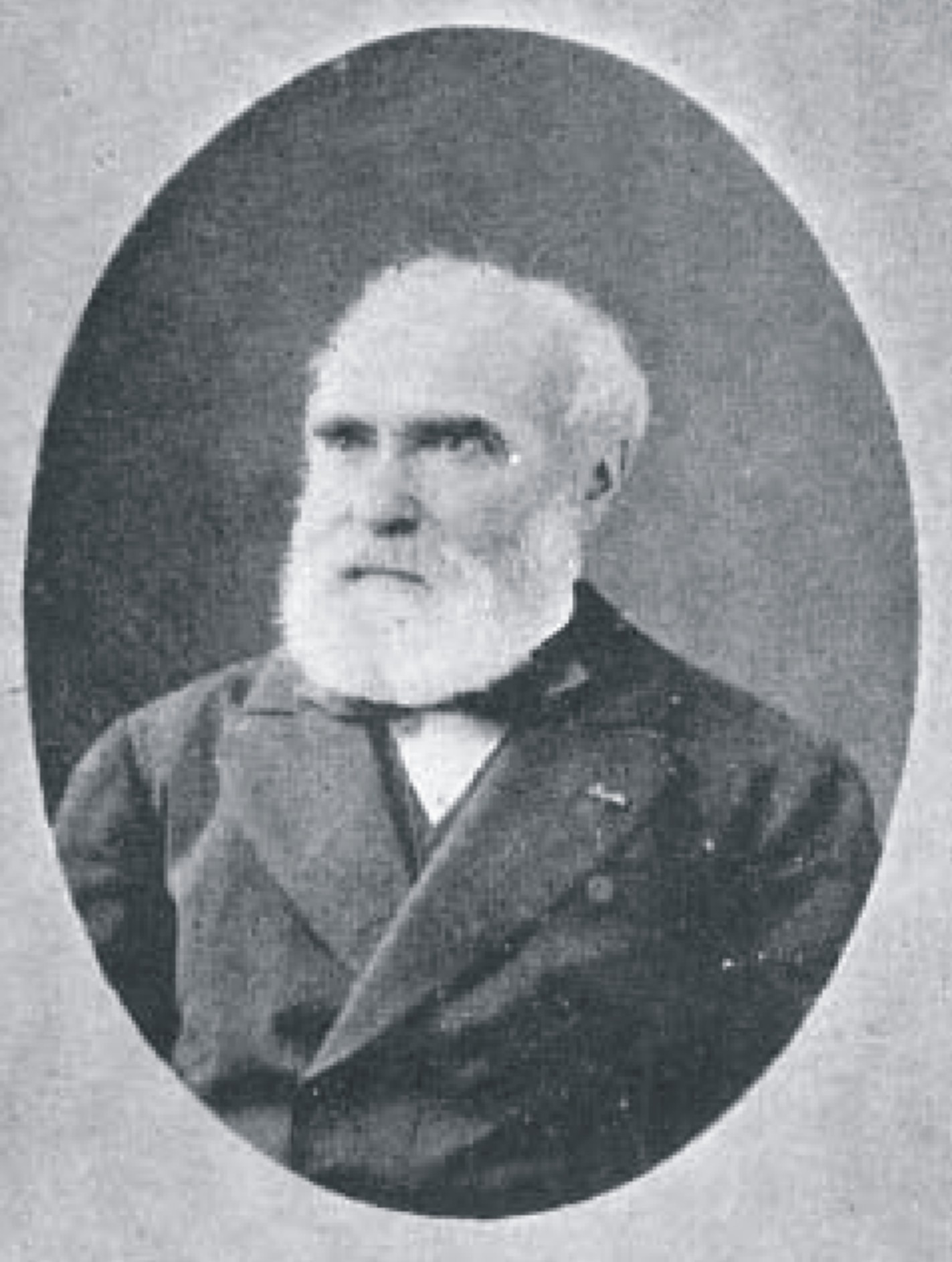
Denis Jourdanet (1815–1892)

Denis Jourdanet (1 May 1815 – 6 May 1892) was a French physician and physiologist born in Juillan, Hautes-Pyrénées. He is remembered for pioneer studies of altitude sickness and hypoxia.

As a wealthy physician, Jourdanet traveled extensively throughout mountainous regions of Mexico during the mid 19th century. Here he studied the effects of "mountain sickness" that climbers experienced at higher altitudes. From these studies he was the first person to make a connection between reduced atmospheric oxygen pressure and elevated erythrocyte (red blood cell) counts in humans. At the time Jourdanet referred to the condition as "barometric anoxemia". He was a friend and colleague to physiologist Paul Bert (1833–1886), to whom he provided the necessary equipment such as a decompression chamber for laboratory research of medical conditions caused by lowered oxygen pressure.

== Publications ==
- Influence de la pression de l'air sur la vie de l'homme. Climats d'altitude et climats de montagne. 1875
- Les altitudes de l'Amerique tropicale comparees au niveau des mers au point de vue de la constitution medicale, 1861
- De Mexique au point de vue de son influence sur la vie de l'homme, 1861
- Le Mexique et l'Amerique tropicale; climats, hygiene et maladies, 1864.
