= Dubai International School =

- مدرسة دبي الدولية

Location
- Dubai; United Arab Emirates; 25.2485°N 55.3418°E

Information
- Type: Private school
- Established: 1985
- Principal/Superintendent: Mounir Allaham
- Colors: Green; White
- Website: www.dipschool.ae

Dubai International School (DIS) (Arabic: مدرسة دبي الدولية) is an International American private school in Dubai, United Arab Emirates. The school has two branches in Dubai located in Al Garhoud and Al Quoz and serves levels from Preschool (Kindergarten), Elementary school, Middle school, and High school. school hold both a United Arab Emirates Ministry of education educational permit and a United States (California state standard) educational permit.

== History ==
Dubai International school was founded on 1 December 1985 in Garhoud, Dubai. A second branch of the school was opened in 1998 in Al Quoz, Dubai. The two branches coordinate by a director general and have the same board of directors. The school gained accreditation from AdvancED in 2012. The school is a current member of Common Core State Standards Initiative for core English and Mathematics subjects and Next Generation Science Standards for science.

The school follows the American Curriculum based on California state standards (California CCSS and NGSS) in all subjects taught and holds an educational permit licensed by the United States. The school is also fully accredited by the United Arab Emirates Ministry of Education under permit No. 218.
