= Daallo Airlines Flight 159 =

2016 aircraft bombing over Somalia

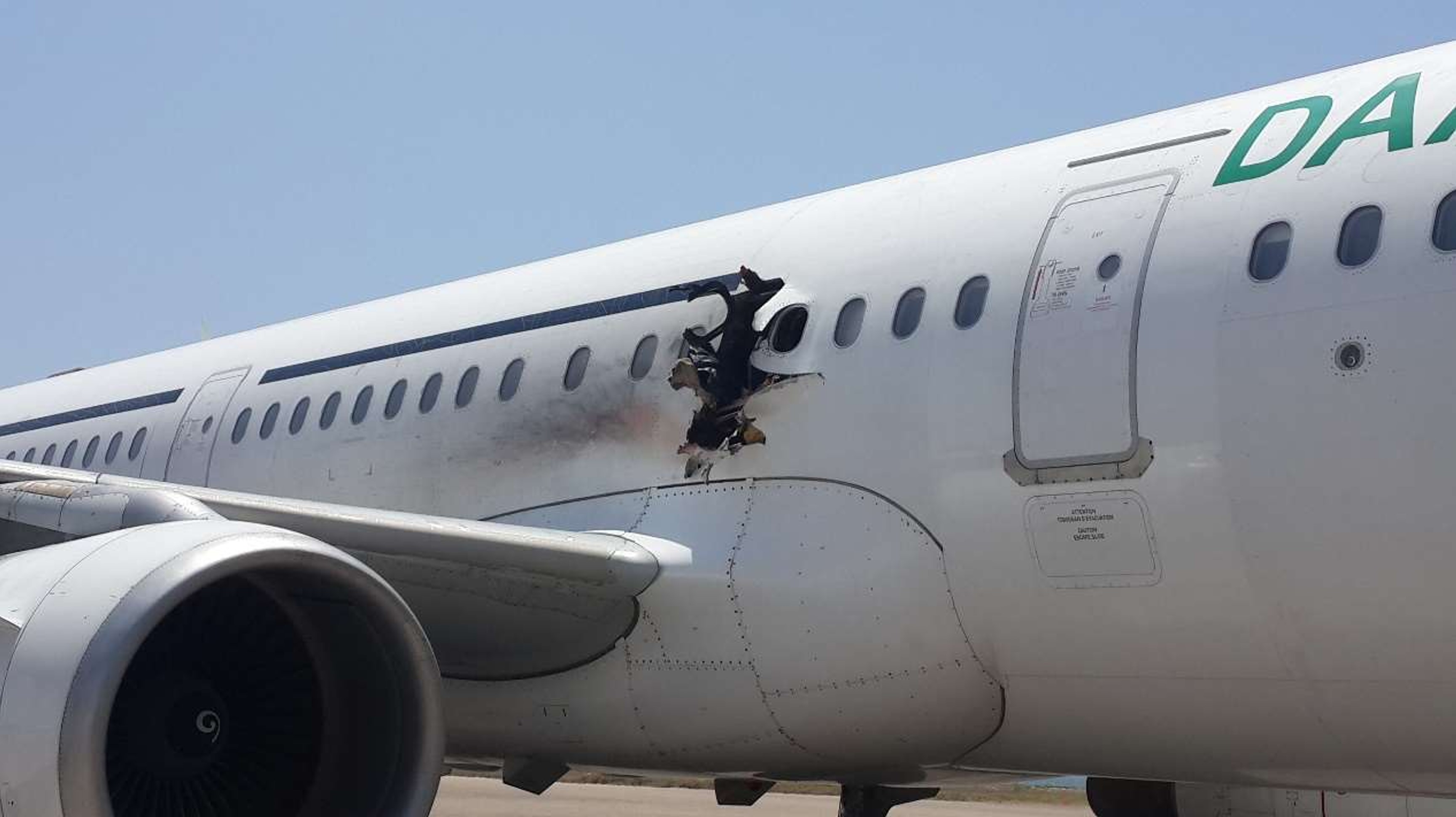
- Damage from the bombing attempt on the aircraft

Bombing
- Date: 2 February 2016
- Summary: Suicide bombing
- Site: Over Afgooye District, Somalia; 2.235667°N 45.285083°E

Aircraft
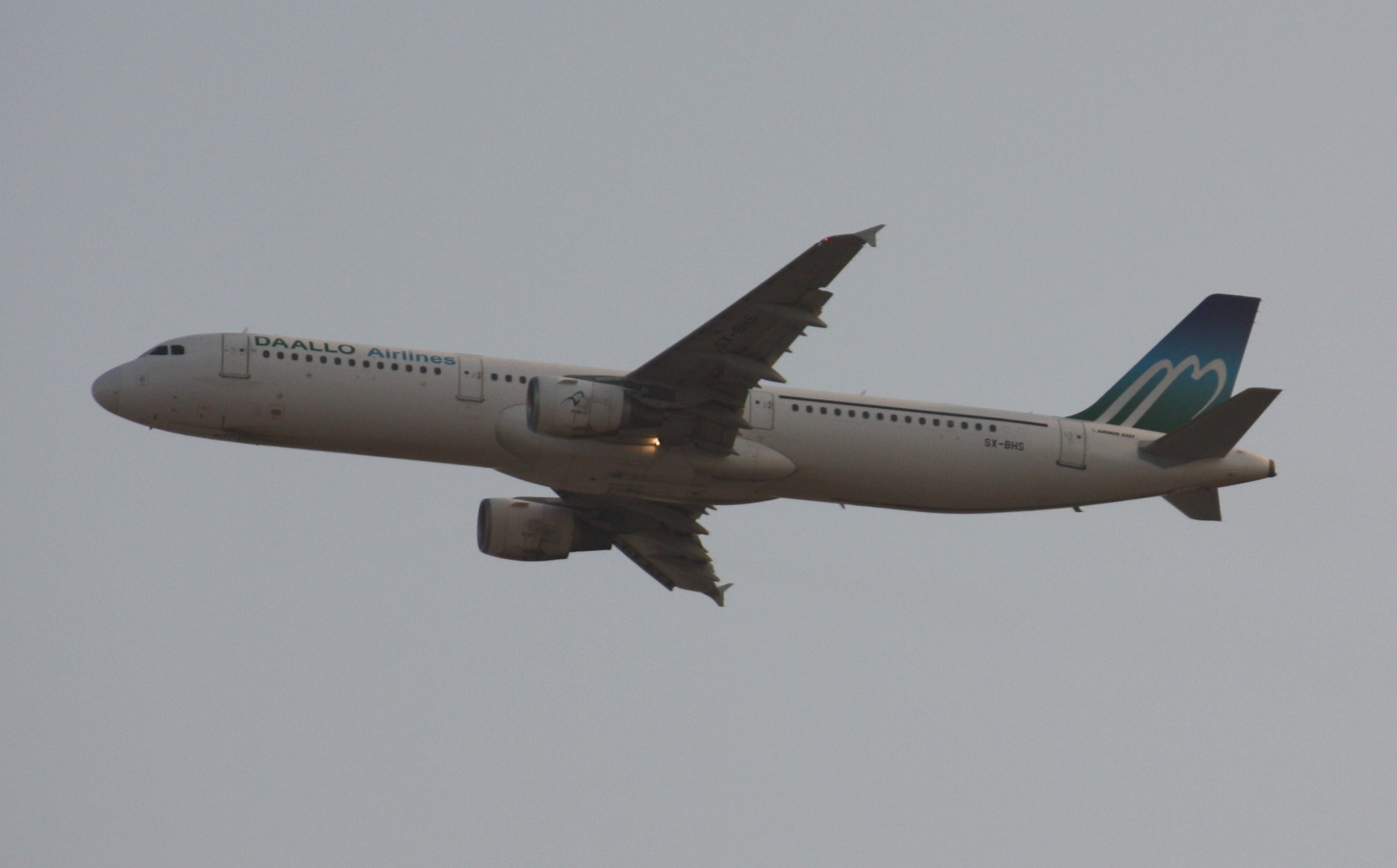
- SX-BHS, the aircraft involved, photographed in 2015
- Aircraft type: Airbus A321-111
- Operator: Daallo Airlines
- IATA flight No.: D3159
- ICAO flight No.: DAO159
- Call sign: DAALLO AIRLINES 159
- Registration: SX-BHS
- Flight origin: Aden Adde International Airport, Somalia
- Destination: Djibouti–Ambouli International Airport, Djibouti
- Occupants: 81
- Passengers: 74
- Crew: 7
- Fatalities: 1
- Injuries: 3
- Survivors: 80

Map of Somalia with Aden Adde International Airport (MGQ), Djibouti–Ambouli International Airport (JIB) and Balad, the location where the burnt body was found.

Daallo Airlines Flight 159 was a scheduled international passenger flight operated by Somali-owned Daallo Airlines. On 2 February 2016, the flight was the target of a terrorist attack, and an explosion occurred on board the aircraft 20 minutes after it took off from Mogadishu. The aircraft was able to return to the airport safely with the only fatality being the bomber who planned the attack. A subsequent investigation indicated that the explosion was caused by a bomb detonated in a suicide attack. The Islamist militant group Al-Shabaab claimed responsibility for the bombing. A total of ten people were convicted in relation to the plot.

== Aircraft ==
The aircraft involved was a 19-year-old Airbus A321-111 with registration SX-BHS, owned by Hermes Airlines and operated by Daallo Airlines at the time of the incident. The aircraft was delivered to Daallo Airlines on 5 January 2015. The aircraft had previously been operated by Hermes Airlines, Air Méditerranée, Myanmar Airways International and Swissair. The aircraft's manufacturer serial number (MSN) was 642 and it first flew on 6 January 1997. The aircraft was delivered to Swissair on 21 January 1997. It was equipped with two CFM International CFM56 engines and had a 220-seat economy-only configuration. As the damage to the fuselage was substantial, the aircraft was written off after the incident.

Flight 159’s captain was 64-year-old Serbian Vladimir "Vlatko" Vodopivec; the first officer was 24-year-old Italian Riccardo Bonaldi, he was assigned to fly the aircraft while Captain Vodopivec monitored the aircraft’s instruments. Both pilots were certified to fly and had valid medical licenses.

== Incident ==
External videos
- Video from onboard the aircraft showing passengers being moved to the back of the plane
- CCTV camera footage showing the laptop suspected to have caused the blast

On 2 February 2016, 20 minutes after taking off from Mogadishu, Somalia, at 11:00 local time, en route to Djibouti City, at an altitude of about 14,000 ft (4,300 m), an explosion occurred on board the aircraft, opening a hole in the fuselage behind the R2 door. It was reported that the explosion was most likely close to seats 15/16F, abeam the forward wing root and the fuel tanks. There were 74 passengers and 7 crew on board at the time of the incident.

Reacting to the explosion, flight attendants moved passengers to the rear of the aircraft. The pilots alerted Mogadishu tower, reporting a pressurisation problem, but did not declare an emergency. The aircraft returned to Aden Adde International Airport and performed an emergency landing. There were three injuries on board, and the burnt body of the suicide bomber fell from the aircraft, landing in the town of Dhiiqaaley near Balad, Somalia; it was found by nearby residents.

The flight had been delayed before departure, so at the time of the explosion the aircraft was not yet at cruising altitude and the cabin was not yet fully pressurized. It was thought that a laptop had been rigged with a timer device to explode the bomb mid-flight. The pilot reported that if the flight had not been delayed 20 minutes (awaiting additional passengers to board), then the aircraft would have been at cruising altitude by then, which could have been a catastrophic situation.

According to Mohamed Ibrahim Yassin Olad, the CEO of Daallo Airlines, the suicide bomber and 69 of the 73 other passengers on board were meant to board a Turkish Airlines flight, which was cancelled on the morning of 2 February due to poor weather conditions. This resulted in Daallo Airlines rerouting the passengers to Djibouti, where they were to be transferred to a Turkish Airlines flight. The cancellation of the Turkish Airlines flight was confirmed by Yahya Ustun, a spokesman for the company.

== Investigation ==
Somalia's Air Accident Investigation Authority (SAAIA) stated on 3 February that one person was missing from the aircraft once it had returned to Mogadishu and later confirmed that the missing person's body was found near Balad. An investigation into the bombing was carried out by the National Intelligence and Security Agency, with the cooperation of airport authorities and local police. Daallo Airlines, in a statement, said that a technical team of Hermes Airlines, the owner of the aircraft, as well as the aircraft's manufacturer, Airbus, played a role in the active investigation. The FBI also contributed its efforts to the investigation.

Initial tests of the damage on Flight 159 confirmed traces of explosive residue. It is thought that a bomb, possibly hidden within a laptop, was carried onto the aircraft by a person in a wheelchair. The passenger was believed to have been transferred into a regular seat after being brought onto the plane. Two passengers on the plane, including one who was sitting in the next seat, were arrested on suspicion of being accomplices. On 6 February, Transport Minister Ali Ahmed Jama confirmed that the explosion was caused by a bomb that "was meant to kill all onboard."

Somali authorities identified the deceased passenger as Abdullahi Abdisalam Borleh, a 55-year-old male from Mogadishu, the capital of Somalia, but did not confirm that he was suspected of being the suicide bomber. Borleh was a teacher at an Islamic school, and said he was going abroad for health reasons according to Sheikh Mohamed Abdullahi, a mosque imam in Mogadishu. A Somali federal official stated that Borleh had been monitored by security agents, "but we had never considered him to be dangerous." A senior Somalia immigration official said that Borleh had obtained a Turkish visa to work in Turkey as an adviser for the foreign ministry. A letter was allegedly sent from the Somali Embassy in Ankara to the Turkish Embassy in Mogadishu asking the Turkish Embassy to facilitate a visa for Borleh to be "an adviser to the Minister of Foreign Affairs and Investment Promotions." The Somali Embassy in Ankara denied sending any such letter.

A security camera recording from the airport shows two men, seemingly airport workers, giving a laptop to Borleh. US officials have said that investigators believe the bomber had some type of connection to airline or airport personnel.

At least 20 people, including government officials and the two airline employees, were arrested on suspicion of being linked to the attack. The Serbian captain, Vlatko Vodopivec, criticised the lack of security around the aircraft at the airport, describing the facility as "chaotic." In an interview with the Associated Press, Vodopivec explained that "the security is zero. When we park there, some 20 to 30 people come to the tarmac ... No one has a badge or those yellow vests. They enter and leave the aircraft, and no one knows who is who... They can put anything inside when passengers leave the aircraft."

Mohamed Ibrahim Yassin Olad, the CEO of Daallo Airlines, stated that the airline would keep flying to Somalia, despite the incident. "We have been there for 25 years," he said. "Our efforts to keep Somalia linked to the rest of the world will continue."

On 13 February, eleven days after the incident, the Islamist militant group Al-Shabaab, in an email statement, claimed responsibility for the attack stating that it was "retribution for the crimes committed by the coalition of Western crusaders and their intelligence agencies against the Muslims of Somalia." Al-Shabaab also said that it targeted Turkish Airlines because Turkey is a NATO state supporting Western operations in Somalia and that they were targeting Western intelligence officials and Turkish NATO soldiers who were on board.

== Criminal convictions ==
On 30 May 2016, a Somali military court found two men guilty of planning the plot and of being members of al-Shabaab and sentenced them to life in prison. One of the two men was a former security official at the airport and the other, who financed the attack, had eluded arrest and was tried in absentia. Eight other airport workers were convicted of aiding the plot, but were not convicted of being members of al-Shabaab, and were given prison sentences ranging from six months to four years. They had a number of roles at the airport including security screeners, a police officer, a porter, and immigration officers.

== See also ==
- Accidents and incidents involving the Airbus A320 family
- Metrojet Flight 9268 – A fatal aircraft bombing incident involving another A321
- Northwest Airlines Flight 253 – A failed bombing attempt involving an A330
