= Al Garhoud =

Community in Dubai, the United Arab Emirates

Al Garhoud Arabic: ٱلْقَرْهُوْد
- Community
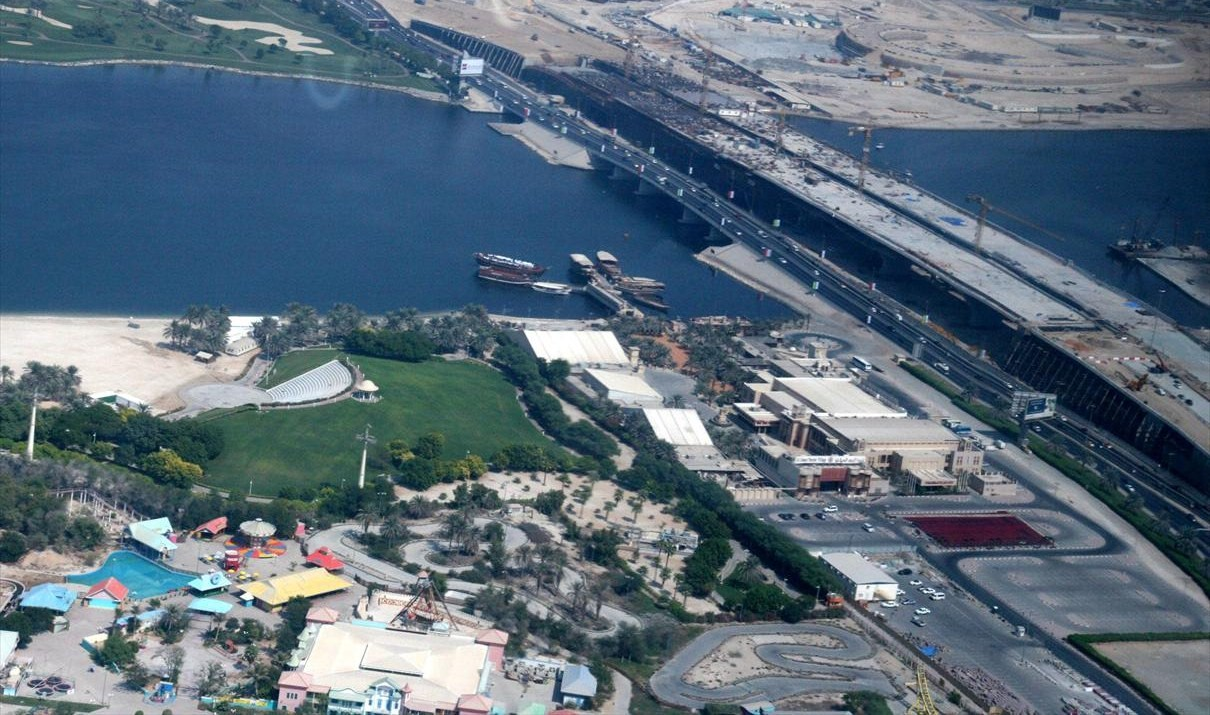
- This is a photo showing the New Al Garhoud Bridge, crossing Dubai Creek in Dubai, United Arab Emirates, on 18 October 2007

- Location of Al Garhoud in the UAE Al Garhoud (United Arab Emirates) Al Garhoud (Persian Gulf) Al Garhoud (Middle East) Al Garhoud (West and Central Asia)
- Coordinates: 25°14′24″N 55°21′1″E
- Country: United Arab Emirates
- Emirate: Dubai
- City: Dubai

Area
  - Total: 4 km^{2} (1.5 sq mi)

Population (2000)
  - Total: 4,466
  - Density: 1,100/km^{2} (2,900/sq mi)
- Community number: 214

Al Garhoud (Arabic: ٱلْقَرْهُوْد, Al-Qarhūd), or simply Garhoud, is a commercial and residential zone in Dubai, United Arab Emirates. It is bounded by Port Saeed to the west, Umm Ramool to the east, Dubai International Airport to the north and Al Kheeran to the south.

== Description ==
The Emirates Airline/Emirates Group head office, Emirates Aviation College and Dubai Airport terminals 1 & 3 are in Garhoud. Daallo Airlines has its head office in the airport Free Zone. Al Garhoud Bridge is a major part of this area which crosses Dubai Creek, and connects it with both communities of Deira and Sharjah and the district of Bur Dubai. The bridge is 52.5 feet (16.0 metres), above the water.

The roads around Al Garhoud are notorious for their traffic.

=== Schools ===
- Cambridge International School, Dubai
- New Indian Model School, Dubai
- Gulf Indian High School
- Al Mawakeb School - Al Garhoud
- Grammar School, Dubai
- GEMS Legacy School
- Dubai International School

== See also ==
- Al Garhoud Bridge
