= Daallo Airlines =

Somali-owned airline

Daallo Airlines Diyarada Ee Daallo طيران دالو
IATA	ICAO	Call sign
D3	DAO	DAALLO AIRLINES
- Founded: 1991
- Commenced operations: 20 March 1991; 34 years ago
- Hubs: Mogadishu
- Fleet size: 4
- Destinations: 9
- Parent company: African Airways Alliance
- Headquarters: Al Garhoud, Dubai, United Arab Emirates
- Website: www.daallo.com

Daallo Airlines is a Somali-owned airline based at Dubai Airport Free Zone in Al Garhoud, Dubai, United Arab Emirates. The airline operates scheduled services in the Horn of Africa and the Middle East. It is banned from flying in the European Union.

== History ==
Daallo Airlines was established in 1991 in Djibouti by Mohammed Ibrahim Yassin Olad. It began operations on 20 March 1991. As of March 2000, the carrier had 42 employees; its fleet was composed of two Antonov An-24RV, one Let 410 UVP-E and two Tupolev Tu-154M that served Berbera, Borama, Bossaso, Dire Dawa, Djibouti, Dubai, Hargeisa, Jeddah, Mogadishu, and Sharjah.

In March 2010, all flight operations were suspended, resuming later in the year.

In February 2015, Daallo Airlines merged with Jubba Airways to form the new holding company African Airways Alliance. Both airlines continue to operate under separate brands.

== Destinations ==
As of April 2025, Daallo Airlines serves the following scheduled destinations:

Country	City	Airport	Notes	Refs
Kenya	Nairobi	Jomo Kenyatta International Airport	—	
Saudi Arabia	Jeddah	King Abdulaziz International Airport	—	
Somalia	Bosaso	Bosaso Airport	—	
Somalia	Garowe	Garowe Airport	—	
Somalia	Mogadishu	Aden Adde International Airport	Base	
Somalia	Hargeisa	Hargeisa Egal Airport	—	
United Arab Emirates	Dubai	Dubai International Airport	—	

== Fleet ==
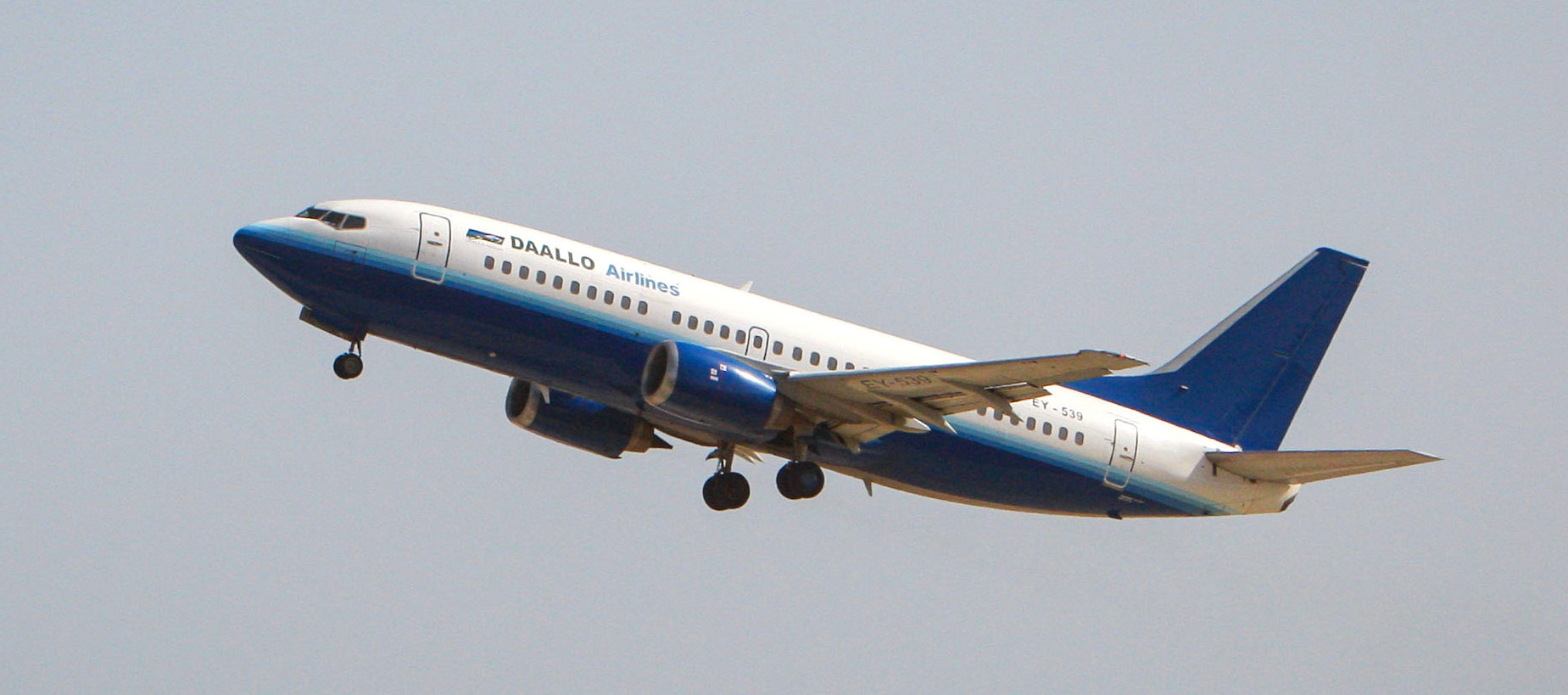
Daallo Airlines Boeing 737-300

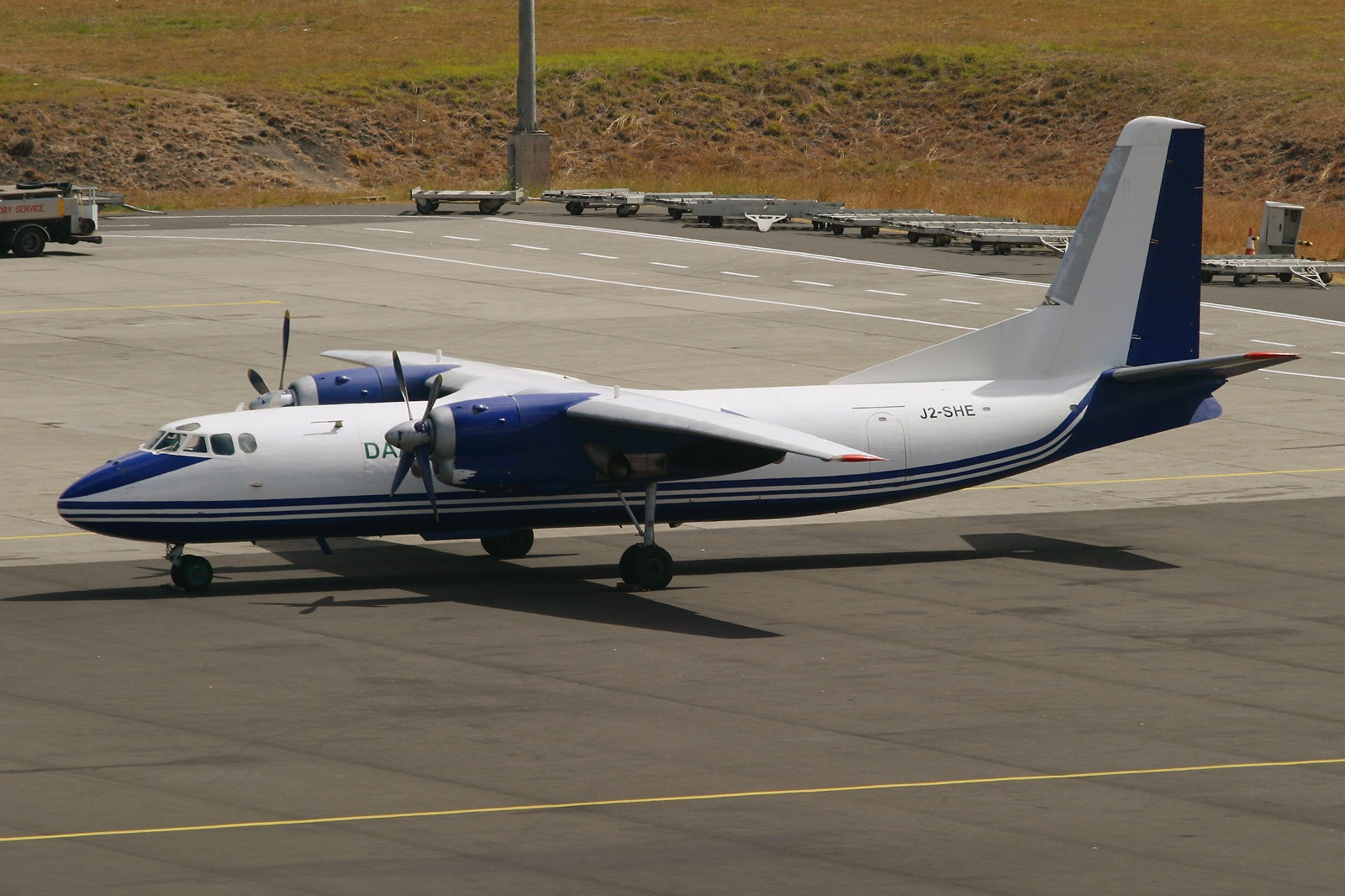
A former Daallo Airlines Antonov An-24 cargo aircraft

=== Current fleet ===
As of June 2025, the Daallo Airlines fleet consisted of the following aircraft:

Daallo Airlines
Aircraft	In Fleet	Order	Passengers	Notes
Boeing 737-300	1	—	142	
Boeing 737-400	2	—	146	
Bombardier Dash 8 Q400	1	—	76	(as of August 2025)
Total	4	—		

Daallo Airlines has publicly expressed interest in expanding its fleet with Boeing 737-800s and Bombardier Dash 8-300s, as reported in early 2023.

=== Former fleet ===
Daallo Airlines formerly also operated many of owned or leased aircraft types:

- Antonov An-12
- Antonov An-24
- Ilyushin Il-18
- Ilyushin Il-76
- Boeing 727-200
- Boeing 757-200
- Boeing 767
- Let L-410 Turbolet
- Tupolev Tu-154

== Accidents and incidents ==
Date	Location	Aircraft	Registration	Aircraft damage	Fatalities	Description	Refs
2 November 2009	Bosaso	Antonov An-24	EY-47693	None	0	Two men unsuccessfully attempted to hijack an Antonov airplane operated by Daallo Airlines on a flight from Bosaso to Djibouti. Armed passengers confronted the alleged hijackers when the two men drew their weapons, allowing the pilots to return the plane to Bosaso. None of the thirty passengers were harmed, and the aircraft was undamaged.	
13 November 2009	Mogadishu	Antonov An-24	–	None	0	A man tried to board a Daallo Airlines flight in Mogadishu bound for Hargeisa, Djibouti and Dubai carrying powdered chemicals, liquid and a syringe. The incident bore similarities to the failed attempt to blow up Northwest Airlines Flight 253 travelling to Detroit from Amsterdam on Christmas Day, 2009. The man was arrested and taken into Somali police custody.	
2 February 2016	Mogadishu	Airbus A321	SX-BHS	Hole in fuselage, damage from subsequent fire	1	Five minutes after taking off from Mogadishu en route to Djibouti, a bomb exploded aboard Flight 159, opening a hole in the fuselage behind the 2R door. Pilots were able to land the plane at Aden Adde International Airport. Two injuries were reported and one man was claimed to have been pulled from the plane during or after the explosion, landing in the town of Dhiiqaaley near Balad, Somalia. The Islamic terrorist group Al-Shabaab later claimed responsibility for the bombing.	
