= Elman =

Elman may refer to:

- El Maan, a town in south-central Somalia
- Elman FC, a Somali football club
- Elman (name)

== See also ==
- Ellman, a surname
