= Ellerman =

Ellerman is a surname. Notable people with the surname include:

- David Ellerman (born 1943), philosopher working in economics, political economy, social theory, philosophy and mathematics
- Derek Ellerman (born 1978), the co-founder and board chair of Polaris Project, a Washington DC–based organization
- Ferdinand Ellerman (1869–1940), American astronomer and photographer
- John Ellerman, CH (1862–1933), English shipowner and investor
- Sir John Ellerman, 2nd Baronet (1910–1973), English shipowner, natural historian and philanthropist
- Juul Ellerman (born 1965), Dutch former international footballer

== See also ==
- Ellerman (crater), lunar crater on the far side of the Moon
- Ellerman bombs, micro solar flares named after Ferdinand Ellerman
- Ellerman Lines, cargo and passenger shipping company that operated from the late 19th century into the 20th century
- Elman (name, surname), Ellman, Ellmann, Ellemann, Ellerman, Ellermann
