= NMIA =

NMIA may refer to:

- Navi Mumbai International Airport, an international airport in Navi Mumbai, Maharashtra, India
- New Manila International Airport, an upcoming international airport in Bulacan, Philippines
- New Mogadishu International Airport, an upcoming international airport in Mogadishu, Somalia
- Norman Manley International Airport, an international airport in Kingston, Jamaica
