= Boggess =

Boggess is a surname. Notable people with the surname include:

- Dusty Boggess (1904–1968), American baseball umpire
- Effie Boggess (1927–2021), American politician
- Nancy Boggess (1925–2019), American astrophysicist
- Sierra Boggess (born 1982), American actress and singer
