= Nancy Grace Roman =

American astronomer (1925–2018)

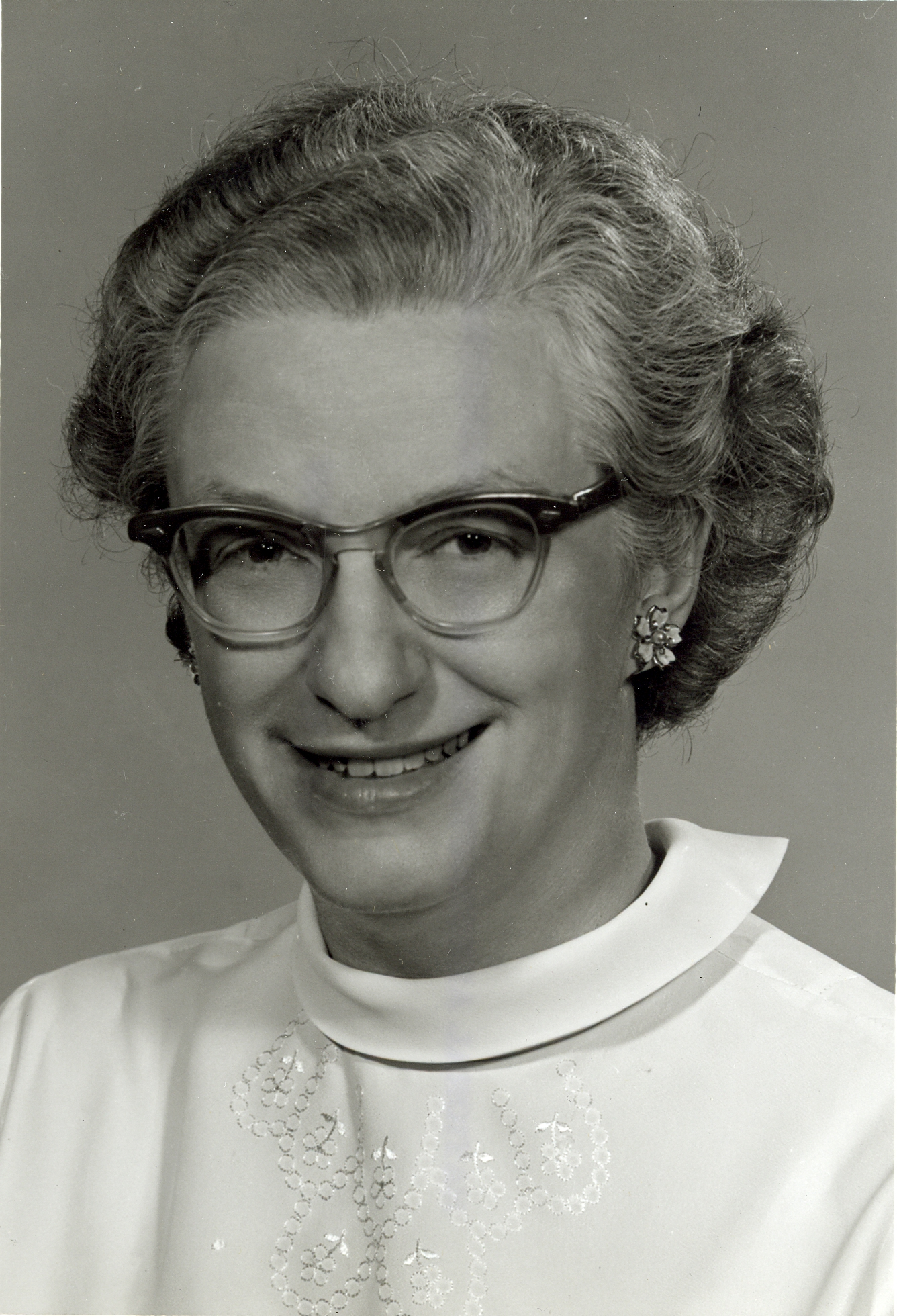
- Roman in 1969
- Born: May 16, 1925; Nashville, Tennessee, U.S.
- Died: December 25, 2018 (aged 93); Germantown, Maryland, U.S.
- Education: Swarthmore College; University of Chicago
- Known for: Planning of the Hubble Space Telescope
- Awards: See list: Federal Woman's Award; Exceptional Scientific Achievement Medal, NASA; NASA Outstanding Scientific Leadership Award; Fellow, American Astronautical Society; William Randolph Lovelace II Award, American Astronautical Association; Fellow of the American Association for the Advancement of Science; Lifetime Achievement Award – Women in Aerospace
- Scientific career
- Fields: Astronomy
- Workplaces: Yerkes Observatory, University of Chicago, NASA, Naval Research Laboratory
- Thesis: Ursa Major Moving Group (1949)
- Doctoral advisor: William Wilson Morgan
- Other academic advisors: W.W. Morgan, Peter van de Kamp

Nancy Grace Roman (May 16, 1925 – December 25, 2018) was an American astronomer who made important contributions to stellar classification and stellar motions. The first female executive at NASA, Roman served as NASA's first chief of astronomy throughout the 1960s and 1970s, establishing her as one of the "visionary founders of the US civilian space program".

Roman created NASA's space astronomy program and is known to many as the "Mother of Hubble" for her foundational role in planning the Hubble Space Telescope. Throughout her career, Roman was an active public speaker and educator, and an advocate for women in the sciences.

In May 2020, NASA administrator Jim Bridenstine announced that the Wide Field Infrared Survey Telescope would be named the Nancy Grace Roman Space Telescope in recognition of her enduring contributions to astronomy.

== Early life ==
Nancy Grace Roman was born in Nashville, Tennessee, to music teacher Georgia Frances Smith Roman and physicist/mathematician Irwin Roman. Her father took a job as a geophysicist for an oil company and the family moved to Oklahoma three months after Roman's birth. Roman and her parents later moved to Texas, New Jersey, Michigan, and then Nevada in 1936, when her father joined the Civil Service in geophysical research.

When she was about 12 years old, the family moved to Baltimore, Maryland, when Irwin Roman was hired as Senior Geophysicist at the Baltimore office of the U.S. Geological Survey. Roman considered her parents to be major influences in her interest in science.

When Roman was 11 years old, she formed an astronomy club, gathering with classmates once a week and learning about constellations from books. Although discouraged by those around her, Roman knew by seventh grade that she would dedicate her life to astronomy. She attended Western High School in Baltimore where she participated in an accelerated program, graduating in three years.

== Education ==
=== Swarthmore ===
Roman attended Swarthmore College, intending to study astronomy. The dean of women was not encouraging in this. Roman said "if you insisted on majoring in science or engineering, she wouldn't have anything more to do with you". The dean referred her to the astronomy department, then chaired by Peter van de Kamp, who was initially discouraging, but did teach her astronomy. She worked on the two student telescopes that had previously been defunct. Roman says that helped with "getting a feel for instruments and instrumentation and just having the fun of playing around with observing techniques."

In her sophomore year, Roman began working at the Sproul Observatory processing astronomical photographic plates, inheriting Van de Kamp's ethos that since he had used "plates taken by his predecessors 50 years earlier," he felt obliged "to replace those with plates that his successors would use 50 years in the future". Van de Kamp taught Roman in a solo lecture course on astrometry, encouraging her to learn about professional astronomy through use of the astronomy library. She graduated in February 1946, and van de Kamp suggested that she continue studies at the University of Chicago, which was rebuilding its astronomy department after World War II. Years later, Roman remained involved with her alma mater, serving on the Swarthmore Board of Managers from 1980 to 1988.

=== Chicago/Yerkes ===
Roman started graduate school at the University of Chicago in March 1946. Finding the classes easier than at Swarthmore, she approached three professors, Otto Struve, George van Biesbroeck, and William Wilson Morgan, asking each for an observational astronomy project to work on. The first gave her a theory project, the second a data analysis project, and Morgan provided an observational project using a 12-inch (30 cm) telescope, most likely the refractor from the Kenwood Astrophysical Observatory. Although Morgan was initially dismissive of Roman, at one point not speaking to her for six months, he continued to support her research. She received her Ph.D. in astronomy in 1949, having written a dissertation on the Ursa Major Moving Group.

After a two-month break at the Warner and Swasey Observatory, Roman was invited by Morgan to be his research associate at Yerkes Observatory. She worked at Yerkes for six years, traveling frequently to the McDonald Observatory in Texas (which at the time was managed by the University of Chicago), and once to the David Dunlap Observatory in Toronto, supported by the Office of Naval Research. The research position was not permanent, so Roman became an instructor and later, an assistant professor.

At Yerkes, Roman's research focused on stellar spectroscopy, emphasizing F and G type stars and high-velocity stars. Her work produced some of the most highly-cited papers of the time, including, in 1950, three top-100 papers in a single year, with over 3,000 citations. She was offered research positions at Wayne State University and the University of Southern California, but turned them down because she felt those institutions lacked sufficient astronomical instrumentation, an issue of great importance to her.

Roman visited Argonne National Laboratory in order to use their new astrometry device for measuring photographic plates, but was unable to convince Yerkes to acquire one. In 1954, she advocated for the purchase of a then-novel digital computer for data analysis, but was turned down by department chair Subrahmanyan Chandrasekhar, who declared computers not useful for this purpose. Roman eventually left her job at the university because of the scarcity of tenured research positions available to women; the university had never appointed a woman to the academic staff. Gerard Kuiper recommended to her a position at the Naval Research Laboratory in the new field of radio astronomy.

== Professional work ==
=== Research career ===
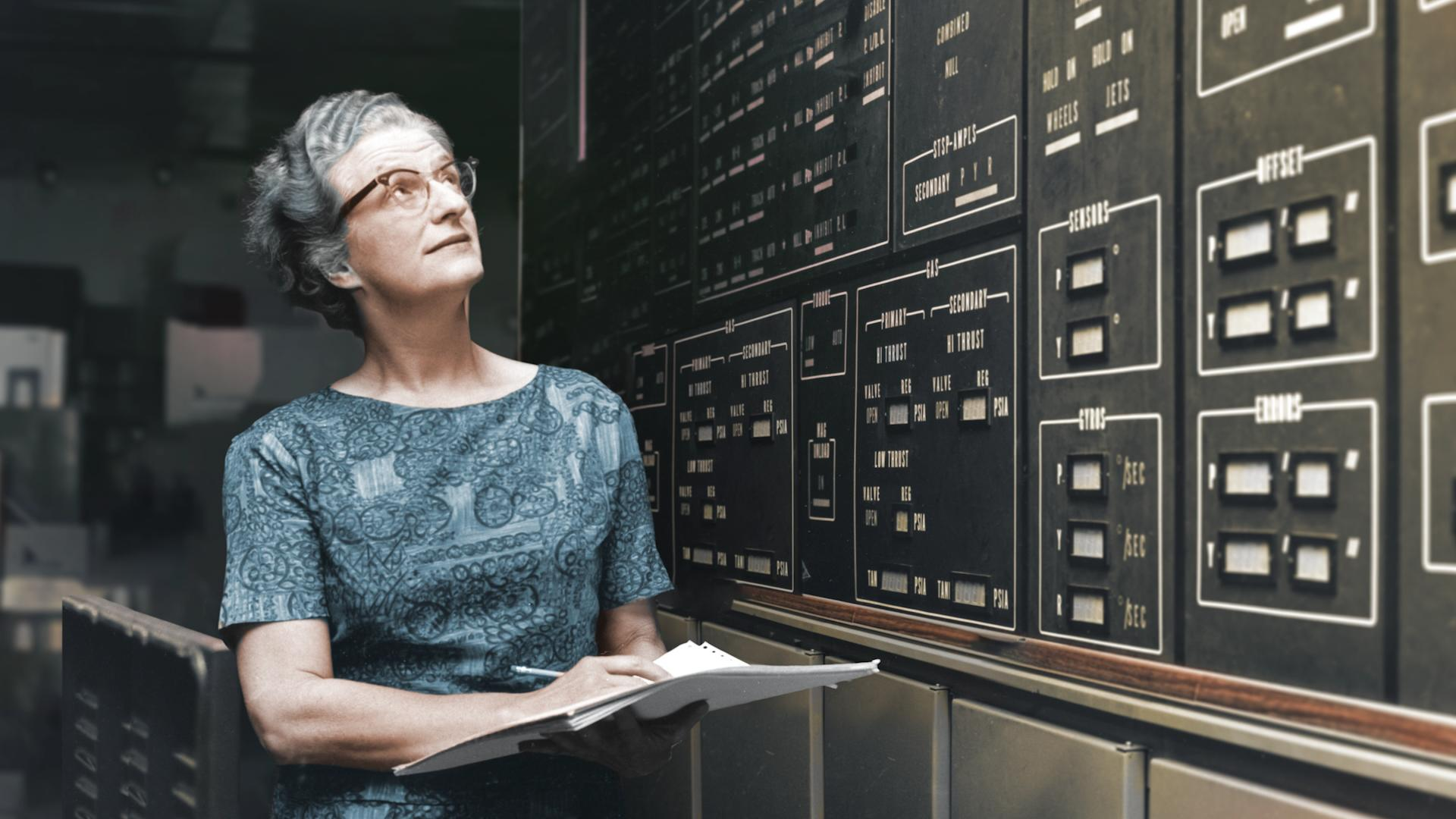
Roman at NASA's Goddard Space Flight Center in Greenbelt, Maryland, around 1972

Roman conducted a survey of all naked-eye stars similar to the Sun and realized that they could be divided into two categories by chemical content and motion through the galaxy. One of her discoveries was that stars with smaller amounts of elements heavier than hydrogen and helium move faster than stars that have more heavy elements. Another discovery was finding that not all common stars were the same age. That was proven by comparing hydrogen lines of the low dispersion spectra in the stars.

Roman noticed that the stars with the stronger lines moved closer to the center of the Milky Way and the others moved in more elliptical patterns, off the plane of the galaxy. These fundamental observations of the structure of the galaxy provided the first clue to its formation and laid the foundation for later work. Her paper was selected as one of the 100 most important papers in 100 years by the Astrophysical Journal.

While working at Yerkes Observatory of the University of Chicago, Roman observed the star AG Draconis and discovered that its emission spectrum had completely changed since earlier observations. She later credited the publication of her discovery as a stroke of luck—the star is in that state only 2–3% of the time—that substantially raised her profile within the astronomical community, advancing her career.

In 1955, the Astrophysical Journal Supplement Series published her catalog of high-velocity stars, which documented new "spectral types, photoelectric magnitudes and colors, and spectroscopic parallaxes for about 600 high-velocity stars." Her "UV excess" method became widely used by astronomers to find stars with more heavy elements using only the colors of the stars rather than having to take spectra. In 1959, Roman wrote a paper on the detection of exoplanets. She also did research and published on the subjects of locating constellations from their 1875.0 positions.

=== Naval Research Laboratory ===
After leaving the University of Chicago, Roman went to the Naval Research Laboratory and entered the radio astronomy program in 1954. Radio astronomy was then a very young field in the United States, and the NRL had taken an early lead by building the largest accurate radio telescope in 1951, a 50-foot (15 m) parabolic antenna located on top of one of its research buildings. Roman's work at the NRL included radio astronomy, geodesy, and even the propagation of sound underwater. She spent three years there, rising to become head of the microwave spectroscopy section of the radio astronomy program.

One of the few people at the NRL in radio astronomy with a classical astronomy background, she was consulted on a wide variety of topics. During Roman's time at the NRL, she provided astronomy consultation for the Project Vanguard satellite program, although she did not formally work on any of the rocket projects. However, her consultations introduced her to space astronomy. At the time, she was concerned that the science being done in the rocket projects was not of high quality, though she saw the potential of space astronomy.

Roman's radio astronomy work included mapping much of the Milky Way galaxy at a frequency of 440 MHz, determining the spectral break in the nonthermal radio emission. She pioneered the use of radio astronomy in geodetic work, including radar ranging to improve our calculation of the distance to the Moon at a wavelength of 10 cm (2.86 GHz). Roman presented this at a geodesy conference in 1959 as the best way to determine the mass of the Earth.

While at the NRL, Roman received an invitation to speak on her work with stars in Armenia, then in the Soviet Union, in 1956 for the dedication of the Byurakan Observatory. This cemented her international reputation, and she was the first civilian to visit Armenia after the start of the Cold War. The visit raised her visibility in the United States, with invitations to speak about the trip leading to a series of astronomy lectures. Her reputation was well established, including with people at the newly formed National Aeronautics and Space Administration (NASA).

=== NASA ===
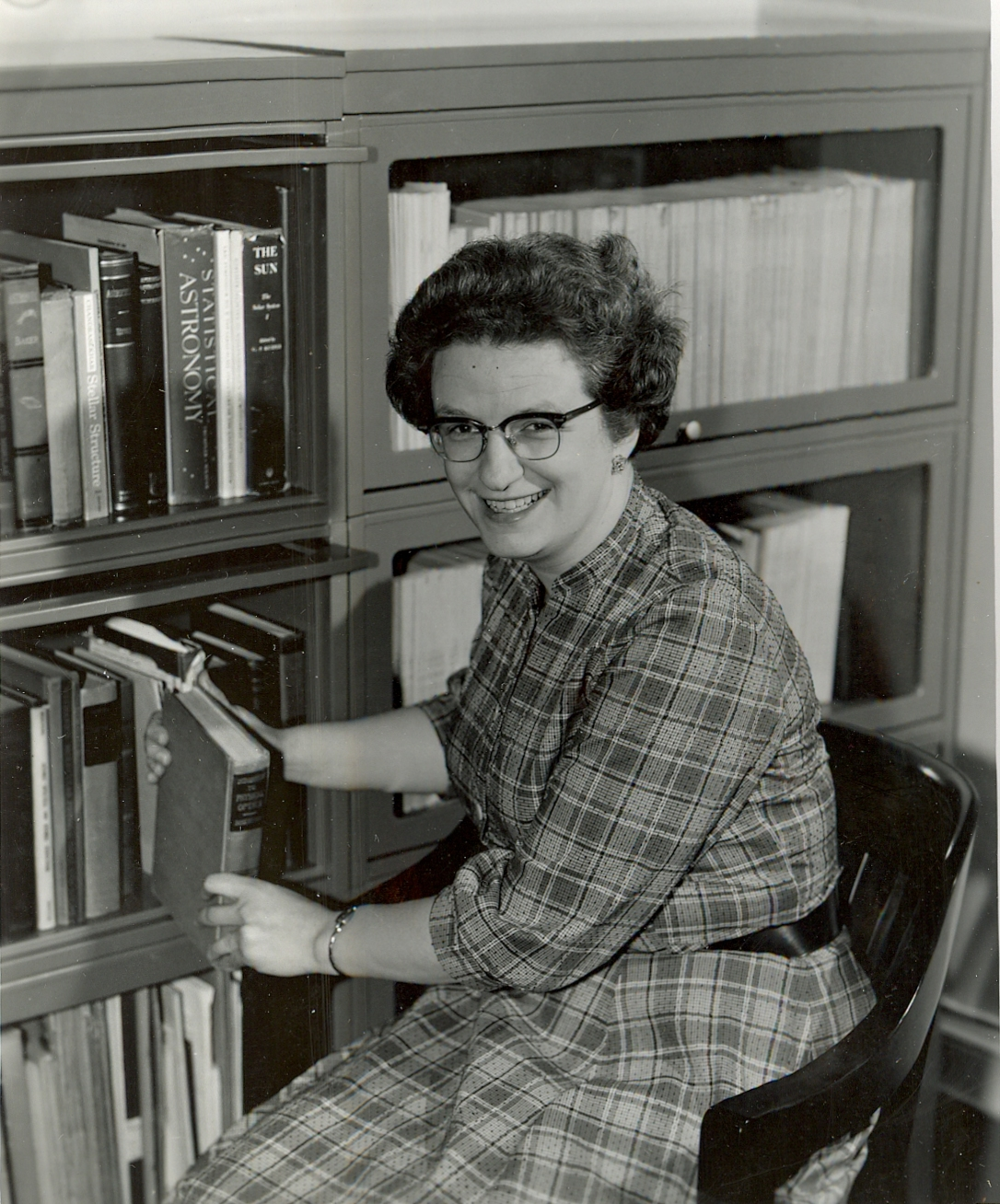
Nancy Grace Roman in her NASA office in the 1960s

At a lecture by Harold Urey at NASA, Roman was approached by Jack Clark, who asked whether she knew someone interested in creating a program for space astronomy at NASA. She interpreted that as an invitation to apply and was the applicant who accepted the position. While the position nominally allowed for 20% of her time to be used for scientific research, she recognized that such a position would effectively mean she was giving up research, but, as she said in 2018, "the chance to start with a clean slate to map out a program that I thought would influence astronomy for fifty years was more than I could resist."

Roman arrived at NASA in late February 1959 as Head of Observational Astronomy. She quickly inherited a broad program which included the Orbiting Solar Observatories and geodesy and relativity. In early 1960, Roman became the first astronomer in the position of Chief of Astronomy in NASA's Office of Space Science, setting up the initial program; she was also the first woman to hold an executive position at the space agency.

Part of her job was traveling throughout the country and giving lectures at astronomy departments, where she discussed the fact that the program was in development. Roman also was looking to find out what other astronomers wanted to study and to educate them on the advantages of observing from space. Her visits set the precedent that NASA scientific research would be driven by the needs of the broader astronomical community, or in her words, the visits were "to tell them what we were planning at NASA and what the NASA opportunities were, but it was equally to try to get from them a feeling of what they thought NASA ought to be doing."

Her work was instrumental in converting what was then a ground-based astronomical community, hostile to the space science program, into supporters of astronomy from space. She established the policy that major astronomy projects would be managed by NASA for the good of the broader scientific community, rather than as individual experiments run by academic research scientists. As early as 1960, a year into her new position, Roman began publishing plans for NASA astronomy with policy statements, such as "A fundamental part of all of these plans is the participation of the entire astronomical community. NASA will act as a coordinating agency to enable astronomers to obtain the basic observations they need from outer space."

During her employment at NASA, Roman developed and prepared the budgets for various programs and she organized their scientific participation. From 1959 through the 1970s, when the introduction of peer review brought in outside expertise, she was the sole individual accepting or rejecting proposals for NASA astronomy projects based on their merit and her own knowledge.

In 1959, Roman proposed, perhaps for the first time, that detecting planets around other stars might be possible using a space-based telescope, and even suggested a technique employing a rotated coronagraphic mask; a similar approach was ultimately used with the Hubble Space Telescope to image the possible exoplanet Fomalhaut B (ref K.) and will be used by the Nancy Grace Roman Space Telescope to image exoplanets similar to the giant planets in the Solar System. She also believed as early as 1980 that the future Hubble would be able to detect Jupiter exoplanets by astrometry; this was successful in 2002 when astronomers characterized a previously discovered planet around the star Gliese 876.

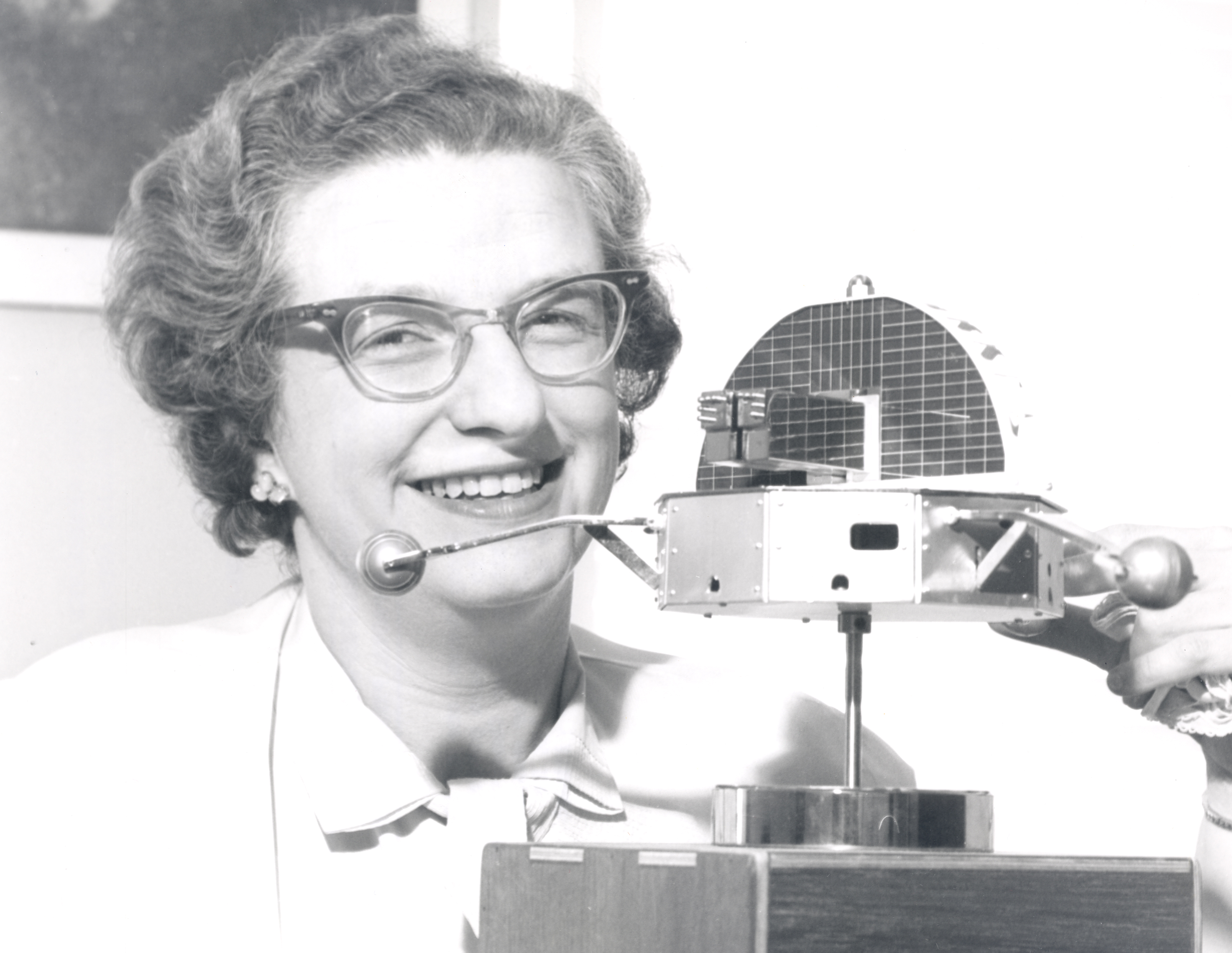
Roman with a model of the Orbiting Solar Observatory in 1962

Roman's position became Chief of Astronomy and Solar Physics at NASA from 1961 to 1963. During this time, she oversaw the development of the Orbiting Solar Observatory (OSO) program, developing and launching OSO 1 in May 1962 and developing OSO 2, (February 1965) and OSO 3 (March 1967). She held various other positions in NASA, including Chief of Astronomy and Relativity.

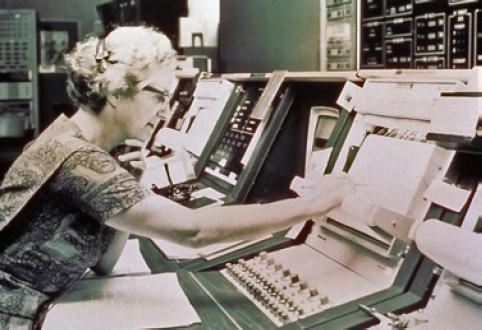
Roman sits at the control console for the Orbiting Astronomical Observatory satellite, launched in 1972 and nicknamed Copernicus. This is a publicity picture; she never actually worked in the Goddard control room.

She also led, from 1959, the orbiting astronomical observatories (OAO) program, initially a series of optical and ultraviolet telescopes, working with engineer Dixon Ashworth. The first, OAO-1, was slated to be launched in 1962, but technical difficulties resulted in a descoped version launched in 1966, but which failed three days after reaching orbit. Roman explained these problems by analogy in 2018:

If you contract to have a house built, you are not surprised if it is not finished by the predicted date even though house building is an established art. NASA was trying to learn a completely new process with unexpected problems arising all along. Thus, it is hardly surprising that there were unpredicted delays.

She continued to develop Orbiting Astronomical Observatory 2, launched in December 1968, which became the first successful space telescope. OAO-3, named Copernicus, was a highly successful ultraviolet telescope which operated from 1972 to 1981.

Roman oversaw the development and launch of the three small astronomical satellites: the X-ray explorer Uhuru (satellite) in 1970 with Riccardo Giacconi, the gamma-ray telescope Small Astronomy Satellite 2 in 1972, and the multi-instrument X-ray telescope Small Astronomy Satellite 3 in 1975. Other projects she oversaw included four geodetic satellites. She planned for other smaller programs such as the Astronomy Rocket Program, the Scout Probe to measure the relativistic gravity redshift, programs for high energy astronomy observatories, and other experiments on Spacelab, Gemini, Apollo, and Skylab.

Roman was known to be blunt in her dealings, or as Robert Zimmerman put it, "her hard-nosed and realistic manner of approving or denying research projects had made her disliked by many in the astronomical community". This was very much in evidence in the early 1960s when she terminated the relativity program, which at the time consisted of three separate projects, when the Pound-Rebka experiment achieved better accuracy than was projected for the space-based projects.

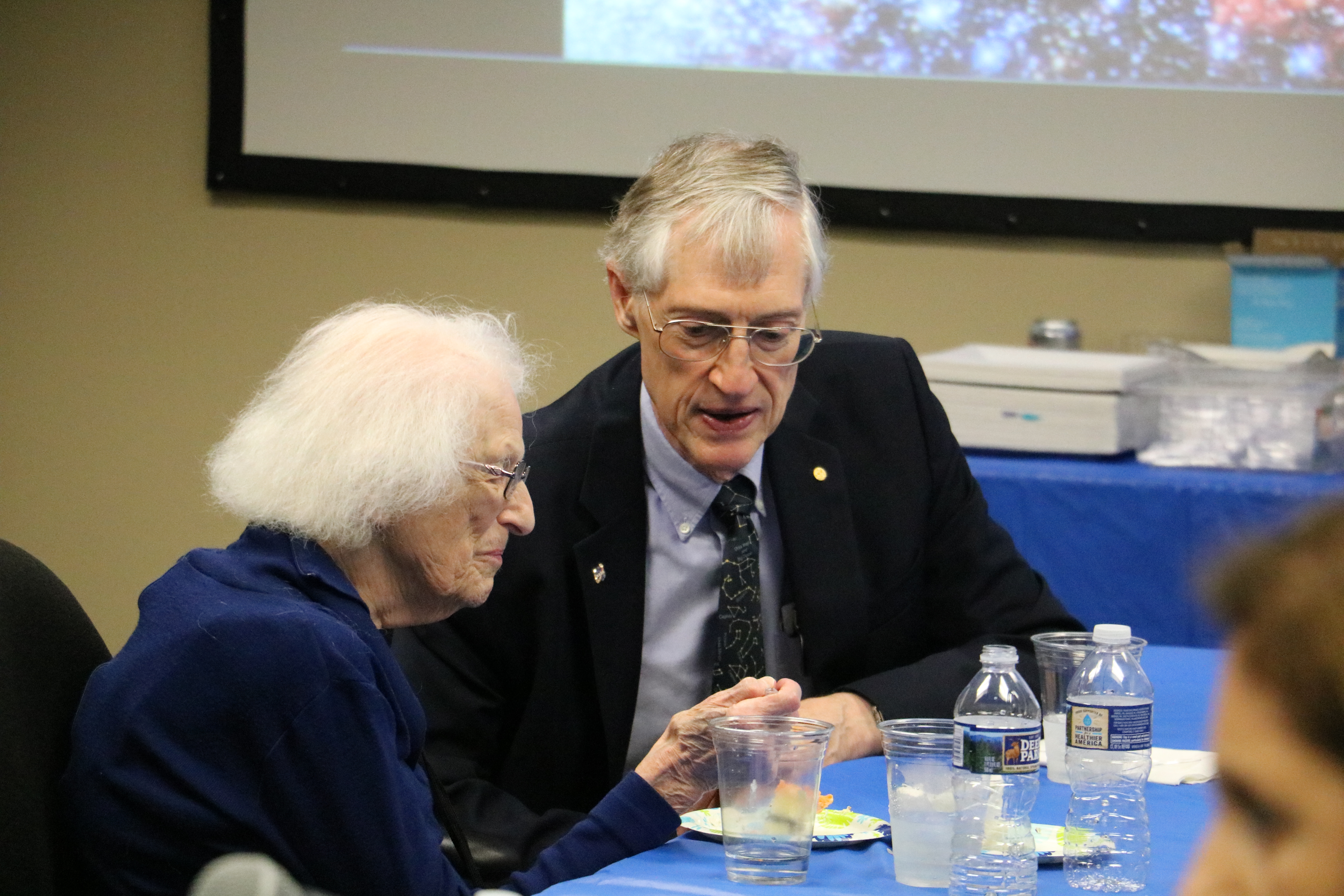
Nancy Grace Roman with COBE Project Scientist John Mather in 2017

Roman worked with Jack Holtz, on the small astronomy satellite and Don Burrowbridge on the space telescope. She set up NASA's scientific ballooning program, inheriting the Stratoscope balloon projects led by Martin Schwarzschild from the ONR and the National Science Foundation. Roman led the development of NASA's airborne astronomy program, beginning with a 12-inch (30 cm) telescope in a Learjet in 1968 and followed in 1974 by the Kuiper Airborne Observatory with a 36-inch (91 cm) telescope, opening up the obscured infrared region of the spectrum for astronomical observations to researchers such as Frank J. Low.

Other long wavelength missions started during her tenure were the Cosmic Background Explorer, which, although she was initially unconvinced would be able to pass review garnered the Nobel Prize in 2006 for two of its leading scientists, and the Infrared Astronomy Satellite, both of which were overseen by Nancy Boggess, who Roman had hired in 1968 to help manage the growing portfolio of astronomy missions. Roman was instrumental in NASA's acceptance of partnership in the International Ultraviolet Explorer, which she felt was her greatest success, saying, "IUE was an uphill fight. I don't mean I didn't have some support, but I think I carried it on almost single handedly."

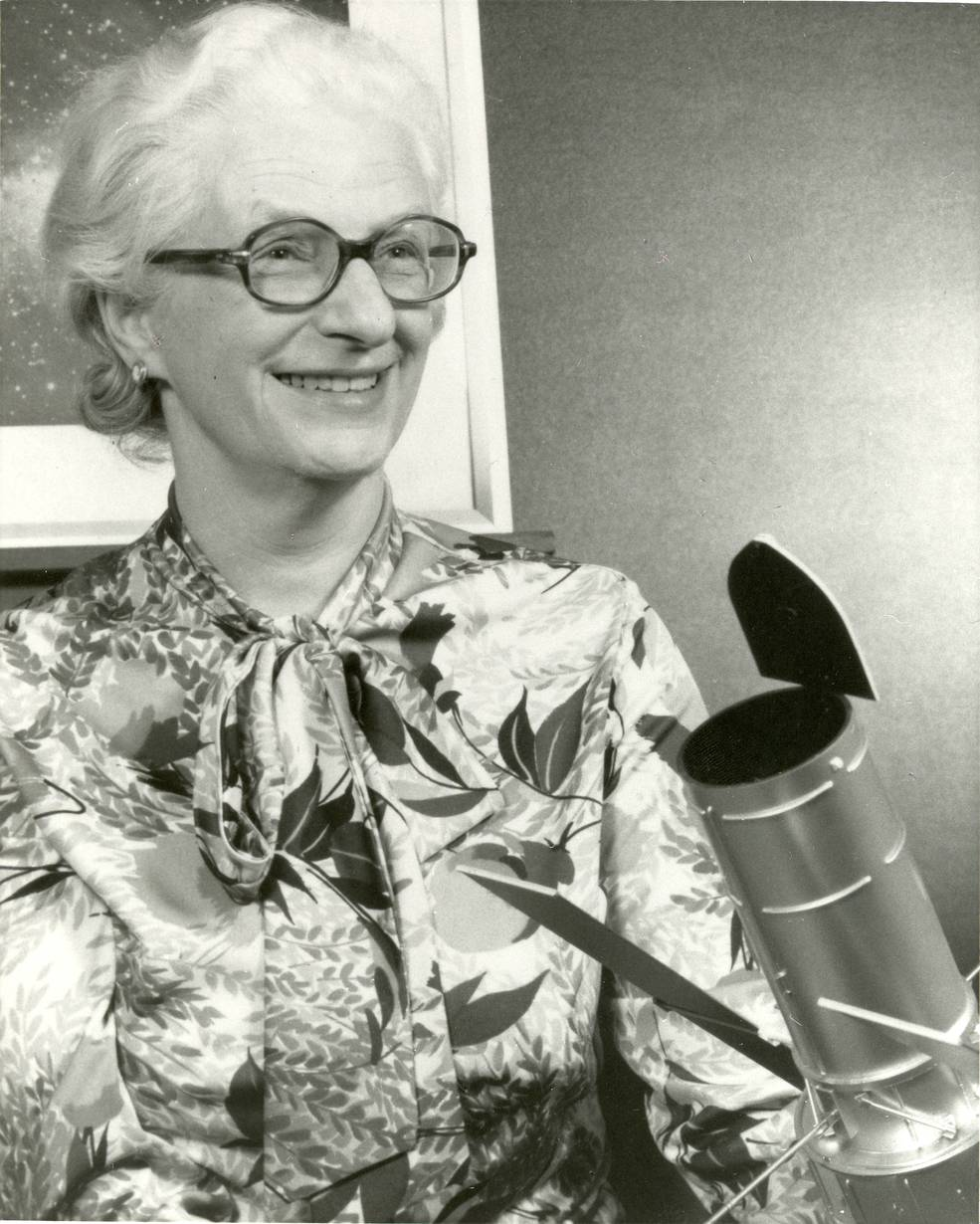
Dr. Nancy Grace Roman with a model of the Large Space Telescope that was eventually developed as the Hubble Space Telescope, ca. 1980.

The last program in which Roman was highly involved was the Hubble Space Telescope, then referred to as the Large Space Telescope (LST). While a large telescope in space had been proposed by Lyman Spitzer in 1946, and astronomers became interested in a 3m-class space telescope in the early 1960s as the Saturn V rocket was being developed, Roman chose to focus on developing smaller-scale OAO telescopes first in order to demonstrate the necessary technologies. She felt that even the modest 12-inch (30 cm) telescopes of OAO-2, which did not launch until 1968, were a major leap forward, not least because the development of suitable pointing control systems was a major technological hurdle. Astronomers promoted the idea of a telescope on the Moon, which Roman felt had too many insurmountable issues such as dust, and engineers at NASA's Langley Research Center promoted the idea in 1965 of a space telescope with human operators, which Roman considered an absurd complication.

After the success of OAO-2, Roman began to entertain beginning the Large Space Telescope, and started giving public lectures touting the scientific value of such a facility. NASA asked the National Academy of Sciences in 1969 to study the science of a 3m-class telescope in space, resulting in an endorsement for NASA to proceed. In 1971 Roman set up the Science Steering Group for the Large Space Telescope, and appointed both NASA engineers and astronomers from all over the country to serve on it, for the express purpose of designing a free-floating space observatory that could meet the community's needs but would be feasible for NASA to implement.

Roman was very involved with the early planning and specifically, the setting up of the program structure. According to Robert Zimmerman, "Roman had been the driving force for an LST from its earliest days" and that she, along with astronomer Charles Robert O'Dell, hired in 1972 to be the Project Scientist under Roman as the Program Scientist, "were the primary advocates and overseers of the LST within NASA, and their efforts working with the astronomical community produced a detailed paradigm for NASA operation of a large scientific project that now serves as a standard for large astronomical facilities."

This included creating and devolving responsibility for mission science operations to the Space Telescope Science Institute. With both the astronomical community and the NASA hierarchy convinced of the feasibility and value of the LST, Roman then spoke to politically connected men in a series of dinners hosted by NASA Administrator James Webb in order to build support for the LST project, and then wrote testimony for Congress throughout the 1970s to continue to justify the telescope. She invested in detector technology, resulting in the Hubble being the first major observatory to use charge-coupled device detectors, although these had been flown in space in 1976 in the KH-11 Kennen reconnaissance satellites. Roman's final role in the development of Hubble was to serve on the selection board for its science operations.

Because of her contribution, she often is called the "Mother of Hubble". Later in life she started being uncomfortable with that appellation given the many contributions made by others. NASA's then-Chief Astronomer, Edward J. Weiler, who worked with Roman at the agency, called her 'the mother of the Hubble Space Telescope'. He said, "which is often forgotten by our younger generation of astronomers who make their careers by using Hubble Space Telescope". Weiler added, "Regretfully, history has forgotten a lot in today's Internet age, but it was Nancy in the old days before the Internet and before Google and e-mail and all that stuff, who really helped to sell the Hubble Space Telescope, organize the astronomers, who eventually convinced Congress to fund it." Williams recalls Roman as someone "whose vision in a NASA leadership position shaped U.S. space astronomy for decades".

=== Post-NASA ===
After working for NASA for twenty-one years, she took an early retirement opportunity in 1979 in part to allow her to care for her elderly mother. She continued on as a consultant for another year in order to complete the selection of STScI. Roman was interested in learning computer programming, and so audited a course on FORTRAN at Montgomery College that garnered her a job as a consultant for ORI, Inc. from 1980 to 1988. In that role, she was able to support research in geodesy and the development of astronomical catalogs, two of her former research areas. This led to her becoming the head of the Astronomical Data Center at NASA's Goddard Space Flight Center in 1995.

She continued her work until 1997 for contractors who supported the Goddard Space Flight Center. Roman then spent three years teaching advanced junior high and high school students and K-12 science teachers, including those in underserved districts. She then spent ten years recording astronomical textbooks for Reading for the Blind and Dyslexic. In a 2017 interview, Roman said: "I like to talk to children about the advantages of going into science and particularly to tell the girls, by showing them my life, that they can be scientists and succeed."

From 1955 on, she lived in the Washington, D.C. area, in the later years in Chevy Chase, Maryland with her mother, who died in 1992. Roman was a lifelong Unitarian Universalist and an active member of the River Road Unitarian Universalist Congregation in Bethesda, Maryland. Outside her work, Roman enjoyed going to lectures and concerts and was active in the American Association of University Women. She died on December 25, 2018, following a long illness.

=== Women in science ===
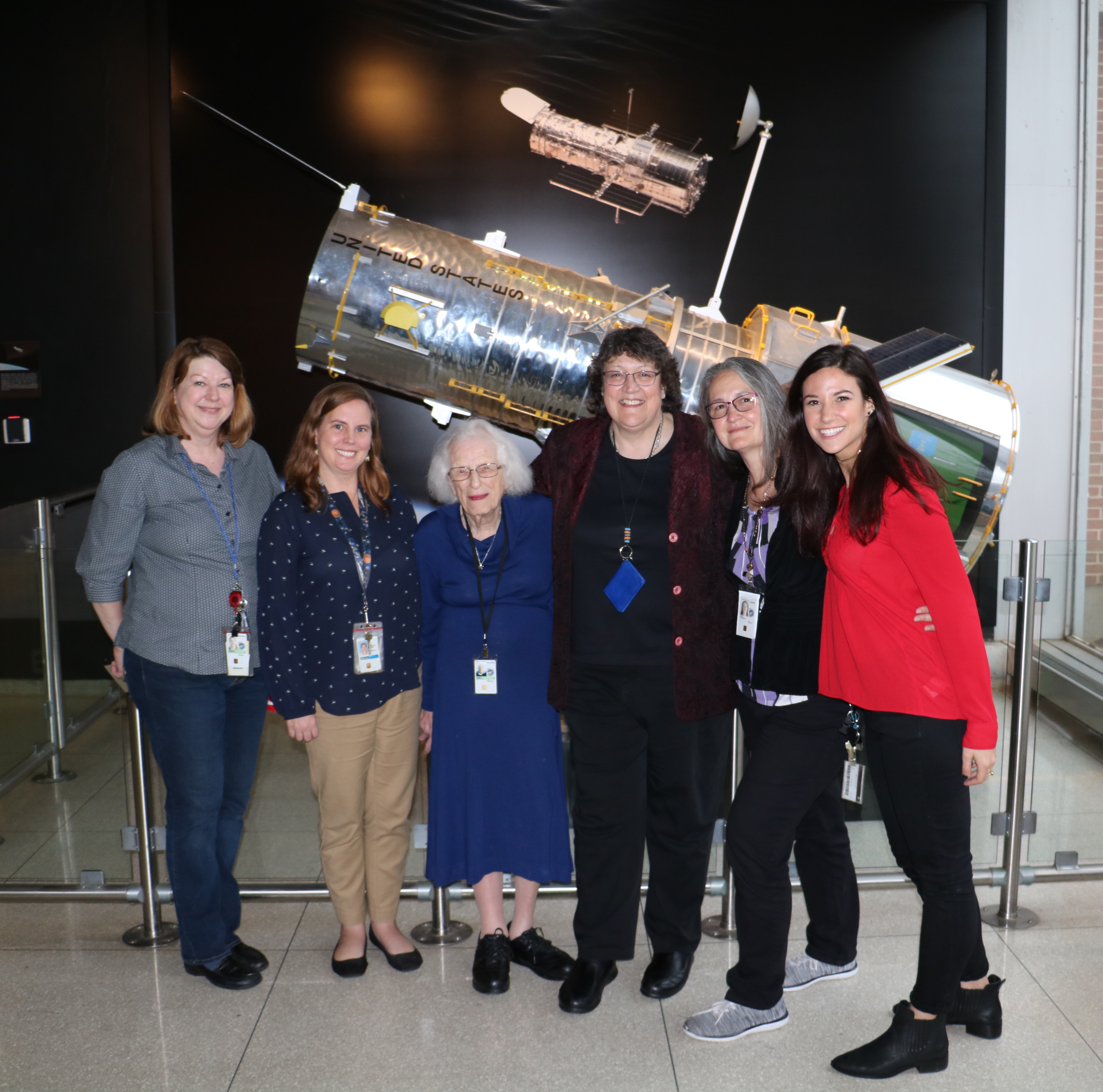
Nancy Grace Roman with Women of Hubble

Like most women in the sciences in the mid-20th century, Roman was faced with problems related to male domination in science and technology and the roles perceived as appropriate for women in that time period. She was discouraged from going into science by people around her, but ignored them and continued her scientific studies and career. In an interview with Voice of America, Roman remembered asking her high school guidance counselor if she could take second year algebra instead of Latin. "She looked down her nose at me and sneered, 'What kind of lady would take mathematics instead of Latin?' That was the sort of reception I got most of the way", recalled Roman.

At one time, she was one of very few women in NASA, being the only woman with an executive position. She attended courses entitled, "Women in Management", in Michigan and at Penn State to learn about issues regarding being a woman in a management position. Roman stated in an interview in 1980 that the courses were dissatisfying and addressed women's interests rather than women's problems.

In 1963, when entry to the astronaut corps was restricted to men, Roman said in a speech that "I believe that there will be women astronauts some time, just as there are women airplane pilots". In her position she did not effect change to this, something she admitted to regretting.

In recognition of her advancement of women in senior science management, Roman received recognitions from several women's organizations, including the Women's Education and Industrial Union, the Ladies' Home Journal magazine, Women in Aerospace, the Women's History Museum, and the American Association of University Women. She was also one of four women featured in 2017 in the "Women of NASA LEGO Set", which of all her honors she described as "by far the most fun."

== Selected publications ==
Roman published 97 scientific papers during her lifetime.

- Roman, Nancy (January 1948). "The Classification of the Metallic-Line Stars". The Astrophysical Journal. 107: 107–109. Bibcode:1948ApJ...107..107R. doi:10.1086/144995.
- Roman, Nancy (September 1949). "The Ursa Major Group". Astrophysical Journal. 110: 205. Bibcode:1949ApJ...110..205R. doi:10.1086/145199.
- Roman, Nancy Grace; Morgan, William (March 1950). "The Moving Cluster in Perseus". Astrophysical Journal. 111: 426. Bibcode:1950ApJ...111..426R. doi:10.1086/145276.
- Roman, Nancy (November 1950). "A Correlation Between the Spectroscopic and Dynamical Characteristics of the Late F – and Early G – Type Stars". Astrophysical Journal. 112: 554. Bibcode:1950ApJ...112..554R. doi:10.1086/145367.
- Morgan, William; Roman, Nancy Grace (November 1950). "Revised Standards for Supergiants on the System of the Yerkes Spectral Atlas". Astrophysical Journal. 112: 362–364. Bibcode:1950ApJ...112..362M. doi:10.1086/145351.
- Roman, Nancy (November 1951). "A Study of the Concentration of Early-Type Stars in Cygnus". Astrophysical Journal. 114: 492. Bibcode:1951ApJ...114..492R. doi:10.1086/145492.
- Roman, Nancy (July 1952). "The Spectra of the Bright Stars of Types F5-K5". Astrophysical Journal. 116: 122. Bibcode:1952ApJ...116..122R. doi:10.1086/145598.
- Roman, Nancy (July 1953). "The Spectrum Of BD+67°922* (AG Draconis)". Astrophysical Journal. 117: 467. Bibcode:1953ApJ...117..467R. doi:10.1086/145717.
- Roman, Nancy (September 1954). "A group of high velocity F-type stars". Astronomical Journal. 59: 307–312. Bibcode:1954AJ.....59..307R. doi:10.1086/107017.
- Roman, Nancy (December 1955). "A Catalogue of High-Velocity Stars". Astrophysical Journal Supplement. 2: 195. Bibcode:1955ApJS....2..195R. doi:10.1086/190021.
- Roman, Nancy (March 1956). "Spectral Types of Some Eclipsing Binaries". Astrophysical Journal. 123: 246. Bibcode:1956ApJ...123..246R. doi:10.1086/146155.
- Roman, Nancy (October 1959). "Planets of other suns". Astronomical Journal. 64: 344–345. Bibcode:1959AJ.....64R.344R. doi:10.1086/108038.

== Recognition ==
- Federal Woman's Award – 1962
- One of 100 Most Important Young People, Life magazine – 1962
- Citation for Public Service, Colorado Women's College – 1966
- Ninetieth Anniversary Award, Women's Education and Industrial Union (Boston) – 1967
- Exceptional Scientific Achievement Medal NASA – 1969
- NASA Outstanding Scientific Leadership Award – 1978
- Fellow, American Astronautical Society – 1978
- William Randolph Lovelace II Award, American Astronautical Association – 1979 & 2011
- Fellow of the American Association for the Advancement of Science– 1988
- Lifetime Achievement Award – Women in Aerospace – 2010
- Woman of Distinction from American Association of University Women, Maryland – 2016
- Honorary Doctorates from Russell Sage College (1966), Hood College (1969), Bates College (1971) and Swarthmore College (1976)
- The asteroid 2516 Roman is named in her honor
- NASA fellowship program, The Nancy Grace Roman Technology Fellowship in Astrophysics, is named for her
- In 2017, a "Women of NASA" LEGO set went on sale featuring (among other things) mini-figurines of Roman, Margaret Hamilton, Mae Jemison, and Sally Ride
- Episode 113 of the "Hubblecast" podcast "Nancy Roman – The Mother of Hubble" was created in her honor, a video presentation that documents her career and explores her contribution to science
- In 2020, NASA named the Nancy Grace Roman Space Telescope, formerly the Wide Field Infrared Survey Telescope, in her honor. The telescope launched on 30 August 2026.
