= Z Andromedae =

Variable star in the constellation Andromeda

Observation data Epoch J2000 Equinox ICRS
- Constellation: Andromeda
- Right ascension: 23^{h} 33^{m} 39.95532^{s}
- Declination: +48° 49′ 05.9749″
- Apparent magnitude (V): 7.7 - 11.3

Characteristics
- Spectral type: M2III + B1eq
- U−B color index: −0.49
- B−V color index: +1.35
- Variable type: Z And

Astrometry
Radial velocity (R_{v})	−0.59 km/s
Proper motion (μ)	RA: −1.729±0.018 mas/yr Dec.: −3.0410±018 mas/yr
Parallax (π)	0.4866±0.0220 mas
Distance	6,700 ± 300 ly (2,060 ± 90 pc)

Orbit
Period (P)	759.0±1.9 days
Eccentricity (e)	0.0
Inclination (i)	47±12°
Semi-amplitude (K_{1}) (primary)	6.73±0.22 km/s

Details

Red giant
Mass	2 M_{☉}
Radius	85 R_{☉}
Luminosity	880 L_{☉}
Temperature	3,400 K

White dwarf
Mass	0.75 M_{☉}
Radius	0.17 - 0.36 R_{☉}
Luminosity	1,500 - 9,800 L_{☉}
Temperature	90,000 - 150,000 K
Rotation	1682.6 ± 0.6 s

Other designations
- MWC 416, HD 221650, HIP 116287, SAO 53146, PPM 64386, AG+48°2087, GCRV 14773, IRAS 23312+4832, HV 193, AN 41.1901, JP11 3636, TYC 3645-2066-1, BD+48°4093, GSC 03645-02066, 2MASS J23333994+4849059, AAVSO 2328+48, 2E 2331.6+4834, PLX 5697, 2E 4735

Database references
SIMBAD	data

Data sources:

Hipparcos Catalogue, CCDM (2002), Bright Star Catalogue (5th rev. ed.)

Z Andromedae is a binary star system consisting of a red giant and a white dwarf. It is the prototype of a type of cataclysmic variable star known as symbiotic variable stars or simply Z Andromedae variables. The brightness of those stars vary over time, showing a quiescent, more stable phase and then an active one with a more pronounced variability and stronger brightening and/or dimming.

== Binary system ==
Z Andromedae is a binary star system. The two components have a circular orbit that takes 759 days to complete. The red giant is around twice the mass of the sun and 880 times its luminosity, but its effective temperature is only 2,800 K. The white dwarf is around a thousand times the luminosity of the sun during the quiescent phase, but up to 10 times more luminous during the active phases. Its temperature is as high as 150,000 K when quiescent, but drops below 100,000 K when active. It also spins around its rotation axis every 1,682 seconds and displays a strong magnetic field.

The evolved red giant star is losing mass, since radiation pressure overcomes the low gravity on the surface. The outflow of matter is captured by the gravitational field of the white dwarf and falls on its surface in the end. At least during the active phase an accretion disk forms around the white dwarf.

== Variability ==
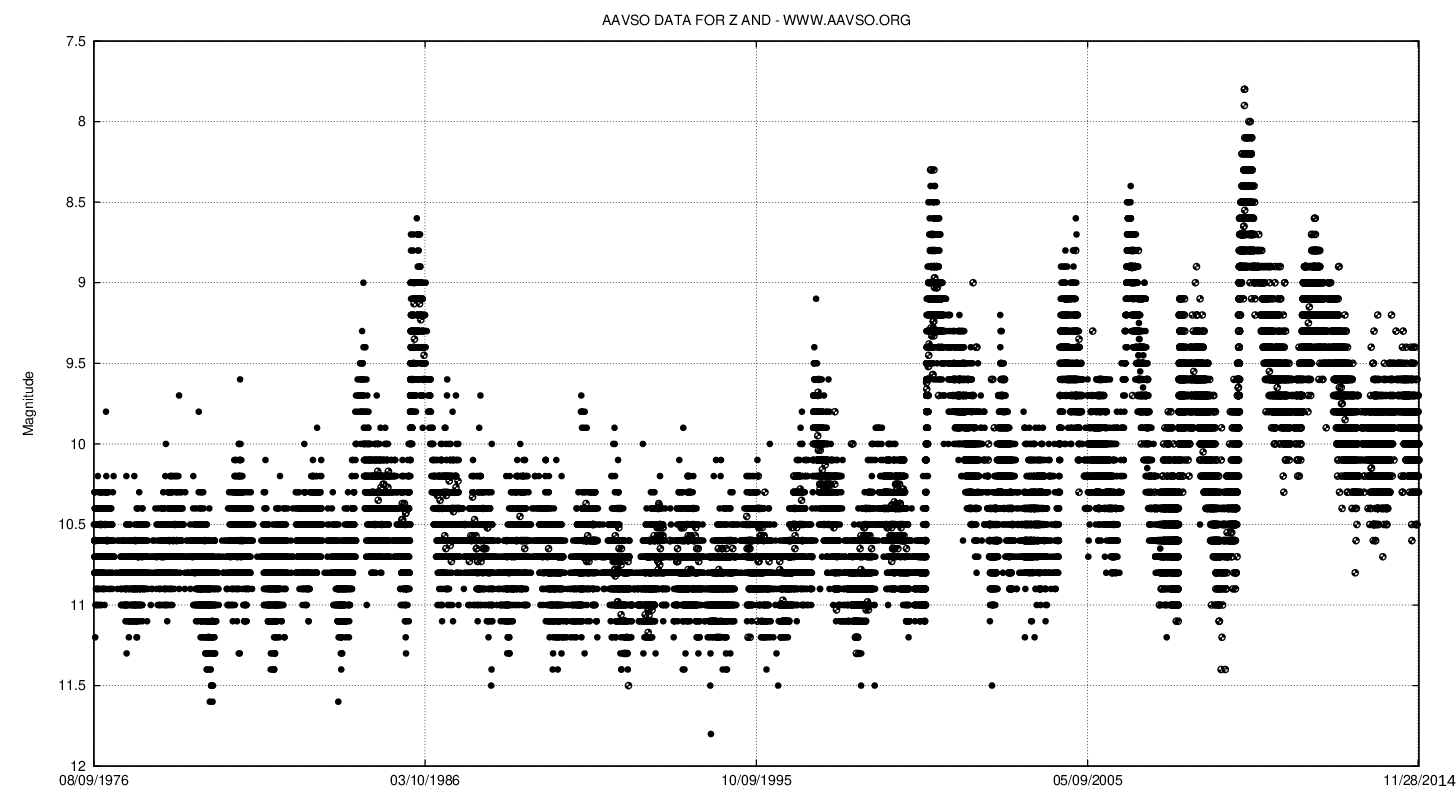
Light curve of Z Andromedae, showing a typical outburst in 1986 and the abnormally long active period from 2000 onwards

The variability of Z Andromedae was discovered by Williamina Paton Stevens Fleming, and announced in 1901.

During the quiescent phase, most of the white dwarf luminosity comes from stable hydrogen burning on its surface, and photons emitted this way ionize the wind of the red giant which causes nebular emission. The giant star, however, follows a quasi-periodic activity cycle (similar to the solar cycle) roughly every 7,550 days; when the activity of the star is enhanced, the stellar wind becomes stronger, and in response the white dwarf increases in size and cools, triggering the active phase.

In the quiescent phase, the brightness of Z Andromedae is modulated by the orbital period of the system, and can reach a magnitude of m_{v} = 11.3 at minimum. During the active phase Z Andromedae makes luminosity outbursts and can increase its brightness up to a magnitude of m_{v} = 7.7. Eclipses from the red giant are still visible in this phase. During this phase, a shorter periodicity of 685 days is observed; this could be a beat period between the unknown rotation period of the giant star and the orbital period, which arise from the non-spherical outflow of matter from the atmosphere of the giant star.

Z Andromedae started an unusually long active phase in September 2000, brightening by several magnitudes multiple times over at least a decade. During the outbursts, irregular brightness variations (up to 0.065 magnitudes) were observed at timescales shorter than a day, interpreted as warping in the accretion disk. If models for this source are correct, it should enter a quiescent phase again in 2020.

== Spectrum ==
=== Optical ===
The spectrum of Z Andromedae has been recognised as extremely peculiar since the early 20th century. Early spectra during a bright period, showing only emission lines against a red continuum, were interpreted as a star embedded in dense nebulosity. As the star's brightness faded, the spectrum lost the high excitation "nebular" lines and developed absorption lines with P Cygni profiles. These spectra were readily identified as being due to a hot nova-like star with a cool companion. Emission lines identified included low ionization states of hydrogen and helium with high ionization states of oxygen and iron.

The MK spectral classification is typical of a cool giant, for example M4.5. The exact spectral type has been shown to vary, for example between M5 in 1987 and M3.5 in 1989. Infrared observations gave a combination spectral type of M2III + B1eq. Here the luminosity class of III is for a normal giant star, and the peculiarity codes eq indicate emission lines with P Cygni profiles.

=== Ultraviolet ===
Z Andromedae shows also a strong ultraviolet emission, which follows the optical behaviour; absorption lines identified during the quiescent phase becomes emission lines during outbursts. Elements identified in this region of the spectrum are carbon, nitrogen, phosphorus and silicon in their ionized states.

=== Radio ===
The radio flux from Z Andromedae at the beginning of outbursts is lower than the usual quiescent level, and has a maximum after the optical one. After the outbursts, radio jets can be seen flowing out of this system, in a direction perpendicular to the orbital plane.

=== X-ray ===
Z Andromedae is much fainter in X-ray, and has not been detected when in the quiescent phase. During outbursts, X-ray emission comes from shock-heated plasma, where the kinetic energy of the outflowing material is converted in X-ray radiation. This emission "mimics" a blackbody radiation with a temperature different from that of the white dwarf, but its real nature can be identified because it shows absorption edges (which shows also the presence of neon) and an excess at high frequencies.

== Bipolar jets ==
Following the 2006 outburst, the hydrogen Balmer emission lines included faint wings at a velocity of ±1,150 km/s. Since extended radio outflows had previously been seen during the long 2000-2002 outbursts, collimated jets along the axis of the system were the most likely explanation for this phenomenon. It is thought that the jets are only present during bright outbursts. The jets were observed again during subsequent outbursts; their velocity is highly variable at the beginning but settles on a constant velocity after roughly 1 month. A single jet can also occur. The jets could be formed by material that cannot accrete on the white dwarf that reaches the Eddington limit.
