= Ellmann =

Ellmann is a surname. Notable people with the name include:

- Lucy Ellmann (born 1956), Anglo-American novelist
- Marvin Ellmann (born 1987), German footballer
- Mary Ellmann (1921–1989), American writer and literary critic
- Richard Ellmann (1918–1987), American literary critic and biographer
- Kevin Ellmann (born 1972), Prominent Colorado attorney named to Best Lawyers in America, SuperLawyers and AVVO 10.0. He is also a Municipal Court Judge.

== See also ==
- Elman (name, surname), Ellman, Ellmann, Ellemann, Ellerman, Ellermann
