= Ellemann =

Ellemann is a surname. Notable people with the surname include:

- Karen Ellemann (born 1969), Danish politician, former Minister for Equality and Minister for Nordic Cooperation.
- Jakob Ellemann-Jensen (born 1973), Danish politician and chairman of the Venstre party
- Uffe Ellemann-Jensen (1941–2022), Danish politician, Foreign ministers of Denmark 1982–1993 and President of the European Liberals 1995–2000

== See also ==
- Elman (name, surname), Ellman, Ellmann, Ellemann, Ellerman, Ellermann
