= AG Draconis =

Star in the constellation Draco

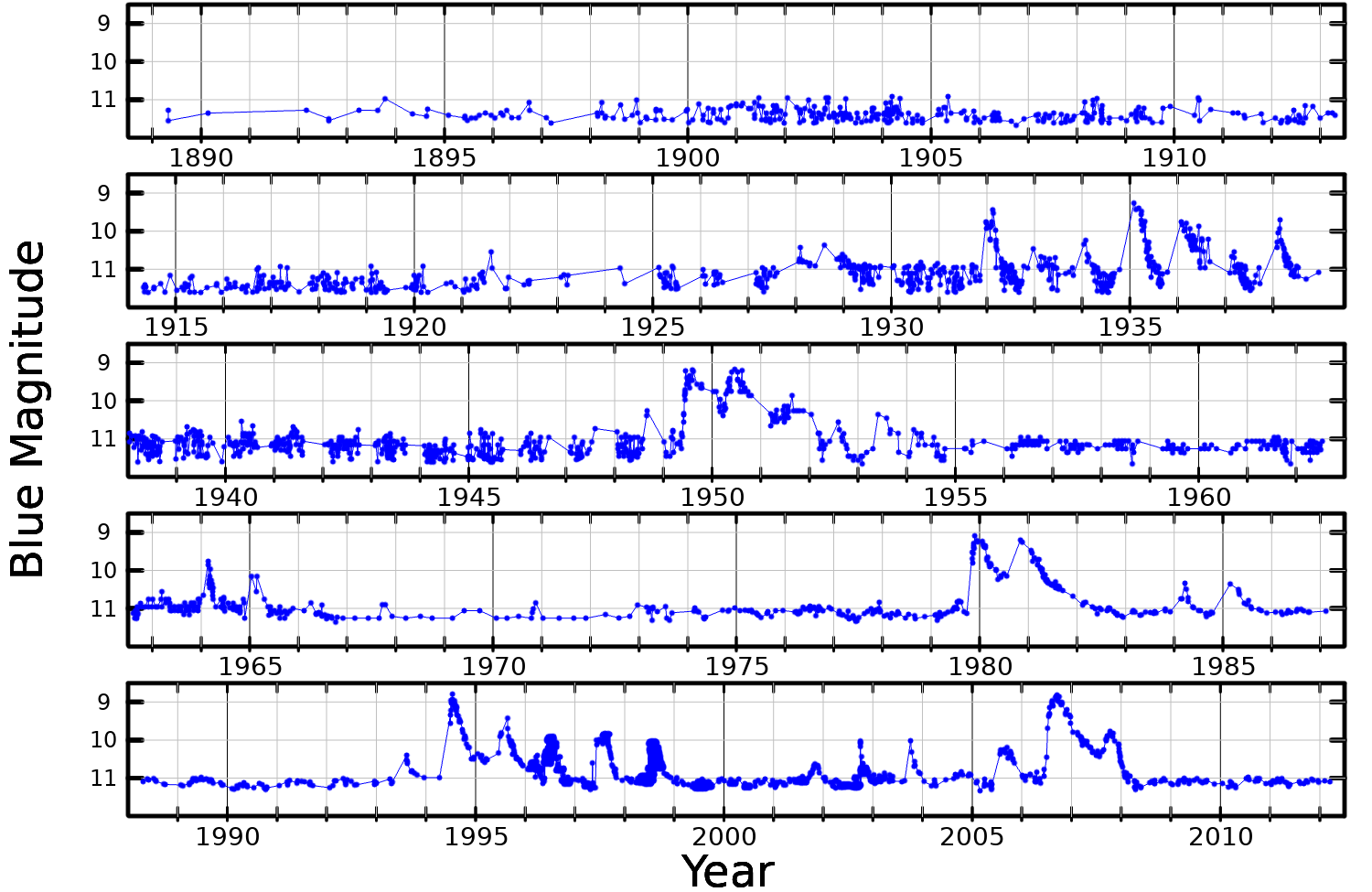
- A blue band light curve for AG Draconis, spanning 123 years, adapted from Gális et al. (2015)

Observation data Epoch J2000 Equinox ICRS
- Constellation: Draco
- Right ascension: 16^{h} 01^{m} 41.01257^{s}
- Declination: +66° 48′ 10.1312″
- Apparent magnitude (V): 7.9 - 10.3

Characteristics
- Spectral type: K3 IIIep + WD
- B−V color index: 1.425±0.094
- Variable type: Z And

Astrometry
Radial velocity (R_{v})	−147.42±0.30 km/s
Proper motion (μ)	RA: −7.135 mas/yr Dec.: −5.602 mas/yr
Parallax (π)	0.2101±0.0268 mas
Distance	approx. 16,000 ly (approx. 4,800 pc)

Orbit
Period (P)	549.73 d
Eccentricity (e)	0.06
Periastron epoch (T)	2447622.28 JD
Argument of periastron (ω) (secondary)	359.8°
Semi-amplitude (K_{1}) (primary)	4.67 km/s

Details

AG Dra A
Mass	1.5 M_{☉}
Radius	35 R_{☉}
Metallicity [Fe/H]	−1.3 dex

AG Dra B
Luminosity	~ 10^{3} L_{☉}
Temperature	~ 10^{5} K

Other designations
- AG Dra, AAVSO 1601+67, AG+66° 715, BD+67°922, HIP 78512, SAO 16931

Database references
SIMBAD	data

AG Draconis is a binary star system in the northern constellation of Draco. It consists of a giant star and a white dwarf that revolve around each other every 550 days.

== Discovery ==
AG Draconis has been catalogued since mid 20th century, as BD+67°922. However, its unusual nature did not start to come to light until the middle of the century. It was noted as an emission-line object in 1943, although its nature was not understood. The emission spectrum was serendipitously discovered to be variable by Nancy Grace Roman when she observed the star and found that the spectrum had completely changed since earlier observations. It was given the variable star designation AG Draconis in 1964.

== Variability ==
AG Draconis spends most of its time in a quiescent phase near visual magnitude 9.8, with only small semi-regular variations thought to be due to pulsations of the giant star. At its faintest, it can reach magnitude 10.3. The semi-regular variations have periods of 340 – 370 days. Variations at ultraviolet wavelengths occur with a period of 550 days, which is the orbital period.

Every 12–16 years, outbursts occur and last for several years. The brightness can increase to visual magnitude 7.9, although usually not this bright.

== System ==
The a sin i value for the primary is 50.69 R_{☉}, where a is the semimajor axis and i is the (unknown) orbital inclination. The larger star is thought to be an orange hued giant around 1.5 times as massive as the Sun that has swollen to around 35 times the diameter of the Sun with a spectral type measured at K3IIIep. The smaller star is a compact hot white dwarf around 0.4 times as massive as the Sun, with a surface temperature of around 80,000 K.
