= Symbiotic binary =

Class of astronomical objects

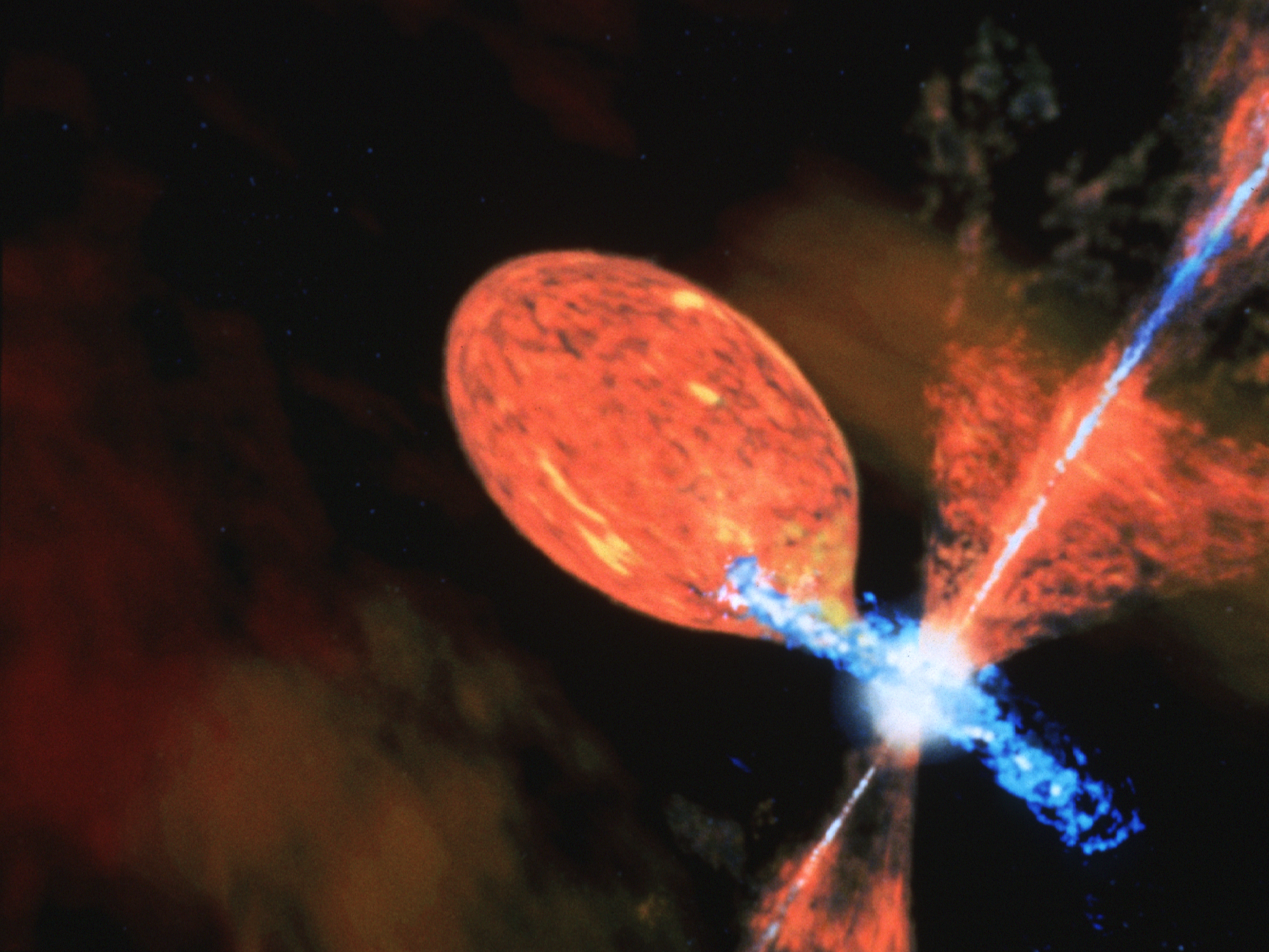
Artist's impression of R Aquarii, a symbiotic binary, during an active phase

A symbiotic binary is a type of binary star system, often simply called a symbiotic star. They usually contain a white dwarf with a companion red giant. The cool giant star loses material via Roche lobe overflow or through its stellar wind, which flows onto the hot compact star, usually via an accretion disk.

Symbiotic binaries are of particular interest to astronomers as they can be used to learn about stellar evolution. They are also vital in the study of stellar wind, ionized nebulae, and accretion because of the unique interstellar dynamics present within the system.

== Variability ==
Many symbiotic binaries show brightness changes and are classified as variable stars. The star Z Andromedae is often considered the prototype of the symbiotic binary class of stars. More commonly it is considered as the prototype of only a subset of symbiotic stars with irregular variations up to about 4 magnitudes in amplitude. Even the Z Andromedae variable stars are thought to be an inhomogeneous group. The so-called symbiotic novae are a closely related class of symbiotic binaries, more formally known as type NC novae. They appear similar to classical novae but have extremely slow outbursts that can remain near maximum brightness for years.

The typical behavior of symbiotic binaries can be divided into two phases, based on the rate of accretion to the compact component. The two phases have very different luminosities, but the systems are often also variable in each phase.

=== Quiescent phase ===
When the accretion, mass-loss and ionization processes are all in equilibrium between the stars, the system is said to be in quiescence. At this point, the system will continue to release energy at an approximately average rate. This can be observed through the spectral energy distribution (SED) of the star which will remain relatively constant.

=== Active phase ===
If the equilibrium of a quiescent symbiotic star is disturbed, it will transition into an active phase. This phase is shown through a large change in both the nature of the radiation from the star, and a brightening of the optical emission of the star by several magnitudes. The transitions between phases are poorly understood, and it is currently difficult to predict when a star will transition into an active phase from quiescence, or when it will return to quiescence. Many systems have not yet been observed to enter an active state. Others, however, such as AG Draconis enter active phases on a regular and cyclical basis.

== Nomenclature ==
The term 'symbiotic star' was first used in 1958 in a publication about 'stars of composite spectra'. However, the distinct category of symbiotic stars had been previously known. They were first recognized as a class of stars with unique spectroscopic qualities by Annie Cannon near the beginning of the 20th century. Their binary nature was made clear by the simultaneous existence of the spectral lines indicative of a red giant and of a white dwarf or neutron star.

Symbiotic stars are all binaries and so the term symbiotic binary is synonymous. Many are variable and the term symbiotic variable or symbiotic variable star is sometimes also used synonymously, but more commonly is used only for Z Andromedae variable stars.

=== Sub-types ===
Symbiotic binaries are often divided into two sub-types based on the nature of the continuum in their spectra. S-type systems have a stellar continuum since the giant component is not obscured. D-type systems are surrounded by optically thick dusty nebulosity and the star itself is not directly visible. D-type systems tend to contain a Mira variable or other long period variable star.

== Jets ==
Some symbiotic stars have jets which are a collimated outflow of material. These typically are bi-polar and extend from both poles of the white dwarf. Jets are most commonly observed on stars which are currently in active phase or outburst. Once the outburst has ended, the jet fades and the ejected emissions dissipate. It has been argued that the jets present in symbiotic stars could help further the understanding of jets in other systems, such as in active galactic nuclei.
