= Elman (name) =

Elman is a given name. Notable people with the name include:

- Elman Guttormson (1929–2001), Canadian politician
- Elman Mammadov (born 1950), Azerbaijani politician
- Elman Rustamov (born 1952), Azerbaijani politician
- Elman Service (1915–1996), American cultural anthropologist
- Elman Sultanov (born 1974), Azerbaijani footballer
- Elman Tagaýew (born 1989), Turkmenistan footballer

== See also ==
Elman (name, surname), Ellman, Ellmann, Ellemann, Ellerman, Ellermann
