= R Aquarii =

Star in the constellation of Aquarius

- Location of R Aquarii (circled in red)

Observation data Epoch J2000 Equinox ICRS
- Constellation: Aquarius
- Right ascension: 23^{h} 43^{m} 49.46343^{s}
- Declination: −15° 17′ 04.1763″
- Apparent magnitude (V): 5.2–12.4

Characteristics
- Spectral type: M5e–M8.5e + pec
- U−B color index: −0.62
- B−V color index: +1.98
- Variable type: Mira + Z And

Astrometry
Radial velocity (R_{v})	−22.0 km/s
Proper motion (μ)	RA: +40.587 mas/yr Dec.: −30.411 mas/yr
Parallax (π)	4.59±0.24 mas
Distance	848 ± 88 ly (260±27 pc)

Orbit
Period (P)	39.585±0.257 yr
Semi-major axis (a)	0.0541±0.0010″
Eccentricity (e)	0.4616±0.0053
Inclination (i)	112.91±0.20°
Longitude of the node (Ω)	93.07±0.20°
Periastron epoch (T)	2020.300±0.020
Argument of periastron (ω) (secondary)	277.98±0.40°

Details

A
Mass	1.0 M_{☉}
Radius	430 R_{☉}
Luminosity	4,780 L_{☉}
Surface gravity (log g)	−0.5 cgs
Temperature	2,800 K

B
Mass	0.75 M_{☉}
Radius	>0.1 R_{☉}
Luminosity	5–20 L_{☉}
Temperature	60,000 K

Other designations
- R Aqr, BD−16°6352, HD 222800, HIP 117054, HR 8992, SAO 165849

Database references
SIMBAD	data

R Aquarii (R Aqr) is a variable star in the constellation Aquarius.

R Aquarii is a symbiotic star containing a red giant primary and a white dwarf secondary in a binary system. The orbital period is approximately 40 years. The main star is a Mira variable, and varies in brightness by a factor of several hundred and with a period of slightly more than a year; this variability was discovered by Karl Ludwig Harding in 1810. The total range of 5.2–12.4 is a variation of 750 times in brightness, from a naked eye star to one beyond the range of binoculars. The pulsations occur every 390 days but are not entirely regular. It is one of the nearest symbiotic stars and a well-known jet source. The two components have been resolved at a separation of 55 mas.

By its gravitational pull, the white dwarf draws in material from the red giant and occasionally ejects some of the surplus in loops to form the nebula seen in the linked image. The whole system appears reddened because it is situated in a very dusty region of space, and its blue light is absorbed before reaching Earth.

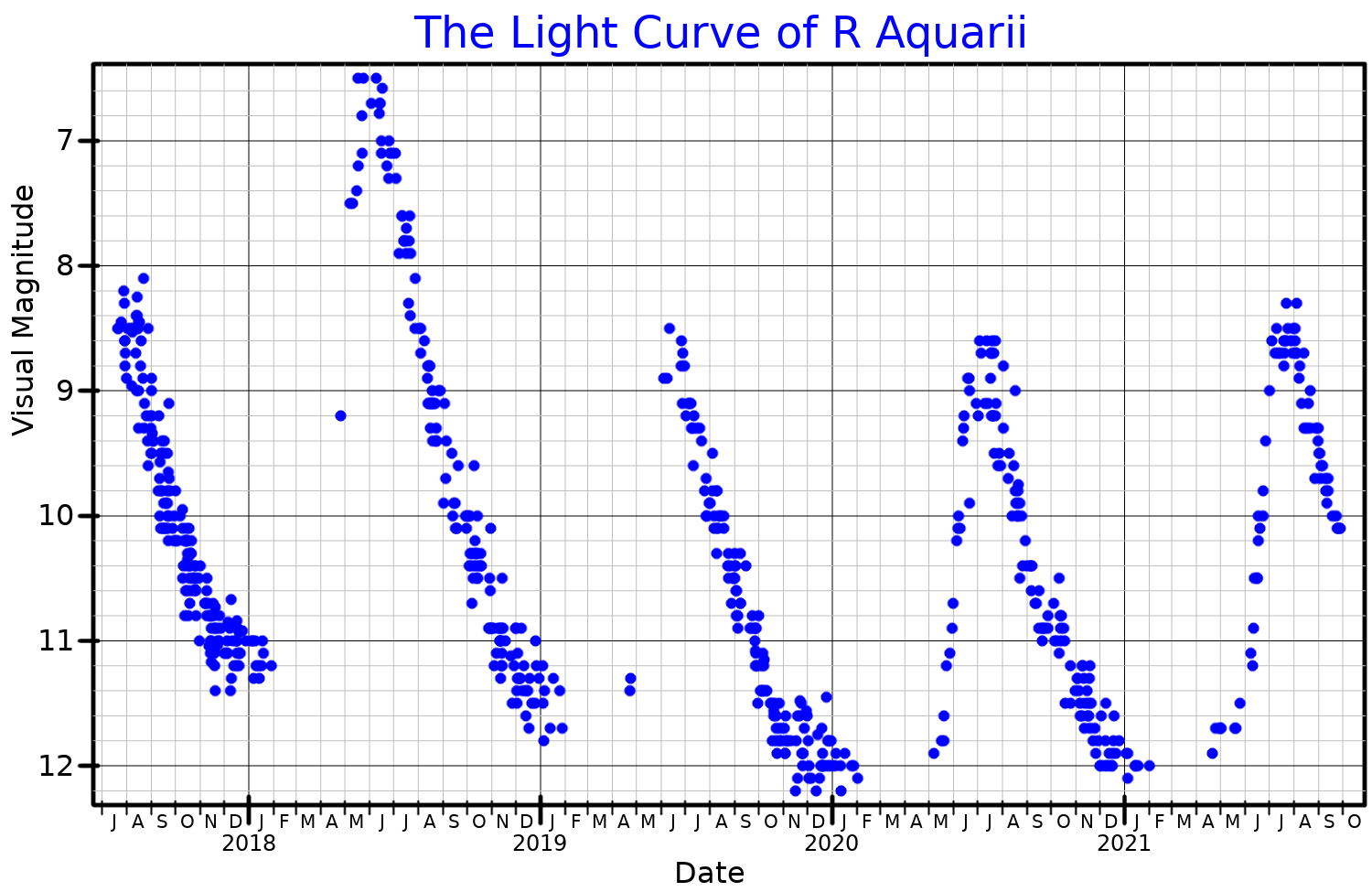
The light curve of R Aquarii, from AAVSO V band data

The nebula around R Aquarii is also known as Cederblad 211. It is possible that the nebula is the remnant of a nova-like outburst, which may have been observed by Japanese astronomers, in the year 930 AD. It is reasonably bright but small and dominated by its central star. Visual observations are difficult and rare. The central region of the jet shows an ejection that took place around 190 years ago, as well as much younger structures. Another jet launched in January 2020 was announced by a 2025 publication. The expansion rate of the jet constrains the distance of the system to 260 ± 27 parsecs (848 ± 88 ly).

== Gallery ==
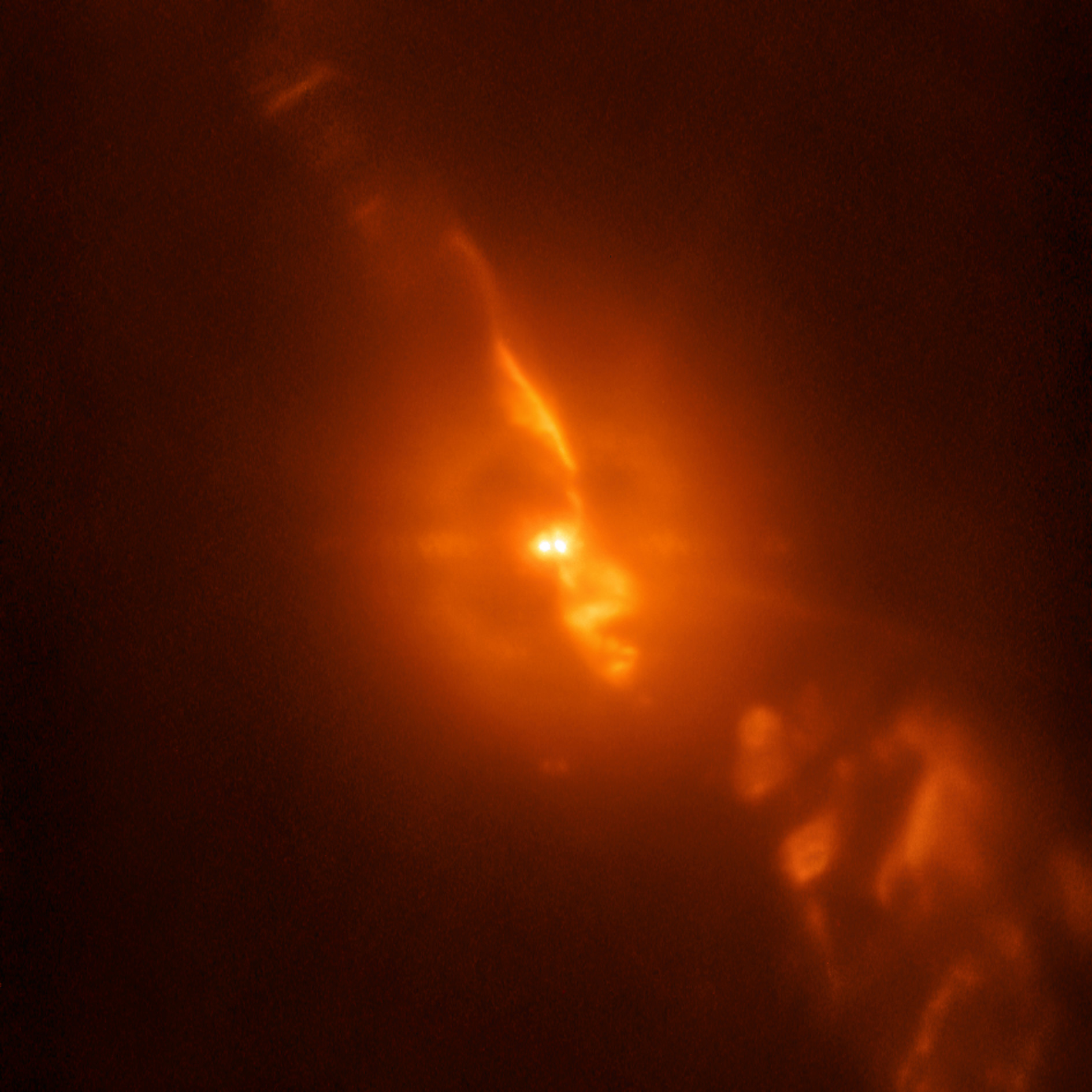
R Aquarii peculiar stellar relationship captured by SPHERE.

R Aquarii as seen in 2012 by ESO's Very Large Telescope.

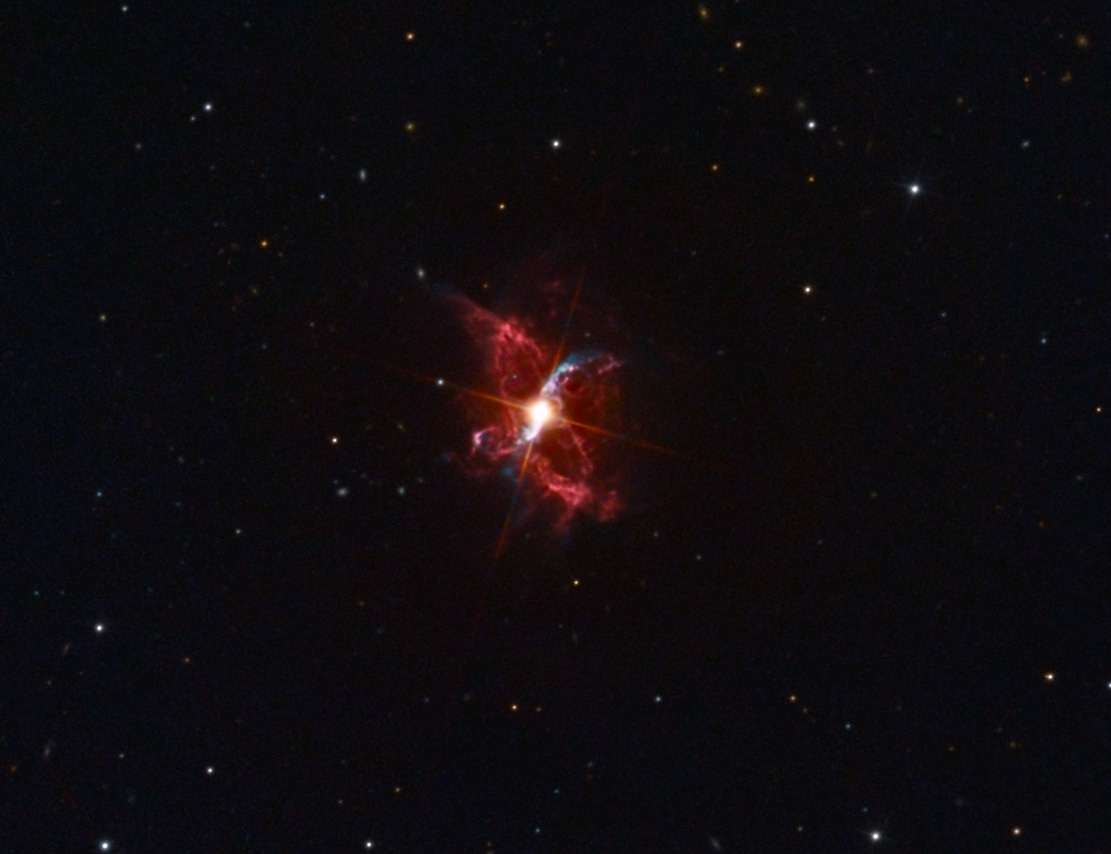
R Aquarii and its surrounding nebulosity

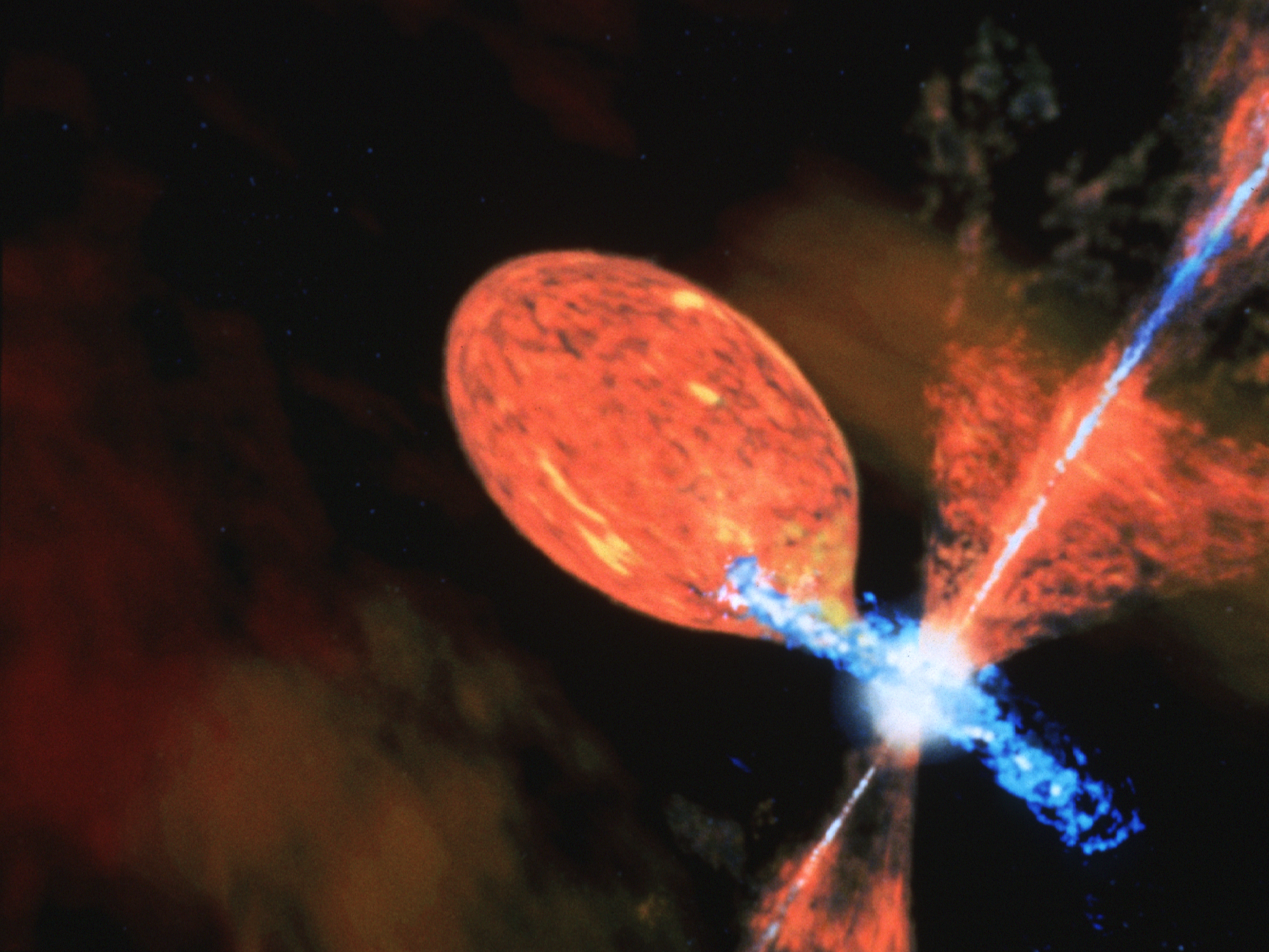
Artist's impression of R Aquarii during an outburst

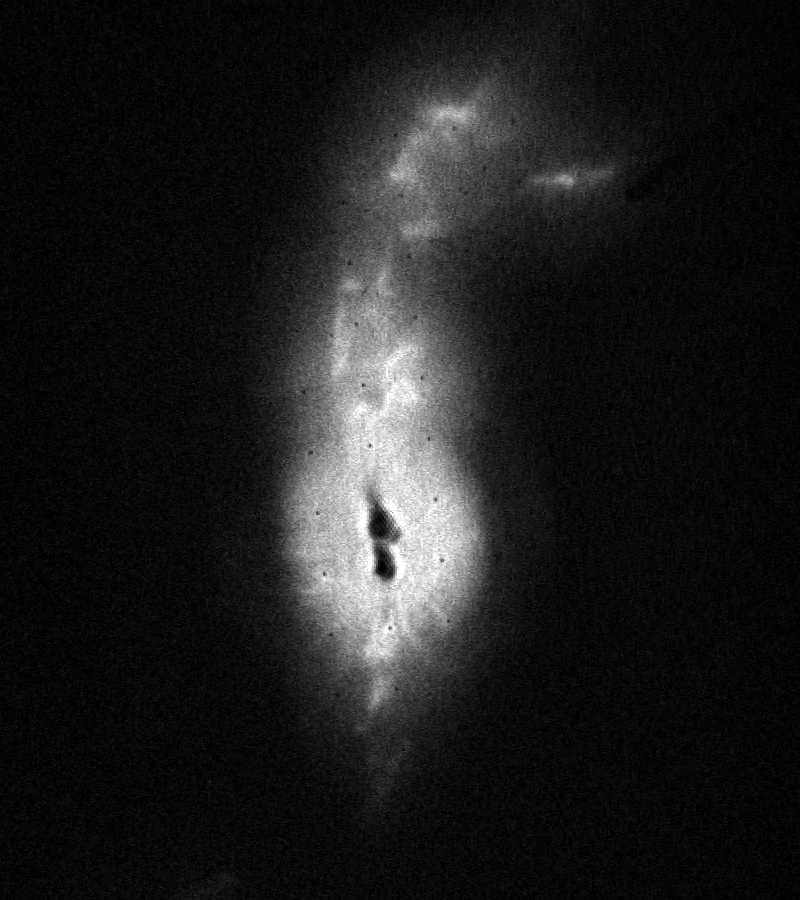
The jet and central regions of the nebula around R Aquarii

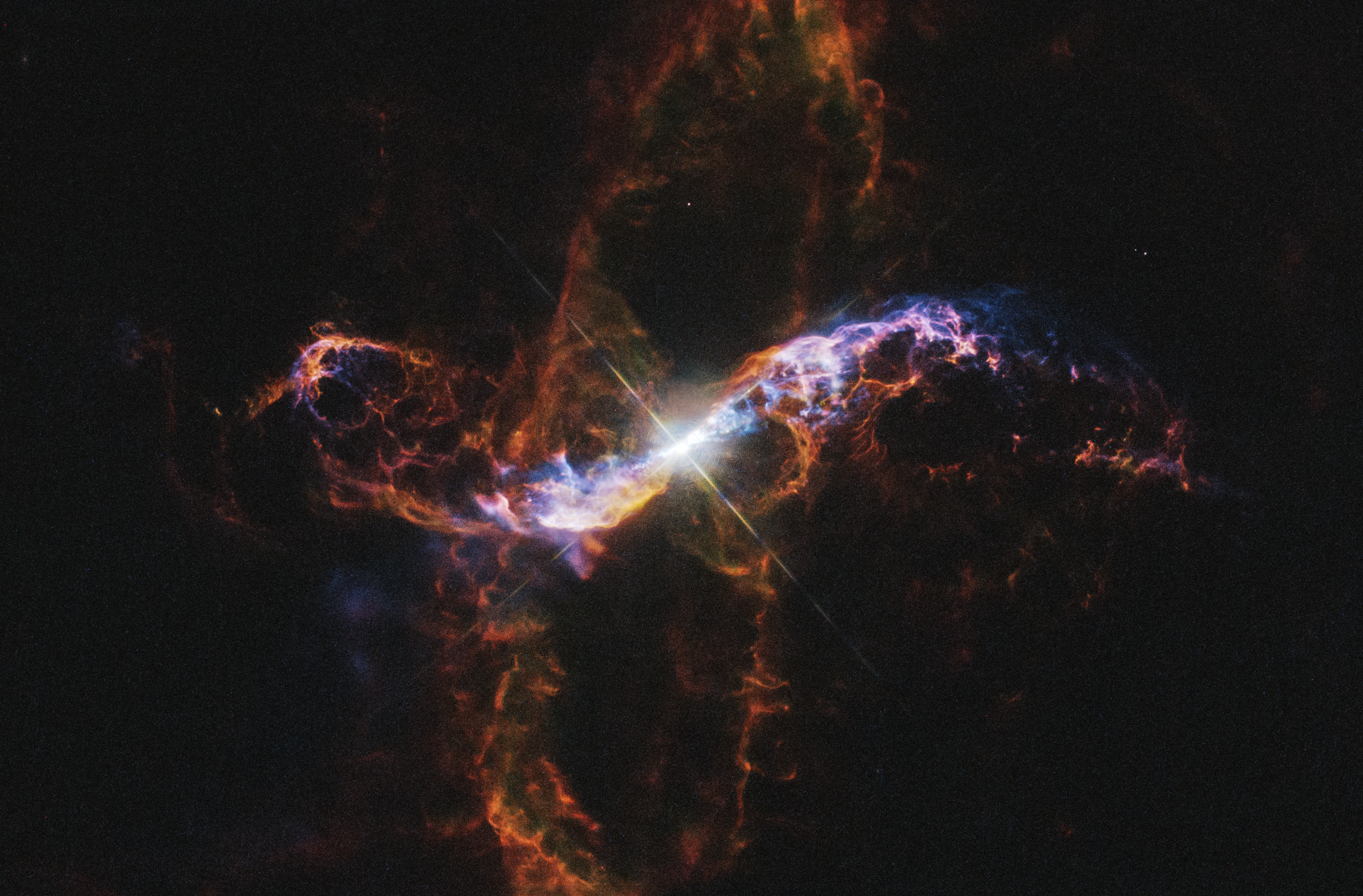
HST image of R Aquarii
