= Ellermann =

Ellermann is a surname. Notable people with the surname include:

- Dina Ellermann (born 1980), Estonian dressage rider
- Dustin Ellermann, American competitive shooter
- Jean-Charles Ellermann-Kingombe, Danish diplomat and civil servant

== See also ==
- Elman (name, surname), Ellman, Ellmann, Ellemann, Ellerman, Ellermann
