= Elman (surname) =

Elman is a surname. Notable people with the name include:

- Dave Elman (1900–1967), American hypnotist
- Kate Elman Wilcott, Canadian politician
- Jeffrey Elman (1948–2018), American psycholinguist and pioneer in the field of neural networks
- Mischa Elman (1891–1967), Ukrainian-born violinist
- Richard Elman (writer) (1934–1997), American author and teacher
- Ziggy Elman (1914–1968), American jazz trumpeter

== See also ==
Elman (name, surname), Ellman, Ellmann, Ellemann, Ellerman, Ellermann
