= New Mogadishu International Airport =

Under construction international airport near Mogadishu, Somalia

New Mogadishu International Airport Somali: Garoonka Diyaaradaha Caalamiga ah ee Cusub ee Muqdisho Arabic: مطار مقديشو الدولي الجديد
- IATA: none; ICAO: none

Summary
- Airport type: Public
- Owner: Government of Somalia
- Serves: Mogadishu, Somalia
- Location: El Maan, 35 km from central Mogadishu
- Coordinates: 2.1996373°N 45.6197267°E
- Website: www.nmdcinvest.com/projects/airport/

Map
- Location within Somalia

Runways
Direction	Length		Surface
Direction	ft	m	Surface
Planned	13,123	4,000	Asphalt
Planned	13,123	4,000	Asphalt
- Under construction as of 2025

New Mogadishu International Airport (Somali: Garoonka Diyaaradaha Caalamiga ah ee Cusub ee Muqdisho, Arabic: مطار مقديشو الدولي الجديد) is an international airport currently under construction near the coastal village of Haawaay, approximately 36 km northeast of Mogadishu, the capital of Somalia. The area is also known as El Maan. The project aims to relieve congestion at Aden Adde International Airport.

== Overview ==
Phase I will include two runways, each measuring 4000 metres (13123 ft) long and 60 metres (198 ft) wide, with the potential of adding a 3rd and 4th runway in the future. Phase I of the project is expected to be completed by 2029.

Phase I of the project will provide the airport with an initial capacity of 5 million passengers, 130,000 aircraft movements, and 100,000 metric tons of cargo annually.

The project is expected to provide employment opportunities for up to 10,000 Somali youth in various aviation-related roles.

== History ==
In the early 2020s, aviation traffic through Aden Adde International Airport increased sharply. The increase reflected expanded regional and domestic connectivity, and a growing Somali diaspora returning home for business and personal visits. During this period, several airlines began or resumed flights to Mogadishu. To relieve the congestion at Aden Adde International Airport, building a new airport at El Maan was proposed and later approved in late 2024.

Officially, on 29 June 2025, Somali President Hassan Sheikh Mohamud laid the foundation stone for the New Mogadishu International Airport at a site within the Warsheekh district of the Middle Shabelle region. The ceremony marked the official commencement of the project following years of technical and environmental assessment. Officials stated that the airport aims to improve national and regional air connectivity while alleviating capacity constraints at Aden Adde International Airport in Mogadishu. The event was attended by senior government officials and local representatives, highlighting the significance of the development within the government's broader infrastructure agenda.

== Project background ==
For years, Aden Adde International Airport in Mogadishu has faced growing pressure. Located deep within the city, it has no space left to expand. As air traffic increased, the need for a second airport became clearer.

By the late 2010s, attention turned to El Maan, a coastal area northeast of Mogadishu's center. The site offered wide open land far from crowded neighborhoods.

Environmental and technical assessments were carried out to evaluate the suitability of the El Maan site for large-scale development. These studies examined air and water quality, flood risks, noise levels, and wildlife impact. The findings confirmed that the area was appropriate for large-scale development.

In December 2024, Somali authorities officially announced plans for a new airport at the El Maan site. Construction began in early 2025. The project is being led by the New Mogadishu Development Corporation under a public-private partnership with Turkish firms. Government statements and project reports estimate that thousands of jobs will be created during the construction period and once the airport becomes operational.

NMIA was proposed as a way to relieve pressure on Aden Adde, but it is also part of efforts to improve Somalia's aviation network and increase international flight operations.

Placing the airport along the coast is expected to reduce the need for displacement within the city and provide space for future expansion. It is also planned to accommodate connecting infrastructure like port access and the proposed Gateway Complex, which is expected to support cargo and logistics operations.

The development is expected to involve both international partners and Somali institutions working together throughout the construction and operational stages. It is intended to follow global aviation standards and aims to build space for training local capacity.

Officials have said the airport is expected to support economic activity, including trade and employment. Future phases of the project may include more runways, hangars, and expanded cargo zones depending on demand.

== Location and features ==
Planned facilities include two parallel runways capable of handling wide-body aircraft, modern passenger and cargo terminals, and a comprehensive air traffic control system.

In early 2026 the Federal Government of Somalia, in coordination with the United Nations Office for Project Services, held a formal kick off meeting for the design phase of the New Mogadishu International Airport. According to the press release, approximately 20 square kilometres of land have been allocated for the development of the airport site.

== Significance ==
NMIA is anticipated to play a key role in enhancing Somalia's air connectivity by easing congestion at Aden Adde International Airport and positioning the country as a regional aviation hub. The airport will support tourism, cargo logistics, humanitarian efforts, and government operations.

The new Mogadishu International Airport is expected to boost Somalia's air connectivity and increase international flights, supporting the government's plans to revive Somali Airlines and enhance regional and global access.

== See also ==
- Transport in Somalia
- Somali Civil War
- Somali Airlines
- List of airports in Somalia
