= Ellerman (crater) =

Lunar impact crater

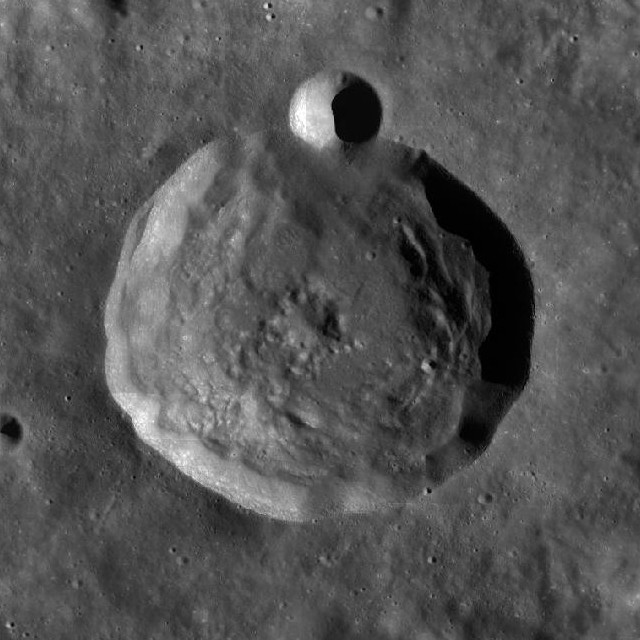
- LRO WAC image
- Coordinates: 25.3°S 120.1°W
- Diameter: 46.21 km (28.71 mi)
- Depth: Unknown
- Colongitude: 121° at sunrise
- Eponym: Ferdinand Ellerman

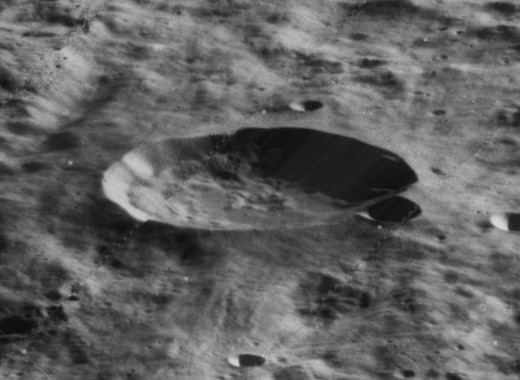
Oblique Lunar Orbiter 5 image, facing west

Ellerman is a lunar impact crater on the far side of the Moon. It lies within the outer blanket of ejecta that surrounds the Mare Orientale impact basin, and is located to the west of the Montes Cordillera mountain range. To the northwest of Ellerman is the larger crater Gerasimovich.

Probably due to its location amidst rugged surroundings, the otherwise circular rim of this crater is somewhat irregular and polygonal in shape. The loose material along the inner walls has slid down to form a ring of talus around the base, leaving walls that slope straight down with no terraces. There is a small crater along the northern rim top.

This formation is named after American astronomer Ferdinand Ellerman (1869-1940). Its designation was formally adopted by the International Astronomical Union in 1970.
