= Nancy Boggess =

American astrophysicist

- Education: University of Michigan
- Scientific career
- Thesis: The structure of NGC 6822 (1967)

Nancy Elizabeth Weber Boggess (1925 – 2019) was an astrophysicist known for her work in developing telescopes that were used in space by NASA.

== Early life and education ==
Boggess was born in 1925. She attended Wheaton College in Massachusetts where she earned a bachelor's degree in mathematics and music. She then earned her master's degree in mathematics from Wellesley College. Boggess completed her education at the University of Michigan with a PhD in astronomy.

== Career ==
Boggess went on to join NASA in 1968 after Nancy Roman heard Boggess speak at a meeting of the American Astronomical Society and offered Boggess a job. Boggess oversaw grant programs at NASA, including serving as a NASA project scientist for the development and launch of Infrared Astronomical Satellite (IRAS), which was able to map the entire night sky in the infrared spectrum. From 1983 until 1984 Boggess worked on the coordinating the development of the Spitzer Space Telescope. Boggess was the project scientist for the team that developed the Cosmic Background Explorer (COBE) which earned a Nobel Prize for John C. Mather and George Smoot in Physics in 2006. Under Boggess' guidance, COBE was a combination of multiple instruments that made precise measurements of the cosmic microwave background radiation that was left over from the Big Bang.

When Boggess retired, she spent time documenting the migration of birds. Boggess died in 2019.

== Selected publications ==
- Mather, J. C.; Cheng, E. S.; Cottingham, D. A.; Eplee, R. E. Jr.; Fixsen, D. J.; Hewagama, T.; Isaacman, R. B.; Jensen, K. A.; Meyer, S. S.; Noerdlinger, P. D.; Read, S. M.; Rosen, L. P.; Shafer, R. A.; Wright, E. L.; Bennett, C. L.; Boggess, N.W.; Hauser, M. G.; Kelsall, T.; Moseley, S.H. Jr.; Silverberg, R.F.; Smoot, G.F.; Weiss, R.; Wilkinson, D.T. (1994-01-01). "Measurement of the Cosmic Microwave Background Spectrum by the COBE FIRAS Instrument". The Astrophysical Journal. 420: 439. Bibcode:1994ApJ...420..439M. doi:10.1086/173574. ISSN 0004-637X.
- Wright, E. L.; Meyer, S. S.; Bennett, C. L.; Boggess, N. W.; Cheng, E. S.; Hauser, M. G.; Kogut, A.; Lineweaver, C.; Mather, J. C.; Smoot, G. F.; Weiss, R.; Gulkis, S.; Hinshaw, G.; Janssen, M.; Kelsall, T. (1992). "Interpretation of the cosmic microwave background radiation anisotropy detected by the COBE Differential Microwave Radiometer". The Astrophysical Journal. 396: L13. Bibcode:1992ApJ...396L..13W. doi:10.1086/186506. ISSN 0004-637X. S2CID 119711693.
- Boggess, N. W.; Mather, J. C.; Weiss, R.; Bennett, C. L.; Cheng, E. S.; Dwek, E.; Gulkis, S.; Hauser, M. G.; Janssen, M. A.; Kelsall, T.; Meyer, S. S.; Moseley, S. H.; Murdock, T. L.; Shafer, R. A.; Silverberg, R. F. (1992). "The COBE mission - Its design and performance two years after launch". The Astrophysical Journal. 397: 420. Bibcode:1992ApJ...397..420B. doi:10.1086/171797. ISSN 0004-637X.

== Awards and honors ==
In 1997 Wheaton College awarded Boggess with an honorary degree. In 2006 Boggess was among the team members who received the Gruber Prize in Cosmology for their work on COBE.
