= El Maan =

El Maan Ceel Macaan
- Town
- Interactive map of El Maan
- Country: Somalia
- Region: Banaadir
- Time zone: UTC+3 (EAT)

El Maan (Somali: Ceel Macaan) is a town in the south-central Banaadir region of Somalia. It is situated around 20 miles north of the capital Mogadishu. A coastal settlement, it has a minor seaport.

The New Mogadishu International Airport is currently being constructed here and is projected to be completed by 2029.
