= Kenwood Astrophysical Observatory =

Observatory in Illinois, US

Coordinates: 41.8117°N 87.6031°W

The Kenwood Astrophysical Observatory was the personal observatory of George Ellery Hale, constructed by his father, William E. Hale, in 1890 at the family home in the Kenwood section of Chicago near Grand avenue. It was here that the spectroheliograph, which Hale had invented while attending MIT, was first put to practical use; and it was here that Hale established the Astrophysical Journal. Kenwood's principal instrument was a twelve-inch refractor telescope, which was used in conjunction with a Rowland grating as part of the spectroheliograph. Hale hired Ferdinand Ellerman as an assistant; years later, the two would work together again at the Mount Wilson Observatory.

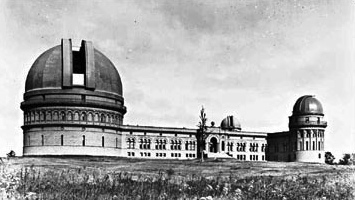
Yerkes Observatory circa 1900 in Williams Bay, Wisconsin, where the twin 12-inch refractor was moved.

Hale's work attracted the attention of many in the astronomical community, and when he was hired at the University of Chicago as a professor of astronomy, more advanced astronomy students initially used the Kenwood Observatory. When Yerkes Observatory was established in 1897, the Kenwood instruments were donated to the University of Chicago and moved to the Yerkes facility in Williams Bay, Wisconsin.

The 12-inch telescope was one of the instruments besides the large 40-inch aperture refractor for the start of Yerkes observatory in the 1890s. The observatory was also called Kenwood Observatory.

The 12-inch refractor is noted as being moved to the north dome of the Yerkes observatory, but was eventually replaced by a 24-inch reflector telescope.

The 12-inch refractor was a double telescope with one for visual observation and another objective for astrophotography.

== See also ==
- List of astronomical observatories
