= Ellerman bomb =

Brightenings in the Sun's photosphere

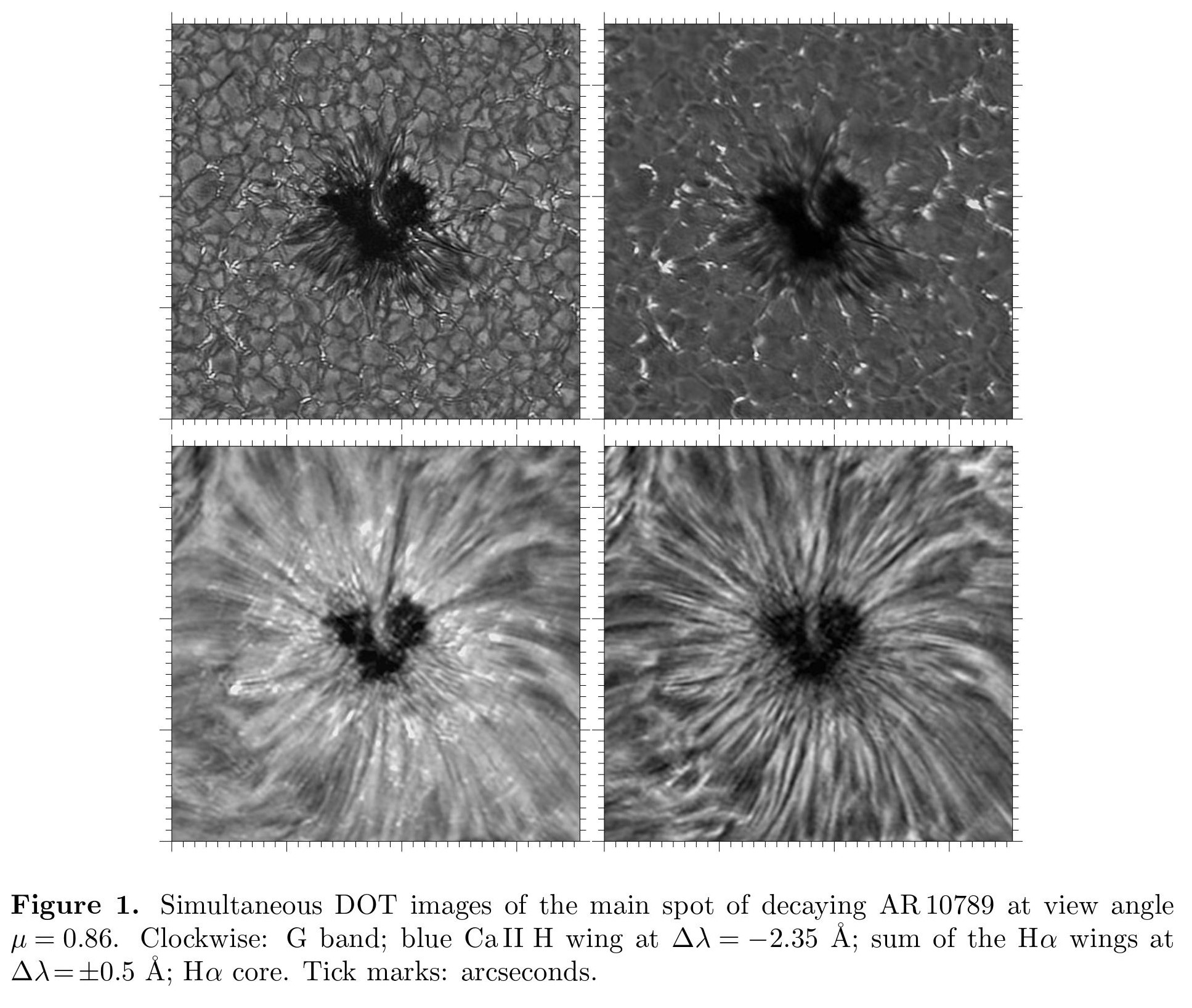
Ellerman bombs or, maybe, pseudo-Ellerman bombs that are simply "network bright points"

In solar physics, Ellerman bombs are intense, small-scale brightenings in the Sun's photosphere. They are only observed in the wings of the Hα, Hβ, and Hγ hydrogen spectral lines and take place in emerging flux regions where emerging magnetic fields interact with existing fields. They are named after Ferdinand Ellerman who studied them in detail in the 20th century.

== History ==
Intense brightenings resembling what would later be referred to as Ellerman bombs were first reported by Walter M. Mitchell in 1909. In 1917, observations of this phenomenon made at the Mount Wilson Solar Observatory were described in detail by Ferdinand Ellerman. He referred to them as "solar hydrogen bombs" in reference to the phenomenon only appearing in observations of hydrogen spectral lines.

== Description ==
As originally described in Ellerman's 1917 paper, Ellerman bombs are intense brightenings in the wings of the Hα, Hβ, and Hγ hydrogen spectral lines with no brightening of the line cores or of other spectral lines. They occur in intergranular lanes in the photosphere exclusively at the sites of emerging flux regions where emerging vertical magnetic fields interact with the existing intergranular field. This interaction is suggested to result in magnetic reconnection, producing the brightenings associated with Ellerman bombs.

The lack of observed brightening of the Hα core is attributed to Ellerman bombs being a photospheric phenomenon. In growing active regions, dense chromospheric, Hα fibrils form a canopy above the photosphere blocking Hα emission from Ellerman bombs below. As a result, only emission in the Hα wings pass through and are observed.
