= Elman Sultanov =

Azerbaijani-Israeli-Ukrainian footballer and coach

Personal information
- Date of birth: 6 May 1974 (age 52)
- Place of birth: Soviet Union
- Height: 1.96 m (6 ft 5 in)
- Position: Midfielder

Senior career*
Years	Team	Apps	(Gls)
1992	Azeri Baku	18	(0)
1992–1993	Tavriya Kherson	2	(0)
1993	Azeri Baku	8	(0)
1993	Vorskla Poltava	10	(0)
1994	Torpedo Zaporizhzhia	8	(0)
1994	Tavriya Kherson	3	(0)
1994	Neftchi Baku	2	(0)
1995	Khazri Buzovna	9	(0)
1996	MOIK Baku	3	(0)
1998–1999	Dinamo Baku	8	(0)
2000–2003	Hapoel Tzafririm Holon		
2003	Žalgiris Vilnius	6	(0)
2004	Bakılı Baku	8	(0)
2004	Qarabağ	1	(0)
2005	MKT-Araz	11	(0)
2006–2007	Simurq	16	(0)

International career^{‡}
1992–2004	Azerbaijan	2	(0)
- * Club domestic league appearances and goals as of 03:24, 14 January 2018 (UTC) ‡ National team caps and goals as of 03:24, 14 January 2018 (UTC)

Elman Sultanov (born 6 May 1974) is an Azerbaijani-Israeli-Ukrainian retired professional footballer and current Reserve team coach for Sabail FK.

== National team statistics ==
Azerbaijan national team
Year	Apps	Goals
1992	1	0
1993	0	0
1994	0	0
1995	0	0
1996	0	0
1997	0	0
1998	0	0
1999	0	0
2000	0	0
2001	0	0
2002	0	0
2003	0	0
2004	1	0
Total	2	0
