= Ferdinand Ellerman =

American astronomer (1869–1940)

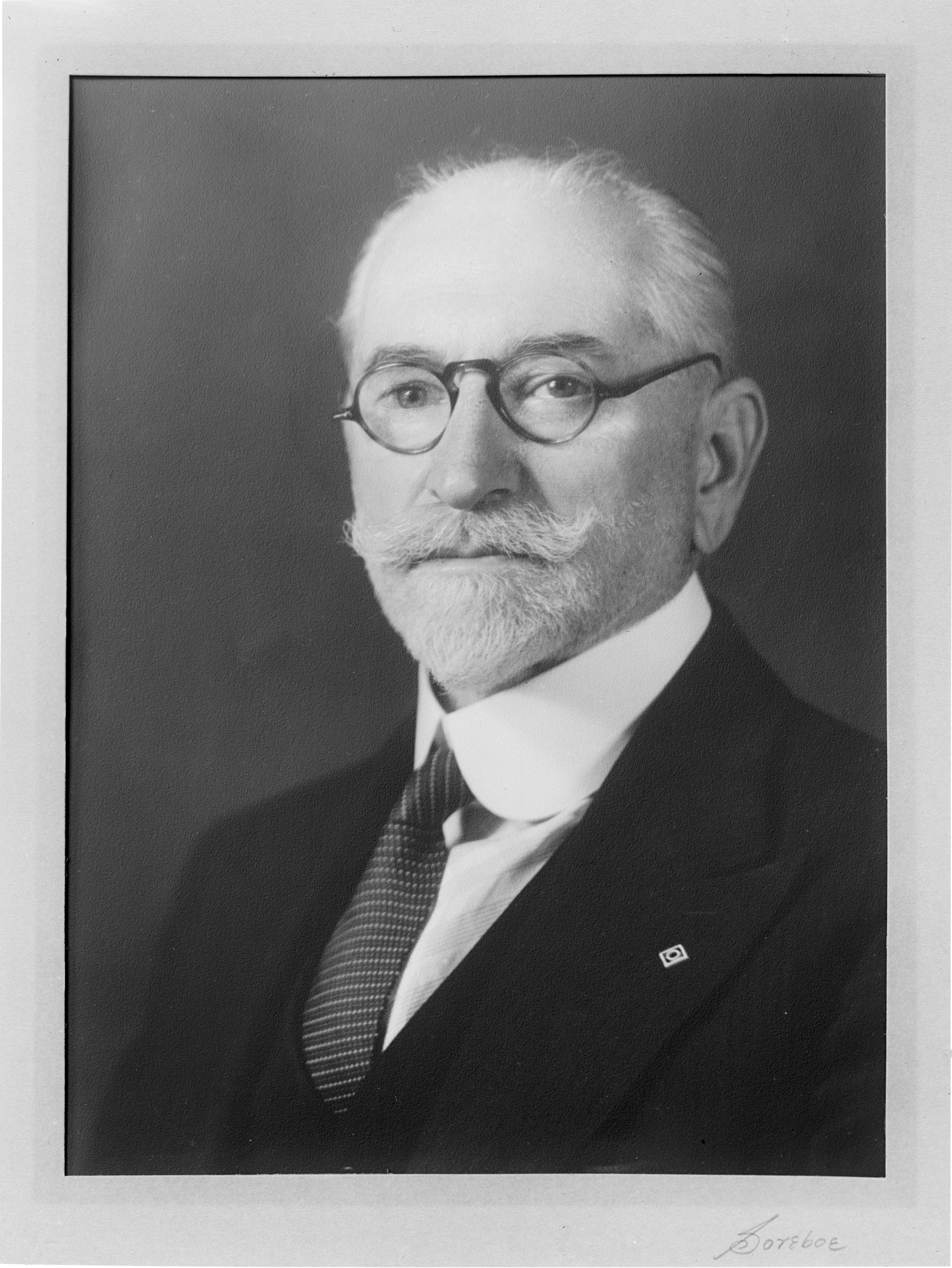
- Ferdinand Ellerman, c. 1920
- Born: May 13, 1869; Centralia, Illinois
- Died: March 20, 1940 (aged 70); Los Angeles, California
- Spouse: Hermine Louise Hoenny
- Children: Louise
- Parents: Mathias Ellerman (father); Rosa A. Fleischbein (mother)

Ferdinand Ellerman (May 13, 1869 to March 20, 1940) was an American astronomer and photographer. He spent a good part of his career as an associate of the solar astronomer George E. Hale, and is known for his study of a phenomenon in the solar chromosphere later dubbed Ellerman bombs.

== Biography ==
He was born in Centralia, Illinois on May 13, 1869, the son of Mathias Ellerman and Rosa A. née Fleischbein. Ferdinand attended High School in Belleville, Illinois, then moved to Chicago and was employed at the James S. Kirk Company, a soap manufacturing business. During his work, he acquired skill in the use of machine tools and photography.

Ellerman was hired as an assistant by astronomer George E. Hale in 1892 to observe at his private Kenwood Observatory in Chicago, beginning a working relationship that would last until Hale's death in 1938. The two likely first met during the initial meeting for the Chicago Section of the Astronomical Society of the Pacific, in November 1890, and Ellerman may have first worked as a volunteer for Hale. Ellerman performed much of the observation work for Hale, who focused on travel and organizational activities. On May 16, 1895, Ellerman was married to Hermine Louise Hoenny. They would have one daughter, Louise, who was born July 29, 1901.

When Hale started Yerkes Observatory in Wisconsin, he brought along Ellerman in 1895. There, Ellerman got along well with the local people and in 1899 was elected clerk of the local county school district. Much of Ellerman's observation time was spent with the Rumford spectroheliograph, as well as photographing the stellar spectra of Secchi's Fourth Type, later termed carbon stars. In 1900, Ellerman joined the AAS solar eclipse expedition to Wadesboro, North Carolina.

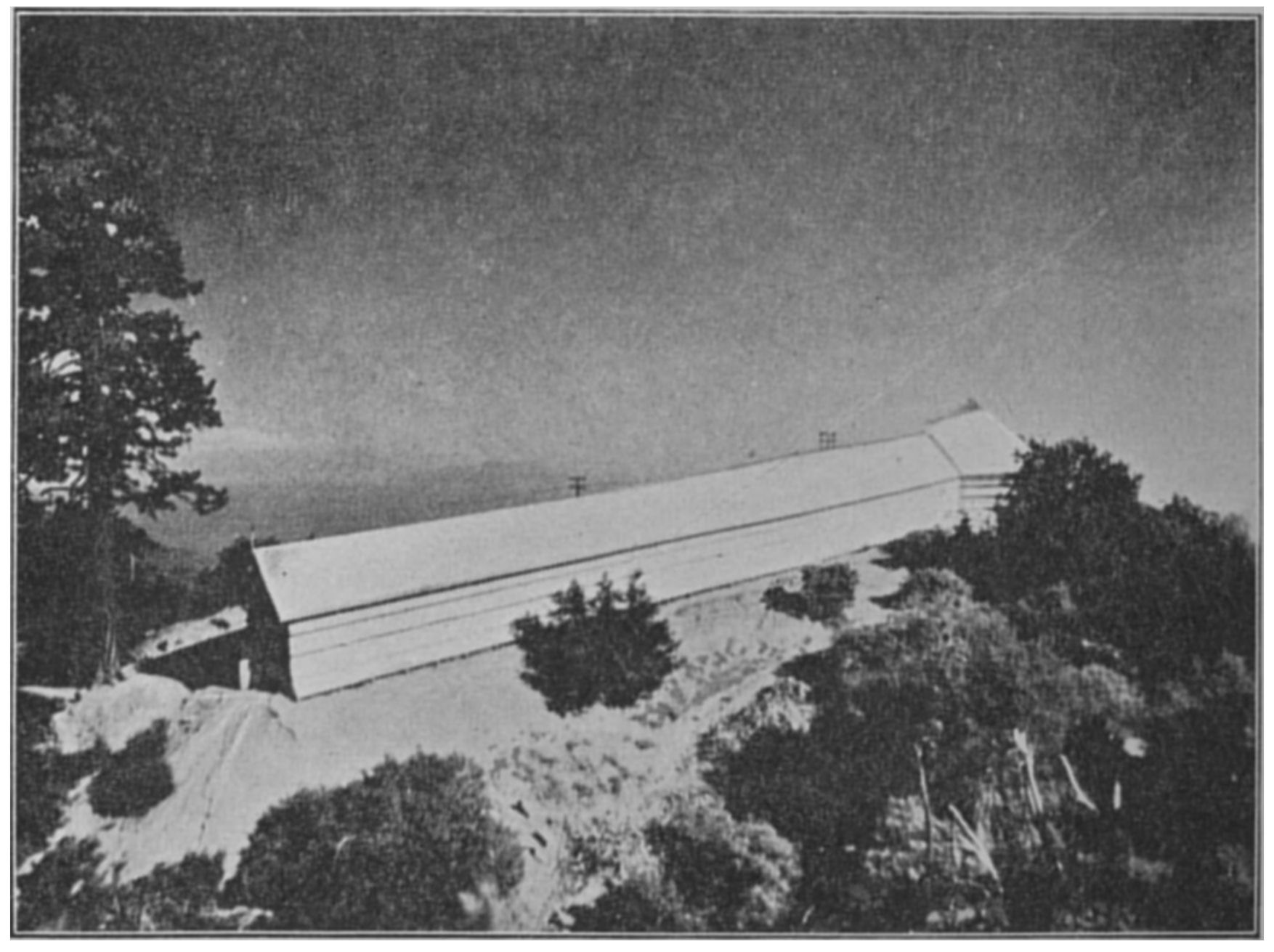
Long shed for the Snow Horizontal Telescope

During March 1904, Ellerman joined Hale on an expedition to investigate the viewing conditions on Mount Wilson in California. The goal was to determine the suitability for a proposed observatory at the site that was to be financed by the Carnegie Institution. The initial planned instrument was to be the Snow Horizontal Telescope, a solar telescope funded by Helen Snow of Chicago. This instrument was made operational on March 15, 1905, with Ellerman serving as the primary observer on the new spectroheliograph. During the early period, Ellerman took a photograph of the Sun in white light nearly every day, then images at a specific wavelength. His skills at repair and jury-rigging equipment proved invaluable at the remote mountain site. A fully-equipped machine shop was soon added to the Observatory for Ellerman's use. Much of the subsequent growth of the Mount Wilson Observatory was documented by Ellerman's photography.

Ellerman's work with Hale resulted in the discovery of solar vortices, which in turn led to the identification of the magnetic fields of Sun spots in 1908. Later work discerned the polarity of Sun spots, which led to the discovery of the reversal of the magnetic field in these features. In 1910, Ellerman was granted a leave from the Carnegie Institution to undergo a one-man expedition to the Hawaiian Islands for the observation of Halley's Comet during its passage. Arriving on March 28, his observation station was set up on Diamond Head, Hawaii. He first sighted the comet on April 14, and by the 25th he was able to take observations. Despite clouds and windy conditions, he took a total of 73 photographs of the comet on 36 different dates.

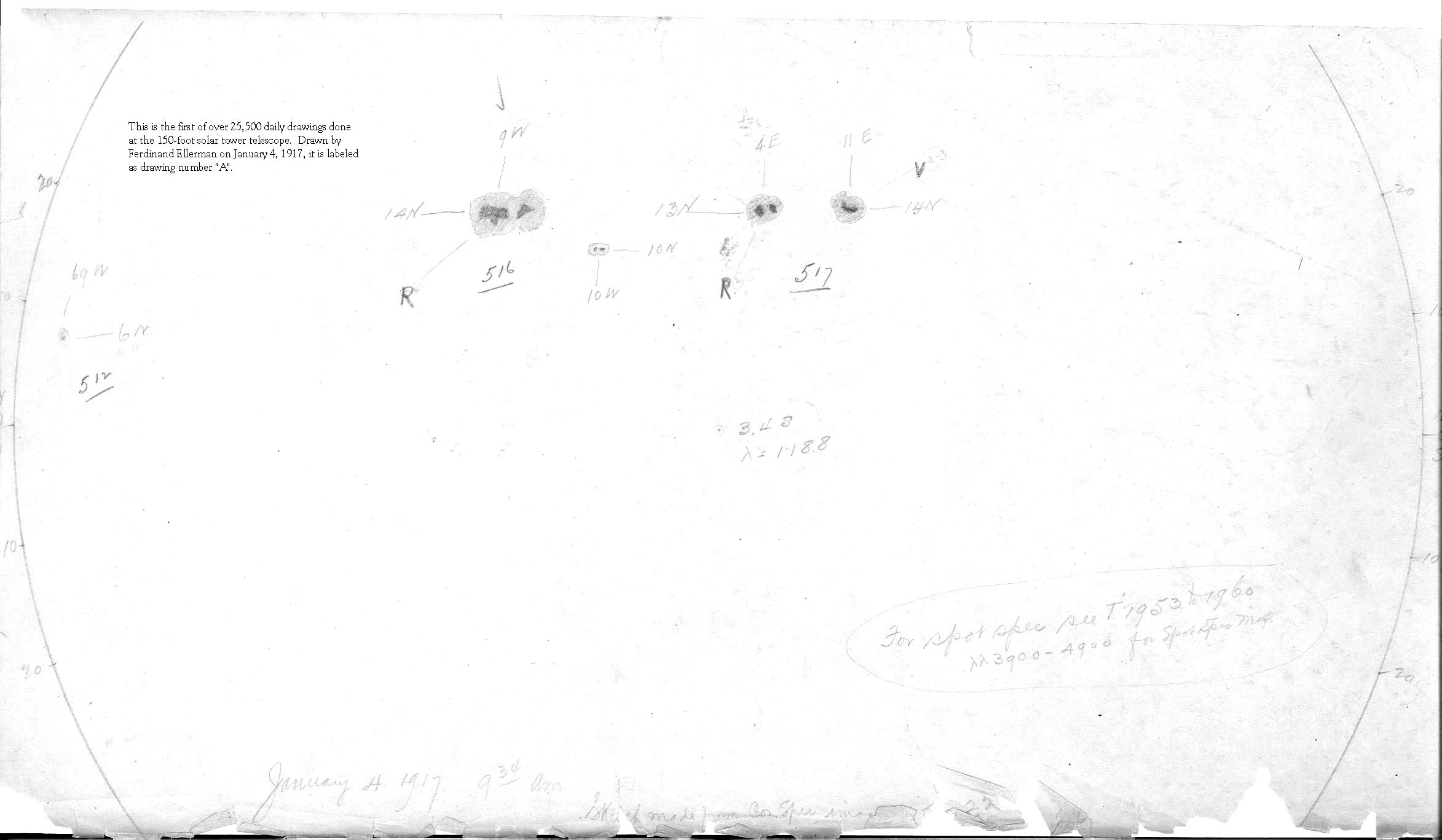
Sunspot illustration by Ellerman, 1917

While at the Mount Wilson Solar Observatory in 1915, Ellerman studied an unusual phenomenon observed at multiple locations in the lower chromosphere layer of the Sun. These events showed bright emission features in the wings of hydrogen-alpha absorption lines. The phenomenon later became referred to as Ellerman bombs, as he observed they were localized and generally only lasted 10–20 minutes. Although Ellerman studied this phenomenon, the original discovery of this behavior was made by W. M. Mitchell in 1900, near an active region of the Sun.

Ellerman received an honorary MS degree from Occidental College on June 20, 1927. During the spring of 1929, Ellerman accompanied E. Hubble and M. L. Humason in a series of trips to find a suitable location for the proposed Hale Telescope. These journeys were made to a hilly region to the south of Los Angeles and to Arizona, with the goal of checking the viewing conditions. Ellerman served as the mechanic for the trip, setting up the small telescopes. His reports would heavily influence the selection of the final site for the telescope.

Ellerman retired in 1938. During a bout of influenza, he died of pneumonia on March 20, 1940, at the Queen of Angels Hospital in Los Angeles, California. Ellerman was considered a friendly, jolly, talkative man. He was an outdoorsman who was interested in sports, participated in the local community, and lectured in popular astronomy.

The 46.21 km (28.71 mi) diameter Ellerman crater on the far side of the Moon was named after him by the IAU in 1970.
