= Ellman =

Ellman is a surname. Notable people with the surname include:

- John Ellman, agriculturalist of Glynde who developed the Southdown breed of sheep
- Louise Ellman, British politician
- Mark Ellman, see Maui Tacos
- Michael Ellman, Dutch economist

== See also ==
- Elman (name, surname), Ellman, Ellmann, Ellemann, Ellerman, Ellermann
- Ellman's
- Ellman's reagent, a chemical compound used to quantify the number or concentration of thiol groups in a sample
