= Simona =

Simona may refer to:

- 1033 Simona, a main-belt asteroid
- Saini Simona, Tuvaluan civil servant
- Simona (film), an Italian film starring Laura Antonelli and directed by Patrick Longchamps
- Simona (given name), a feminine given name of Hebrew origin
- Simona (TV series), a 2018 Argentine telenovela
- Simona (cicada), a genus of cicadas

== See also ==
- Simon (disambiguation)
- Simone (disambiguation)
