= 993 Moultona =

Main-belt asteroid

Discovery
- Discovered by: G. van Biesbroeck
- Discovery site: Yerkes Obs.
- Discovery date: 12 January 1923

Designations
- Named after: Forest Ray Moulton (American astronomer)
- Alternative designations: 1923 NJ · 1928 BA; 1960 WD · 1964 PQ; 1967 CN
- Minor planet category: main-belt · (outer); Koronis

Orbital characteristics
- Epoch 23 March 2018 (JD 2458200.5)
- Uncertainty parameter 0
- Observation arc: 86.00 yr (31,410 d)
- Aphelion: 2.9991 AU
- Perihelion: 2.7218 AU
- Semi-major axis: 2.8604 AU
- Eccentricity: 0.0485
- Orbital period (sidereal): 4.84 yr (1,767 d)
- Mean anomaly: 272.19°
- Mean motion: 0° 12^{m} 13.32^{s} / day
- Inclination: 1.7799°
- Longitude of ascending node: 184.26°
- Argument of perihelion: 249.56°

Physical characteristics
- Mean diameter: 12.43±1.13 km 15.15±1.17 km
- Synodic rotation period: 5.2712±0.0007 h
- Geometric albedo: 0.147; 0.315
- Spectral type: S (assumed)
- Absolute magnitude (H): 11.4; 11.80

993 Moultona, provisional designation 1923 NJ, is a Koronian asteroid from the outer regions of the asteroid belt, approximately 14 kilometers (8.7 miles) in diameter. It was discovered on 12 January 1923, by astronomer George Van Biesbroeck at the Yerkes Observatory in Williams Bay, Wisconsin, in the United States. The likely elongated asteroid has a rotation period of 5.3 hours. It was named after American astronomer Forest Ray Moulton.

== Orbit and classification ==
Moultona is a core member of the Koronis family (605), a very large outer asteroid family with nearly co-planar ecliptical orbits. It orbits the Sun in the outer main-belt at a distance of 2.7–3.0 AU once every 4 years and 10 months (1,767 days; semi-major axis of 2.86 AU). Its orbit has an eccentricity of 0.05 and an inclination of 2° with respect to the ecliptic. The body's observation arc begins with a precovery taken at the Lowell Observatory in October 1931, more than 12 years after to its official discovery observation at Williams Bay.

== Naming ==
This minor planet was named after Forest Ray Moulton (1872–1952), an American astronomer and mathematician known for research in celestial mechanics. The official naming citation was mentioned in The Names of the Minor Planets by Paul Herget in 1955 (H 50). The lunar crater Moulton was also named in his honor.

== Physical characteristics ==
Moultona is an assumed S-type asteroid.

=== Rotation period ===
In December 2014, a rotational lightcurve of Moultona was obtained from photometric observations by French amateur astronomer Laurent Bernasconi. Lightcurve analysis gave a well-defined rotation period of 5.2712±0.0007 hours with a high brightness amplitude of 0.73 magnitude, indicative of a non-spherical, elongated shape (U=3)

=== Diameter and albedo ===
According to the surveys carried out by the Japanese Akari satellite and the NEOWISE mission of NASA's Wide-field Infrared Survey Explorer, Moultona measures between 12.43 and 15.15 kilometers in diameter and its surface has an albedo between 0.147 and 0.315. The Collaborative Asteroid Lightcurve Link assumes an albedo of 0.24 and calculates a diameter of 14.24 kilometers based on an absolute magnitude of 11.4.
