= 1312 Vassar =

Carbonaceous Alauda asteroid

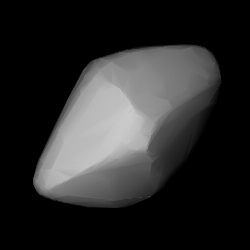
- Modelled shape of Vassar from its lightcurve

Discovery
- Discovered by: G. van Biesbroeck
- Discovery site: Yerkes Obs.
- Discovery date: 27 July 1933

Designations
- Named after: Vassar College (Vassar Observatory)
- Alternative designations: 1933 OT · 1944 QE; A908 CD
- Minor planet category: main-belt · (outer); Alauda

Orbital characteristics
- Epoch 4 September 2017 (JD 2458000.5)
- Uncertainty parameter 0
- Observation arc: 83.67 yr (30,562 days)
- Aphelion: 3.7605 AU
- Perihelion: 2.4268 AU
- Semi-major axis: 3.0937 AU
- Eccentricity: 0.2156
- Orbital period (sidereal): 5.44 yr (1,988 days)
- Mean anomaly: 104.98°
- Mean motion: 0° 10^{m} 51.96^{s} / day
- Inclination: 21.901°
- Longitude of ascending node: 129.45°
- Argument of perihelion: 261.33°

Physical characteristics
- Dimensions: 27.56±6.84 km 32.70±1.29 km 36.28±1.1 km (IRAS:6); 36.32 km (derived)
- Synodic rotation period: 7.93189±0.00001 h 7.93190±0.00005 h 7.932±0.002 h (Note: Higgins (2011) web: rotation period 7.932±0.002 hours with a brightness amplitude of 0.35 mag. Summary figures for (1312) Vassar at Collaborative Asteroid Lightcurve Link (CALL) and Asteroid lightcurves at the Hunters Hill Observatory Higgins, D.J. (2011))
- Geometric albedo: 0.0643±0.004 (IRAS:6); 0.0703 (derived); 0.081±0.007; 0.09±0.07
- Spectral type: C
- Absolute magnitude (H): 10.68 · 10.7 · 10.76±0.44 · 10.80

1312 Vassar, provisional designation 1933 OT, is a carbonaceous Alauda asteroid from the outer region of the asteroid belt, approximately 30 kilometers in diameter. It was discovered on 27 July 1933, by Belgian–American astronomer George Van Biesbroeck at Yerkes Observatory in Wisconsin, United States. The asteroid was named for the American Vassar College.

== Orbit and classification ==
Vassar is a member of the Alauda family (902), a large family of typically bright carbonaceous asteroids and named after its parent body, 702 Alauda.

It orbits the Sun in the outer main-belt at a distance of 2.4–3.8 AU once every 5 years and 5 months (1,988 days). Its orbit has an eccentricity of 0.22 and an inclination of 22° with respect to the ecliptic. In 1908, it was first identified as A908 CD at Heidelberg Observatory. The body's observation arc begins with its official discovery observation at Yerkes in 1933.

== Physical characteristics ==
=== Rotation period and pole ===
In November 2011 American amateur astronomer David Higgins obtained a rotational lightcurve of Vassar from photometric observations taken at the Hunters Hill Observatory (E14) in Australia. It gave a well-defined rotation period of 7.932 hours with a brightness variation of 0.35 magnitude (U=3). In 2016, two modeled lightcurves were derived using data from the Lowell photometric database and other sources, giving a concurring period of 7.93189 and 7.93190 hours and a spin axis of (104.0°, −50°) and (251.0°, −23.0°) in ecliptic coordinates, respectively (U=n.a.).

=== Diameter and albedo ===
According to the surveys carried out by the Infrared Astronomical Satellite IRAS, the Japanese Akari satellite, and NASA's Wide-field Infrared Survey Explorer with its subsequent NEOWISE mission, Vassar measures between 27.56 and 36.28 kilometers in diameter, and its surface has an albedo between 0.064 and 0.09. The Collaborative Asteroid Lightcurve Link agrees with the results obtained by IRAS and derives an albedo of 0.0703 and a diameter of 36.32 kilometers with an absolute magnitude of 10.7.

== Naming ==
This minor planet was named by American astronomer Maud Worcester Makemson (1891–1977) after the U.S Vassar College (formerly: Vassar Female College), located in New York state. Makemson, who computed the asteroid's orbit, was a teacher at the private elite school and director of its Vassar College Observatory. Naming citation was first published in The Names of the Minor Planets by Paul Herget in 1955 (H 120).
