= 2253 Espinette =

Stony asteroid and sizable Mars-crosser

Discovery
- Discovered by: G. van Biesbroeck
- Discovery site: Yerkes Obs.
- Discovery date: 30 July 1932

Designations
- Named after: Espinette (discoverer's residence)
- Alternative designations: 1932 PB · 1939 RJ; 1953 VB_{1} · 1970 PM; 1977 TG
- Minor planet category: Mars-crosser

Orbital characteristics
- Epoch 4 September 2017 (JD 2458000.5)
- Uncertainty parameter 0
- Observation arc: 84.74 yr (30,953 days)
- Aphelion: 2.9195 AU
- Perihelion: 1.6477 AU
- Semi-major axis: 2.2836 AU
- Eccentricity: 0.2785
- Orbital period (sidereal): 3.45 yr (1,260 days)
- Mean anomaly: 228.40°
- Mean motion: 0° 17^{m} 8.16^{s} / day
- Inclination: 3.8804°
- Longitude of ascending node: 143.96°
- Argument of perihelion: 175.75°

Physical characteristics
- Dimensions: 7.03 km (derived)
- Synodic rotation period: 7.3±0.2 h 7.440±0.002 h 7.442±0.001; 7.442±0.002 h (Note: Skiff (2011) web: rotation period 7.442±0.002 hours with a brightness amplitude of 0.25 mag and an LCDB-quality code of 3. Summary figures at Collaborative Asteroid Lightcurve Link (CALL) for (2253) Espinette)
- Geometric albedo: 0.20 (assumed)
- Spectral type: SMASS = Sl · S
- Absolute magnitude (H): 12.8 · 13.13±0.12 · 16.06±0.31

2253 Espinette, provisional designation 1932 PB, is a stony asteroid and sizable Mars-crosser from the innermost regions of the asteroid belt, approximately 7 kilometers in diameter. Discovered by George Van Biesbroeck in 1932, the asteroid was named after the discoverer's residence "Espinette".

== Discovery ==
Espinette was discovered on 30 July 1932, by Belgian–American astronomer George Van Biesbroeck at the U.S. Yerkes Observatory, Wisconsin. The body was independently discovered on the following night by English-born South-African astronomer Cyril Jackson at Johannesburg, and by Soviet–Russian astronomer Grigory Neujmin at Simeiz Observatory on the Crimean peninsula, on August 4. No precoveries were taken. The asteroid's observation arc begins a few days after its official discovering observation.

== Orbit and classification ==
The asteroid orbits the Sun in the inner main-belt at a distance of 1.6–2.9 AU once every 3 years and 5 months (1,260 days). Its orbit has an eccentricity of 0.28 and an inclination of 4° with respect to the ecliptic.

== Physical characteristics ==
In the SMASS taxonomic scheme, Espinette is classified as a Sl-subtype, which transitions from the common S-type asteroids to the much redder L-type asteroids.

=== Rotation period ===
Several rotational lightcurves of Espinette have been obtained. In April 2011, photometric observations by American astronomer Brian A. Skiff rendered a well-defined rotation period of 7.442±0.002 hours with a brightness variation of 0.25 magnitude (U=3).

In August 2015, another observation by Robert Stephens at the Center for Solar System Studies (U81), California, gave an identical period of 7.442±0.001 with an amplitude of 0.44 magnitude (U=3). Previous observations by Polish astronomer Wiesław Z. Wiśniewski in 1987, and by Italian Federico Manzini in 2005, rendered similar results (U=2/2).

=== Diameter and albedo ===
The Collaborative Asteroid Lightcurve Link assumes a standard albedo for stony asteroids of 0.20 and derives a diameter of 7.0 kilometers.

== Naming ==
This minor planet was named "Espinette" after the discoverer's U.S. home in Williams Bay, Wisconsin, located near the discovering Yerkes Observatory. At their home, the Van Biesbroecks accommodated visitors of the observatory from all over the world. The name "Espinette" was proposed by the discoverer's children, and it refers to a coffeehouse in Belgium. The official naming citation was published by the Minor Planet Center on 1 June 1981 (M.P.C. 6059).
