= 1046 Edwin =

Background asteroid

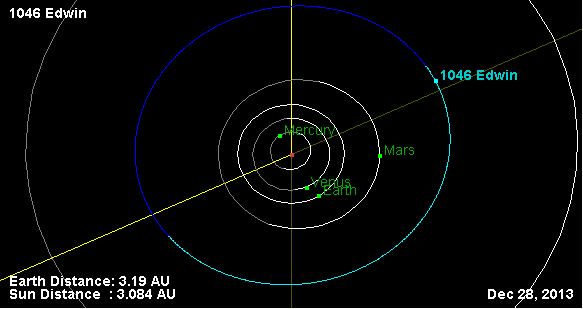
- Orbital diagram of 1046 Edwin

Discovery
- Discovered by: G. van Biesbroeck
- Discovery site: Yerkes Obs.
- Discovery date: 1 December 1924

Designations
- Named after: Edwin Van Biesbroeck (discoverer's son)
- Alternative designations: 1924 UA · 1949 RB; 1949 YL
- Minor planet category: main-belt · (outer) background

Orbital characteristics
- Epoch 23 March 2018 (JD 2458200.5)
- Uncertainty parameter 0
- Observation arc: 91.86 yr (33,553 d)
- Aphelion: 3.1769 AU
- Perihelion: 2.7895 AU
- Semi-major axis: 2.9832 AU
- Eccentricity: 0.0649
- Orbital period (sidereal): 5.15 yr (1,882 d)
- Mean anomaly: 53.846°
- Mean motion: 0° 11^{m} 28.68^{s} / day
- Inclination: 7.8991°
- Longitude of ascending node: 10.745°
- Argument of perihelion: 47.898°

Physical characteristics
- Mean diameter: 25.15±0.66 km 29.084±0.405 km 36.355±0.604 km 42.23 km (calculated)
- Synodic rotation period: 5.29±0.01 h (Note: Lightcurve plot of (1046) Edwin by Robert A. Koff at the Antelope Hills Observatory. Rotation period 5.29±0.01 hours. Quality code of 2+.); 5.2906±0.0001 h 5.296±0.006 h 5.30±0.02 h
- Geometric albedo: 0.057 (assumed); 0.1113±0.0145; 0.201±0.039; 0.235±0.014
- Spectral type: SMASS = Xe · M
- Absolute magnitude (H): 10.20 · 10.6; 11.08±0.29

1046 Edwin, provisional designation 1924 UA, is a background asteroid from the outer regions of the asteroid belt, approximately 30 kilometers (20 miles) kilometers in diameter. It was discovered on 1 December 1924, by Belgian–American astronomer George Van Biesbroeck at the Yerkes Observatory in Wisconsin, United States, who named it after his son, Edwin Van Biesbroeck. The potentially metallic asteroid has a short rotation period of 5.29 hours.

== Orbit and classification ==
Edwin is a non-family asteroid from the main belt's background population. It orbits the Sun in the outer asteroid belt at a distance of 2.8–3.2 AU once every 5 years and 2 months (1,882 days; semi-major axis of 2.98 AU). Its orbit has an eccentricity of 0.06 and an inclination of 8° with respect to the ecliptic. The body's observation arc begins with its first recorded observation at Heidelberg Observatory in March 1926, or 15 months after its official discovery observation at Yerkes Observatory.

== Physical characteristics ==
In the SMASS classification, Edwin is an Xe-subtype that transitions from the X-type to the very bright E-type asteroid It has also been characterized as a metallic M-type asteroid by the Wide-field Infrared Survey Explorer (WISE).

=== Rotation period ===
Since 2001, several rotational lightcurves of Edwin have been obtained from photometric observations by American William Koff at the Antelope Hills Observatory (H09) in Colorado, Richard Ditteon at the Oakley Observatory in Indiana, and French amateur astronomers Pierre Antonini, René Roy and Stéphane Charbonnel.

Analysis of the best-rated lightcurve by Pierre Antonini from November 2006, gave a rotation period of 5.2906 hours with a brightness amplitude of 0.27 magnitude (U=3). While not being a fast rotator, it has a relatively short spin-rate for an asteroid of its size.

=== Diameter and albedo ===
According to the surveys carried out by the Japanese Akari satellite and the NEOWISE mission of NASA's WISE telescope, Edwin measures between 25.15 and 36.355 kilometers in diameter and its surface has an albedo between 0.1113 and 0.235.

The Collaborative Asteroid Lightcurve Link assumes a standard albedo for carbonaceous asteroids of 0.057 and consequently calculates a larger diameter of 42.23 kilometers based on an absolute magnitude of 10.6.

== Naming ==
This minor planet was named after Edwin Van Biesbroeck, son of discoverer George Van Biesbroeck. The official naming citation was mentioned in The Names of the Minor Planets by Paul Herget in 1955 (H 99).
