= 1027 Aesculapia =

Themistian asteroid

Discovery
- Discovered by: G. van Biesbroeck
- Discovery site: Yerkes Obs.
- Discovery date: 11 November 1923

Designations
- Pronunciation: /ɛskjʊˈleɪpiə/
- Named after: Aesculāpius (Greek/Roman deity)
- Alternative designations: YO 11 · 1942 DH; 1977 LP_{1} · Arequipa 28; 1908 BR
- Minor planet category: main-belt · Themis

Orbital characteristics
- Epoch 16 February 2017 (JD 2457800.5)
- Uncertainty parameter 0
- Observation arc: 108.41 yr (39,595 days)
- Aphelion: 3.5625 AU
- Perihelion: 2.7408 AU
- Semi-major axis: 3.1517 AU
- Eccentricity: 0.1304
- Orbital period (sidereal): 5.60 yr (2,044 days)
- Mean anomaly: 121.70°
- Mean motion: 0° 10^{m} 34.32^{s} / day
- Inclination: 1.2537°
- Longitude of ascending node: 29.346°
- Argument of perihelion: 132.13°

Physical characteristics
- Dimensions: 31.225±0.164 km 32.05 km (derived); 32.20±1.4 km 32.38±8.42 km 34.464±0.335 km 35.25±13.39 km 38.55±0.82 km
- Synodic rotation period: 6.83±0.10 h (incorrect); 9.791±0.002 h 10 h (fragmentary); 13.529±0.042 h (Note: Hess (2017): rotation period 13.529±0.042 hours with a brightness amplitude of 0.09 mag and Quality Code of 2. Summary figures at Collaborative Asteroid Lightcurve Link (CALL) for (1027) Aesculapia); 19.506±0.1501 h
- Geometric albedo: 0.06±0.08; 0.07±0.05; 0.071±0.003; 0.0750 (derived); 0.0856±0.0056; 0.0981±0.009; 0.129±0.014
- Spectral type: S
- Absolute magnitude (H): 10.6 · 10.80 · 10.9 · 10.95 · 11.089±0.001 (S)

1027 Aesculapia, provisional designation YO 11, is a Themistian asteroid from the outer region of the asteroid belt, approximately 33 kilometers in diameter.

It was discovered on 11 November 1923, by Belgian–American astronomer George Van Biesbroeck at Yerkes Observatory in Williams Bay, Wisconsin, United States. It is named for Aesculapius, the god of medicine in Greek mythology.

== Classification and orbit ==
Aesculapia is a member of the Themis family, a dynamical group of carbonaceous outer-belt asteroids which are known for their nearly coplanar ecliptical orbits. It orbits the Sun at a distance of 2.7–3.6 AU once every 5 years and 7 months (2,044 days). Its orbit has an eccentricity of 0.13 and an inclination of 1° with respect to the ecliptic.

In 1899, it was first identified at Harvard Observatory's Boyden Station in Arequipa, Peru, and catalogued with the ad-hoc provisional designation "Arequipa 28". It was later seen at Heidelberg in 1908, and identified as 1908 BR, 15 years prior to its official discovery observation at Williams Bay.

== Diameter and albedo ==
According to the surveys carried out by the Infrared Astronomical Satellite IRAS, the Japanese Akari satellite, and NASA's Wide-field Infrared Survey Explorer with its subsequent NEOWISE mission, Aesculapia measures between 31.225 and 38.55 kilometers in diameter, and its surface has an albedo between and 0.06 and 0.129.

The Collaborative Asteroid Lightcurve Link (CALL) derives an albedo of 0.075 and a diameter of 32.05 kilometers with an absolute magnitude of 10.9. Despite the body's low albedo, CALL classifies Aesculapia as a S-type rather than a C-type asteroid.

== Photometry ==
In the last 20 years, photometric observations of Aesculapia gave several rotational lightcurves with significantly divergent rotation periods. First results obtained by Chester Maleszewski and René Roy were only fragmentary or incorrect (U=1/1). Photometry at the Palomar Transient Factory and observations by Astronomer Steven Ehlert gave a period of 9.791 and 19.506 hours with a brightness amplitude of 0.09 and 0.19 magnitude, respectively (U=2/2). CALL currently adopts a lightcurve obtained by Kylie Hess at Oakley Southern Sky Observatory in March 2015, which gave a period of 13.529 hours and a brightness variation of 0.09 magnitude (U=2).

== Naming ==
This minor planet was named for Aesculapius, the Greek and Roman demigod of medicine and healing, son of Apollo and Coronis, after whom the asteroids 158 Koronis and 1862 Apollo are named, respectively. Naming citation was first mentioned in The Names of the Minor Planets by Paul Herget in 1955 (H 98).
