= 1270 Datura =

Main-belt asteroid

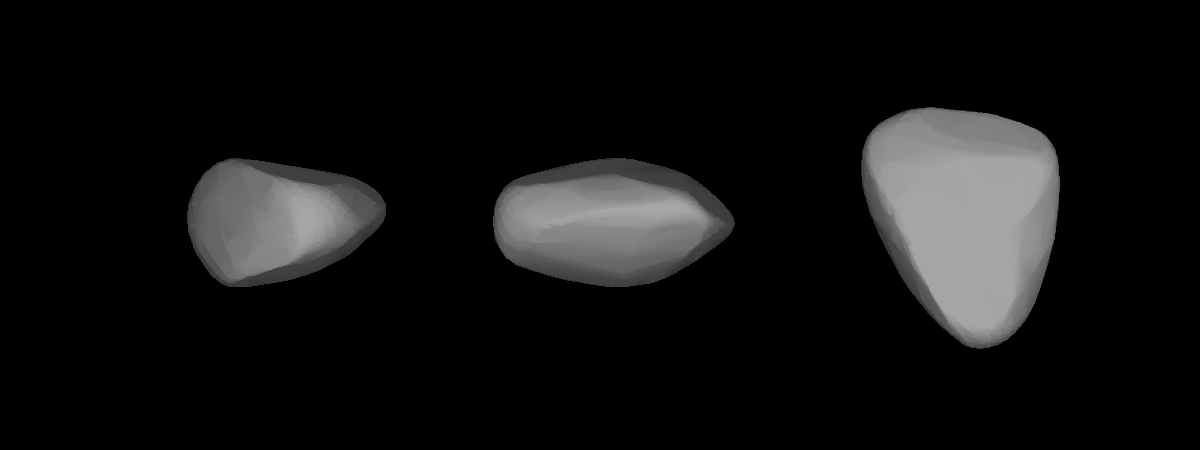
- Lightcurve-based 3D-model of Datura

Discovery
- Discovered by: G. van Biesbroeck
- Discovery site: Yerkes Obs.
- Discovery date: 17 December 1930

Designations
- Pronunciation: /dəˈtʊərə, -tjʊərə/
- Named after: Datura stramonium (flowering plant)
- Alternative designations: 1930 YE · 1953 XF_{1} A913 VB
- Minor planet category: main-belt · (inner); Datura

Orbital characteristics
- Epoch 23 March 2018 (JD 2458200.5)
- Uncertainty parameter 0
- Observation arc: 87.43 yr (31,934 d)
- Aphelion: 2.7003 AU
- Perihelion: 1.7681 AU
- Semi-major axis: 2.2342 AU
- Eccentricity: 0.2086
- Orbital period (sidereal): 3.34 yr (1,220 d)
- Mean anomaly: 122.36°
- Mean motion: 0° 17^{m} 42.36^{s} / day
- Inclination: 5.9859°
- Longitude of ascending node: 97.802°
- Argument of perihelion: 258.98°

Physical characteristics
- Mean diameter: 7.83±0.37 km 8.203±0.152 km
- Synodic rotation period: 3.359 h
- Geometric albedo: 0.288; 0.291
- Spectral type: S
- Absolute magnitude (H): 12.40; 12.50; 12.61±0.12

1270 Datura, provisional designation 1930 YE is a stony asteroid and namesake of the young Datura family, located in the inner regions of the asteroid belt, approximately 8 kilometers (5 miles) in diameter. It was discovered on 17 December 1930, by Belgian–American George Van Biesbroeck at the Yerkes Observatory in Williams Bay, Wisconsin, United States. The S-type asteroid has a rotation period of 3.4 hours. It was named after the flowering plant Datura.

== Orbit and classification ==
Datura is the principal body of the tiny Datura family (411) located within the Flora family region (402), which is one of the largest clans of asteroid families. The Datura family is thought to have recently formed from the collisional destruction of a larger parent body some 450–600 thousand years ago.

The asteroid orbits the Sun in the inner asteroid belt at a distance of 1.8–2.7 AU once every 3 years and 4 months (1,220 days; semi-major axis of 2.23 AU). Its orbit has an eccentricity of 0.21 and an inclination of 6° with respect to the ecliptic. In November 1913, Datura was first observed as A913 VB at Winchester Observatory (799) in Massachusetts, United States. The body's observation arc begins with its official discovery observation at Williams Bay in December 1930.

== Naming ==
This minor planet was named after the Datura, a genus of poisonous flowering plants. The official naming citation was mentioned in The Names of the Minor Planets by Paul Herget in 1955 (H 116).

== Physical characteristics ==
Datura's spectrum is similar to that of an old S-type asteroid, thought to consist of silicate rocks covered with regolith with composition known from ordinary chondrite. This is in agreement with the overall spectral type of both the Datura and the encompassing Flora family.

=== Rotation period ===
In February 2008, a rotational lightcurve of Datura was obtained from photometric observations by Naruhisa Takato using the Subaru Telescope on Hawaii. Lightcurve analysis gave a sidereal rotation period of 3.359±0.001 hours with a brightness amplitude of 0.46 magnitude (U=3). The result is similar to observations by Wisniewski (3.2 h), Vokrouhlický (3.3583 h), and Székely (3.4 h).

In 2013, lightcurve modelling by an international study using photometric data from the US Naval Observatory, the Uppsala Asteroid Photometric Catalogue and the Palmer Divide Observatory, gave a concurring rotation period of 3.358100 hours as well as a spin axis of (0°, 59.0°) in ecliptic coordinates (λ, β). An improved spin-axis determination by Vokrouhlický gave two poles at (60.0°, 76.0°) and (264.0°, 77.0°), respectively.

=== Diameter and albedo ===
According to the surveys carried out by the Japanese Akari satellite and the NEOWISE mission of NASA's Wide-field Infrared Survey Explorer, Datura measures 7.83 and 8.20 kilometers in diameter and its surface has an albedo of 0.291 and 0.288, respectively. The Collaborative Asteroid Lightcurve Link assumes an albedo of 0.24 – taken from 8 Flora, the principal body of the Flora family – and derives a diameter of 8.15 kilometers based on an absolute magnitude of 12.61.
