= 1045 Michela =

Main-belt asteroid

Discovery
- Discovered by: G. van Biesbroeck
- Discovery site: Yerkes Obs.
- Discovery date: 19 November 1924

Designations
- Named after: Micheline van Biesbroeck (discoverer's daughter)
- Alternative designations: 1924 TR · 1953 VB_{2} 1964 XJ · 1976 AL
- Minor planet category: main-belt · (inner); Massalia

Orbital characteristics
- Epoch 23 March 2018 (JD 2458200.5)
- Uncertainty parameter 0
- Observation arc: 63.64 yr (23,246 d)
- Aphelion: 2.7348 AU
- Perihelion: 1.9811 AU
- Semi-major axis: 2.3580 AU
- Eccentricity: 0.1598
- Orbital period (sidereal): 3.62 yr (1,323 d)
- Mean anomaly: 259.96°
- Mean motion: 0° 16^{m} 19.92^{s} / day
- Inclination: 0.2648°
- Longitude of ascending node: 267.71°
- Argument of perihelion: 166.97°
- Known satellites: 1

Physical characteristics
- Mean diameter: 6.104±0.265 km
- Geometric albedo: 0.328±0.077
- Spectral type: SMASS = S
- Absolute magnitude (H): 13.0

1045 Michela, provisional designation 1924 TR, is an stony, binary, Massalian asteroid from the inner regions of the asteroid belt, approximately 6 kilometers (4 miles) in diameter. It was discovered on 19 November 1924, by Belgian–American astronomer George Van Biesbroeck at the Yerkes Observatory in Williams Bay, Wisconsin, United States. The S-type asteroid was named after the discoverer's daughter, Micheline van Biesbroeck.

== Orbit and classification ==
Michela is a member of the Massalia family (404), a very large inner belt asteroid family consisting of stony asteroids. It orbits the Sun in the inner main-belt at a distance of 2.0–2.7 AU once every 3 years and 7 months (1,323 days; semi-major axis of 2.36 AU). Its orbit has an eccentricity of 0.16 and an inclination of 0° with respect to the ecliptic.

The asteroid's observation arc begins with its observation as 1953 VB_{2} at the Goethe Link Observatory in November 1953, or 29 years after its official discovery observation.

== Physical characteristics ==
In the SMASS classification, Michela is a common, stony S-type asteroid, which is also the overall spectral type for Massalian asteroids.

=== Diameter and albedo ===
According to the survey carried out by the NEOWISE mission of NASA's Wide-field Infrared Survey Explorer, Michela measures 6.104 kilometers in diameter and its surface has an albedo of 0.328.

=== Rotation period ===
As of 2018, no rotational lightcurve of Michela has been obtained from photometric observations. The body's rotation period, poles and shape remain unknown.

== Satellite ==
On 9 October 2025, a team of astronomers including D. Gault, D. Herald, C. McPartlin, and C. Weber, discovered a natural satellite orbiting Michela from occultation observations from Goleta, California. The orbital period of this moon is estimated to be 2.2 days, with a diameter of less than 2.2 kilometers. As of 2026, the moon of Michela remains unnamed and undesignated.

== Naming ==
This minor planet was named after Micheline van Biesbroeck, daughter of the discoverer George Van Biesbroeck. The official naming citation was mentioned in The Names of the Minor Planets by Paul Herget in 1955 (H 99).
