= George Van Biesbroeck =

Belgian–American astronomer (1880–1974)

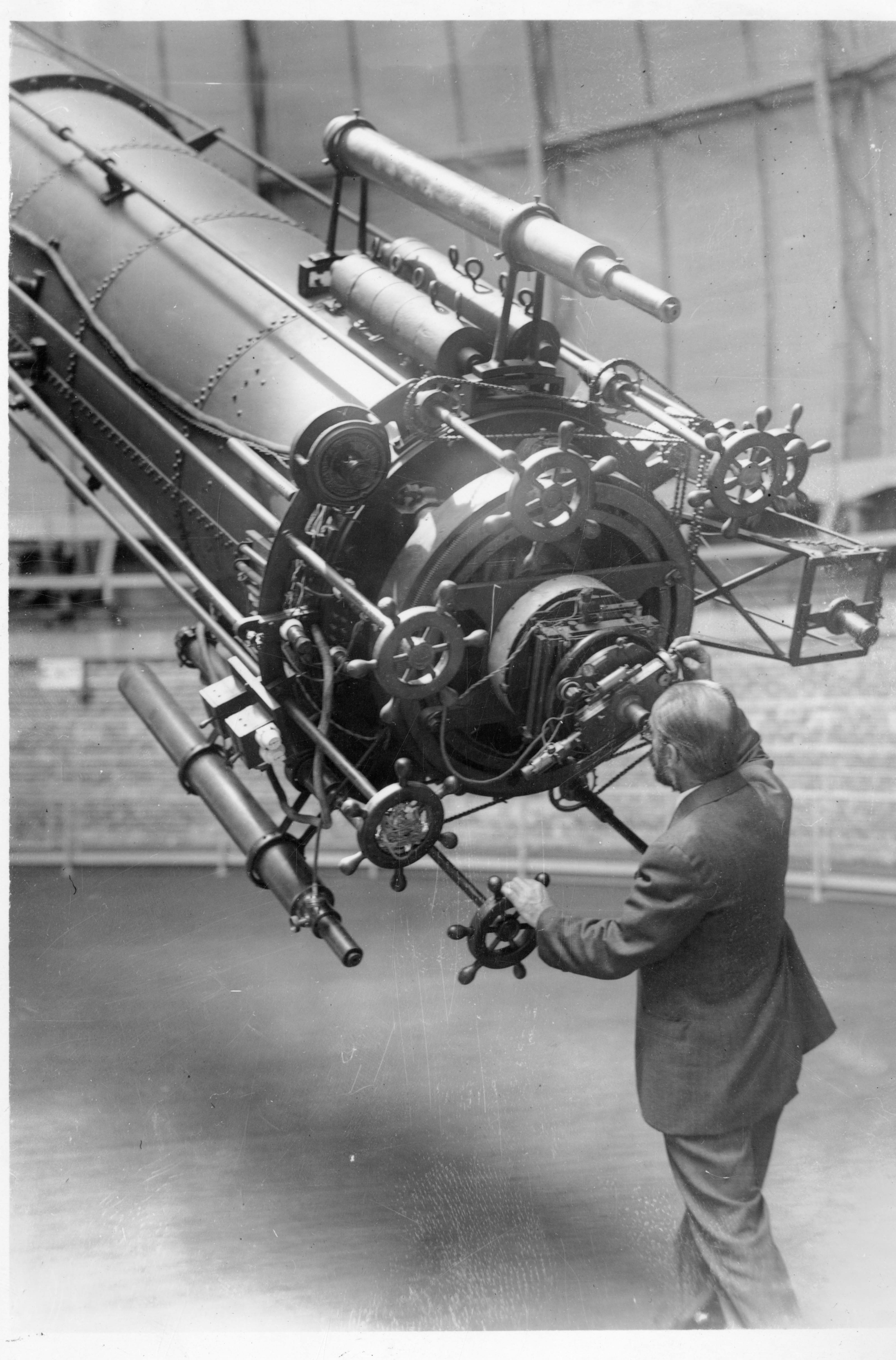
- Born: January 21, 1880; Ghent, Belgium
- Died: February 23, 1974 (aged 94); United States
- Citizenship: United States
- Education: Ghent University
- Known for: Astrophotography; Discoverer of minor planets
- Awards: Valz Prize (1928); James Craig Watson Medal (1957)
- Scientific career
- Fields: Astronomy
- Workplaces: Yerkes Observatory; McDonald Observatory
- Doctoral advisor: Karl Schwarzschild

George A. Van Biesbroeck (or Georges-Achille Van Biesbroeck, /vænˈbiːzbrʊk/, January 21, 1880 – February 23, 1974) was a Belgian–American astronomer. He worked at observatories in Belgium, Germany and the United States. He specialized in the observation of double stars, asteroids and comets. He is notable for his long career as an observational astronomer.

== Life ==
He was born in Ghent, Belgium on January 21, 1880, to a family of artists. At his father's request he pursued, and in 1902, he received, the 1st degree of Civil Engineering Construction and began work as a civil engineer for the Brussels Department of Roads and Bridges. But his true vocation is not there, it was astronomy, and while performing his official duties as a civil engineer he joined volunteers at the Uccle Observatory. In 1904 he left civil engineering behind and joined the staff at the Royal Observatory of Belgium at Uccle.

He then enrolled at Ghent University and obtained a degree in theoretical astronomy. He worked at the Heidelberg Observatory, then at the Potsdam Observatory under the direction of Max Wolf, Karl Schwarzschild and others.

In 1915, as World War I was raging, he was invited to come to work at Yerkes Observatory. He and his family made the dangerous trip across wartime Europe and settled permanently in the United States. He became a U.S citizen in 1922. He then began his work on double stars, comets, asteroids, and variable stars. In 1945 he was forced into retirement at Yerkes at the age of 65. Relieved of administrative duties, he became an even more active observer at Yerkes and at the McDonald Observatory. He made the frequent automobile trips between the observatories in Wisconsin and Texas without complaint.

He participated in numerous physically grueling astronomical expeditions to remote parts of the world throughout the late 1940s and 1950s. In 1952, at age 72, he traveled to Khartoum in Sudan and set up a 20' telescope to confirm Einstein's Theory of Relativity by noting the change in positions of the stars around the Sun during a total eclipse that year. His measurements were in agreement with Einstein's predictions. His travels to Sudan were the subject of a Time magazine article.

== Discoveries ==
He discovered the periodic comet 53P/Van Biesbroeck, as well as two non-periodic comets: C/1925 W1 (Van Biesbroeck 1) and C/1935 Q1 (Van Biesbroeck 2).

He also discovered sixteen asteroids between 1922 and 1939 (see adjunct table), and 43 double stars.

Asteroids discovered: 16
990 Yerkes	November 23, 1922	list
993 Moultona	January 12, 1923	list
1024 Hale	December 2, 1923	list
1027 Aesculapia	November 11, 1923	list
1033 Simona	September 4, 1924	list
1045 Michela	November 19, 1924	list
1046 Edwin	December 1, 1924	list
1079 Mimosa	January 14, 1927	list
1270 Datura	December 17, 1930	list
1312 Vassar	July 27, 1933	list
1464 Armisticia	November 11, 1939	list
2253 Espinette	July 30, 1932	list
2463 Sterpin	March 10, 1934	list
3211 Louispharailda	February 10, 1931	list
3378 Susanvictoria	November 25, 1922	list
3641 Williams Bay	November 24, 1922	list

In 1961 he published the Van Biesbroeck's star catalog. In this he cataloged a number of very faint stars, known by the VB numbers he assigned to them upon discovery. One notable star he discovered was the very small red dwarf secondary star, VB 10, also known as Gliese (GJ) 752B, of the primary star, Wolf 1055 (Gliese (GJ) 752A). This star was unique in that its absolute magnitude of 19 was the lowest of any star then known and still thought to be the lowest possible for any star. VB 10 was given the designation of Van Biesbroeck's Star to honor him for this work and his work with double stars.

== Later life and death ==
In 1963 he came to the Lunar and Planetary Laboratory of the University of Arizona in Tucson Arizona to work under Gerard Kuiper. There he used his practical skills as a land surveyor to site the new Catalina Station now under the direction of Steward Observatory and that now houses the 1.6m Kuiper Telescope. He continued to observe and make contributions to astronomy up to a few months before his death. New scientific papers continued to be published under his name for several years afterward. He died on February 23, 1974, at the age of 94.

== Honors and awards ==
Throughout his long and productive life he received many honors. This is a partial list.

- Gold Medal of the Royal Danish Society of Sciences (1910)
- Donohe Comet Medal of the Astronomical Society of the Pacific (1926)
- Valz Prize of the French Academy of Sciences (1928)
- Burr Prize from the National Geographic Society (1952)
- Price Valzer de l'Académie des Sciences Paris
- James Craig Watson Medal (1957)

=== Objects named for Van Biesbroeck ===
- The main-belt asteroid 1781 Van Biesbroeck
- The lunar crater Van Biesbroeck
- The mountain Mount Van Biesbroeck near the McDonald Observatory
- The star Van Briesboeck's Star, VB 10, from his catalog

=== The George Van Biesbroeck Prize ===
The George Van Biesbroeck Prize, awarded by the American Astronomical Society, is named in his honor. The prize is a lifetime achievement award given to astronomers who have contributed long-term extraordinary or unselfish service to astronomy.
