= 990 Yerkes =

Main-belt asteroid

Discovery
- Discovered by: G. Van Biesbroeck
- Discovery site: Williams Bay
- Discovery date: 23 November 1922

Designations
- Pronunciation: /ˈjɜːrkiːz/
- Alternative designations: 1922 MZ

Orbital characteristics
- Epoch 31 July 2016 (JD 2457600.5)
- Uncertainty parameter 0
- Observation arc: 102.46 yr (37425 days)
- Aphelion: 3.2477 AU (485.85 Gm)
- Perihelion: 2.0916 AU (312.90 Gm)
- Semi-major axis: 2.6696 AU (399.37 Gm)
- Eccentricity: 0.21652
- Orbital period (sidereal): 4.36 yr (1593.2 d)
- Mean anomaly: 216.84°
- Mean motion: 0° 13^{m} 33.456^{s} / day
- Inclination: 8.7872°
- Longitude of ascending node: 353.971°
- Argument of perihelion: 9.4832°

Physical characteristics
- Mean radius: 9.23±0.6 km
- Synodic rotation period: 24.56 h (1.023 d)
- Sidereal rotation period: 24.45 ± 0.05 h
- Geometric albedo: 0.1303±0.018
- Absolute magnitude (H): 11.7

990 Yerkes is a main belt asteroid discovered by Belgian-American astronomer George Van Biesbroeck in 1922, and named after the Yerkes Observatory.

Photometric observations of this asteroid collected during 2009 show a rotation period of 24.45 ± 0.05 hours with a brightness variation of 0.35 ± 0.05 magnitude.
