= 1033 Simona =

Stony Eoan asteroid from the outer regions of the asteroid belt

Discovery
- Discovered by: G. van Biesbroeck
- Discovery site: Yerkes Obs.
- Discovery date: 4 September 1924

Designations
- Named after: Simona Van Biesbroeck (discoverer's daughter)
- Alternative designations: 1924 SM · 1937 CG
- Minor planet category: main-belt · Eos

Orbital characteristics
- Epoch 4 September 2017 (JD 2458000.5)
- Uncertainty parameter 0
- Observation arc: 80.76 yr (29,498 days)
- Aphelion: 3.3538 AU
- Perihelion: 2.6474 AU
- Semi-major axis: 3.0006 AU
- Eccentricity: 0.1177
- Orbital period (sidereal): 5.20 yr (1,898 days)
- Mean anomaly: 268.12°
- Mean motion: 0° 11^{m} 22.56^{s} / day
- Inclination: 10.664°
- Longitude of ascending node: 188.95°
- Argument of perihelion: 217.96°

Physical characteristics
- Dimensions: 19.195±0.194 km 20.247±0.260 km 20.29±6.38 km 23.72±1.70 km 24.71 km (derived)
- Synodic rotation period: 9.6 h 10.07±0.06 h
- Geometric albedo: 0.1050 (derived); 0.12±0.10; 0.125±0.019; 0.1725±0.0201; 0.196±0.041
- Spectral type: S
- Absolute magnitude (H): 11.0 · 11.1

1033 Simona, provisional designation 1924 SM, is a stony Eoan asteroid from the outer regions of the asteroid belt, approximately 20 kilometers in diameter. The asteroid was discovered by George Van Biesbroeck in 1924, who named it after his daughter Simona.

== Discovery ==
Simona was discovered on 4 September 1924, by Belgian–American astronomer George Van Biesbroeck at Yerkes Observatory in Wisconsin, United States. On the following night, it was independently discovered by Soviet astronomer Sergey Belyavsky at Simeiz Observatory on the Crimean peninsula. As an anomaly, the asteroid's astrometric discovery record from 1924, 1924 SM, is missing in the observational history table provided by the Minor Planet Center. The first given observation is from 30 August 1938, made at Heidelberg Observatory.

== Orbit and classifications ==
Simona is a member of the Eos family, a collisional outer-belt family of untypical stony asteroids. It orbits the Sun at a distance of 2.6–3.4 AU once every 5 years and 2 months (1,898 days). Its orbit has an eccentricity of 0.12 and an inclination of 11° with respect to the ecliptic. The body's observation arc begins almost 13 years after its official discovery observation, with its identification 1937 CG at Uccle Observatory in February 1937.

== Physical characteristics ==
=== Lightcurves ===
In September 2007, photometric observations at the Oakley Observatory in Indiana, United States, gave a fragmentary lightcurve with a rotation period of 10.07 hours and a brightness variation of 0.15 magnitude (U=1+).

Another fragmentary lightcurve of Simona was obtained by French amateur astronomer René Roy in August 2012. Lightcurve analysis gave a period of 9.6 hours with an amplitude of 0.02 magnitude (U=n.a.).

=== Diameter and albedo ===
According to the surveys carried out by the Japanese Akari satellite and the NEOWISE mission of NASA's Wide-field Infrared Survey Explorer, Simona measures between 19.195 and 23.72 kilometers in diameter and its surface has an albedo between 0.12 and 0.196. The Collaborative Asteroid Lightcurve Link derives an albedo of 0.1050 and a diameter of 24.71 kilometers based on an absolute magnitude of 11.1.

== Naming ==
This minor planet was named after the discoverer's daughter Simona Titus (née Van Biesbroeck). The official naming citation was published by Paul Herget in The Names of the Minor Planets (H 98).
