= 1024 Hale =

Asteroid

Discovery
- Discovered by: G. van Biesbroeck
- Discovery site: Yerkes Obs.
- Discovery date: 2 December 1923

Designations
- Named after: George Ellery Hale (American astronomer)
- Alternative designations: YO 13, A923 XC
- Minor planet category: main-belt · (outer) background

Orbital characteristics
- Epoch 23 March 2018 (JD 2458200.5)
- Uncertainty parameter 0
- Observation arc: 89.22 yr (32,587 d)
- Aphelion: 3.5095 AU
- Perihelion: 2.2230 AU
- Semi-major axis: 2.8663 AU
- Eccentricity: 0.2244
- Orbital period (sidereal): 4.85 yr (1,772 d)
- Mean anomaly: 173.74°
- Mean motion: 0° 12^{m} 11.16^{s} / day
- Inclination: 16.090°
- Longitude of ascending node: 58.856°
- Argument of perihelion: 307.94°

Physical characteristics
- Mean diameter: 28.46±6.70 km 41.28 km (derived); 43.274±0.148 km 45.964±17.12 km 47.33±8.98 km 47.674±0.893 km 48.18±0.78 km 51.37±15.55 km
- Synodic rotation period: 16.0±0.1 h
- Geometric albedo: 0.0260±0.0240; 0.027±0.047; 0.0289±0.0057; 0.03±0.02; 0.044±0.002; 0.045±0.007; 0.0496 (derived); 0.10±0.04
- Spectral type: SMASS = Ch · C C (SDSS-MFB)
- Absolute magnitude (H): 10.60 · 10.70; 10.78 · 10.8; 10.83 · 11.00

1024 Hale, provisional designation YO 13, is a carbonaceous background asteroid from the outer regions of the asteroid belt, approximately 45 kilometers (28 miles) in diameter. The asteroid was discovered on 2 December 1923, by Belgian–American astronomer George Van Biesbroeck at the Yerkes Observatory in Wisconsin, United States. It was named for American astronomer George Ellery Hale. The dark C-type asteroid may have a rotation period of 16 hours.

== Orbit and classification ==
Hale is a non-family asteroid from the main belt's background population. It orbits the Sun in the outer asteroid belt at a distance of 2.2–3.5 AU once every 4 years and 10 months (1,772 days; semi-major axis of 2.87 AU). Its orbit has an eccentricity of 0.22 and an inclination of 16° with respect to the ecliptic. The body's observation arc begins at Yerkes Observatory with its first recorded observation in December 1928, or five years after its official discovery observation.

== Physical characteristics ==
Hale has been characterized as a carbonaceous C-type asteroid by Pan-STARRS' photometric survey and by the SDSS-MFB (Masi Foglia Binzel). In the SMASS classification it is a "hydrated" Ch-subtype.

=== Rotation period ===
In January 2013, a first rotational lightcurve of Hale was obtained from photometric observations by Michael S. Alkema at the Elephant Head Observatory (G35) in Arizona, United States. Analysis of the fragmentary lightcurve gave a rotation period of 16.0 hours with a brightness amplitude of 0.10 magnitude (U=1+). As of 2018, no secure period has been obtained.

=== Diameter and albedo ===
According to the surveys carried out by the Japanese Akari satellite and the NEOWISE mission of NASA's Wide-field Infrared Survey Explorer, Hale measures between 28.46 and 51.37 kilometers in diameter and its surface has an albedo between 0.0260 and 0.10.

The Collaborative Asteroid Lightcurve Link derives an albedo of 0.0496 and a diameter of 41.28 kilometers based on an absolute magnitude of 10.8.

== Naming ==
This minor planet was named after George Ellery Hale (1868–1938), a prolific American astronomer and pioneer of a new generation of large aperture telescopes, namely the 60-inch Hale and the 100-inch Hooker telescope at Mount Wilson Observatory, as well as the 200-inch Hale telescope at Palomar Observatory. He founded the discovering Yerkes and Mount Wilson observatories and was their first director. Hale also founded The Astrophysical Journal and invented the spectroheliograph, which allowed to take monochromatic images of the Sun. The official naming citation was mentioned in The Names of the Minor Planets by Paul Herget in 1955 (H 98).
