= Saini Simona =

Tuvaluan civil servant

Saini Simona is a Tuvaluan civil servant, Director of Women Affairs in Tuvalu. In 2010 she spoke out in support of a proposal to have seats reserved for women in the Parliament of Tuvalu.
