= Yerkes Observatory =

Astronomical observatory in Wisconsin, US

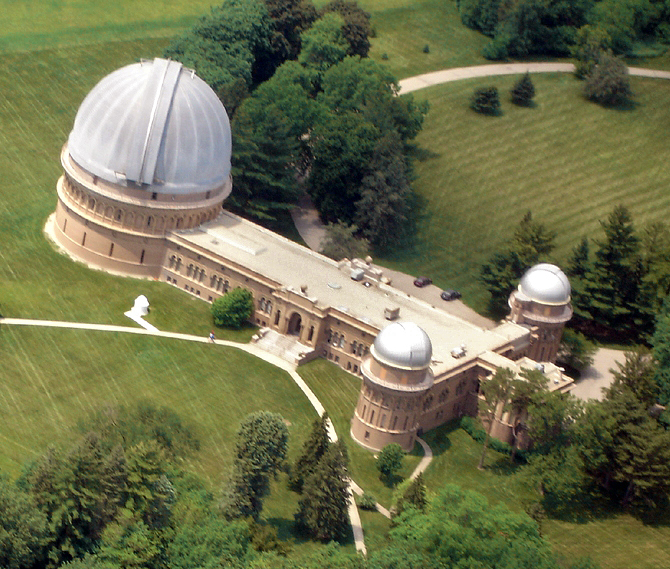
- Alternative names: 754 YE
- Named after: Charles Yerkes
- Organization: Yerkes Future Foundation
- Observatory code: 754
- Location: Williams Bay, Walworth County, Wisconsin
- Coordinates: 42°34′13″N 88°33′24″W
- Altitude: 334 m (1,096 ft)
- Established: 1892
- Website: yerkesobservatory.org
- Architect: Henry Ives Cobb

Telescopes
- 40-inch (102 cm): refractor Dedicated 1897
- 40-inch (102 cm): Ritchey–Chrétien reflector Since 1968
- 24-inch (61 cm): Cassegrain reflector Boller & Chivens
- 10-inch (25 cm): Cassegrain reflector
- 7-inch (18 cm): Schmidt camera
- 12 inch: Kenwood Refractor (former)
- 23.5 inch: The "Two Foot" (former)
- Related media on Commons

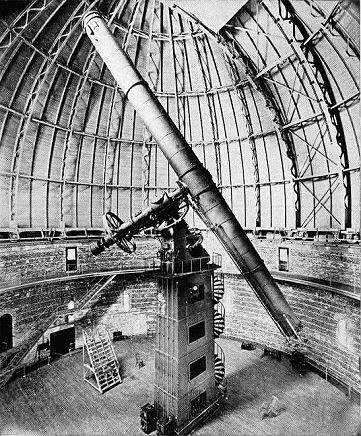
1897 photo of the 40 in (100 cm) refractor at the Yerkes Observatory.

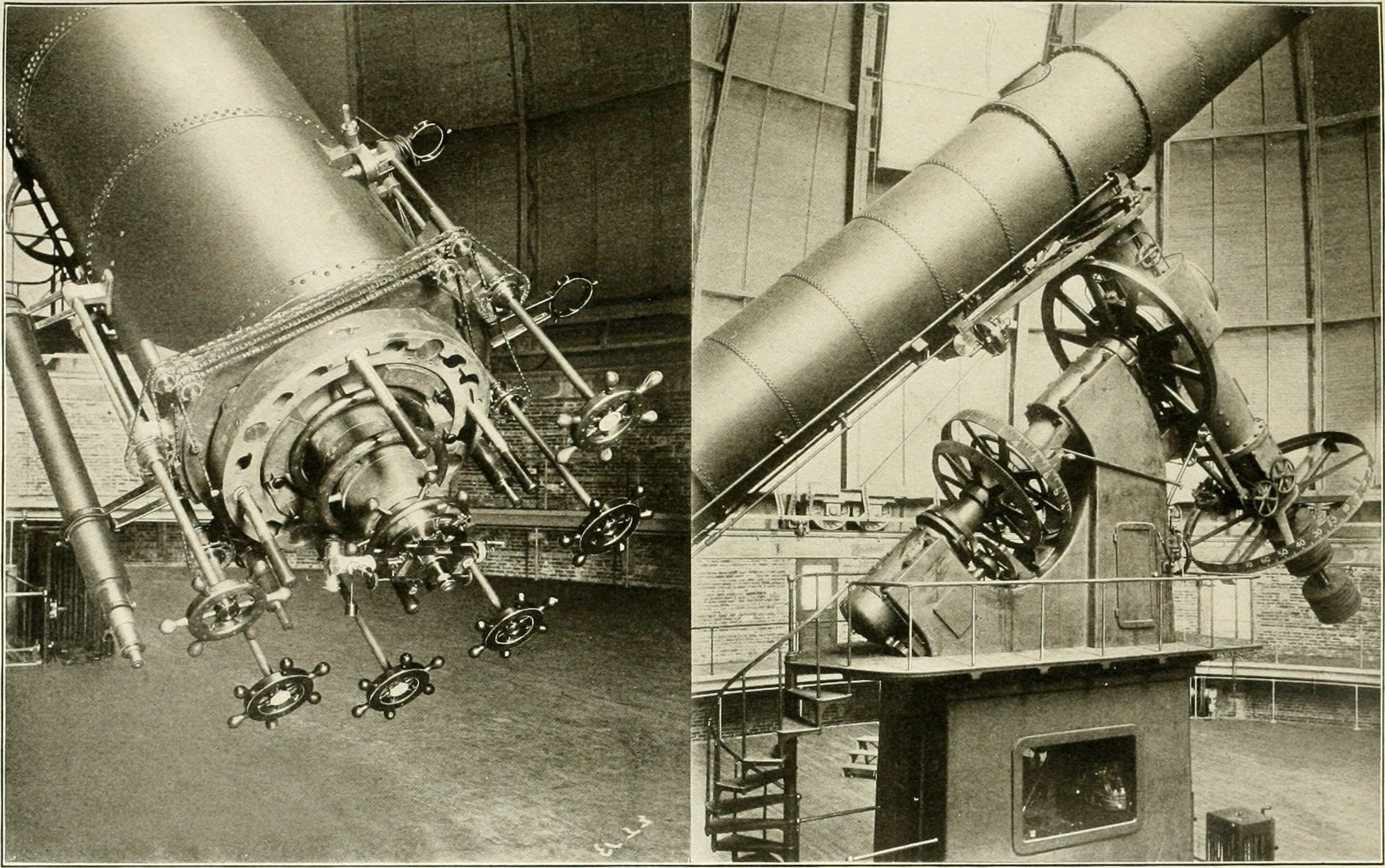
Telescope controls of the 40 in (100 cm) refractor

The Yerkes Observatory (/ˈjɜːrkiːz/ YUR-keez) is an astronomical observatory in Williams Bay, Wisconsin, United States. Founded in 1897, it houses the world's largest refracting telescope in the world, with a doublet-lens aperture of 40 inches (100 cm). It was initially operated by the University of Chicago Department of Astronomy and Astrophysics from its founding until 2018, after which ownership was transferred to the non-profit organization Yerkes Future Foundation (YFF) in May 2020, which began heavy restoration and renovation of the historic buildings and grounds. Yerkes re-opened for public tours and programming in May 2022.

The observatory — known as "the birthplace of modern astrophysics" — was founded in 1892 by astronomer George Ellery Hale and financed by businessman Charles T. Yerkes. It represented a shift in the thinking about observatories, from their being mere housing for telescopes and observers, to the early-20th-century concept of observation equipment integrated with laboratory space for physics and chemistry analysis.

The observatory's main dome houses a 40 inch aperture (100 cm) doublet lens refracting telescope, the largest refractor ever successfully used for astronomical observation. The Swedish Solar Telescope in the Canary Islands has a slightly larger 43-in diameter (109 cm) lens but only 39-in (99 cm) clear aperture and is primarily dedicated to solar observations. There are two smaller domes at Yerkes in which are currently mounted 41-inch (104 cm) and 24-inch (60 cm) reflecting telescopes. The observatory also holds a collection of over 170,000 photographic plates.

The Yerkes 40-inch was the largest refracting-type telescope in the world when it was dedicated in 1897. Another large telescope of this period was the Great Melbourne Telescope, which was a reflector. In the United States, the Lick refractor had just a few years earlier come online in 1888 in California with a 36-inch (91 cm) lens.

Prior to its installation, the telescope on its enormous German equatorial mount was shown at the World's Columbian Exhibition in Chicago, Illinois during the time the observatory was under construction.

The observatory was a center for serious astronomical research for more than 100 years. By the 21st century, however, the historic telescope had reached the end of its research life. The University of Chicago closed the observatory in October 2018. In November 2019, it was announced that the university would transfer Yerkes Observatory to the non-profit Yerkes Future Foundation (YFF). The transfer of ownership took place on May 1, 2020.

== Telescopes ==
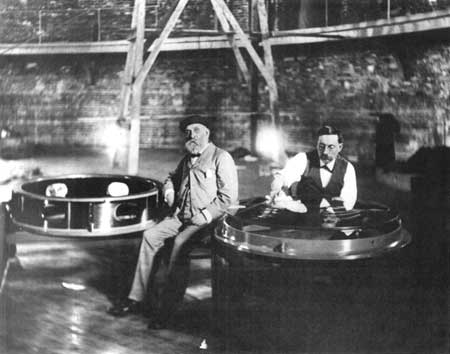
Alvan Graham Clark polishes the big Yerkes objective lens in 1896

In the 1860s Chicago became home of the largest telescope in America, the Dearborn 18 1/2 in (47 cm) refractor. It was later surpassed by the U.S. Naval Observatory's 26 inch, which would go on to discover the moons of Mars in 1877. There was an extraordinary increase of larger telescopes in finely furnished observatories in the late 1800s. In the 1890s various forces came together to establish an observatory of art, science, and superlative instruments in Williams Bay, Wisconsin.

The telescope was surpassed by the Harvard College Observatory, 60 in (152 cm) reflector less than ten years later, although it remained a center for research for decades afterwards. In addition to the large refractor, Yerkes also conducted a great amount of Solar observations.

=== Background ===
Yerkes Observatory's 40-inch (102 cm) refracting telescope has a doublet lens produced by the optical firm Alvan Clark & Sons and a mounting by the Warner & Swasey Company. It was the largest refracting telescope used for astronomical research. In the years following its establishment, the bar was set and tried to be exceeded; an even larger demonstration refractor, the Great Paris Exhibition Telescope of 1900, was exhibited at the Paris Universal Exhibition of 1900.

However, this was not much of a success, was dismantled, and did not become part of an active University observatory. The mounting and tube for the 40-inch telescope was exhibited at the 1893 World's Columbian Exposition in Chicago before being installed in the observatory. The grinding of the lens was completed later.

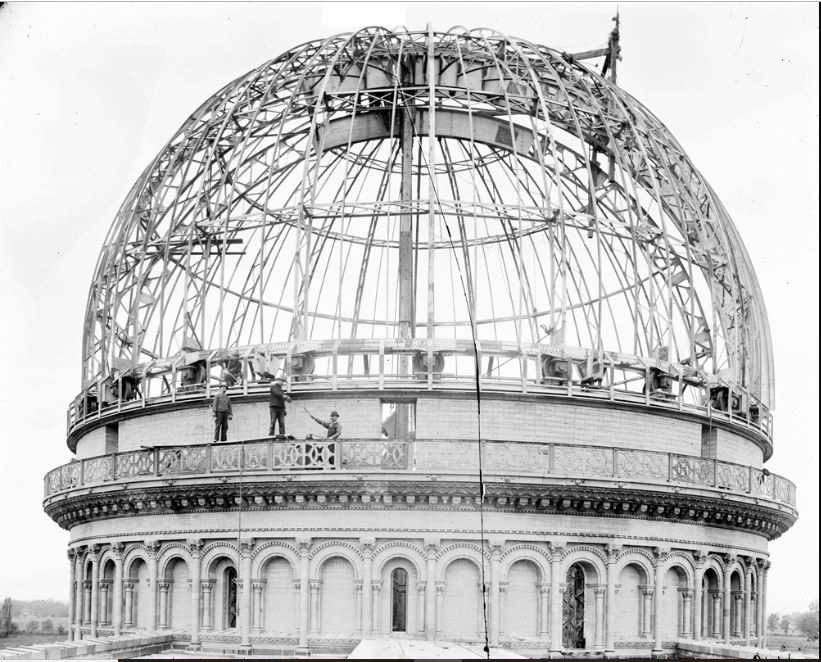
Three workers on the skeleton of Yerkes Observatory's great dome viewed from the roof. c.1896

=== 40-inch aperture refractor ===
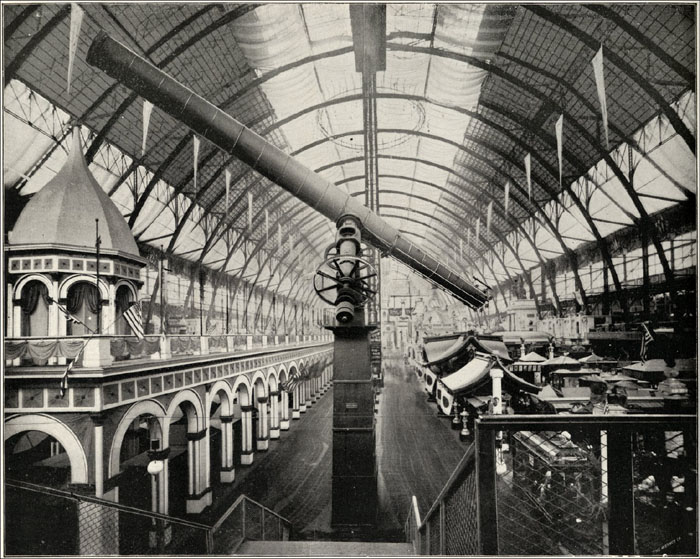
The Yerkes Great refractor mounted at the 1893 World's Fair in Chicago

The glass blanks for what would become Yerkes Great Refractor were made in Paris, France by Mantois and delivered to Alvan Clark & Sons in Massachusetts where they were completed. Clark then made what would be the largest telescope lens ever crafted and this was mounted to an Equatorial mount made by Warner & Swasey for the observatory. The telescope has an aperture of 40 inches (~102 cm) and focal length of 19.3 meters, giving it a focal ratio of f/19.

The lens, an achromatic doublet which has two sections to reduce chromatic aberration, weighed 225 kilograms, and was the last big lens made by Clark before he died in 1897. Glass lens telescopes had a good reputation compared to speculum metal and silver on glass mirror telescopes, which had not quite proven themselves in the 1890s. For example, the Leviathan of Parsonstown was a 1.8 meter telescope with a speculum metal mirror, but getting good astronomical results from this technology could be difficult. Another large telescope of this period was the Great Melbourne Telescope in Australia, also a metal mirror telescope.

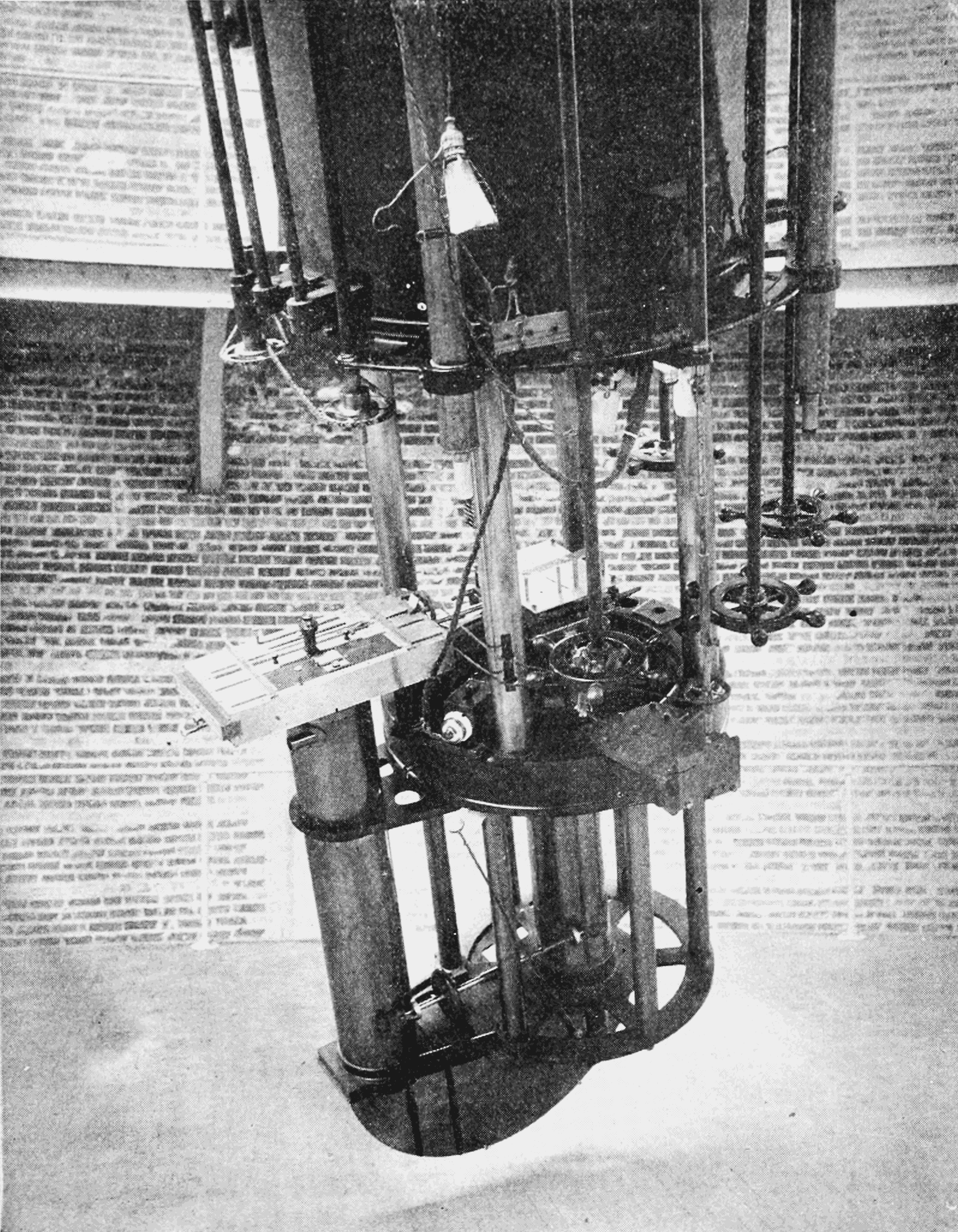
Spectroheliograph instrument mounted on the 40-inch refractor in 1904

Some of the instruments for the 40-inch refractor (circa 1890s) were:

- Filar Micrometer
- Solar spectrograph
- Spectroheliograph
- Stellar spectrograph
- Photoheliograph
- Photographic plate camera

The 40-inch refractor was modernized in the late 1960s with electronics of the period. The telescope was painted, the manual controls were removed, and electric operations were added at that time. This included nixie tube displays for its operation.

=== 41-inch reflector ===
In the late 1960s a 40-inch reflecting telescope was added to the observatory complex. The 41 inch was finished by 1968, with overall installation completed by December 1967 and the optics in 1968. While the telescope has a clear aperture of 40-inches, the mirror's physical diameter measures 41-inches leading to the telescope usually being called the "41 inch" to avoid confusion with the 40 inch refractor. The mirror is made from low-expansion Cer-Vit material.

The launch instruments for the 41 inch reflector included:

- Image tube spectrograph
- Photoelectric photometer
- Photoelectric spectrophotometer
- Photographic plate camera

The reflector is of the Ritchey-Chretien optical design. The 41-inch helped pioneer the field of adaptive optics.

=== Additional instruments and equipment ===
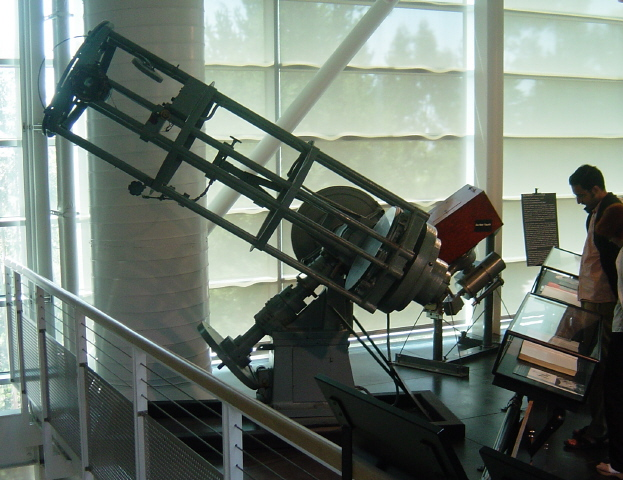
The old Yerkes 24 inch (2 foot telescope) reflecting telescope, now in a museum

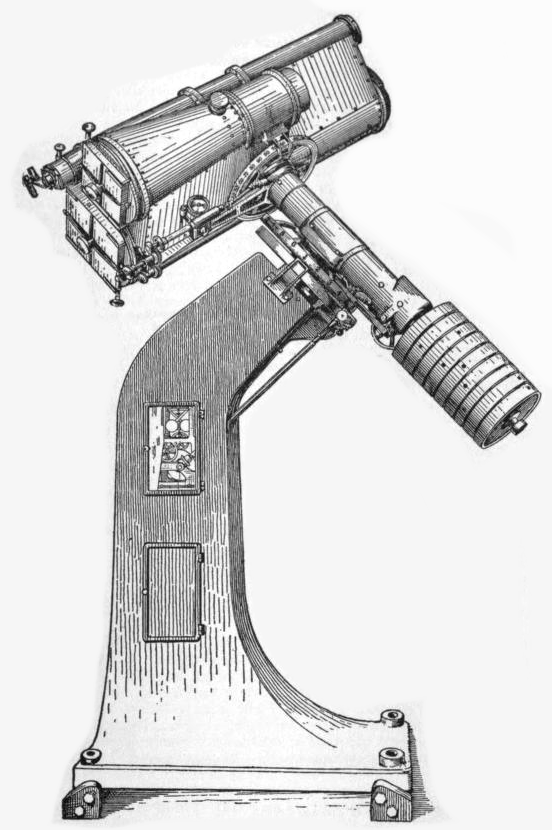
Diagram of the Bruce astrograph

A 12-inch refractor was moved to Yerkes from Kenwood Observatory in the 1890s. Two other telescopes planned for the observatory in the 1890s were a 12-inch aperture refractor and a 24-inch reflecting telescope. There was a heliostat mirror and a meridian room for a transit instrument.

A two-foot aperture reflecting telescope was manufactured at the observatory itself. The clear aperture of the telescope was actually 23.5 inches. The glass blanks were cast in France by Saint Gobain Glass Works, and then were figured (polished into telescopic shape) at Yerkes Observatory. The 'Two foot telescope' used a roughly seven foot long skeleton truss made of aluminum.

The Observatory had an IBM 1620 computer, which it used for three years. This was replaced with an IBM 1130 computer in the 1960s.

A microphotometer built by Gaertner Scientific Corporation was delivered to the observatory in February 1968.

A 24-inch reflecting telescope with Cassegrain optical setup, 24-inch (61 cm) clear aperture, and an off-axis equatorial mount by Boller & Chivens was contracted in the early 1960s under direction of observatory director W. Albert Hiltner This telescope was installed in one of the smaller Yerkes domes and was used for visitor programs.

A 7-inch (18 cm) diameter aperture Schmidt camera was also at Yerkes Observatory.

The Snow Solar Telescope was first established at Yerkes Observatory and moved to California in 1904. A major difficulty of these telescopes was dealing with heat from the Sun. It was built horizontally but led to a vertical solar tower design afterwards.

Another instrument located at the observatory was the Bruce photographic telescope. The telescope had two objective lenses for photography, one doublet of 10-inches aperture and another of 6¼-inches; in addition there was a 5-inch guide scope for visual viewing. The telescope was constructed from funds donated in 1897. The telescope was mounted on a custom designed equatorial, the result of collaboration between Yerkes and Warner & Swasey, especially designed to offer an uninterrupted tracking for long image exposures. Two images on glass plates were usually taken simultaneously, one a 12 x 12-inch plate with the 10-inch camera and the other an 8 x 10-inch plate with the 6¼-inch camera.

The Bruce astrograph lenses were made by Brashear with Mantois of Paris glass blanks, and the lenses were completed by the year 1900. The overall telescope was not completed until 1904, where it was installed in its own dome at Yerkes.

The astronomer Edward Emerson Barnard's work with the Bruce telescope, with his niece Mary R. Calvert who worked as his assistant and computer, lead to the publication of a sky atlas using images taken with the instrument, and also a catalog of dark nebulae known as the Barnard catalog.

== Dedication ==
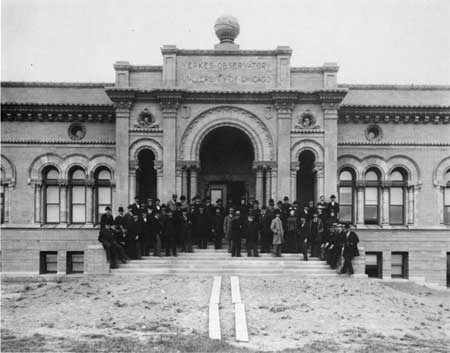
Group photo from the dedication in October 1897

The Observatory was dedicated on October 21, 1897, and there was a large party with university staff, astronomers, and scientists.

Before the dedication, a conference of astronomers and astrophysicists was hosted at Yerkes Observatory, taking place on October 18–20, 1897. This is noted as a precursor to the founding of the American Astronomical Society.

Although dedicated in 1897, it was founded in 1892. Also, astronomical observations had started in the summer of 1897 before the dedication.

== Research and observations ==
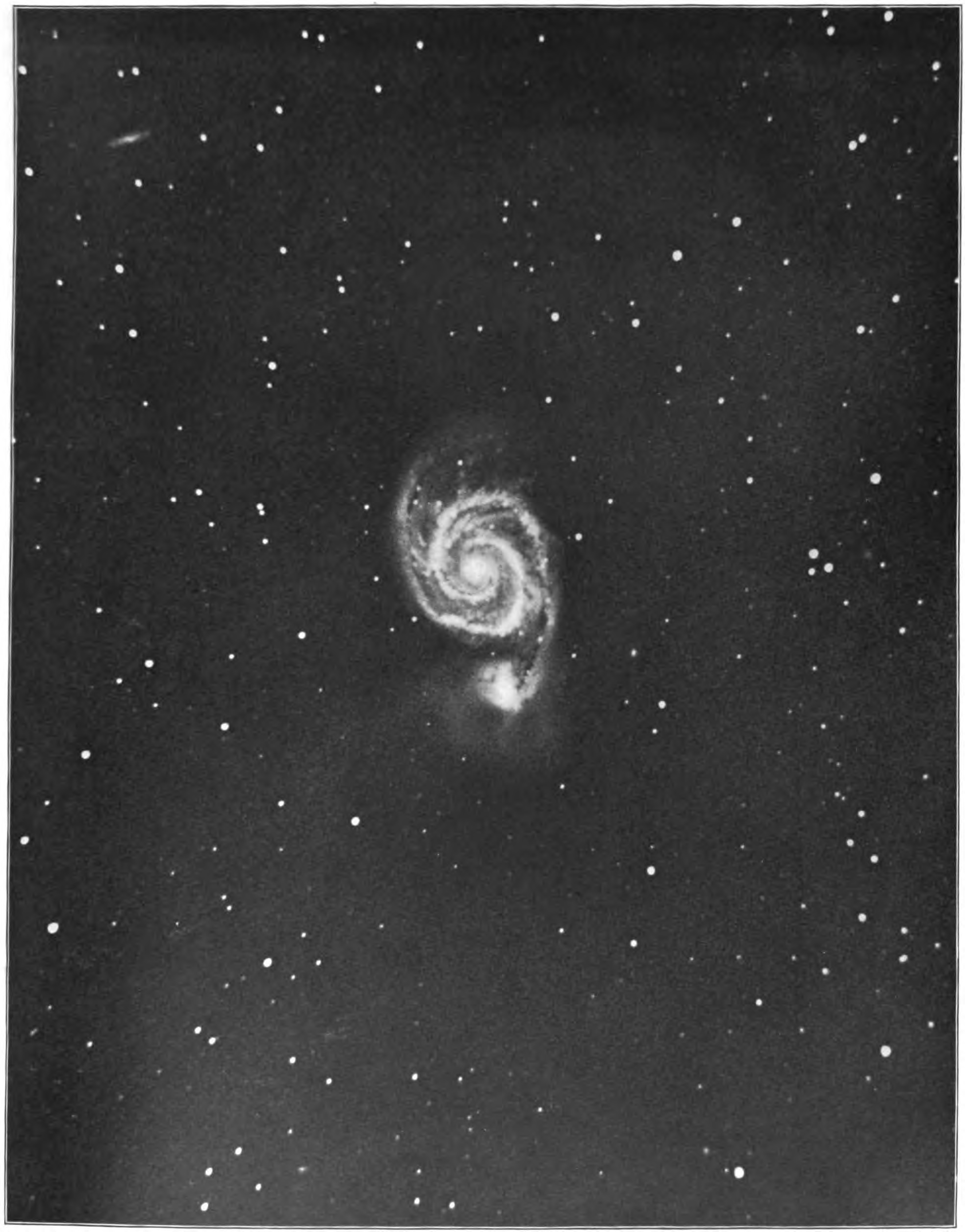
A photo of the Messier 51 galaxy taken on June 3, 1902, at the Yerkes Observatory

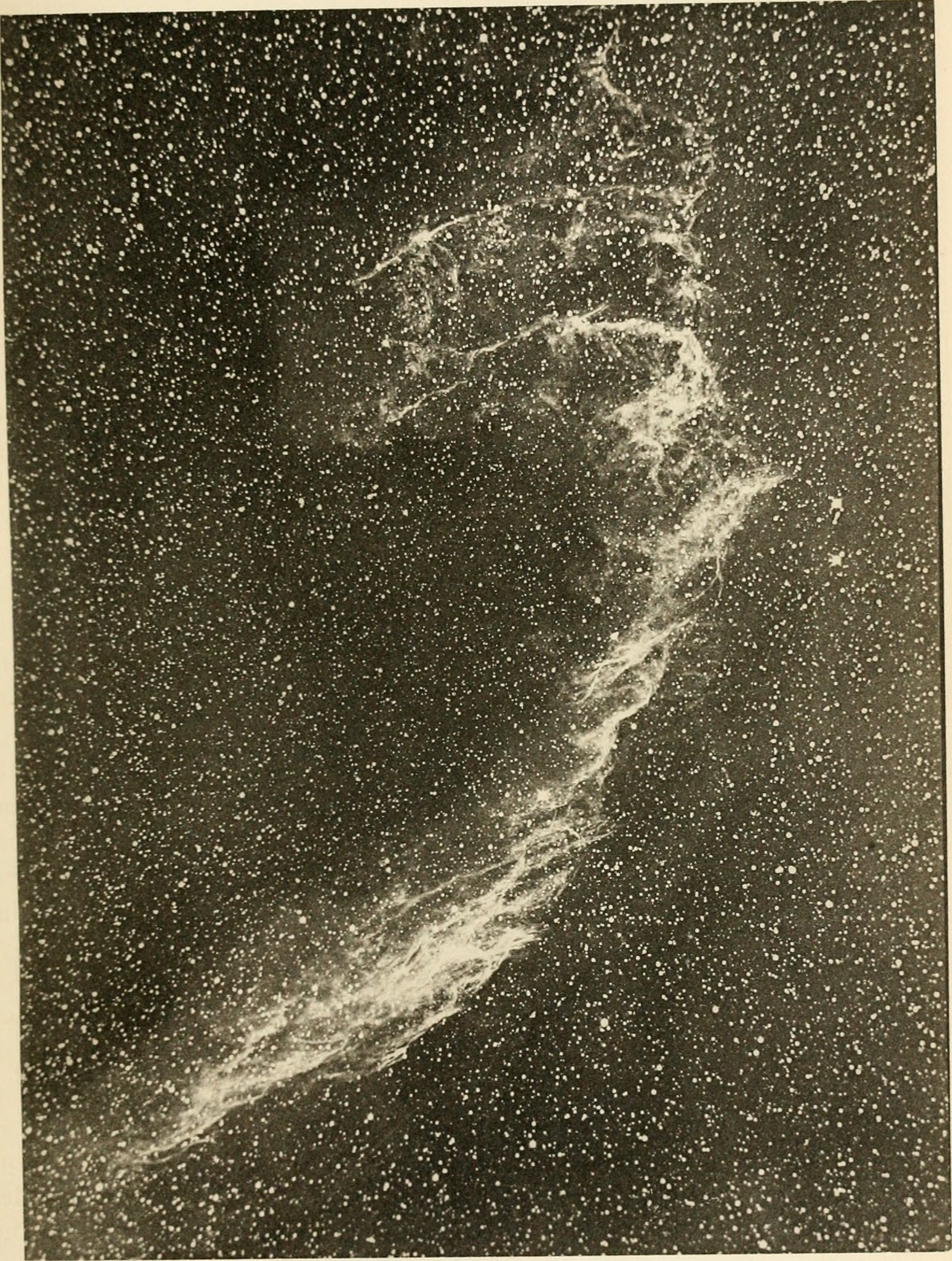
George Ritchey image of what he called the Great Nebula in Cygnus (In modern times the Veil Nebula); taken with the two-foot reflecting telescope with 3 hours exposure

Research conducted at Yerkes includes work on the interstellar medium, globular cluster formation, infrared astronomy, and near-Earth objects. The University of Chicago also maintained an engineering center in the observatory, dedicated to building and maintaining scientific instruments. In 2012, the engineers completed work on the High-resolution Airborne Wideband Camera (HAWC), part of the Stratospheric Observatory for Infrared Astronomy (SOFIA). Researchers also use the Yerkes collection of over 170,000 archival photographic plates that date to the 1890s.

The editorial offices for The Astrophysical Journal were located at Yerkes Observatory until the 1960s. In June 1967, Yerkes Observatory hosted the to-date largest meeting of the American Astronomical Society, with talks on over 200 papers.

The Yerkes spectral classification (aka MKK system) was a system of stellar spectral classification introduced in 1943 by William Wilson Morgan, Philip C. Keenan, and Edith Kellman from Yerkes Observatory. This two-dimensional (temperature and luminosity) classification scheme is based on spectral lines sensitive to stellar temperature and surface gravity, which are related to luminosity (the Harvard classification is based on surface temperature). Later, in 1953, after some revisions of lists of standard stars and classification criteria, the scheme was named the Morgan–Keenan classification, or MK.

Research work of the Yerkes Observatory has been cited over 10,000 times.

In 1899, observations of Neptune's moon Triton were published, with data recorded using the Warner & Swasey micrometer. In 1898 and 1899, Neptune was at opposition.

In 1906, a star catalog of over 13,600 stars was published. Also, there was important work on Solar research in the early years, which was of interest to Hale. He went on to the Snow Solar Telescope at Mount Wilson in California. This was first operated at Yerkes and then moved to California.

An example of an asteroid discovered at Yerkes is 1024 Hale, provisional designation A923 YO_{13}, a carbonaceous background asteroid from the outer regions of the asteroid belt, approximately 45 km (28 mi) in diameter. The asteroid was discovered on 2 December 1923 by Belgian–American astronomer George Van Biesbroeck at Yerkes Observatory, and it was named for astronomer George Ellery Hale of Yerkes Observatory fame. Some additional examples include 990 Yerkes, 991 McDonalda, and 992 Swasey around this time; many more minor planets would be discovered at the observatory in the following decades.

== Notable staff and visitors ==
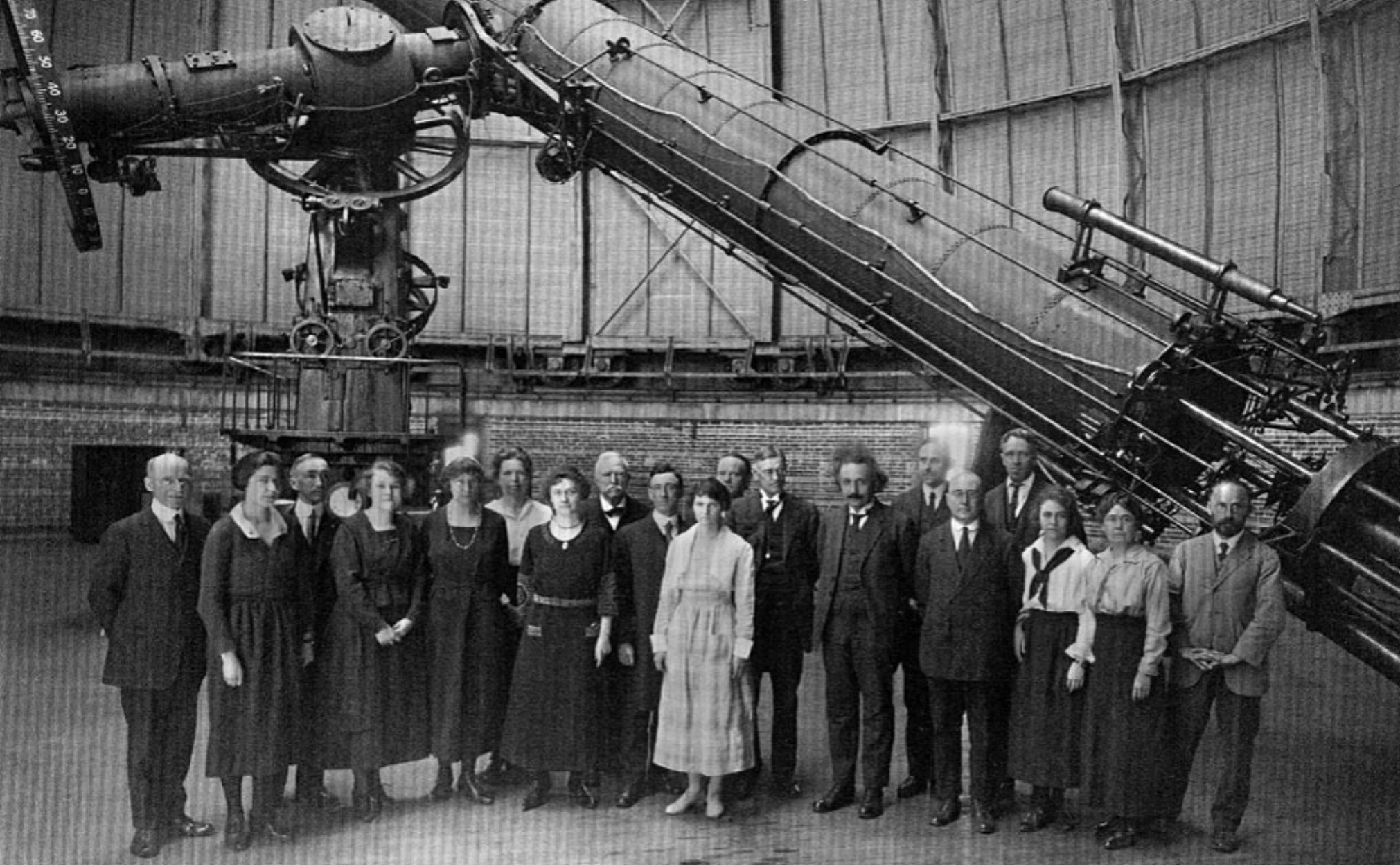
The 40-inch (1.02 m) Refractor backdrops Einstein's visit to the Observatory in May 1921

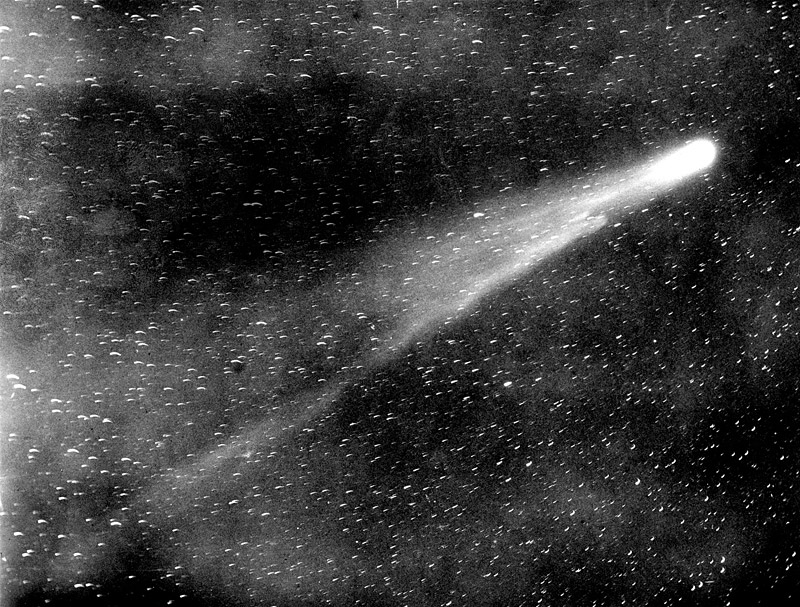
Halley's Comet, June 1910 taken by Yerkes Observatory

Notable astronomers who conducted research at Yerkes include Albert Michelson, Edwin Hubble (who did his graduate work at Yerkes and for whom the Hubble Space Telescope was named), Subrahmanyan Chandrasekhar (for whom the Chandra Space Telescope was named), Ukrainian-American astronomer Otto Struve, Dutch-American astronomer Gerard Kuiper (noted for theorizing the Kuiper belt, home to dwarf planet Pluto), Nancy Grace Roman, NASA's first Chief of Astronomy (who did her graduate work at Yerkes), and the twentieth-century popularizer of astronomy Carl Sagan. In 2022, astronomer Amanda Bauer was the first astronomer hired by the Yerkes Future Foundation, which took over the observatory, its restoration and operation from the University of Chicago in 2020. She came to Yerkes from the Vera Rubin Telescope, then under construction in Chile, and was appointed the first-ever Montgomery Foundation Deputy Director and Head of Science and Education.

Visitors:

- Albert Einstein (May 1921)
- John Mather, senior astrophysicist at the NASA Goddard Space Flight Center and Nobel laureate in Physics (2023)
- Hillary Rodham Clinton, former U.S. Secretary of State (2022)
- Grace Stanke, Miss America 2023, nuclear engineering student (2022)
- Tracy K. Smith, Pulitzer prize-winner, author, former US Poet Laureate (2023)
- Kate Rubins, astronaut and first human to sequence DNA in space (2023)
- Edward (Ed) Lu, astronaut (2024)

Directors of Yerkes Observatory:

- 2021–curr – Dennis Kois
- 2012–2018 – Doyal Al Harper (2nd time)
- 2001–2012 – Kyle M. Cudworth
- 1989–2001 – Richard G. Kron
- 1982–1989 – Doyal Al Harper
- 1974–1982 – Lewis M. Hobbs
- 1972–1974 – William Van Altena
- 1966–1972 – Charles Robert O'Dell
- 1963–1966 – William Hiltner
- 1960–1963 – William W. Morgan
- 1957–1960 – Gerard P. Kuiper (2nd time)
- 1950–1957 – Bengt Strömgren
- 1947–1950 – Gerard P. Kuiper
- 1932–1947 – Otto Struve
- 1903–1932 – Edwin B. Frost
- 1897–1903 – George Ellery Hale

== The 2005 proposed development ==
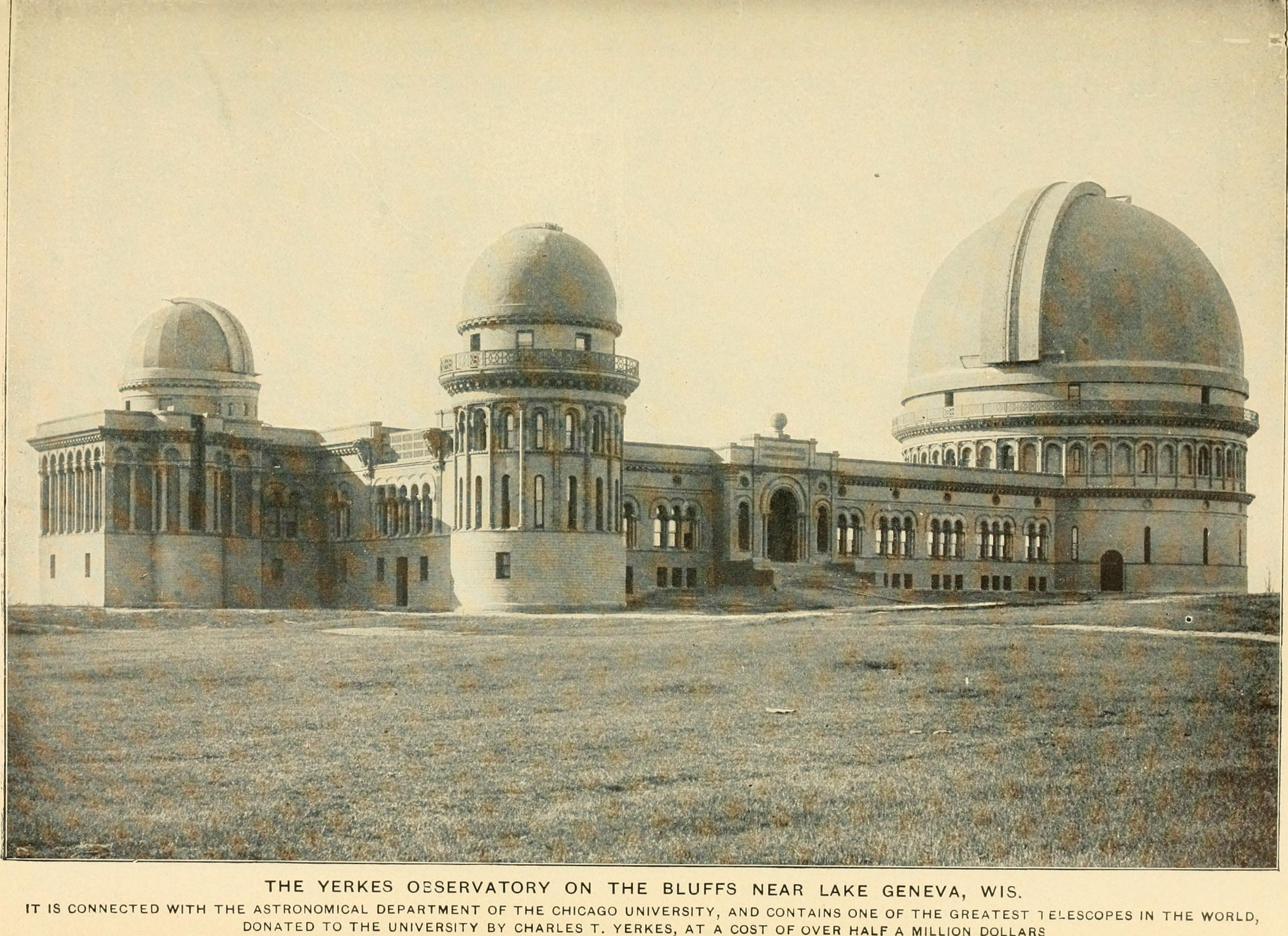
A year 1900 book makes note of the Observatory

In 2006, the University of Chicago announced plans to sell the observatory and its land to a developer. Under the plan, a 100-room resort with a large spa operation and attendant parking and support facilities was to be located on the 9-acre (36,000 m^{2}) virgin wooded Yerkes land on the lakeshore—the last such undeveloped, natural site on Geneva Lake's 21 mi (34 km) shoreline. About 70 homes were to be developed on the upper Yerkes property surrounding the historic observatory. These grounds had been designed more than 100 years previously by John Charles Olmsted, the nephew and adopted son of famed landscape architect Frederick Law Olmsted. Ultimately, Williams Bay's refusal to change the zoning from education to residential caused the developer to abandon its development plans. In view of the public controversy surrounding the development proposals, the university suspended these plans in January 2007.

== Closure and Transfer to the Yerkes Future Foundation ==
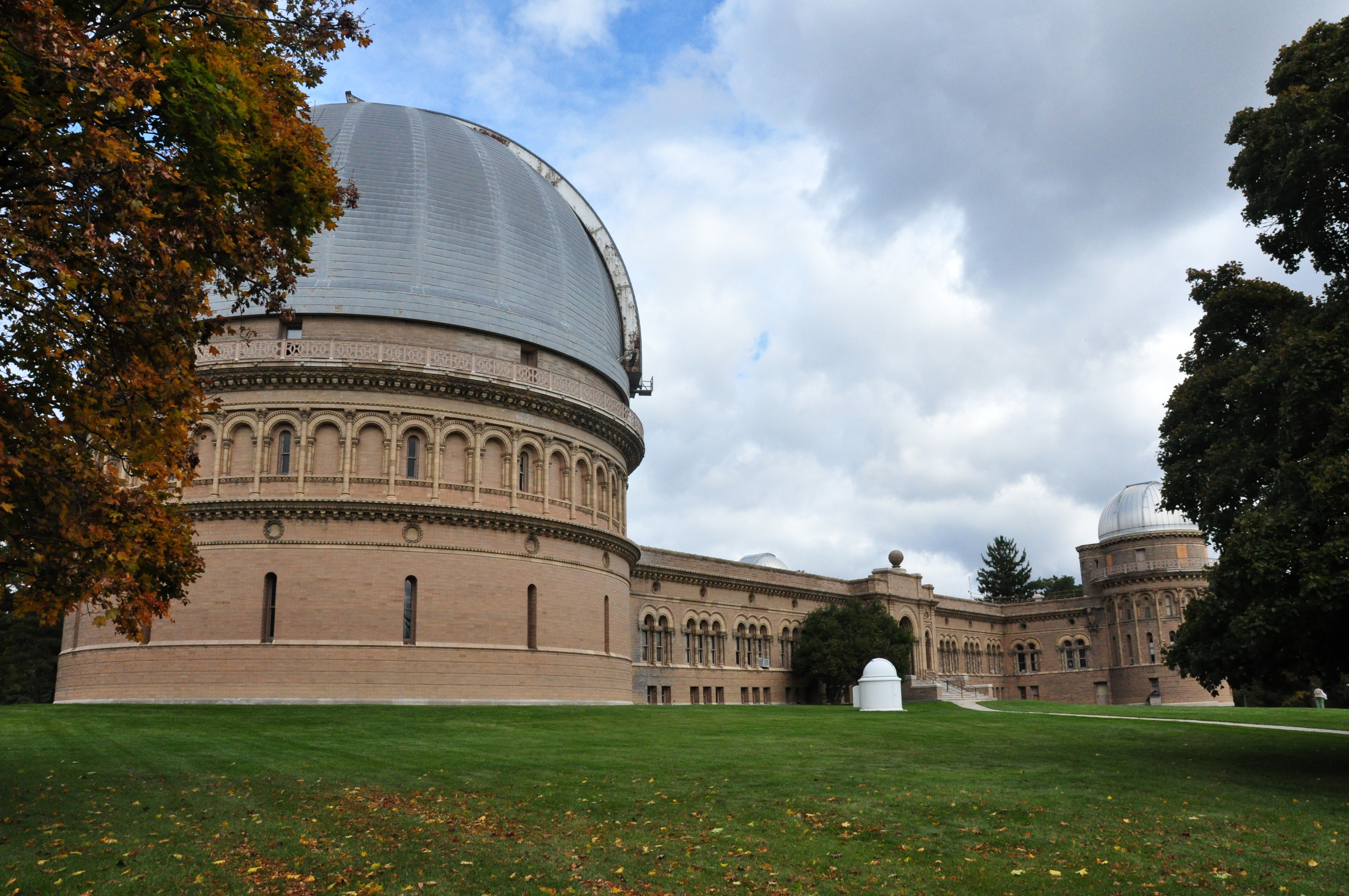
Yerkes in 2009

In March 2018, the University of Chicago announced that it would no longer operate the observatory after October 1, 2018, and would be seeking a new owner. In May 2018, the Yerkes Future Foundation, a group of local residents, submitted an expression of interest to the University of Chicago with a proposal that would seek to maintain public access to the site and continuation of the educational programs. Transfer of operation to a successor operator was not arranged by the end of August, and the facility was closed to the general public on October 1. Some research activities continued at the Observatory, including access and use of the extensive historical glass plate archives at the site. Yerkes education and outreach staff formed a nonprofit organization – GLAS – to continue their programs at another site after the closing.

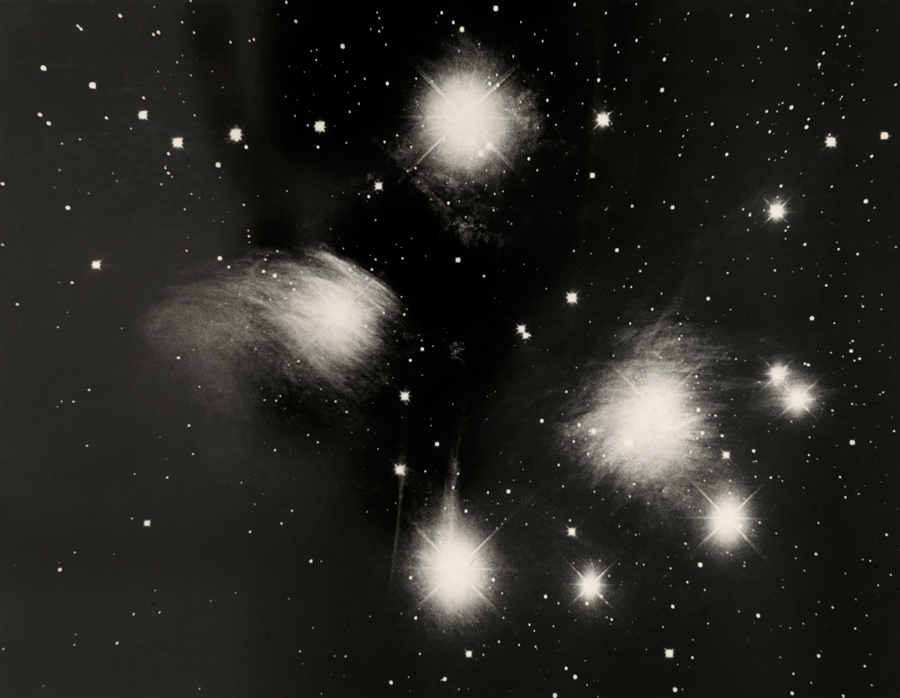
A photograph from Yerkes Observatory depicts nebulae in the Pleiades, August 1919.

In May 2019, the university continued to negotiate with interested parties on Yerkes's future, primarily with the Yerkes Future Foundation. It was announced in November 2018 that a sticking point had been the need to include the Yerkes family in the discussions. Mr. Yerkes's agreement in making his donation to the university transfers ownership "To have and to hold unto the said Trustees [of the University of Chicago] and their successors so long as they shall use the same for the purpose of astronomical investigation, but upon their failure to do so, the property hereby conveyed shall revert to the said Charles T. Yerkes or his heirs at law, the same as if this conveyance had never been made."

In 2022, the site was re-opened to visitors.

In 2023, Amanda Bauer was interviewed and demonstrated the use of the telescope, partly restored. Full restoration was expected to take 10 more years.

== Gargoyle sculptures, location, and landscaping ==
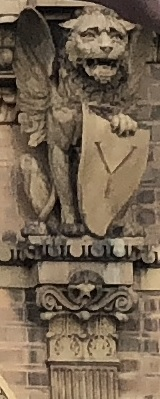
A Yerkes Gargoyle sculpture on the Observatory building

The Observatory grounds and buildings are renowned for more than the Great Refractor, but also sculptures and architecture. In addition, the landscaping is also famed for its design work by Olmsted. The observatory building was designed by architect Henry Ives Cobb, and has been referred to as being in the Beaux Arts style. The building is noted for its blend of styles and rich ornamentation featuring a variety of animal and mythological designs.

On the building there are various carvings including Lion gargoyle designs. There are also sculptures to represent various people that oversaw or supported construction of the telescope and the facility. The location is noted for a good and pleasant location by Lake Geneva. Although it does not have a high-altitude as preferred by modern observatories, it does have good weather, and is a considerable distance from the light and pollution of Chicago.

In 1888, Williams Bay had a railway terminal added by Chicago & North Western Railroad; this provided access from Chicago, and is one factor that increased the site's development in the following decades.

The landscape was designed by the same firm that designed New York Central park, the firm of Frederick Law Olmsted, and the grounds were noted at one point for having multiple state record trees. The tree plan design was developed in the 1910s under design from the Olmsted firm and with support of the observatory Director; the grounds included the following types of trees at that time: white fir, yellowwood tree, golden rain tree, European beech, fernleaf beech, Japanese pagoda tree, littleleaf linden, Kentucky coffeetree, ginkgo, buckthorn, cut-leaf beeches, and chestnut trees.

The original landscape plan was not completed by the 1897 dedication, and there was grading and construction of gravel roads under direction of the Olmsted design as late as 1908.

== Contemporaries on debut of the Great Yerkes Refractor ==
Legend
- Reflector (Metal mirror) or unknown
- Glass Reflector (Silver on glass mirror)
- Refractor (Lens)

A major contemporary for the Yerkes was the well-regarded 36-inch Lick refractor near San Jose, California. The Yerkes, although just 4 inches in aperture larger, meant an increase of 23% in light-gathering ability. Both telescopes had achromatic doublets by Alvan Clark.

The 19th century saw a transition in large telescope construction from refractor type to reflector type, with metal-film-coated glass mirrors tending to be used instead of difficult, older-style metal mirrors. The Yerkes was perhaps the greatest of the great refractors, the largest astronomical instrument in the traditional style of the 19th century refractor-based observatories.

The Yerkes was not only the largest refractor, but was tied for being the largest telescope in the world with Paris Observatory reflector (48 inch, 122 cm) when it became operational in 1896.

Name/Observatory	Aperture cm (in)	Type	Location	Extant or Active
Leviathan of Parsonstown	183 cm (72")	reflector – metal	Birr Castle; Ireland	1845–1908*
Great Melbourne Telescope	122 cm (48")	reflector – metal	Melbourne Observatory, Australia	1878
National Observatory, Paris	120 cm (47")	reflector – glass	Paris, France	1875–1943
Yerkes Observatory	102 cm (40")	achromat	Williams Bay, Wisconsin, USA	1897
Meudon Observatory 1m	100 cm (39.4")	reflector – glass	Meudon Observatory/ Paris Observatory	1891
James Lick telescope, Lick Observatory	91 cm (36")	achromat	Mount Hamilton, California, USA	1888
Crossley Reflector (Lick Observatory)	91.4 cm (36")	reflector – glass	Mount Hamilton, California, USA	1896

*Note the Leviathan of Parsonstown was not used after 1890

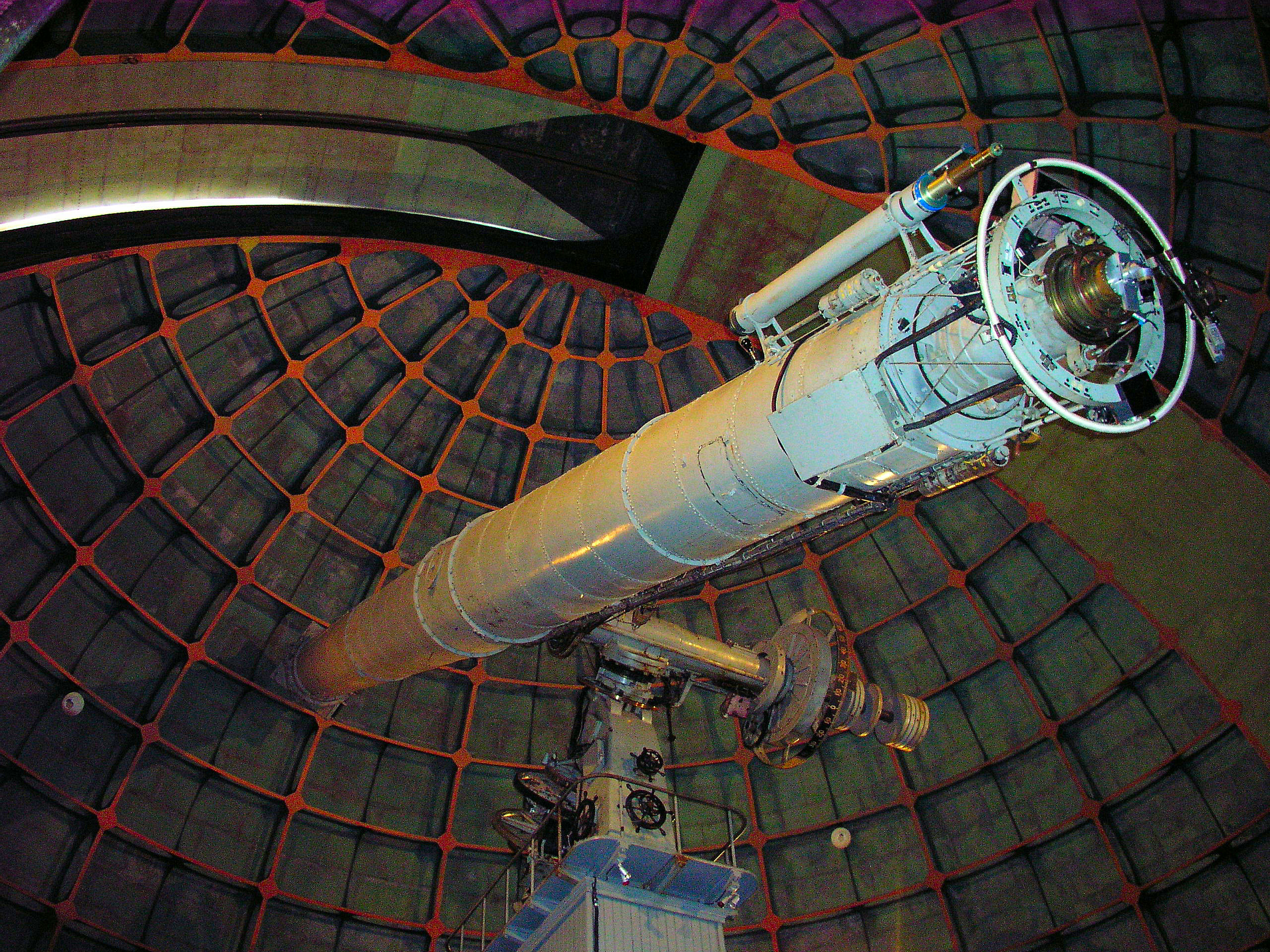
The Lick telescope in California was a 91 cm aperture and debuted in 1888.

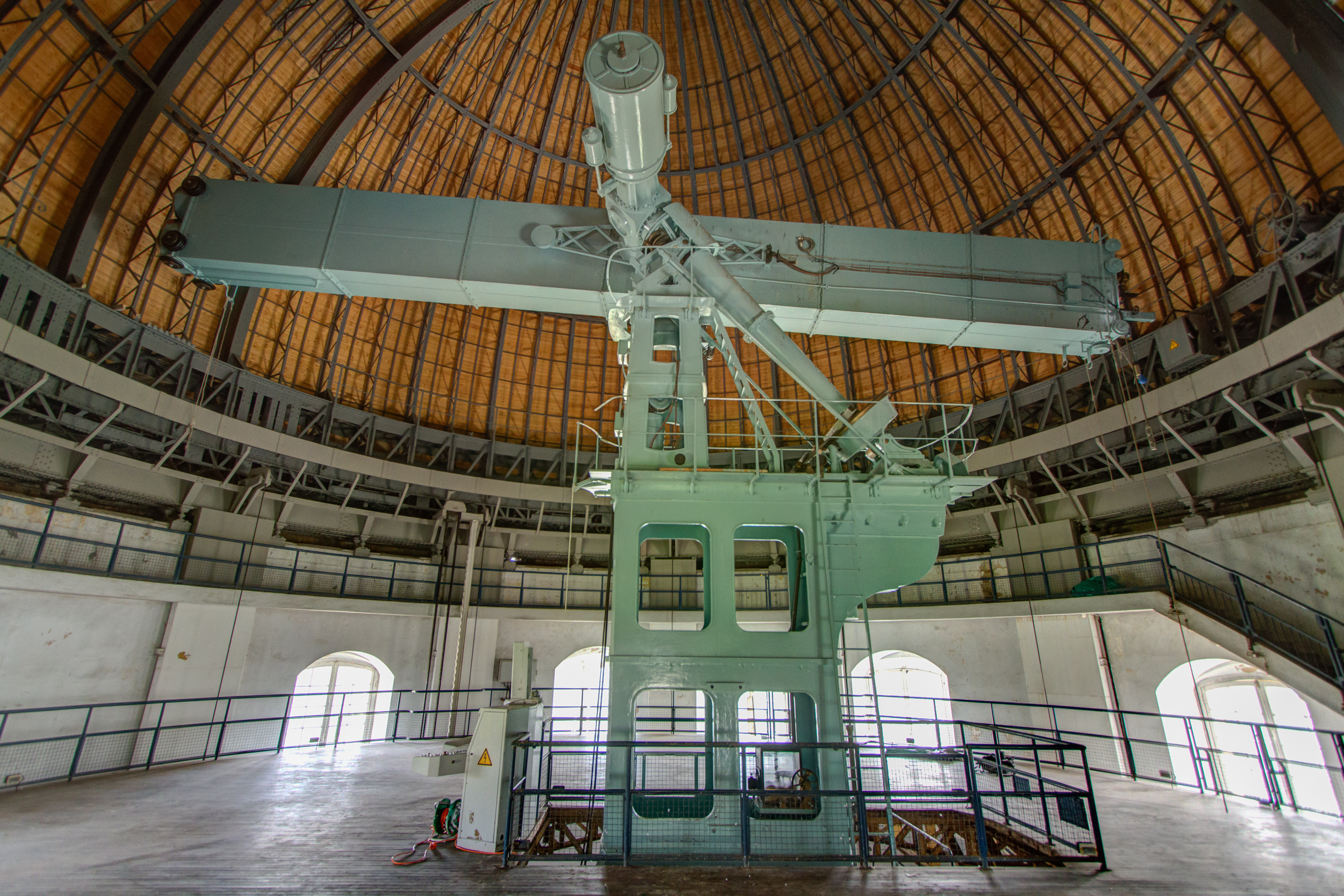
The Grande Lunette of Meudon Observatory (France), was a double refractor with both an 83 cm and 62 cm on one shaft and came online in 1891.

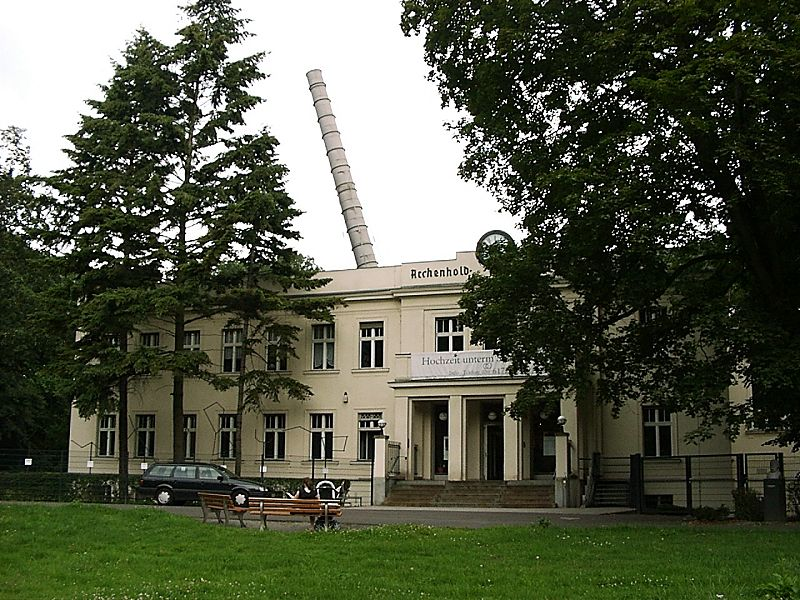
Germany's Himmelskanone did away with a dome (the telescope tube extends above the observatory in this image) but was quite long, also debuting in 1896 like Yerkes.

Understanding atmosphere and trends of telescope building of the late 19th century puts the choice of a large refractor in perspective. Although there were some very large reflectors, the speculum mirrors they relied on reflected about 2/3 of the light and had high upkeep. A major breakthrough came in the middle of the 19th century with a technique for coating glass with a metal film. This process (silver on glass) eventually lead to some bigger glass reflectors. Silvering has its own issues, in that coating must be reapplied usually every 2 years or so depending on conditions, and also it must be done very thinly so as to not affect the optical properties of the mirror.

A large glass reflector (122 cm diameter glass mirror) was established in Paris by 1876, but problems with figuring of that mirror meant that the Paris Observatory's 122 cm telescope was not used and did not have a good reputation for viewing. The potential of metal coated glass became more apparent with A. A. Common's 36 inch reflecting telescope by 1878 (this won an astrophotography award).

The Warner and Swasey equatorial mount was shown in Chicago at the 1893 Colombia Exhibition, before it was moved to the Observatory.

Largest telescopes (all types) in 1910

Name/Observatory	Aperture cm (in)	Type	Location	Extant or Active
Harvard 60-inch Reflector	1.524 m (60")	reflector – glass	Harvard College Observatory, USA	1905–1931
Hale 60-Inch Telescope	1.524 m (60")	reflector – glass	Mt. Wilson Observatory; California, USA	1908
National Observatory, Paris	122 cm (48")	reflector – glass	Paris, France	1875–1943
Great Melbourne Telescope	122 cm (48")	reflector – metal	Melbourne Observatory, Australia	1878
Yerkes Observatory	102 cm (40")	achromat	Williams Bay, Wisconsin, USA	1897
Meudon Observatory 1m	100 cm (39.4")	reflector – glass	Meudon Observatory/ Paris Observatory	1891
James Lick telescope, Lick Observatory	91 cm (36")	achromat	Mount Hamilton, California, USA	1888
Crossley Reflector (Lick Observatory)	91.4 cm (36")	reflector – glass	Mount Hamilton, California, USA	1896

== Legacy ==
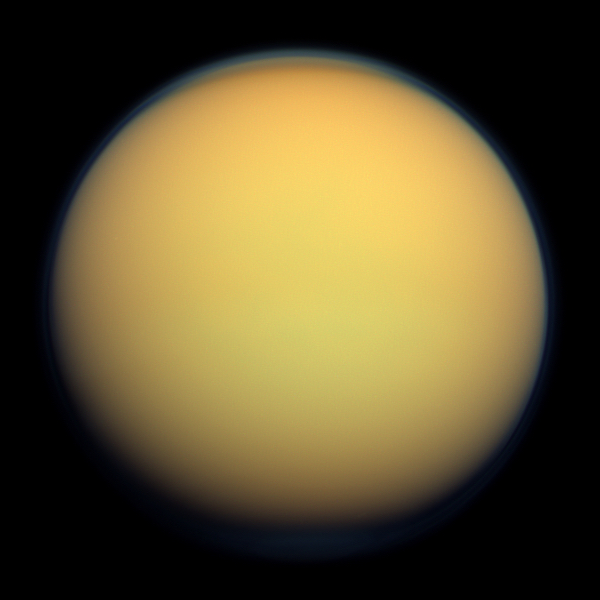
The atmosphere of Saturn's moon Titan was discovered by Kuiper while working at the Yerkes Observatory—a moon that would later be visited by Voyager 1 and also the Cassini-Huygens spacecraft.

By 1905, the largest telescope in the World was the Harvard 60-inch Reflector ( 1.524 m 60″) at Harvard College Observatory, USA. Then in 1908, Mount Wilson Observatory matched that size with a 60-inch reflector of their own, and throughout the 20th century, increasingly larger reflectors would be established, aided also by refinements to mirror technology—vapor-deposited aluminum on low-thermal expansion glass, pioneered for the 200 inch (5 meter) Hale telescope of 1948.

In the latter years of the 20th century, space observatories also marked a major advance, and somewhat less than a century after Yerkes, the Hubble Space Telescope, with a 2.4 meter reflector, was launched. Small refractors remain popular for astronomical photography, although issues with chromatic aberration were never really entirely solved for the lens. (Isaac Newton solved this with the reflecting design, although the refractors are not without their merits.)

Great advancements such as astrophotography and the discovery of nebulas and different types of stars provided a major advance in this period. The importance of finely crafted mounts matched to a large aperture, harnessing the power of the basic equations of the telescopes design to bring the heavens into closer, brighter examination increased humankind's understanding of space and Earth's place in the Galaxy. Among the accomplishments, Kuiper discovered that Saturn's moon Titan has an atmosphere.

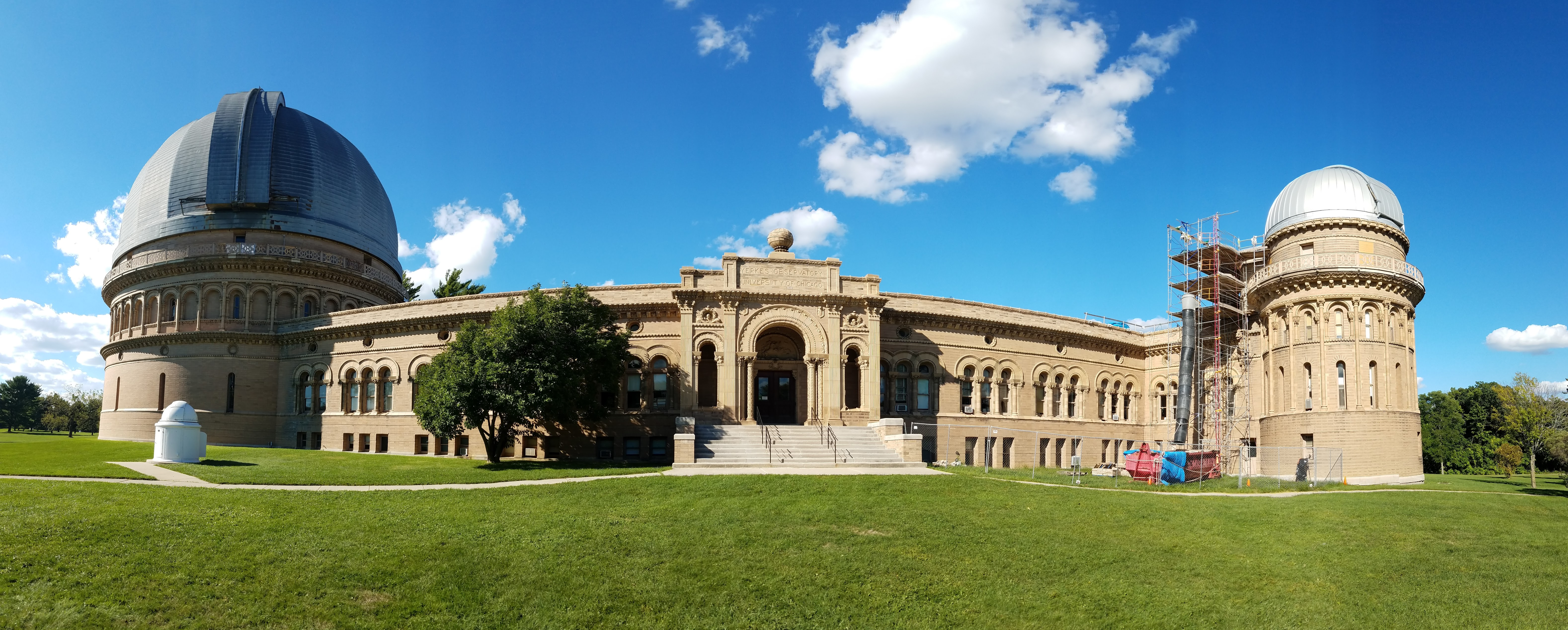
Panorama of the observatory building, 2016

== See also ==
- List of largest optical refracting telescopes
- List of astronomical observatories
- List of largest optical telescopes in the 20th century
- List of largest optical telescopes in the 19th century
- List of telescope types
- Yerkes 41-inch reflector
