= List of national parks of Kenya =

Map of protected areas in Kenya

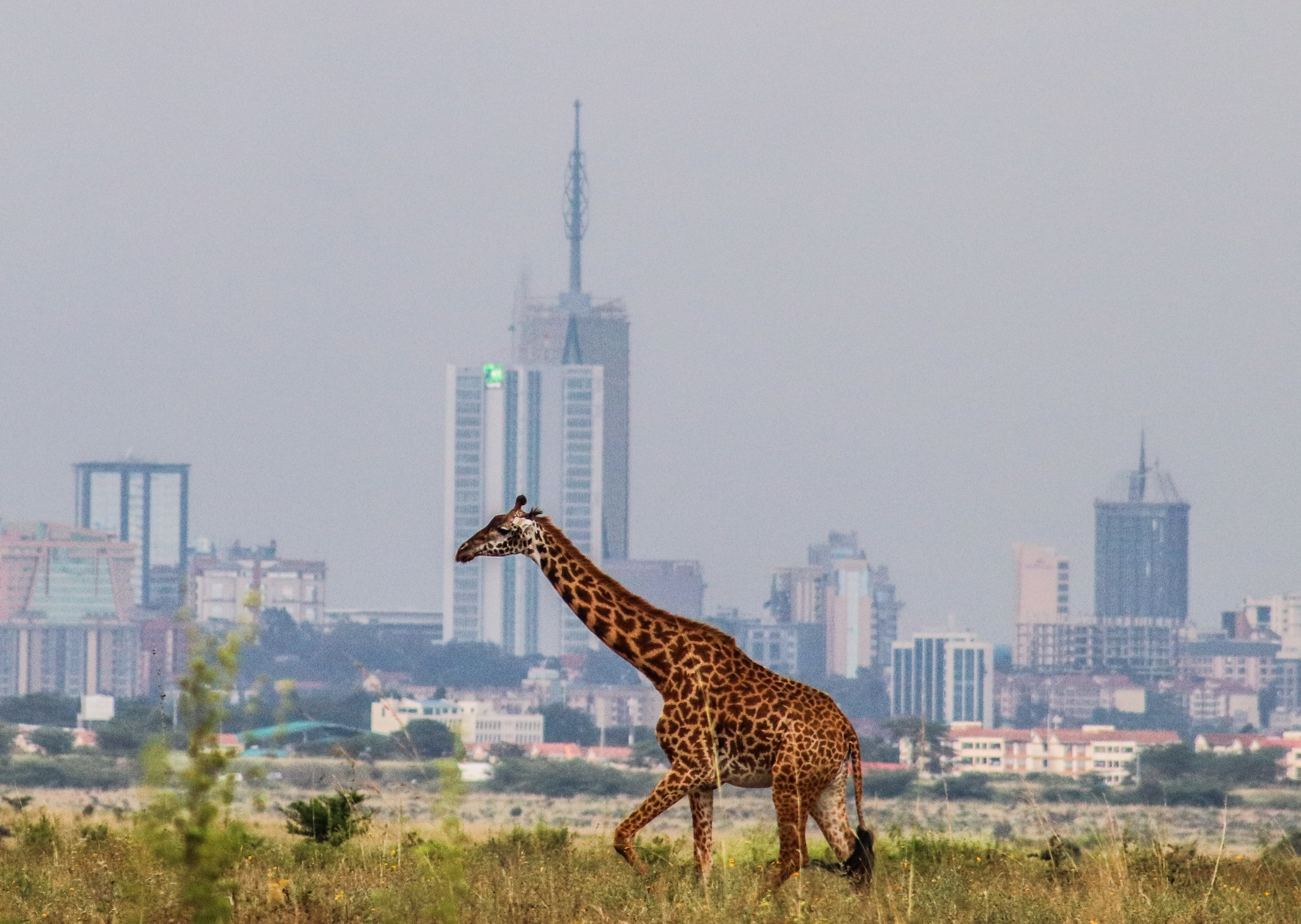
Masai Giraffe in Nairobi National Park, 2020

The national park system of Kenya is maintained by the Kenya Wildlife Service. There are two main types of terrestrial protected areas in Kenya: national parks, and national reserves; there are also marine parks and marine reserves.

== National parks ==
- Aberdare National Park
- Amboseli National Park
- Arabuko Sokoke National Park
- Central Island National Park
- Chyulu Hills National Park
- Hell's Gate National Park
- Kisite-Mpunguti Marine National Park
- Kora National Park
- Lake Nakuru National Park
- Malindi Marine National Park
- Malka Mari National Park
- Meru National Park
- Mombasa Marine Park
- Mount Elgon National Park
- Mount Kenya National Park
- Mount Longonot National Park
- Nairobi National Park
- Ol Donyo Sabuk National Park
- Ruma National Park
- Saiwa Swamp National Park
- Sibiloi National Park
- Tsavo East National Park
- Tsavo West National Park
- Watamu Marine National Park

== National reserves ==
- Arawale National Reserve
- Bisanadi National Reserve
- Boni National Reserve
- Buffalo Springs National Reserve
- Dodori National Reserve
- Kakamega Forest National Reserve
- Lake Bogoria National Reserve
- Masai Mara National Reserve
- Mwea National Reserve
- Rahole National Reserve
- Rimoi National Reserve
- Samburu National Reserve
- Shimba Hills National Reserve
- Tana River Primate Reserve
- Witu Forest Reserve (Utwani Forest Reserve)

== Marine parks and reserves ==
- Kisite-Mpunguti Marine National Park
- Kiunga Marine National Reserve
- Malindi Marine National Park
- Mombasa Marine National Park and Reserve
- Tana River Primate National Reserve
- Watamu Marine National Park

== See also ==
- List of national parks in Africa
- Tourism in Kenya
