= Tourism in Kenya =

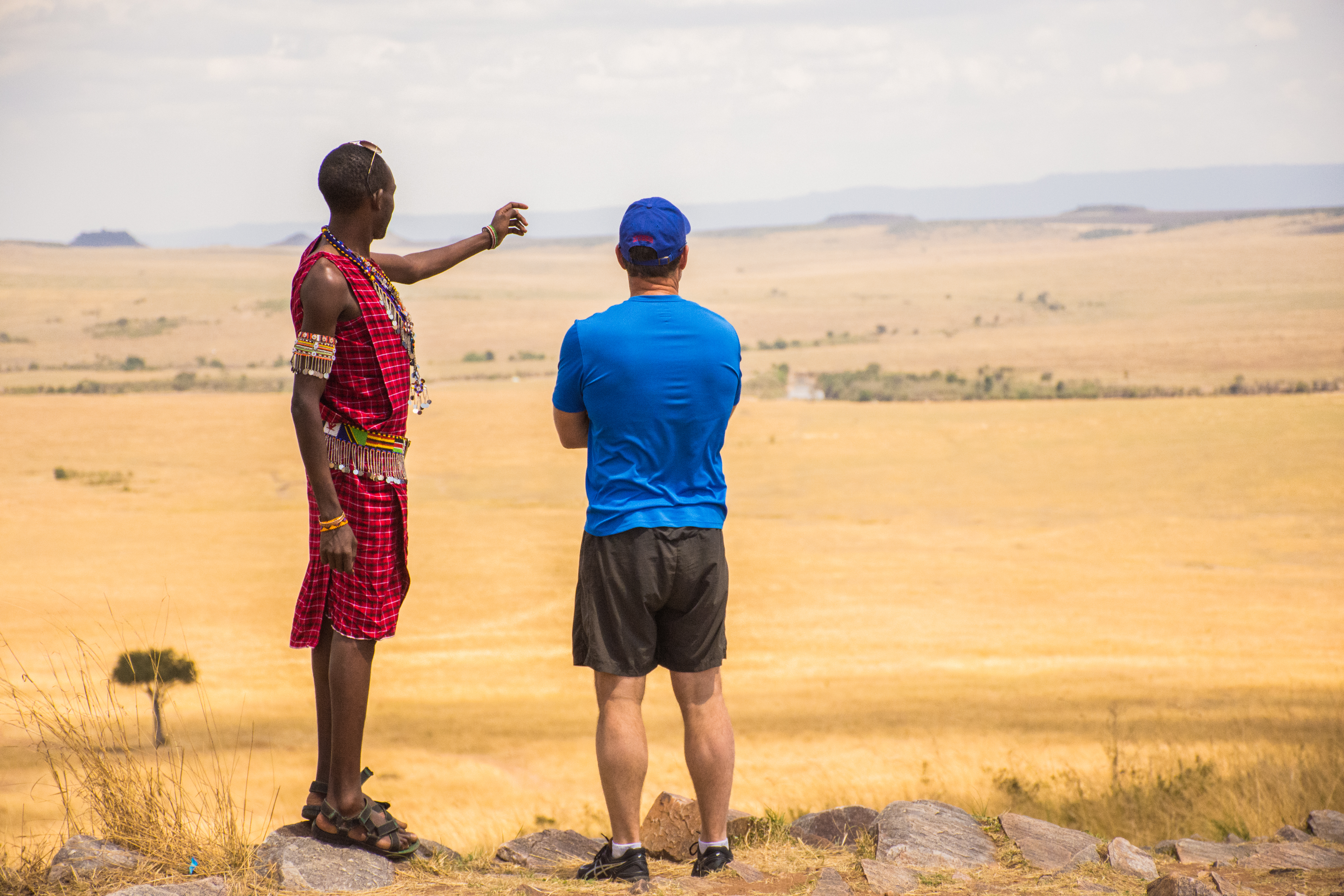
Maasai guide sharing his knowledge

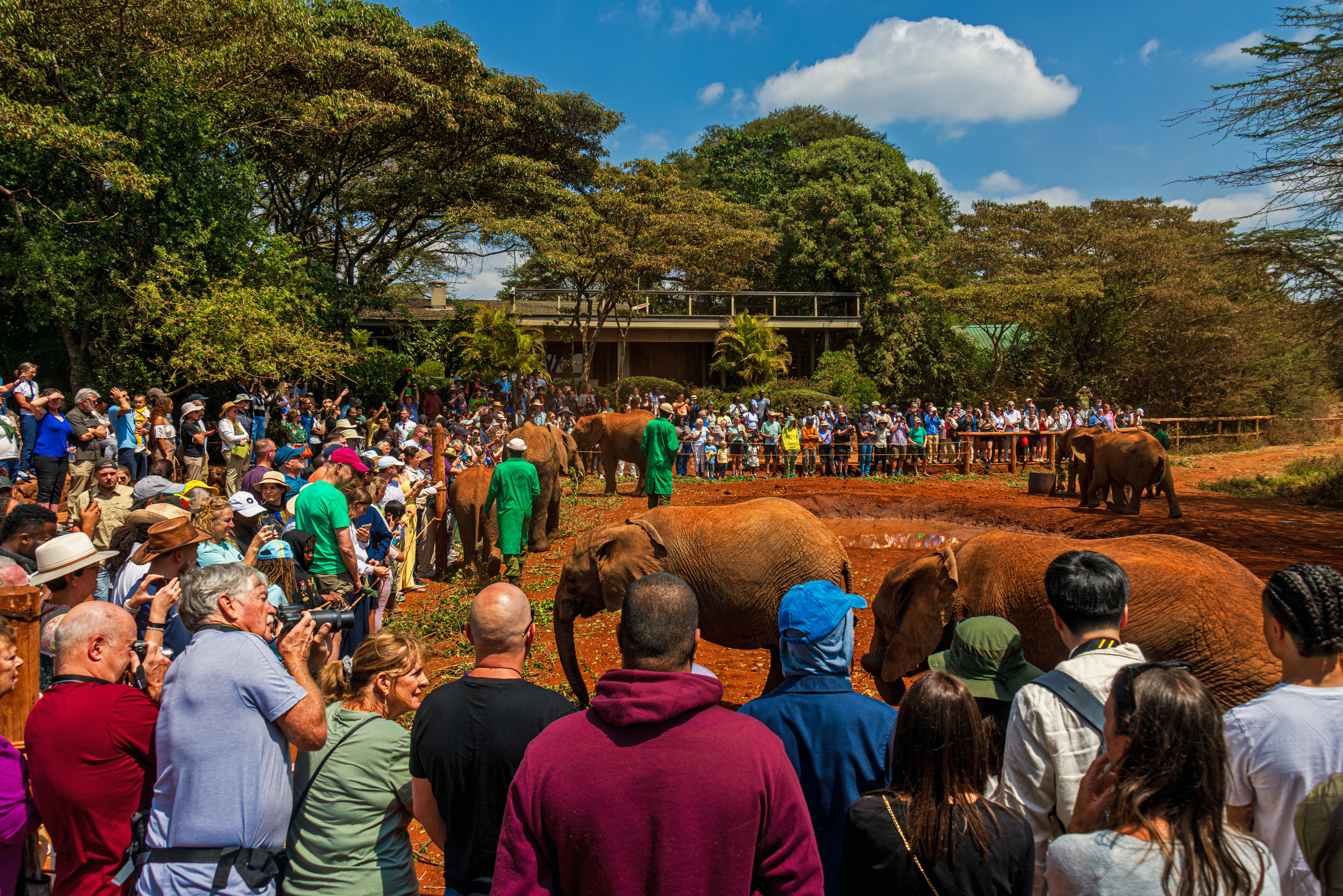
Tourists viewing orphaned elephants being raised for return to the wild at the David Sheldrick Wildlife Trust in Nairobi

Tourism in Kenya is Kenya's third largest source of foreign exchange revenue, following diaspora remittances and agriculture. The Kenya Tourism Board is responsible for maintaining information about tourism in Kenya.

== History ==
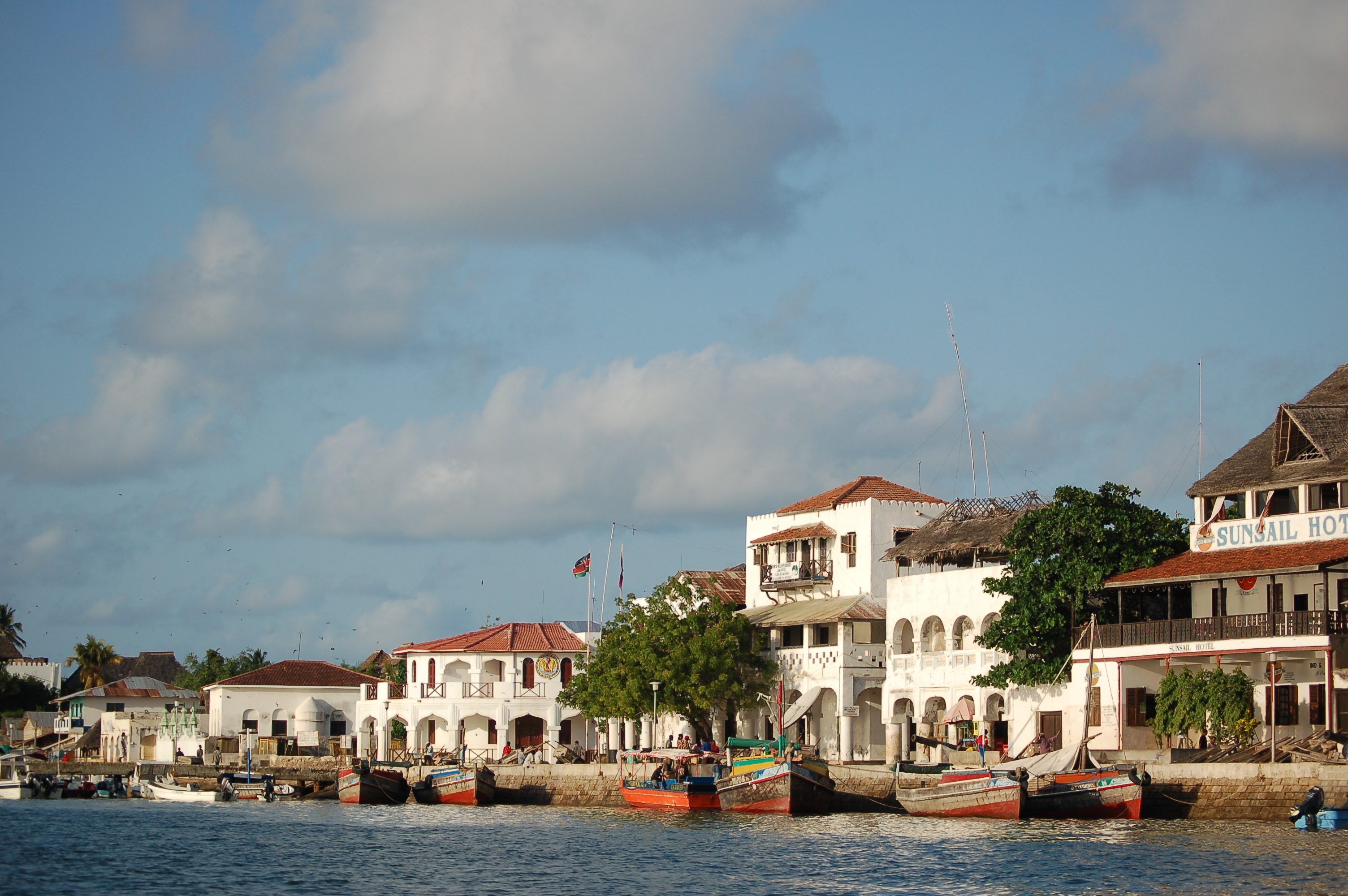
Old Town of Lamu

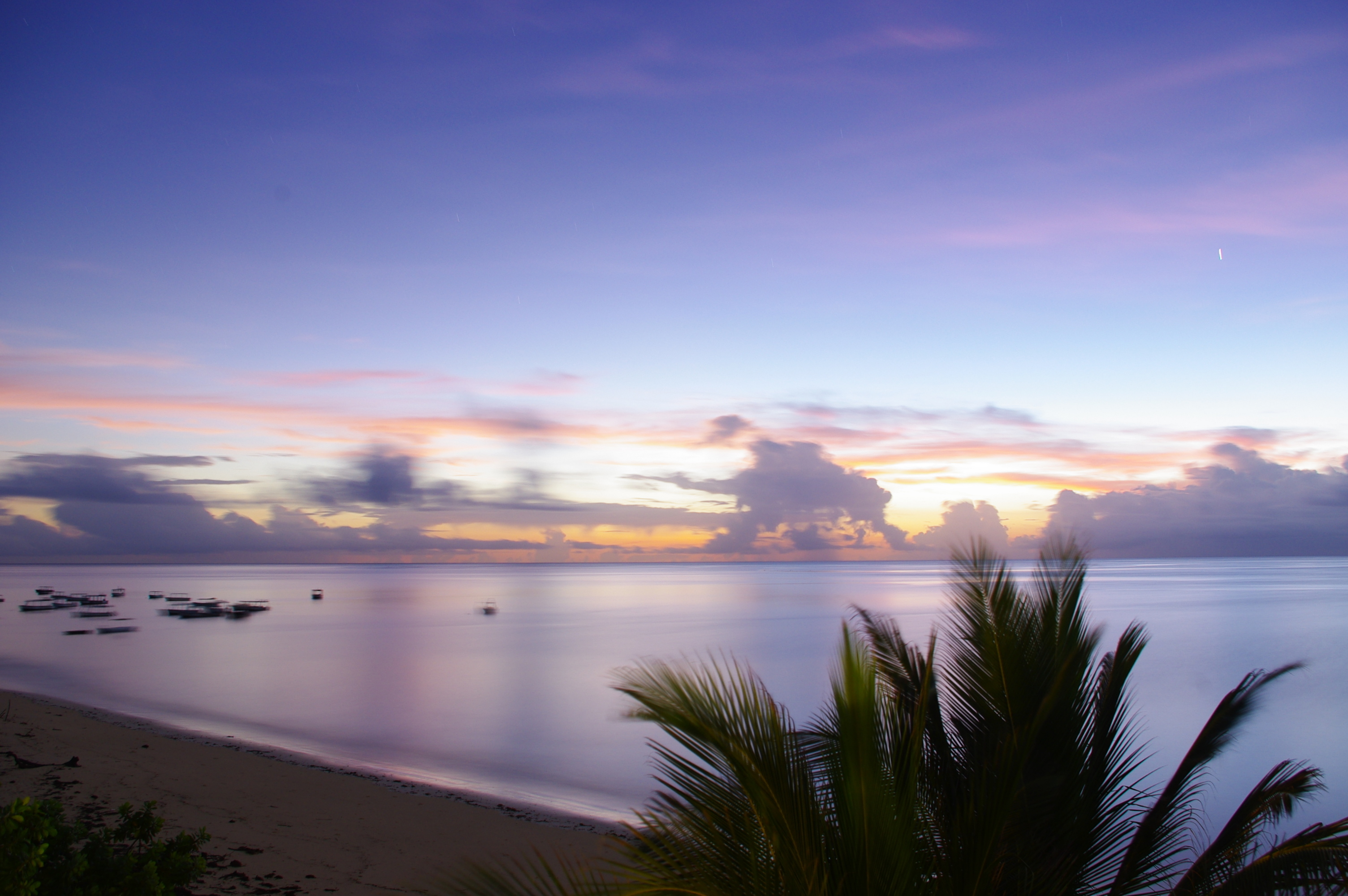
Sunrise in the beach of Malindi

Beach tourism, eco-tourism, cultural tourism, and sports tourism are all part of the tourism sector in Kenya. During the 1990s, the number of tourists traveling to Kenya decreased, partly due to the well-publicized murders of several tourists. However, tourism in Kenya is one of the leading sources of foreign exchange (along with coffee).

Following the 2007 presidential election and the 2007–2008 Kenyan crisis that followed, tourism revenues plummeted 54 percent from 2007 in the first quarter of 2008. It fell to KSh.8.08 billion/= (US$130.5 million) from KSh.17.5 billion/= in January–March 2007 and a total of 130,585 tourists arrived in Kenya compared to over 273,000 that year. Tourist income from China dropped 10.7%, compared with over 50% from traditional revenue earners in the United States and Europe. Domestic tourism improved by 45%, earning the tourist sector KSh.3.65 billion/= out of the KSh.8.08 billion/= in the period being reviewed.

Conference tourism was badly hit during the first quarter, dropping by 87.4% compared to the growth that occurred in 2007. Conference attendance also declined, with 974 people arriving in Kenya during that period while many conferences were canceled. Business travel declined by 21 percent during the period, and 35,914 travelers came into the country compared to 45,338 during the same period the year before.

Kenya won the Best Leisure Destination award at the World Travel Fair in Shanghai, China, in April 2008. The then permanent secretary in Kenya's Ministry of Tourism, Rebecca Nabutola, stated that the award "goes to testify that Kenya has a unique world-acclaimed tourism product. The recognition will no doubt boost Kenya's tourism and enhance its profile as a leading tourist destination."

Tourist numbers reached a peak of 1.8 million visitors in 2011 before decreasing due to terrorist attacks in 2013, specifically the Westgate Terror Attack, which prompted travel restrictions and advisories, including from England. International tourist arrivals for 2013 were 1.49 million. Despite tourist advisories during the election period, tourist arrivals in Kenya increased to 105862 in December from 72573 in November 2017. Kenya's tourist arrivals averaged 87401.29 from 2006 to 2023.

== Statistics ==
Yearly tourist arrivals in thousands

In 1995, there were 34,211 hotel beds with a 44% occupancy rate. 1,036,628 visitors arrived in Kenya in 2000 and tourism receipts totaled $257 million. That year, the US government estimated the average cost of staying in Nairobi at $202 per day, compared to $94 to $144 per day in Mombasa, depending on the time of year.

In 2018, 2,025,206 tourists visited Kenya.

In 2019, the number of global visitors was 2,048,334; 1,423,971 to Nairobi,128,222 to Mombasa, and 27,447 through other airports by ground. Kenya's growth in 2019 was 1,167%. In addition to this overall growth, Jomo Kenyatta International Airport and Moi International Airport showed significant growth of 6.07% and 8.56% respectively. Najib Balala, Tourism Cabinet Secretary in Kenya, is the person credited for an African tourism achievement of $1.6 billion.

== Ecotourism ==
Ecotourism means that people travel responsibly to natural areas while maintaining a high priority on the conservation of the host country's environment and the local community's lifestyles. This differs from mass tourism, which is a more organized and mainstream movement of larger numbers of people to specialized locations, or "popular destinations", such as resorts. Mass tourism is often offered in package deals where the tourist can purchase a plane ticket, hotel, activities, food, etc. from one single company. This type of tourism is usually not concerned with environmental impact or climate change and puts business and revenue as its top priority, whereas the main goal of ecotourism is to make a minimal impact on local communities while improving their state of well-being. The rise of ecotourism has annually increased by 10-15% worldwide, and 20% of that tourism accounts for travel to the global south, with a 6% increase each year in tourism specifically to third-world countries. Kenya's wildlife and unique landscapes have attracted growth in ecotourism, and much of its economy is now primarily sustained by foreign revenue brought in by tourism, causing a myriad of positive and negative impacts to its culture, ecosystems, and the lifestyles of its local people.

=== Positive impacts ===
For travelers, ecotourism is an attractive alternative to the mass migration of vacationers and offers a more intimate interaction with local nature and culture. Instead of spending leisure time inside the walls of a resort, ecotourists have a more "real" experience and are able to gain a better appreciation of the world's natural resources, landscapes, and wildlife. Ecotourism has also influenced businesses like hotels and lodges to be more environmentally conscientious in terms of recycling and providing eco-friendly products. Besides majorly boosting the economy in host countries with foreign currency, tourism provides new job opportunities for locals such as tour guiding, craft making and selling, food services, and cultural performances, which in turn help reduce the need for people to resort to unsustainable practices like poaching or over hunting and fishing. The construction of new medical facilities, cleaner water sources, new roads, and electricity to accommodate incoming tourists simultaneously provides a higher standard of living for the local communities as well. Ecotourism assists in maintaining the environmental integrity and biodiversity of a country by providing an economic desire to preserve native land and wildlife in the form of reservations and game parks, which aid in the protection of threatened species. The revenue from park fees, safari tours, camp fees, and local taxes often contribute to conservation work as well. Rather than the quick fix of monetary donations or handouts, ecotourism potentially offers a more long-term solution to poverty.

=== Negative environmental impacts ===
With the rise of tourism and the subsequent influx in economic opportunity in Kenya, also comes the gradual degradation of its environment and the very ecosystems that are supposedly preserved as the tourists' main attractions. The very construction of wildlife preservations and reserves as a means to conserve environmental biodiversity is, in and of itself, somewhat of a contradiction as it involves the commercial destruction of that unspoiled area to exist. Deforestation is a hugely negative impact suffered in the building process of wildlife areas and the various accommodations needed for tourists, such as lodging, campsites, roads for safari tours, outhouses, firewood, etc. This deforestation not only results in the loss of native flora, but it also causes a dramatic loss of habitat for animal species, resulting in a number of complications. Without their natural habitat, dislocated animals are forced into surrounding areas, causing crowding and competition between previously unconflicted species. During times of stress caused by drought or other natural changes, competition for food, shelter, and water becomes intense and the result could be potentially dire for an entire population.

Lack in training of tour guides and lack in ethics and guidelines for tourists contributes to many of the negative impacts ecotourism has had on Kenya's environment. In one day in the Maasai Mara National Park could be up to 200 guide vehicles shuttling upwards of 700 tourists in and out of the park. Besides the direct effect the trucks have on the soil, causing erosion, compaction, and mud pits, exciting events like the sighting of a leopard could cause major back-ups and traffic jams in the middle of the African bush. Although it is technically against the park rules, tour guides, sometimes encouraged with a bribe from their tourist passengers, will often stray off the designated dirt paths and onto the vegetation so as to let people get a closer look at the wildlife. Not only does this harm the plants that are trampled, perhaps leading to a shortage in food supply for a certain animal species that could possibly rely on them for food, but it also poses a major stress for the animal that is being observed, and most likely photographed, by hordes of tourists.

Interaction between humans and wild animals in their natural habitat can lead to a number of unforeseen and unconscious complications. The mere presence of humans can be sensed by most animals and, although not always visible, can change their physiology and behavior. The sound of footsteps, an approaching vehicle, or the sight of a human being is such a novel stimulus to most animals in the wild that it can cause major shifts in their actions, often resulting in them disrupting their feeding or breeding rituals to either hide or flee, sometimes even abandoning their young in the process. In some cases, like with passing aircraft often carrying tourists for aerial tours in helicopters or hot air balloons, the intrusion is so alarming that it causes a mass scattering of the animals below, disturbing feeding groups, and in some cases the injury or death of an animal as it tries to flee. More subtle noises caused by humans and vehicles, those even unable to be heard by the human ear, can still cause major disruption to the delicate signals used by snakes or some nocturnal animals to find prey or navigate, leading them to become confused or lost. Another problem is caused by the sheer amount of foreign travel in and out of rural villages and reservations that otherwise are not exposed to certain bacteria, which can sometimes lead to the introduction of foreign diseases into both human and animal communities. Most of the negative effects tourism has on wildlife are short term changes in their behavior, but after repeated exposure to human induced stimuli they can become desensitized and habituated with the presence of tourists and lose aspects of their natural behavior, resulting in possible long-term effects to their entire population like reduced breeding or increased mortality.

Apart from the micro-effects of ecotourism on the native ecology of Kenya, the macro-effects of increased human presence in rural areas on the environment substantially contributes to climate change. For instance, increased air travel and emissions, increased traffic congestion, exhaust from safari tours, and hot air balloon tours all contribute to air pollution. Proper waste disposal precautions are often not set in place and excess sewage waste is tossed into cattle grazing grounds or rivers, resulting in polluted drinking water. Although ecotourism is undoubtedly a greener approach to tourism, it still needs to be managed if it is to be sustainable and have a minimal impact on animals, ecosystems, and the environment as a whole.

== Growth of domestic tourism ==
Kenya's dependence on foreign tourism has greatly reduced over the years. In 2019, foreign tourist revenues stood at $1.76 billion, accounting for only 1.6% of Kenya's GDP and approximately 12% of all international tourism receipts in Eastern Africa.

The growing middle class in Kenya has also led to a significant growth in domestic tourism over the years. This steady growth in domestic tourism has defied the turmoil of elections or terror attacks. In 2014, for the first time, Kenya National Bureau of Statistics (KNBS) data showed that the number of Kenyans accommodated in hotel rooms was higher than that of foreign tourists, pointing to the increasing significance of domestic tourism and highlighting the need for the government to focus on promoting domestic tourism over international visitors as a way of yielding more sustainable growth in the tourism sector.

In 2018, domestic tourists’ bed occupancy accounted for 52.9% of the total bed occupancy in the country.

== Tourist attractions ==
=== Climate ===
Kenya has a climate with mostly warm weather conditions year round, without the extremes of summer or winter (there are two rainy seasons: from March–May and September–October). One of the reasons for the mild, low-humidity climate is the relatively high altitude across much of the country. The coastal region does get humid and is warmer but temperatures do not typically exceed the mid 30 °C. For this reason, air-conditioning and ceiling fans are more common along the coast or in areas near Lake Victoria, such as Kisumu city which is warm and humid.

=== Landscapes ===
Kenya is known for its scenic and diverse landscapes, set within a relatively small area. It is possible to take a one-hour flight from Nairobi and arrive in a desert, lush tea estate, alpine forest or savannah, depending on direction of travel.

=== Infrastructure ===
The tourist infrastructure in Kenya is highly developed with a network of professionally managed national parks, highways, flight connectivity (international and domestic) and an internationally recognized hotel and hospitality industry.

=== Wildlife ===
One of Kenya's most significant attractions is wildlife viewing. These include large cat species such as lions, leopards and cheetahs, as well as elephants, rhinos, and giraffes. All of these animals may be seen in their natural habitats during a wildlife safari. Visitors may see the "Big Five" (lion, elephant, rhino, leopard and buffalo) and "Big Nine" (cheetah, giraffe, hippo, zebra) while on safari.

=== Culture ===
The people of Kenya are generally known to be welcoming and friendly to tourists and foreigners. Local culture, cuisine and lifestyle serve as attractions in addition to the better-known draw of the wildlife.

=== Variety of activities ===
Tourism in Kenya offers short and long form adventure activities and experiences, including homestays, hot-air balloon safaris, golfing holidays and special interest holidays.

=== Attractions ===
Attractions include:

- Amboseli National Park
- Arabuko Sokoke Forest Reserve
- Chyulu Hills National Park
- Hell's Gate National Park
- Kakamega Forest National Reserve
- Kisite Mpunguti Marine Park
- Kisumu Impala Sanctuary
- Kora National Park
- Lake Naivasha
- Lake Nakuru National Park
- Lamu Island
- Maasai Mara National Reserve
- Malindi Marine National Park
- Malka Mari National Park
- Marsabit National Park
- Meru National Park
- Mombasa Marine National Park and Reserve
- Mount Elgon National Park
- Mount Kenya National Park
- Mount Longonot National Park
- Mwea National Reserve
- Nairobi National Park and The David Sheldrick Wildlife Trust
- Ol Donyo Sabuk National Park
- Ol Pejeta Conservancy
- Ruma National Park
- Saiwa Swamp National Park
- Samburu National Reserve, and Shaba National Reserves
- Shimba Hills National Reserve
- Sibiloi National Park
- Watamu Marine National Reserve
- Tsavo East National Park
- Tsavo West National Park

== See also ==
- Visa policy of Kenya
