= Wildlife of Kenya =

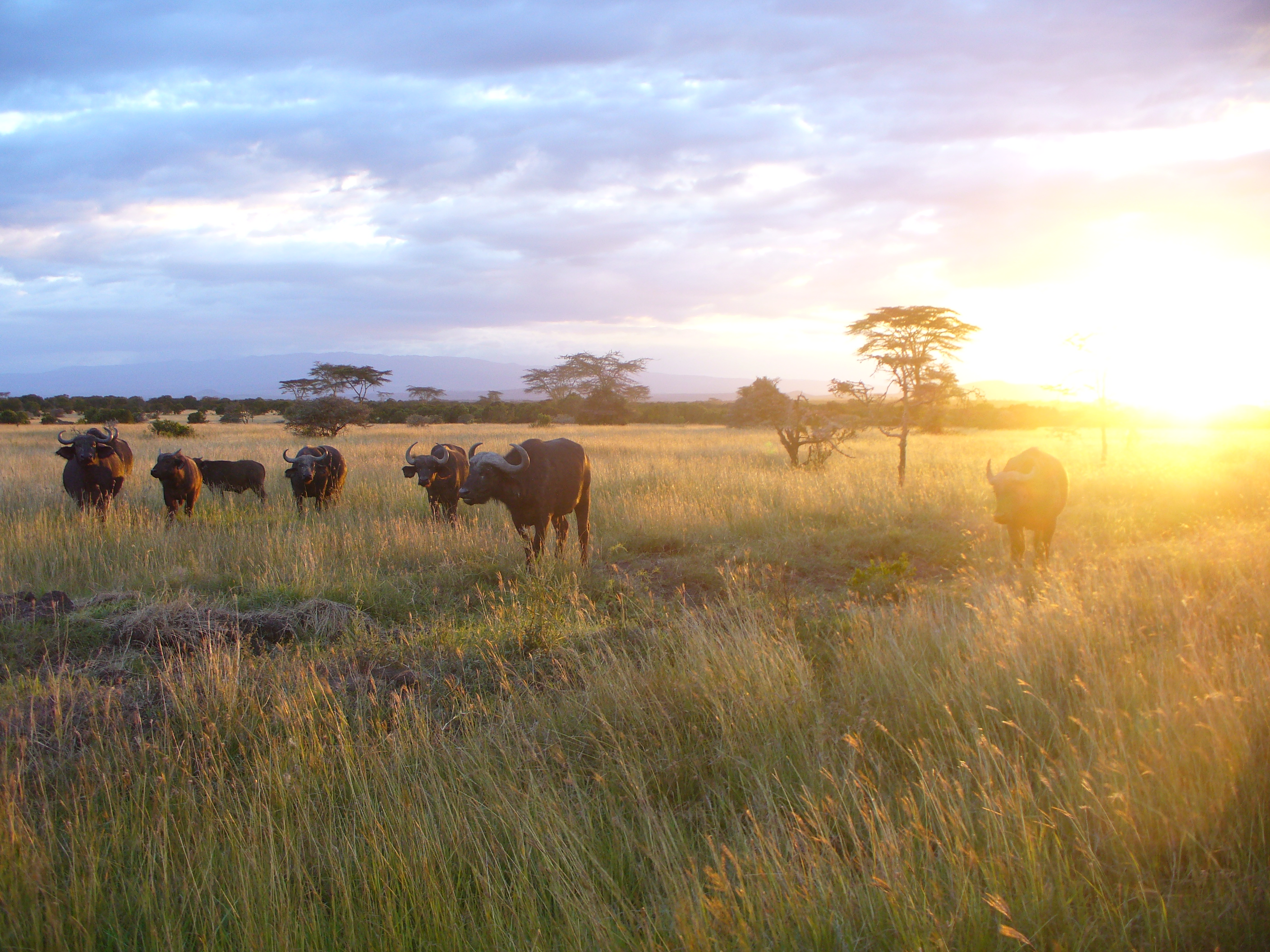
A herd of African buffalo in Kenya

The wildlife of Kenya refers to its fauna. The diversity of Kenya's wildlife has garnered international fame, especially for its populations of large mammals. Mammal species include lion (Panthera leo), cheetah (Acinonyx jubatus) hippopotamus (Hippopotamus amphibius), African buffalo (Syncerus caffer), wildebeest (Connochaetes), African bush elephant (Loxodonta africana), zebra (Equus), giraffe (Giraffa), and rhinoceros. Kenya has a very diverse population of birds, including flamingo and common ostrich (Struthio camelus).

== Fauna ==
=== Mammals ===
==== Large plains herbivores ====
Common eland
The largest of the antelope in the savannah, lives in most national parks and reserves.

Wildebeest
Share grazing with zebra and stay in groups, lives in places like Nairobi National Park and Amboseli National Park. It also visits Masaai Mara National Reserve in great numbers during the spring as part of the annual great migration.

African buffalo
Known to be the most dangerous animal in Africa. They can be found in most national parks and reserves.

Black and white rhinoceros
Most black and white species are being relocated to safe places because of their endangerment, but there are still many wild rhinos roaming Kenya. Although there are few places to see them, they can be found at Nairobi National Park, Tsavo National Park, Masaai Mara and Aberdares National Park. Both species are abundant in Lake Nakuru National Park and Lewa Downs.

Elephant
Found in many different habitats in Kenya. They can be found from the hot coastlands to the cool moorlands of the Aberdares and Mount Kenya range. A few of these places are Aberdares National Park, Meru National Park, Samburu National Reserve, Maasai Mara, Tsavo National Park and Amboseli National Park.

Giraffe
Have little competition for the tender leaves of the acacia tree, their principal food.

==== Aquatic herbivores ====
Hippopotamus
Irritable and normally cranky, are very dangerous. They are found in many of Kenya's basins, swamps, and areas with water. Some other places to find them are Nairobi National Park, Meru National Park, and Kora National Park.

==== Medium-sized herbivores ====
Impala
A medium-sized antelope often found in large herds, and known for its leaping ability.

Common warthog
A type of wild pig.

Waterbuck
A medium-sized antelope often found near sources of water, are known for excreting a scent that makes them unappetizing to most predators. Two subspecies, the common and defassa waterbuck are present in Kenya.

Lesser kudu
The smaller relative of the significantly larger greater kudu, the lesser kudu is often a rare sight but common throughout the drier parts of the country.

==== Small herbivores ====
Suni
A small antelope similar to the oribi and duiker. They travel in groups of two or alone. They can be found in different areas in Kenya.

Oribi
They travel alone or in groups of two or three. They are similar to the suni and the duiker.

Duiker
Normally travel alone but sometimes go in pairs. They are similar to the suni and oribi.

Thomson's gazelle and Grant's gazelle
A common sight across the plains of Kenya, they are often found in small or large herds and are the favored prey of the cheetah. Two species, the more common Thomson's gazelle and the larger Grant's gazelle live across the country.

==== Predators ====
Lion
A powerful predator which uses its power to its advantage. It can be found all over Kenya, especially in Nairobi National Park, Mount Kenya National Park, and Kora National Park.
Leopard
Another predator which, like the lion, uses brute force. They hunt at night and use their eyesight to spot and kill their prey. They can be found at Nairobi National Park, Mount Kenya National Park, Meru National Park, Kora National Park and over almost all of Kenya.
Cheetah
A big cat that lives in places like Nairobi National Park, Meru National Park and Kora National Park.
African wild dog
A predator that roams over parts of Kenya in packs. The African Wild Dog Conservancy is actively engaged in helping to save this endangered species from extinction.
Spotted hyena
A powerful predator that sometimes travels in groups. They have the strongest jaw pressure and most powerful bite out of any animal in Kenya except for the Nile crocodile. Both the spotted and striped variety of hyena can be found at Nairobi National Park, Mount Kenya National Park, and Kora National Park.
Serval
One of the small wild cat species in Kenya.
Genet
A small viverrid that lives in Kenya.
Black-backed jackal
A small dog-like predator that travels in small groups across Kenya.

=== Reptiles ===
Nile crocodile
A large, powerful reptile that has been known to attack and kill people. It inhabits many areas of Kenya.

== National parks ==
- Nairobi National Park
- Mount Kenya National Park
- Meru National Park
- Kora National Park
- Sibiloi National Park
- Amboseli National Park
- Tsavo East National Park
- Tsavo West National Park
- Lake Nakuru National Park
- Hell's Gate National Park
- Chyulu Hills National Park
- Marsabit National Park
- Ol Donyo Sabuk National Park
- Aberdare National Park
- Saiwa Swamp National Park

== Reserves ==
- Maasai Mara
- Samburu National Reserve
- Buffalo Springs National Reserve
- Shaba National Reserve
- Shimba Hills National Reserve
- Kisumu Impala Sanctuary
- Lewa Downs ← a conservancy

== See also ==
- Elephant hunting in Kenya
- Maasai Mara conservancies
