= Solio Ranch =

Private wildlife conservancy in Kenya

- Location within Kenya
- Country: Kenya
- Province: Central Province
- Time zone: UTC+3 (EAT)

Solio Ranch or Solio Game Reserve is a privately owned wildlife conservancy located in Kenya's Central Province.

The ranch is a fenced, privately owned, protected area for rhino conservation. The 7,100-hectare (17,500-acre) reserve, 22 km north of Nyeri, plays a major role in the protection and breeding of black rhinos in Kenya. The rhino is a member of the 'Big-Five', which are a key tourist attraction; other wildlife include the buffalo, zebra, giraffe and plains game such as eland, oryx, impala, waterbuck, Thompson's gazelle and warthog. By the end of 2009, Kenya had 635 black rhinos and 353 white rhinos in various conservation areas around the country.

== Name ==
Solio Ranch is named after Solio who was a great Maasai chief.

== History ==
The world's first private rhino sanctuary, Solio Game Reserve was started in 1970 when Courtland Parfet, the owner of Solio cattle ranch, fenced off a large section of land and dedicated it to conservation; breeding has been so successful that rhino from Solio have stocked game reserves all over Africa.

Originally a cattle ranch, Solio Game Reserve was formed as part of a conservation effort initiated by the owners, The Parfet Family. They apportioned a huge part of their land for the conservation and breeding of rhinos, in particular the threatened black rhino. It was the first of its kind in Africa with an ambitious objective to protect and breed rhino, given rhino poaching was increasing at a rate that would surely wipe out the species in Kenya. Black rhino populations in Kenya dropped from around 18,000 in the late 1960’s to less than 1,500 by 1980 and about 400 in 1990. The Kenyan Government in the 1970s supported and helped with the protection of the sanctuary with the Kenyan Armed Forces as well as Kenya Wildlife Service (KWS).

From 1970 through to 2003, the world population of the African black rhinoceros declined from about 65,000 to an estimated 3,725. It was estimated that in Kenya, the population dropped from 18,000 to 1500 in 1980 and only 400 in 1990. In percentage terms the population dropped from 28% to a mere 12% of the world population. This sharp decline was caused by poaching during the 1970s and the early 1980s, both inside and outside the national parks and reserves, with few controls and little enforcement.

One outcome of the intensive killing was to leave small remnant populations, sometimes just a single individual, scattered across the country with no hope of long-term survival and often endangering nearby human settlements while still under threat from poaching.

Kenya's Wildlife and Conservation Management Department approached Mr Courtland Parfet, owner of the Solio cattle ranch located on the Laikipia plateau in central Kenya, for assistance. With a commitment to conservation, a 5,500-hectare (13,500-acre) area of the ranch had already been fenced off to protect indigenous wildlife and allow them to live their natural life without interference or threat from humans. The Solio Game Reserve was home to many buffalos, zebras, gazelles and leopards but there were no rhinos.

The Wildlife and Conservation Management Department, the forerunner of today's Kenya Wildlife Service, requested Solio to take in some remnant black rhinos while a permanent home was found for them. The first five individuals were moved in from Kiboko in the south-east of Kenya in 1970 and the country's first sanctuary for rhinos was established. With no other secure areas available, over the next 10 years the department continued to move in more rhinos. By 1980, 23 founders from nine different areas had been introduced into Solio Game Reserve.

With excellent habitat and securely hidden from view, this new group of rhinos bred and prospered, and the reserve had to be extended to 6,900 hectares (17,000 acres) in 1991. In the meantime other areas in Kenya national parks and private ranches were made sufficiently secure to take in rhinos, and Solio became the prime founder source for many populations.

By 1992 there were 66 black rhinos in the reserve, and this after some 30 individuals had been moved out to help form nucleus populations in other new reserves including Nakuru National Park, Sweetwaters Game Reserve, Lewa Downs Conservancy and Ol Jogi. The rhinos continued to thrive, and by the end of 2005 there had been 67 translocations to other areas. However, at the start of 2000 the reserve became a major target for professional poachers and in a five-year period nine black rhinos were either shot or caught in snares.

== Rhino conservation ==
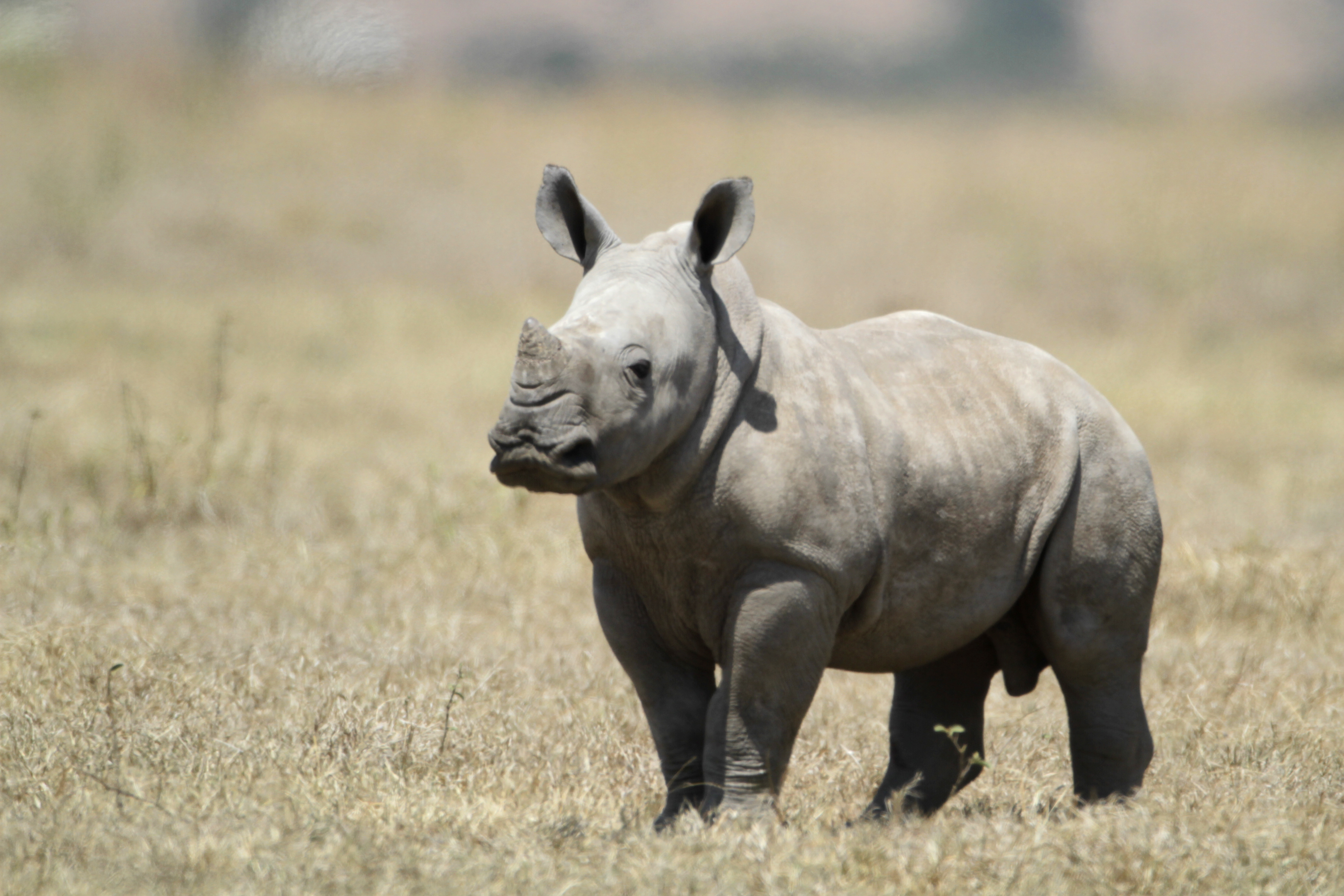
Baby white rhino from Solio Ranch.

In March 2003, the Kenya Wildlife Service (KWS) adopted a new management plan for black rhino conservation in Kenya. Surplus rhinos from both private land and national parks and reserves were to continue being used to complete the stocking of new sanctuaries in both sectors. Kenya Wildlife Service reported that there was an urgent need to maintain a sustainable and high annual growth rate in population to develop and conserve a genetically viable population of black rhinos of the East African race or subspecies (diceros bicornis michaeli) in their natural habitats in Kenya. This was to be accomplished through increased attention to biological management and law enforcement. The specific goal of the KWS strategy was to increase the black rhino numbers by at least 5% per annum and reach a confirmed total of 500 rhinos by 2005, 650 rhinos by 2010 and 1000 by 2020.

== Rhino monitoring scheme ==
In 1990 a fire at the ranch had destroyed records and numbers of rhino in the game reserve were based on estimates. In 1992 there were estimated to be 66 black rhino, but in 2005 after increased poaching the estimate had dropped to 55 animals. A large part of the park consists of bush, making it difficult to observe and track the rhino populations. Also identification of individuals is difficult and prone to error.

In 2005 a monitoring scheme was started. The game reserve was organised in sectors and a photographic database was created of the rhino population. Ranchers were trained to observe and identify individual animals using the photographic database. The location of the animal and time of day would be recorded. After the first year of monitoring 5947 sightings had been made. From the systematically collected data, they concluded that the park contained about 87 rhino, 46 males, 38 females and 3 calves of unknown sex. The age profile of the rhino population was found to be:-

- 17 calves
- 1 aged 3.5–7 years
- 6 aged 7–10 years
- 10 aged 10–15 years
- 16 aged < 20 years
- 23 aged > 20 years
- 9 > 30 years.

Results from the first year of monitoring showed that the population density of the rhino was high with 1.2 rhino/km^{2}. Also the population growth rate during the year was below the 5% growth target set by the KWS. It was concluded that the Solio Game Reserve was over stocked and a reduction of between 45 and 55 individuals would be required.

Thirty individuals were selected using the age and sex profiles collected. The selection had to ensure that balanced populations should remain and be created after trans-location. The translocation was carried out over a 14-day period in February 2007 during which time 30 rhinos were caught, of which one died on site (shown post-mortem to have had an enlarged heart), one was released due to anaesthesia complications and one was released following incorrect in-field identification. The remaining rhino were trans-located to Ol Pejeta Conservancy and Lewa Wildlife Conservancy.

After trans-location, monitoring of the rhino continued, showing a strong increase in population growth rate. After the trans-location the population profile had changed to

- 18 calves
- 10 aged 3.5–7 years
- 2 aged 7–10 years
- 3 aged 10–15 years
- 10 aged < 20 years
- 27 aged > 20 years
- 9 > 30 years.

== Drought 2010 ==
During 2010 the Kenya Wildlife Service planned to move 600 buffaloes from Solio Ranch to the Aberdare National Park and other locations. Solio Ranch is one of Kenya's critical rhino habitats that has suffered adverse effects from the prolonged drought requiring immediate action to protect the rhinos from suffering the consequences.

== Solio Ranch settlement scheme ==
Solio Ranch was originally much larger and had served also as a cattle ranch. In 2007 the Kenyan Government purchased through the Settlement Trustee Fund approximately 6,100 hectares (15,000 acres) from Solio Ranch. Most of the land acquired lies within Laikipia East District in the Rift Valley Province. A smaller portion lies within the Kieni West District close to the Nyeri – Nyahururu road.

== Valuation of land ==
According to the Kenyan Government, 85,000 KES per 4,000-square-metre (1-acre) was paid for the land. The initial valuation for the land had been valued at 50,000 KES per 4,000-square-metre (1-acre), against an initial offer of 100,000 KES per 4,000-square-metre (1-acre) from the owners. The land was sub-divided into three equal divisions of 2,000 hectares (5,000 acres), raising the demand for each sub-division and hence increasing the valuation to 85,000KES per 4,000-square-metre (1-acre). In total the Government paid 1,275,000,000 KES.

The Government was criticised widely that the land had been overpriced.

== Solio Project ==
2,984 squatters and needy, mainly ex-forest squatters who had been evicted from Mount Kenya and Aberdare forests in the 1980s and early 1990s were settled. These squatters had been living on the roadsides in the villages of Hombe in Mathira Constituency, BelleVue in Kieni West, Ndathi in Kieni East, Witima in Othaya and Zauna\Kabage in Tetu.

The scheme consists of seven residential villages of 2,000-square-metre (0.5-acre) plots surrounded by 16,000-square-metre (4-acre) agricultural plots, allowing for the easy provision of infrastructure such as water, schools etc. The first village has 420 plots; Village Two, 587 plots; Village Three, 517 plots; Village Four, 511 plots; Village Five, 226 plots; Village Six, 428 plots; Village Seven, 295 plots.

== Relocation of wildlife, 2008 ==
The sector sold for resettlement contained numerous wildlife species including Lelwel hartebeest (a rare and unique species in the District), plains zebra, impala, Thomson's gazelle, oryx, and eland. These animals were threatened with poaching and other threats so together, the Kenya Wildlife Service (KWS), Lewa Wildlife Conservancy and the Ol Pejeta Conservancy started a process of translocation of over 3000 animals to various conservancies and parks as shown in the table below.

Area	Hartebeast	Zebra	Impala	Thomson's Gazelle	Oryx	Eland
Aberdare NP		250				
Mwea NR		105	100	815		20
Ruma NP	40					
Lewa Conservancy	80	200				
Ol Pejeta Ranch	65	200	110	800	36	21
Mugie Ranch	100					
total	250	850	210	1615	36	41

== Early settlement conditions and drought ==
Initially provision of houses and facilities were not honoured and the settlers were forced to live in tents provided by UNICEF. As a result, for several years Solio had been a refugee camp with people living in the dust.

A prolonged drought changed the land from undeveloped and fertile to an arid wasteland, and it was becoming very difficult to successfully grow anything. A constant strong wind added to the problems, with topsoil being blown off. Living conditions were awful as so many people were forced to live with no permanent structures at all. After two years the tents were ragged and holed. Children were being taught ad hoc in classes of up to 100 children under canvas with no furniture or books. In many respects the settlers had simply been forgotten. In 2009 the NGO, Moving Mountains, started a strategic program to provide housing and schools for the settlers, and since the Kenyan Government has also assisted.

== Community outreach ==
It is reported that the Government bought the land following instructions from First Lady Lucy Kibaki and local area member of parliament Ephraim Maina Mwangi, who were both touched by the plight of squatters, who had for years been residing on a roadside in Kagochi area of Nyeri East District. These squatters had been evicted from Mount Kenya and Aberdare forests. Lady Lucy Kibaki assisted by Mathira member of parliament Ephraim Maina Mwangi approached Central Provincial Commissioner, Jaspher Rugut to find suitable land for the resettlement of these squatters. The government purchased the land from the owners of the Solio ranch for the resettlement of squatters.
