= Kiunga Marine National Reserve =

National reserve in Coast Province, Kenya

- Location within Kenya
- Location: Lamu District, Coast Province, Kenya
- Coordinates: 1°55′19″S 41°21′14″E
- Area: 270 km^{2} (100 sq mi)
- Established: 1979
- Governing body: Kenya Wildlife Service
- Website: www.kws.go.ke/parks/parks_reserves/KMNR.html

Kiunga Marine National Reserve is situated along the Indian Ocean coast of Lamu District, Coast Province, Kenya. Kiunga park covers 270 square kilometres (100 sq mi).

The park covers an area with approximately 50 islands and coral reefs in the Lamu Archipelago. It borders the Boni and Dodori National Reserves.

The Coast is humid with mean annual temperatures ranging from 22 to 34 °C. Rainfall is about 500 mm/year. It is located at an altitude of 30 meters above MSL.

The outer islands of the Reserve host many seabirds. Species nesting here include roseate tern, sooty gull, white-cheeked tern, bridled tern and brown node.
