= Bisanadi National Reserve =

Wildlife reserve in Isiolo County, Kenya

- Interactive map of Bisanadi National Reserve
- Location: Isiolo County
- Nearest city: Meru
- Coordinates: 0.09°N 38.41°E
- Area: 60,600 ha (234 sq mi)
- Designation: National Park of Kenya
- Governing body: Kenya
- Operator: Kenya Wildlife Service
- Owner: Kenyan government
- Administrator: Kenya Wildlife Service

Bisanadi National Reserve is a wildlife reserve in Isiolo County, Kenya. It is adjacent to Meru National Park. The park is home to lion, African elephant, cheetah, white rhinoceros, and African buffalo and over 400 species of birds. Visitors to the reserve can boat/fish on the Tana and Rojewero river.
