= Kenya Wildlife Service =

Kenyan wildlife conservation agency

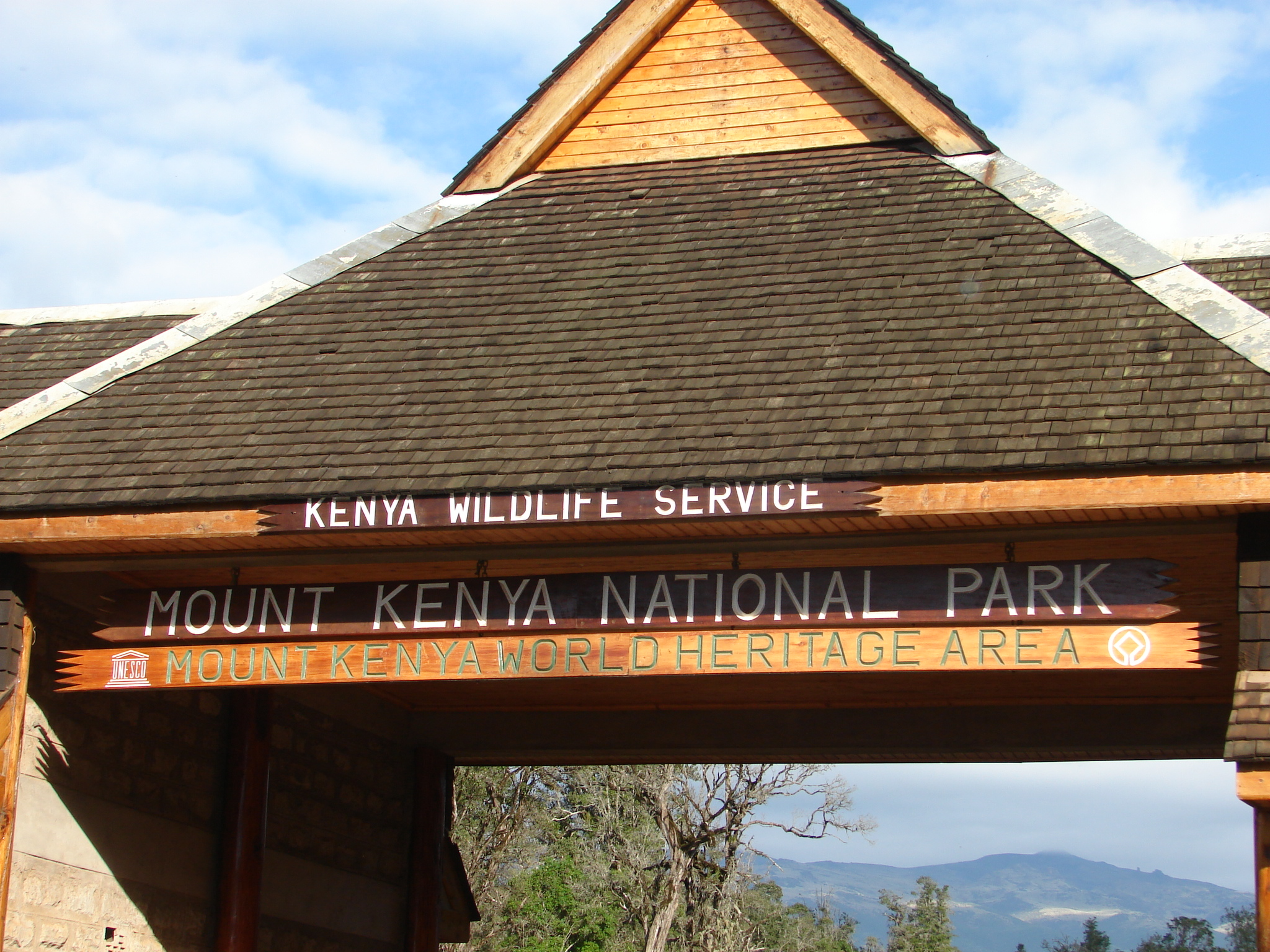
- Industry: Conservation
- Founded: 1989
- Headquarters: Nairobi, Kenya
- Key people: Lt. Gen. (red) Walter Raria Koipaton, Chairman of the Board of Trustees; Dr. Erastus Kanga, Acting Director-General
- Website: Homepage

Kenya Wildlife Service (KWS) is a state corporation under the Ministry of Tourism and Wildlife established by an act of Parliament; Wildlife Conservation and Management Act CAP 376, of 1989, now repealed and replaced by the Wildlife Conservation and Management Act, 2013. At independence, the Government of Kenya committed itself to conserving wildlife for posterity with all the means at its disposal, including the places animals lived, forests and water catchment areas.

Kenya Wildlife Service conserves and manages national parks, wildlife conservation areas, and sanctuaries under its jurisdiction.

== History ==
In 1989 Richard Leakey was appointed the head of the Wildlife Conservation and Management Department (WMCD) by President Daniel Arap Moi in response to the international outcry over the poaching of elephants and the impact it was having on the wildlife of Kenya.

Well-armed anti-poaching units were formed and were authorized to shoot poachers on sight. The poaching menace was dramatically reduced. The transformation of the Kenya Wildlife Service got World Bank approved grants worth $140 million. Richard Leakey, President Moi, and the WMCD made the international news headlines when a stockpile of 12 tons of ivory was burned in 1989 in Nairobi National Park.

These successes saw David Western appointed to serve as Director of the Kenya Wildlife Service (KWS) by retired President Moi in 1994. Others who served as KWS Directors are:

- Brig. (Rtd) John Waweru
- Kitili Mbathi
- William Kiprono
- Julius Kipng'etich
- Michael Wamithi
- Nehemiah Rotich
- Joseph Kioko
- Evans Mukolwe

On 20 July 2011 Kenya’s President Mwai Kibaki set on fire nearly 5 tonnes of elephant ivory (335 tusks), with an estimated value of US$16m.

On 30 April 2016, Kenyan President Uhuru Kenyatta set alight the largest ever pile of ivory for destruction in the Nairobi National Park. The pile consisted of 105 tonnes of elephant ivory from about 8,000 elephants and 1.35 tonnes of horns from 343 rhinoceroses. Estimates for the total black market value of the destroyed contraband range from $150 million to $220 million. The ivory was transported to the site in shipping containers then stacked into towers up to 10 ft (3.0 m) tall and 20 ft (6.1 m) in diameter. The ivory towers took personnel from the Kenya Wildlife Service ten days to build. The pyre also contained exotic animal skins. The amount of ivory destroyed equaled about 5% of the global stock. Gabonese President Ali Bongo Ondimba was also in attendance.

== National parks and reserves ==
Kenya has over 40 designated national parks and reserves, including:

- Aberdare National Park
- Amboseli National Park
- Arabuko Sokoke National Park
- Arawale National Reserve
- Bisanadi National Reserve
- Boni National Reserve
- Central Island National Park
- Chyulu Hills National Park
- Dodori National Reserve
- Hell's Gate National Park
- Kakamega Forest Reserve
- Kisite-Mpunguti Marine National Park
- Kisumu Impala Sanctuary
- Kora National Park
- Lake Bogoria National Reserve
- Lake Nakuru National Park
- Losai National Reserve
- Malindi Marine National Park
- Malka Mari National Park
- Marsabit National Reserve
- Meru National Park
- Mombasa Marine National Park and Reserve
- Mount Elgon National Park
- Mount Kenya National Park
- Mount Longonot National Park
- Mwea National Reserve
- Nairobi National Park
- Ndere Island National Reserve
- Ol Donyo Sabuk National Park
- Ol Pejeta Conservancy
- Ruma National Park
- Saiwa Swamp National Park
- Samburu National Reserve
- Shaba National Reserve
- Shimba Hills National Reserve
- Sibiloi National Park
- Tana River Primate Reserve
- Tsavo East National Park
- Tsavo West National Park
- Watamu Marine National Park

== Conservation programmes ==
KWS runs specific programmes to assist Kenyan species and their habitats that are in particular danger. They have forest and Wetland conservation programmes, as well as specific elephant and rhino projects to help them recover from poaching. The hirola, which is in danger of extinction, is also being monitored.

Within KWS there are several services, each responsible for a different area of work:

=== Community Wildlife Service ===
This branch of the KWS works outside the national parks. They work instead in areas such as wildlife corridors, and teach the communities living there to encourage conservation and look after their resources.

=== Security Services ===
The job of this service is to eliminate poaching in the national parks and stop illegal trade. The Kenyan government has also erected fences which keeps the precious animals/wildlife inside the national park.

The Kenya wildlife service, through its rangers, offer extensive patrols and protection of the country’s wildlife in its wild spaces and as a result hundreds of rangers have lost their lives in the line of duty.

=== Veterinary Services ===
This service ensures that healthy breeding populations of species are maintained throughout the country.

== Ranks ==
Kenya Wildlife Service
Kenya Wildlife Service	Director	Deputy director	Senior assistant director	Assistant director	Senior warden	Warden I	Warden II	Assistant warden I	Assistant warden II	Assistant warden III

Kenya Wildlife Service					No insignia
Kenya Wildlife Service	Sergeant major	Senior sergeant	Sergeant	Corporal	Ranger

== Training ==
KWS has a training institute, also referred to as Kenya Wildlife Service Training Institute. The facility located in Naivasha, is a middle-level college registered with the Ministry of Education, Science and Technology as a TVET institution. It offers specialized certificate and diploma courses in natural resource management, ecology and tourism in an effort to enhance conservation, management and sustainability of wildlife bio-diversity in Kenya and globally.

KWS also has a Law Enforcement Academy is situated in Manyani Area, which caters for all law enforcers' paramilitary training. Manyani area was established in 1990.

== Education ==
KWS run several education centres:

- Nairobi Safari Walk
- Nairobi Education Centre
- Lake Nakuru Education Centre
- Tsavo East Education Centre
- Tsavo West Education Centre

These are located inside National Parks, and run programs to encourage people to care for their environment. It is aimed at local people, particularly school groups, but is open to anyone.

== Influential administrators ==
- Dr. Erastus Kanga (Current Acting Director-General)
- Brig. (Rtd.) John M. Waweru, EBS
- Julius Kipng'etich, former Director General (departed 2012)
- Ronald kipruto koech
- Michael Kipkeu
- Richard Leakey, Chairman of the Board of Trustees
- Kitili Mbathi, Director General (since 2016)

== See also ==
- List of national parks of Kenya
