= Kisumu Impala Sanctuary =

Animal sanctuary in Kisumu, Kenya

- Location within Kenya
- Location: Kisumu County, Kenya
- Nearest city: Kisumu
- Coordinates: 0°07′07″S 34°44′41″E
- Area: < 1 km^{2} (0.39 sq mi)
- Established: 1992
- Governing body: Kenya Wildlife Service
- Website: Kisumu Impala Sanctuary

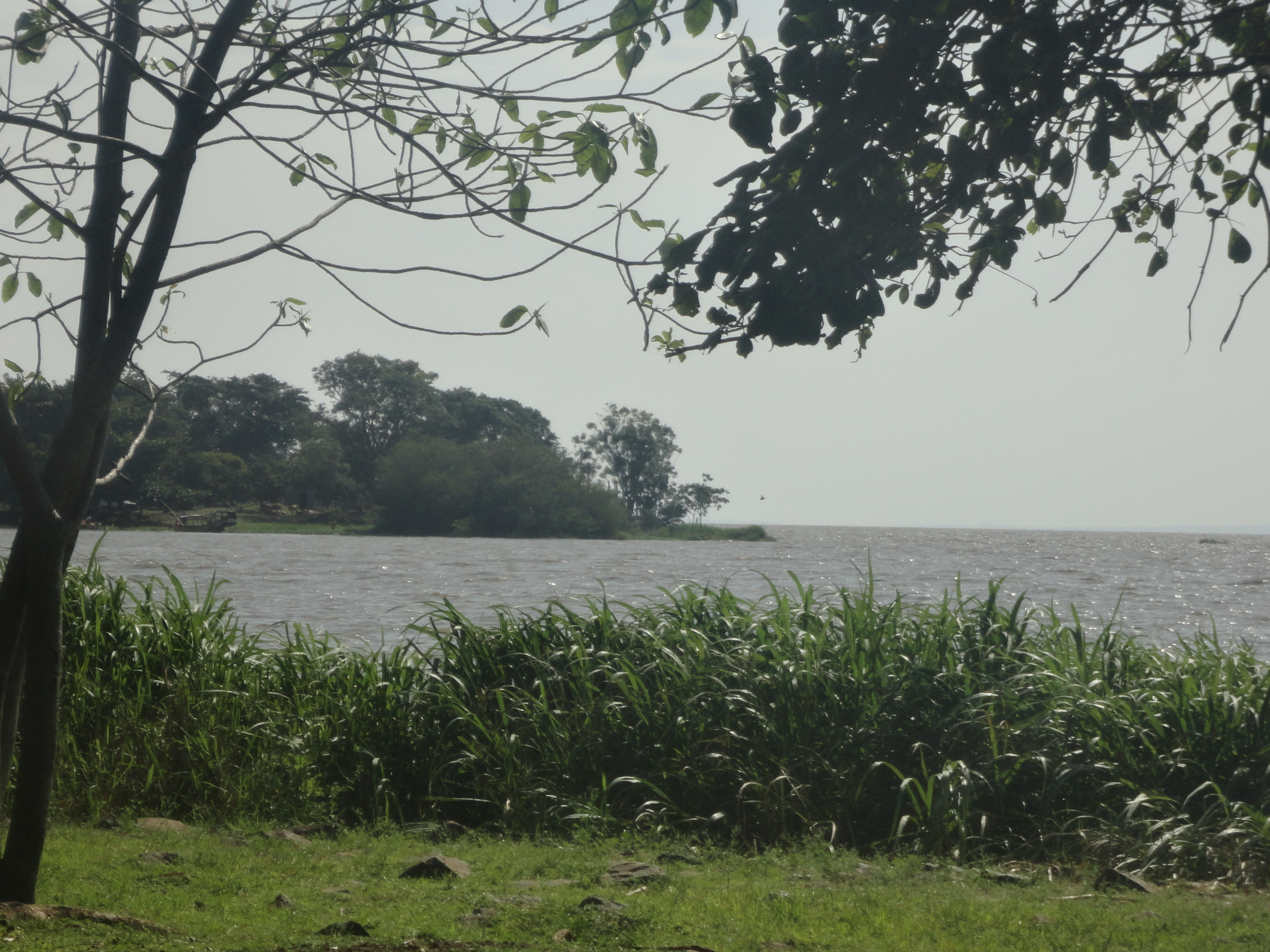
View of Lake Victoria from Kisumu Impala Sanctuary

Located within Kisumu city, Kisumu Impala Sanctuary lies on the shores of Lake Victoria, covering less than 1km2. The facility was gazetted in 1992. In March 2010, the sanctuary was branded as ‘a lakeshore walk with impalas'. There are a diverse number of flora (of trees, grass & herbs) and fauna both free ranging and captive. Over 115 species of birds have been recorded. Presently, the sanctuary boasts of all the big five game except for the elephant. A number of nature trail circuits are also available for clients.

Annually, the sanctuary conducts the Kisumu Impala Conservation Boat Race event in November to help create awareness of wildlife, especially the endangered sitatunga antelope.

Apart from nature viewing and boat riding, the sanctuary is a key site for ecology and wildlife research and education.

== Wildlife ==
The animal sanctuary houses lions, African leopards, cape buffalos, olive baboons, hyenas, Tanzanian cheetahs, side-striped jackals, rescued grey parrots, guinea fowls, impalas, leopard tortoises and vervet monkeys among others. Many species of snake, monitor lizard, dragon fly, frog, and butterfly are also present.

The sanctuary also provides an important open grazing for hippopotamus population and refuge for the threatened sitatunga antelope in the nearby swamps.

== Facilities ==
Visitors to the sanctuary can find different types of accommodation according to their taste, ranging from the Impala eco-safari lodge with a 24-bed capacity and one campsite (State Lodge Campsite). There are also four picnic sites. The Sundowner tower overlooks the railway trail and is a breath-taking area for sunsets on the shores of the second largest fresh water lake in the world.

== Park entry and charges ==
The sanctuary is open daily from 6:00 am to 6:00 pm. Entry on foot is allowed. Security is available for vehicles parked. When Covid-19 struck, payment is by mobile money or credit card only.

== See also ==
- List of national parks of Kenya
