= Dodori National Reserve =

Protected area of Kenya

Coordinates: 1°50′0″S 41°8′0″E

Dodori National Reserve is a protected area located in Lamu East District of Coast Province in Kenya. It was documented in 1976 and its 877 km^{2} encompasses an important woodland and forest area that historically supported large populations of wildlife, including elephants, lions, buffaloes, and coastal topi.

The Dodori National Reserve is managed by Kenya Wildlife Service and is part of a larger area that has been recognized globally as an important cultural heritage area and a prized conservation site by international organizations such as the IUCN, Conservation International, World Wildlife Fund, among others. Together with the nearby Kiunga Marine National Reserve, the Dodori National Reserve was named a UNESCO Man and Biosphere Reserve in 1980.
