= Tsavo National Park =

Tsavo National Park may refer to:

- Tsavo East National Park, a national park in Kenya on the eastern side of the A109 road
- Tsavo West National Park, a national park in Kenya on the western side of the A109 road
