= Nairobi National Park =

First national park in Kenya

- Swahili: Hifadhi ya Taifa ya Nairobi
- IUCN category II (national park)
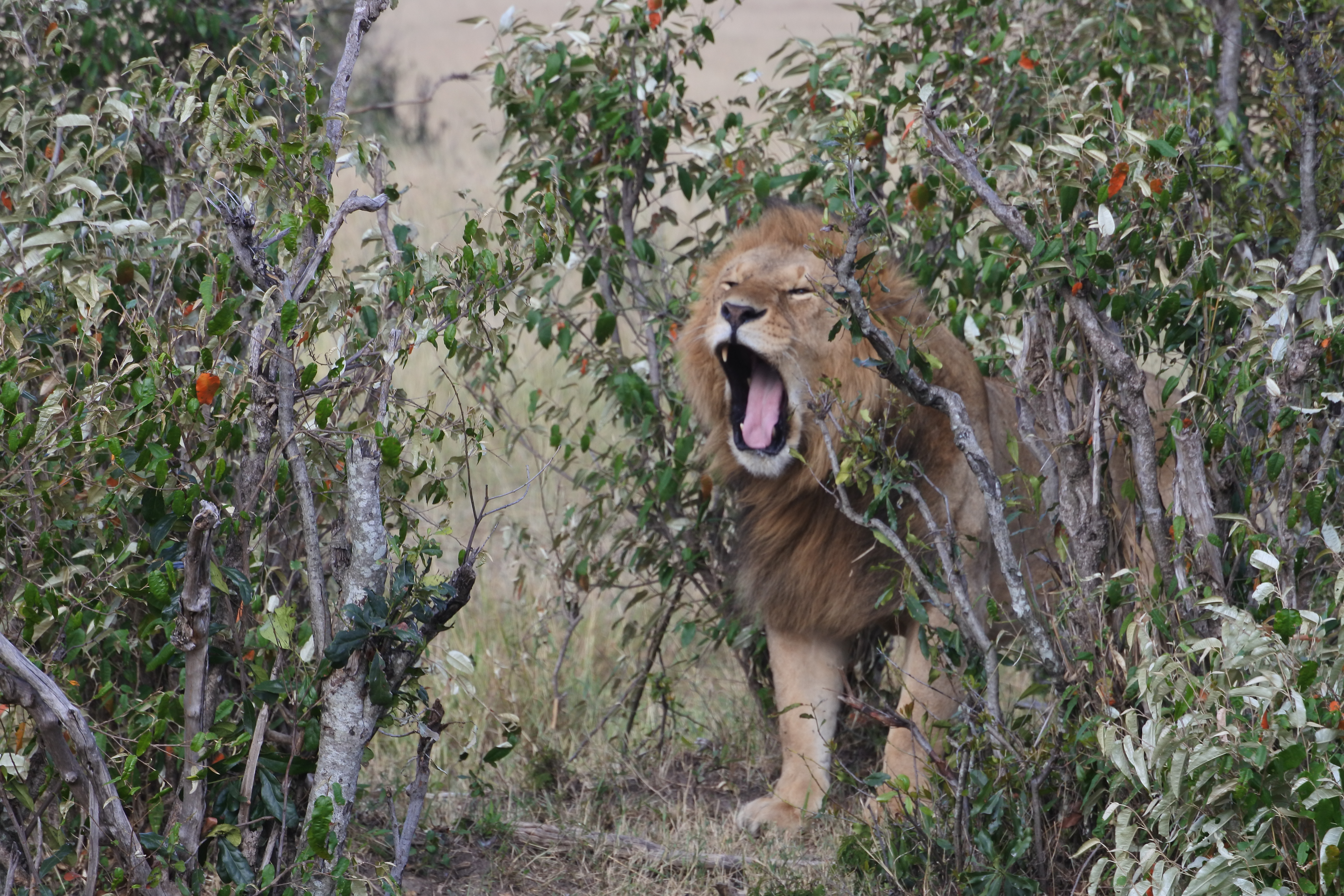
- A lion in Nairobi National Park, December 2016

- Location within Kenya
- Location: Kenya
- Nearest city: Nairobi
- Coordinates: 1°22′24″S 36°51′32″E
- Area: 117 km^{2} (45 sq mi)
- Established: 1946; 80 years ago
- Governing body: Kenya Wildlife Service

Nairobi National Park is a national park in Kenya that was established in 1946 about 7 km (4.3 mi) south of Nairobi. It is fenced on three sides, whereas the open southern boundary allows migrating wildlife to move between the park and the adjacent Kitengela plains. Herbivores gather in the park during the dry season. Nairobi National Park is negatively affected by increasing human and livestock populations, changing land use and poaching of wildlife. Despite its proximity to the city and its relative small size, it boasts a large and varied wildlife population, and is one of Kenya's most successful rhinoceros sanctuaries.

== History ==
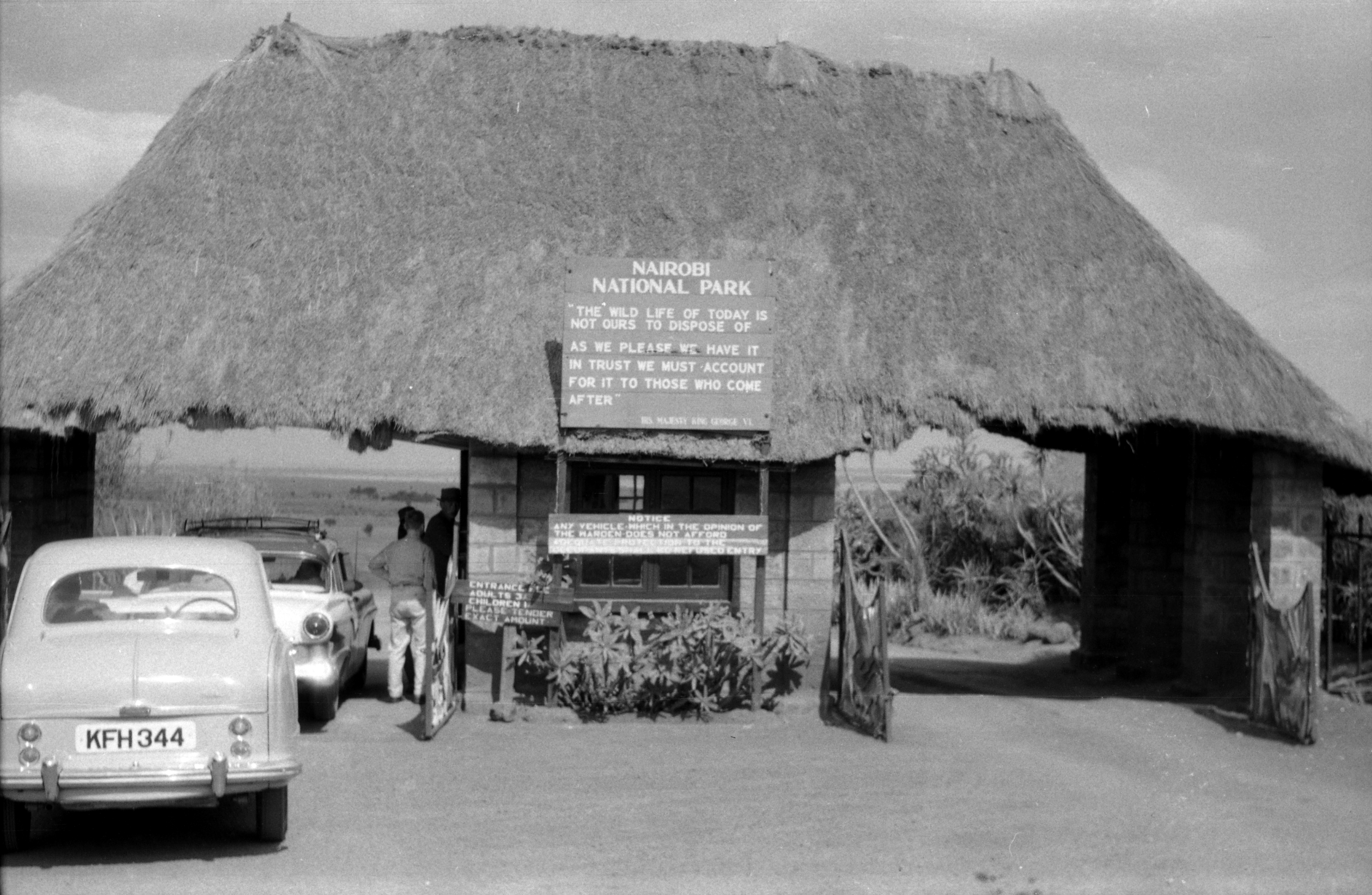
The Park entrance in 1960

British colonists arrived in the area where the park is in the late 19th century. At this time, the Athi plains east and south of what is today Nairobi had plentiful wildlife. Nomadic Maasai lived and herded their cattle among the wildlife. Kikuyu people farmed the forested highlands above Nairobi. As Nairobi grew—it had 14,000 residents by 1910—conflicts between humans and animals increased. Residents of the city carried guns at night to protect against lions. Animals were gradually confined to the expansive plains to the west and south of Nairobi, and the colonial government set this area aside as a game reserve. Settlers from Nairobi including Isak Dinesen, author of Out of Africa, rode horses among gazelles, impala, and zebras in this reserve.

The conservationist Mervyn Cowie was born in Nairobi. Returning to Kenya after a nine-year absence in 1932, he was alarmed to see that the amount of game animals on the Athi plains had dwindled. Expanding farms and livestock had taken the place of the game. He later recalled this place as a paradise that was quickly disappearing. At this time, the area that would later become Nairobi National Park was part of the Southern Game Reserve. Hunting was not permitted in the reserve, but nearly every other activity, including cattle grazing, dumping, and even bombing by the Royal Air Force was allowed. Cowie started to campaign for the establishment of a national park system in Kenya. The government formed a committee to examine the matter.

Officially opened in 1946, Nairobi National Park was the first national park established in Kenya. Maasai pastoralists were removed from their lands when the park was created. Cowie was named as director of Nairobi National Park and held this position until 1966. In 1989, Kenyan President Daniel arap Moi burned twelve tons of ivory on a site within the park. This event improved Kenya's conservation and wildlife protection image.

On 5 March 2024, a Cessna 172 belonging to a flying school crashed into the park after figuring in a mid-air collision with a Dash 8 passenger aircraft operated by Safarilink Aviation, killing all two people aboard the Cessna.

== Geography ==
Nairobi National Park covers an area of 117.21 km^{2} (45.26 sq mi). Its elevation ranges between 1,533 and 1,760 m (5,030 and 5,774 ft). It has a dry climate. The park is the only protected part of the Athi-Kapiti ecosystem, making up less than 10% of this ecosystem. The park has a diverse range of habitats and species.

Nairobi National Park is located about 7 km (4.3 mi) from Nairobi's centre. There is electric fencing around the park's northern, eastern, and western boundaries. Its southern boundary is formed by the Mbagathi River. This boundary is not fenced and is open to the Kitengela Conservation Area and the Athi-Kapiti plains.

== Flora ==
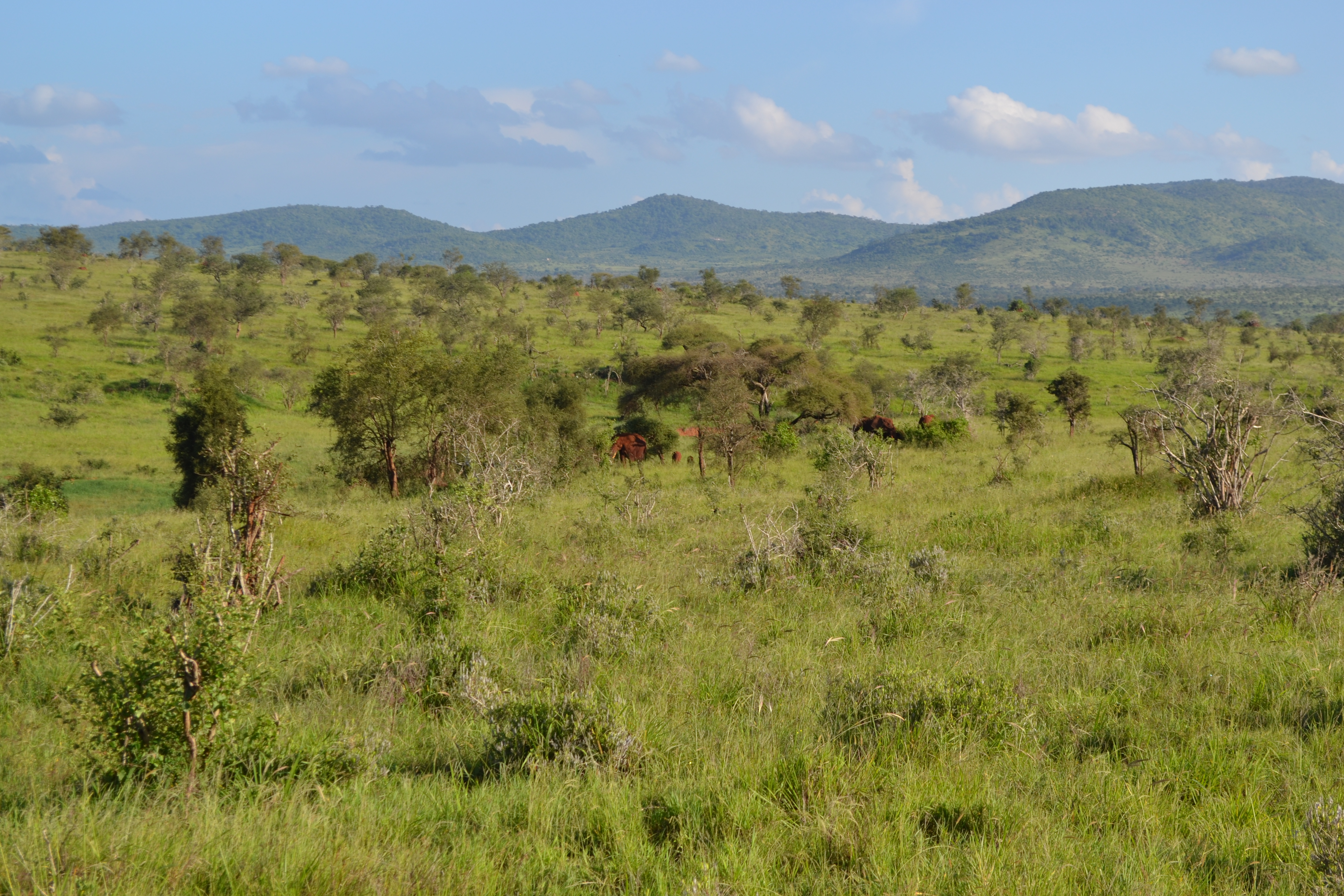
Typical landscape in Nairobi National Park

The park's predominant environment is open grass plain with scattered Acacia bushes. The western uplands of the park have highland dry forest with stands of Olea africana, Croton dichogamus, Brachylaena hutchinsii, and Calodendrum. The lower slopes of these areas are grassland. Themeda, cypress, Digitaria, and Cynodon species are found in these grassland areas. There are also scattered yellow-barked Acacia xanthophloea. There is a riverine forest along the permanent river in the south of the park. There are areas of broken bush and deep rocky valleys and gorges within the park. The species in the valleys are predominantly Acacia and Euphorbia candelabrum. Other tree species include Apodytes dimidiata, Canthium schimperiana, Elaeodendron buchananii, Ficus eriocarpa, Aspilia mossambicensis, Rhus natalensis, and Newtonia species. Several plants that grow on the rocky hillsides are unique to the Nairobi area. These species include Euphorbia brevitorta, Drimia calcarata, and Murdannia clarkeana.

== Fauna ==
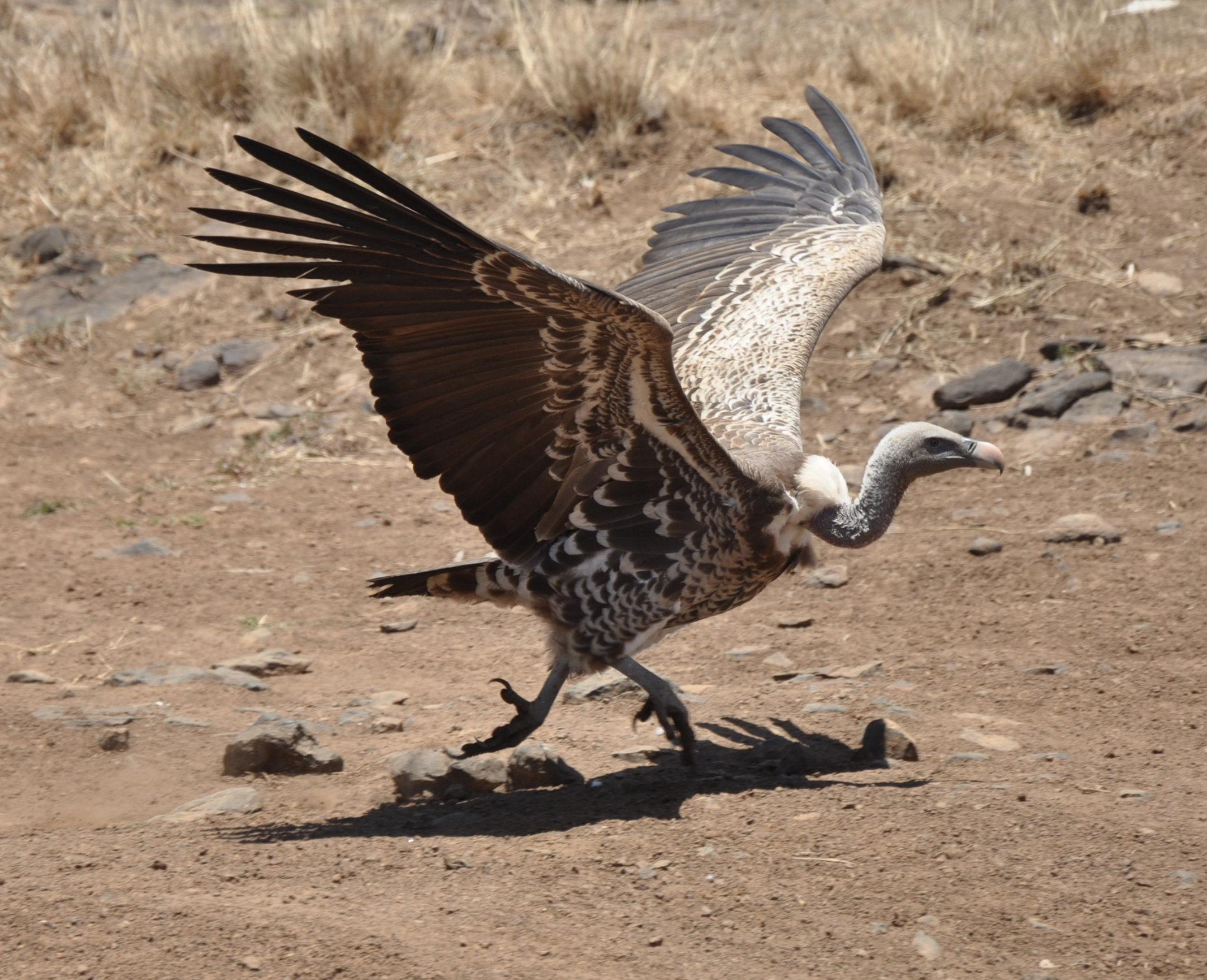
A Rüppell's vulture in the park

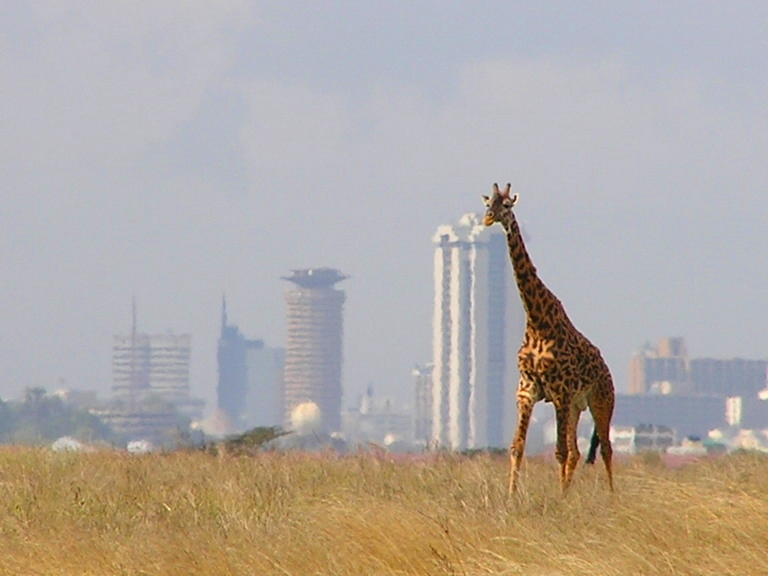
A giraffe in Nairobi National Park, with Nairobi's skyline in the background.

The park has a large and diverse wildlife population. Species found in the park include lion, leopard, African buffalo, black rhinoceros, giraffe, hippopotamus, spotted hyena, African bush elephant, blue wildebeest, plains zebra, cheetah, Thomson's gazelle, Grant's gazelle, common eland, impala, hartebeest, waterbuck, common warthog, olive baboon, black-backed jackal, common ostrich, and Nile crocodile.

Herbivores, including wildebeest and zebra, use the Kitengela conservation area and migration corridor to the south of the park to reach the Athi-Kapiti plains. They disperse over the plains in the wet season and return to the park in the dry season. The concentration of wildlife in the park is greatest in the dry season, when areas outside the park have dried up. Small dams built along the Mbagathi River give the park more water resources than these outside areas. They attract water dependent herbivores during the dry season. The park is the northern limit for wildlife migrations in the dry season. The park has a high diversity of bird species, with up to 500 permanent and migratory species in the park. Dams have created a man-made habitat for birds and aquatic species.

The David Sheldrick Trust runs a sanctuary in the park that hand-rears orphaned elephant and rhinoceros calves, and later releases them back into secure sanctuaries. Orphaned and sick animals are brought to the sanctuary from all over Kenya. The sanctuary is located close to the park's main entrance. It was opened in 1963. It was set up by Daphne Sheldrick after the death of her husband David Sheldrick, the anti-poaching warden of Tsavo National Park. Nairobi National Park is sometimes called Kifaru Ark, which means "Rhinoceros Sanctuary". It is one of Kenya's most successful rhinoceros sanctuaries, and it is one of only a few parks where visitors can be certain of seeing a black rhinoceros in its natural habitat.

== Conservation ==
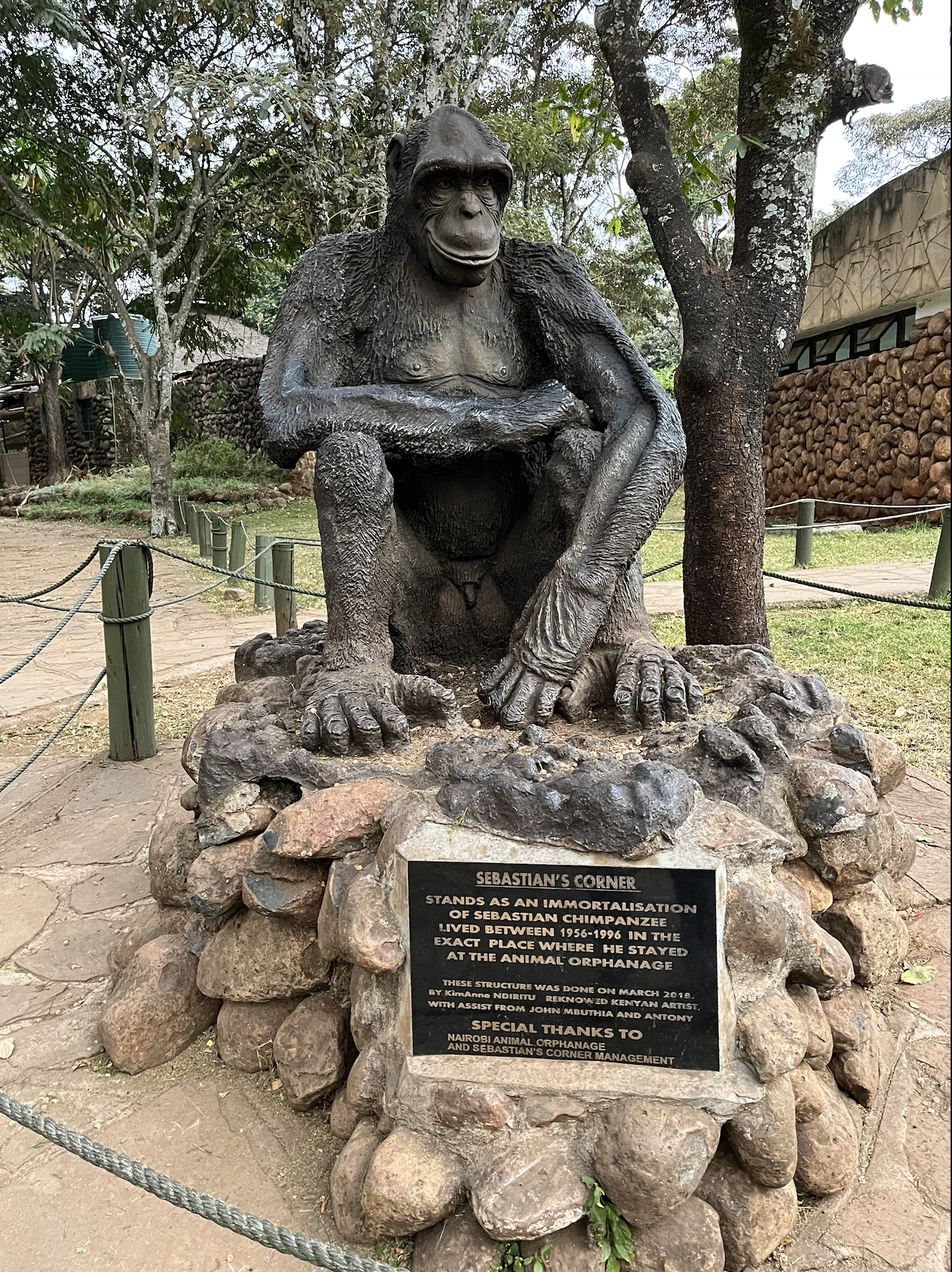
A memorial to Sebastian the chimpanzee who lived at the park's animal orphanage

Mervyn Cowie oversaw the development of several of Kenya's national parks and designed them with human visitors in mind. This emphasis helped to make tourism Kenya's primary industry. However, it exacerbated problems between the human population and wildlife. Farmers living next to the parks did not have input into the establishment of the parks. Locals received very little benefit from the game animals. Livestock is threatened by lions, and some landowners think that Kenya's wildlife is not good for them. In 1948, 188,976 people lived in Nairobi, and by 1997 the city's population had grown to 1.5 million. The park is under pressure from the city's growing population and need for farmland. People live right next to the park's boundaries, which creates human-animal conflicts. The human population also creates pollution and garbage. Effluent and industrial waste from factories located along the park's northern boundary contaminate the park's surface and ground water systems.

Treaties with the Maasai in 1904 and 1911 forced them to give up all of their northern grazing lands on the Laikipia escarpment near Mount Kenya. Some of the people that lost land there were resettled in the Kitengela area. The Maasai's pastoral life did not create any conflicts with the wildlife. Today the Kitengela's former Maasai group-ranches have been privatized and some of the land has been sold to farmers. Houses, cultivated plots, schools, shops, and bars are found on the Kitengela plains. Some of the park's revenues have been used for community projects in order for the people living on the Kitengela to benefit from the presence of the national park. Many Maasai landowners have formed the Kitengela Landowners Association, which works with the Kenyan Wildlife Service to both protect the wildlife and find benefits for the locals.

The park and the Athi-Kapiti Plains are linked by the migrations of wild herbivore populations. The plains to the south of the park are important feeding areas during the wet season. Before the city was established, herds of animals followed the rains and moved across the plains from Mount Kilimanjaro to Mount Kenya, a migration as great as the migration that takes place on the Serengeti. However, as the city grew the park became the northernmost limit of the animal's migration. Migrating animals can reach their southern pastures by travelling through the part of the Athi plains called the Kitengela. This land is very important to their migration routes, but growth in the human population and the accompanying need for land threaten to cut off this traditional migration route from the park to land further south. The park's migratory species are also threatened by changing settlement patterns, fencing, and their closeness to Nairobi and other industrial towns. These activities fragment their ecosystems and occupy their habitat.

Since 2005, the protected area is considered a Lion Conservation Unit.

== Tourism and education ==
Nairobi National Park is the main tourist attraction for visitors to Nairobi. Visitor attractions include the park's diverse bird species, cheetah, hyena, leopard, and lion. Other attractions are the wildebeest and zebra migrations in July and August, the Ivory Burning Site Monument, and the Nairobi Safari Walk and animal orphanage. Inhabitants of Nairobi visit the park and thousands of Kenyan children on school field trips visit the park each week.

The park's Wildlife Conservation Education Centre has lectures and video shows about wildlife and guided tours of the park and animal orphanage. These tours are primarily, but not exclusively, to educate schools and local communities. There has been criticism about animals' housing, and they now have more spacious housing in a more natural environment. The Kenya Wildlife Service has created a Safari Walk that highlights the variety of plants and animals that are in Kenya, and how they affect Kenya's population.

=== Bibliography ===
- Brett, Michael; Christine Riley (1995). Kenya the Beautiful. Struik. ISBN 1-85368-557-7.
- Hodd, Michael (2002). East Africa Handbook: The Travel Guide. Footprint Travel Guides. ISBN 1-900949-65-2.
- Honey, Martha (1999). Ecotourism and Sustainable Development: Who Owns Paradise?. Island Press. ISBN 1-55963-582-7.
- Morell, Virginia (July–August 1996). "Surrounded! – civilization is encroaching on Nairobi National Park in Kenya – Nairobi's Wild Side". International Wildlife. Vol. 26, no. 4. Archived from the original on 15 January 2005.
- Porteous, J. Douglas; Sandra Eileen Smith (2001). Domicide: The Global Destruction of Home. McGill-Queen's Press. ISBN 0-7735-2258-1.
- Prins, Herbert; Jan Geu Grootenhuis; Thomas T. Dolan (2000). Wildlife Conservation by Sustainable Use. Springer. ISBN 0-412-79730-5.
- Riley, Laura; William Riley (2005). Nature's Strongholds: The World's Great Wildlife Reserves. Princeton University Press. ISBN 0-691-12219-9.
