= Watamu Marine National Park =

Marine park in Kenya

Watamu Marine National Park and Reserve
- Hifadhi ya Taifa Bahari ya Watamu
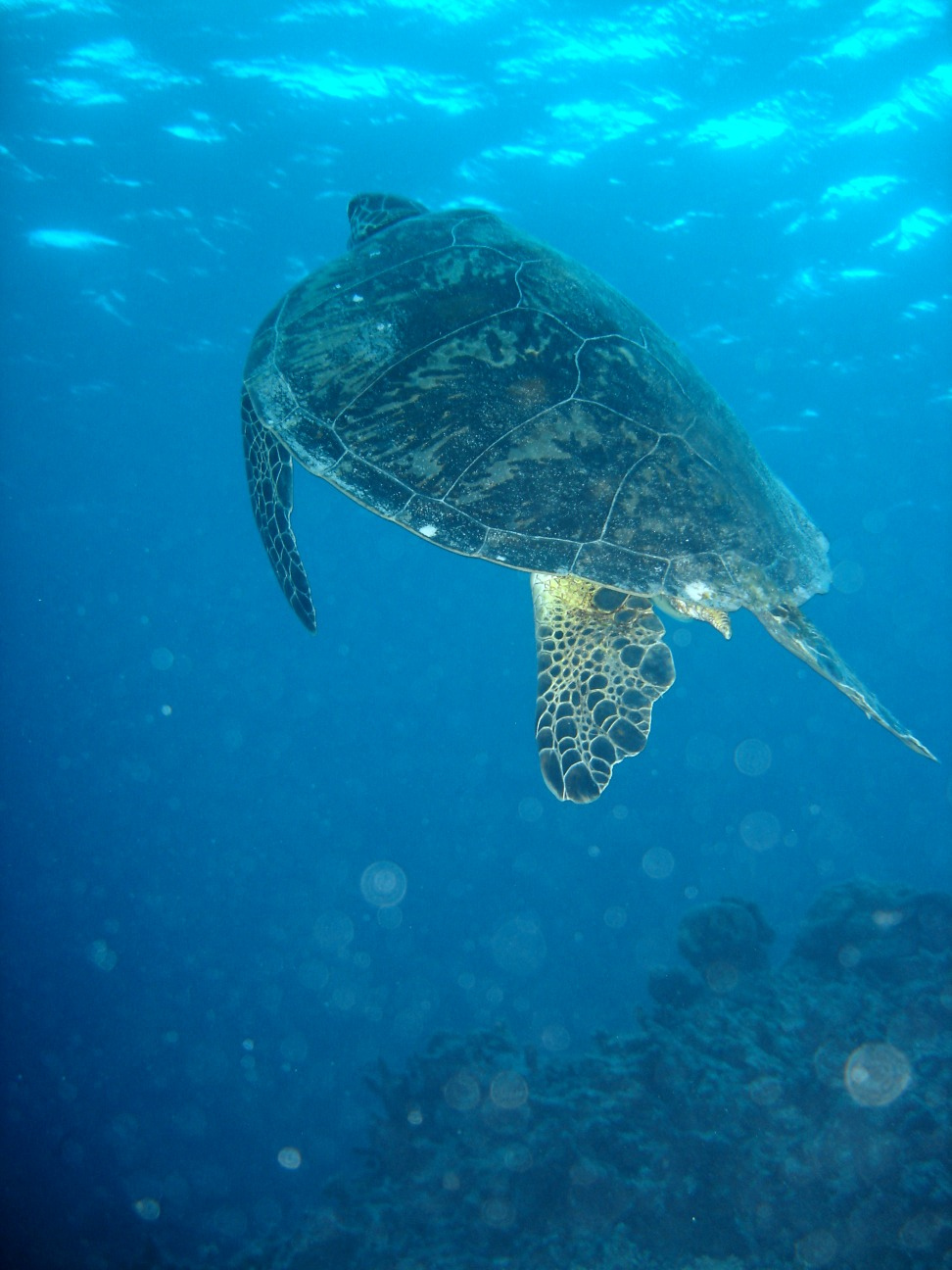
- The green turtle is common in Watamu Marine Park
- Interactive map of Watamu Marine National Park and Reserve
- Location: Watamu, Kenya (300m offshore)
- Nearest city: Malindi, Mombasa
- Coordinates: 3°22′04″S 40°00′59″E
- Established: 1968
- Governing body: Kenya Wildlife Service

Watamu Marine National Park and Reserve is located in Kenya. Established in 1968, it was one of Kenya's first marine parks. It is located about 90 miles (140 km) north of Mombasa, Kenya's second largest city. Its coral gardens are 300 metres (980 ft) from the shore and are home to approximately 600 species of fish, 110 species of stony coral and countless invertebrates, crustaceans and molluscs. Water temperature varies from 20 degrees Celsius (June to November) to 30 degrees Celsius (December to May). The park was designated as a biosphere reserve in 1979.

== History ==
Watamu Marine National Park and Reserve was established in 1968 with Malindi Marine National Park and Reserve. They were established by the Kenyan government. Watamu Marine Park is now part of a UN-recognised World Biosphere Reserve.

== Wildlife ==
The park's coral reefs form the physical and biological backbone of the area. With over 150 species of hard and soft corals, such as brain corals, fan corals and sponges, it provides for abundant nutrients for fish. The main park has over 500 species of fish and the reserve over 1000. There are also whale sharks, manta rays, octopus and barracuda as some of the larger species in the park.

Watamu also has different species of turtles and a turtle watch program which has managed to secure the main park's beach as a 99% viable sea turtle nesting site for endangered sea turtles. This beach is patrolled and monitored vigorously. The turtles nesting in Watamu include the green, hawksbill and olive ridley turtles. The olive ridley species is rare but occasionally comes to the nesting site. Leatherback turtles do not nest in Watamu or Malindi but they pass by through the nearby waters during their migration.

== Conservation ==
Bleaching of the water in Watamu Marine Park, a marine protected area (MPA), occurred between 1997 and 1998. This was the single most important impact on the sea water that caused high levels of mortality to the coral reefs in Malindi and Watamu. Usually recovery is variable and depends on the reefs but Watamu was slower than average in recovery. Surveys showed that urbanization and coastal development, especially from tourism and agricultural sectors, contributed to increased degradation of the marine environment in the area. Removal of forests and natural vegetation for agriculture, removal of mangroves for building and fuel, and fishing to meet the demands of a growing urban population, all contributed to increased threats on the marine ecosystems of the MPA. This ecosystem includes of coral reefs, mangrove forests and sea grass beds. Land-use plans had to be incorporated into the MPA management plan. The inclusion took into consideration issues of coastal destruction of habitats for marine species including marine turtles and shorebirds, as well as improved enforcement of existing land-use statutes. The creek is an important spawning habitat for numerous fish species, an internationally significant wintering site for waders, and a feeding place for several kinds of sea turtles.

In Watamu and Malindi parks, a local marine conservation organisation seeks to protect marine life, especially sea turtles, by the means of a direct payment method program. The program pays local fishermen to tag and release sea turtles caught while fishing. For every turtle release, the fishermen are compensated for their time, efforts and potential damage to fishing gear, thus providing an incentive for releasing the animals instead of killing them. After the fishermen release the turtles, they notify Watamu Turtle Watch (WTW) volunteers who rush to the landing site. The volunteers then have an opportunity to measure and examine the animals as well as place ID tags on them before they are returned to freedom. This program has benefited the research of turtle nesting habits. Also, the center administering the program provides turtle rehabilitation for sick turtles, and has an adopt-a-turtle program, and studies the socio-economics of fishing communities. Fishermen are also allowed to fish in the protected reserve as long as they only take out the species of fish allowed by the park and use traditional methods of fishing. Consequently, there may be a trade-off between economic growth and environmental conservation.

== Bibliography ==
- http://www.cia.gov
- http://www.turtles.org
- http://www.iucnredlist.org
- http://www.seaturtle.org/mtn/archives/mtn105
- http://www.watamuturtles.com
- "Environmental Biology of Fishes." Journal of Earth and Environmental Science Springer Netherlands. Volume 70. August 2004.
- Protected Areas of the World: Afrotropical: A Review of National Systems By World Conservation Monitoring Centre, IUCN Commission on National Parks and Protected Areas, International Union for Conservation of Nature and Natural Resources, British Petroleum Company Edition: illustrated Published by IUCN, 1992 ISBN 978-2-8317-0092-2, 384 pages
