= Malka Mari National Park =

National park in Mandera County, Kenya

- Hifadhi ya Taifa ya Malka Mari
- IUCN category II (national park)
- Location within Kenya
- Coordinates: 4.1849942°N 40.7712194°E
- Area: 1,500 km^{2} (580 sq mi)
- Established: 1989

Malka Mari National Park is a national park of Kenya, situated along the Dawa River on the Kenya-Ethiopia border. It is approximately 1,500 square kilometres (370,000 acres) in size. It is accessible via the Mandera Airport, and is probably the least visited national park in the nation.

The park is mostly semi-arid bushland and scrubby grassland with riparian woodland and along the river. There are plants in the park that are unique to the area.

Some of the animals that live in the park are the Somali giraffe, crocodile, hyena, agama lizards, antelopes, vultures, dik-dik, Nile crocodiles, zebra and genet. Recently, the first East African population of Hamadryas baboons (Papio hamadryas) was confirmed at Malka Mari.

Many species of birds can be found here, including the Mourning collared dove (Streptopelia decipiens), the Spotted palm thrush (Cichladusa guttata), the Juba weaver (Ploceus dichrocephalus), and the rare Brown-necked raven (Corvus ruficollis), White-winged collared dove (Streptopelia reichenowi), and Black-billed wood hoopoe (Phoeniculus somaliensis).

Malka Mari is an IUCN Category II park designated in 1989.
