= Boni National Reserve =

Nature reserve in Kenya

Boni National
- Location within Kenya
- Location: North Eastern Province, Kenya
- Nearest city: Ijara
- Coordinates: 01°34′04″S 41°18′53″E
- Area: 1,339 km^{2} (517 sq mi)
- Established: 1976
- Governing body: Kenya Wildlife Service

The Boni National Reserve is a national reserve for conservation and lies in the Garissa County, Kenya. The reserve covers an area of 1,339 km^{2} (517 sq mi) and is managed by Kenya Wildlife Service. It was gazetted in 1976 as a dry season sanctuary for elephants in the former Kenyan Ijara, and Lamu districts and Somalia. The elephant population has been greatly reduced by poaching.

On December 28, 2010, the U.S. Department of State Bureau of Consular Affairs included the Boni National Reserve on the list of Kenyan areas American travelers should avoid because of terrorism and violent crime.

== Vegetation ==
The Boni forest, after which the reserve is named, is an indigenous open canopy forest and part of the Northern Zanzibar-Inhambane coastal forest mosaic. . Harbouring densities of plant species that are among the highest in the world, the forest has been declared a biodiversity hotspot.

== Wildlife ==
Common herbivores in the region include hippopotamus, bushpig, warthog, buffalo, common duiker, topi and waterbuck. Common carnivores in the reserve are the vulnerable African wild dog and the aardwolf. Although extremely rare, African elephants are also present in the reserve.

== Birds ==
As part of the East African coastal forest, it is likely to hold bird species characteristic of the coastal forests of eastern Africa, possibly including globally threatened species such as Sokoke pipit.

== Al Shabaab Hide-out ==
The government of Kenya believes that Boni National Reserve has become a hide-out for the Al Shabaab, a terrorist organization based in Somalia This has led to several armed incursions into the reserve by the Kenya Defence Force and Kenya Police. In early 2017, US troops were reportedly giving Kenya assistance in attempts to remove Al Shabaab from the reserve .
