= Malindi Marine National Park =

Kenyan national park in the Indian Ocean

- Hifadhi ya Taifa ya Bahari Malindi
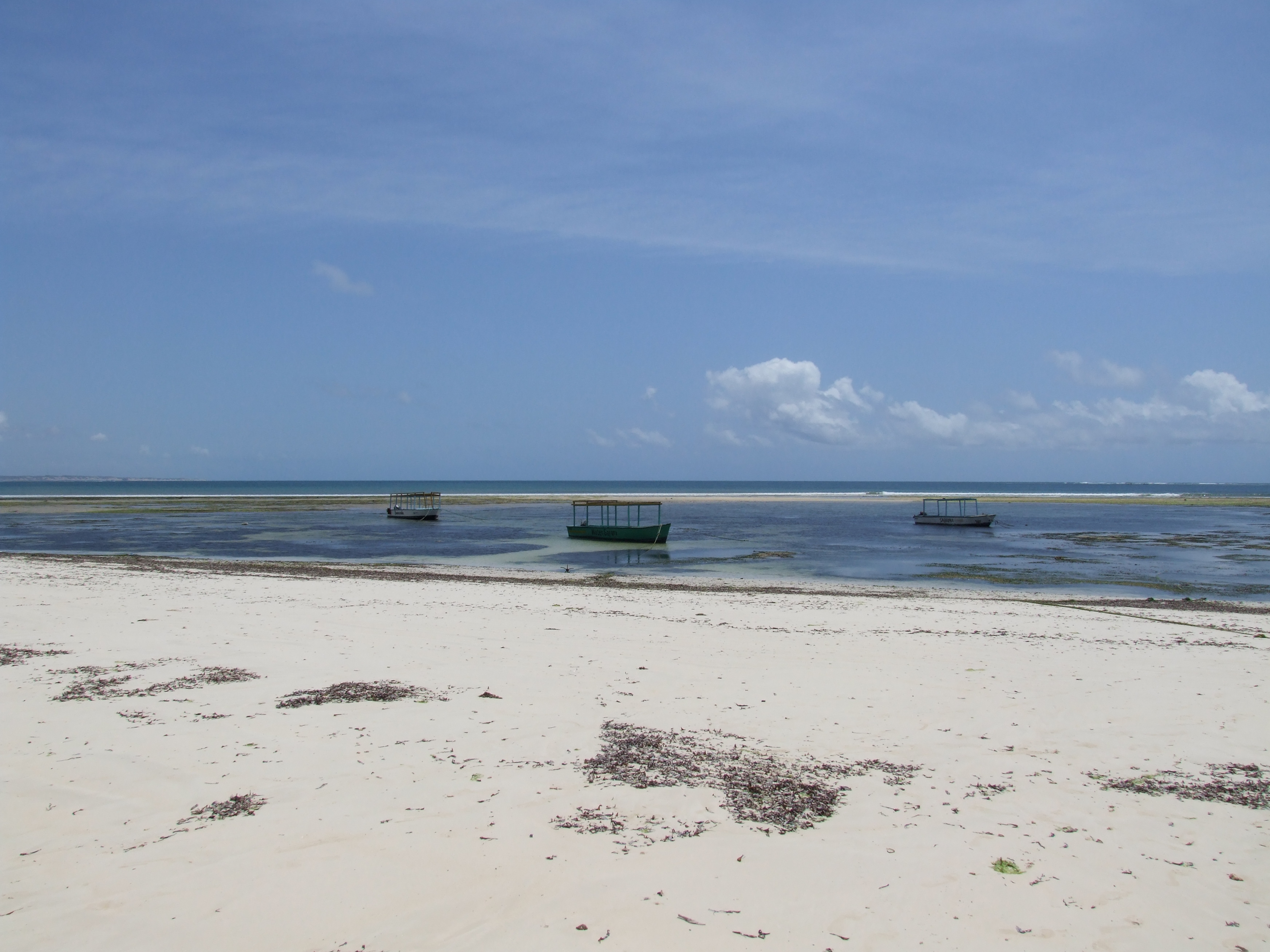

- Location within Kenya
- Location: Malindi, Kenya
- Nearest city: Mombasa
- Coordinates: 3.2556°S 40.1433°E
- Governing body: Kenya Wildlife Service
- Website: www.kws.org/parks/parks_reserves/MAMR.html

Malindi Marine National Park is located in the Indian Ocean, off the coast of Kenya. It is claimed to be the oldest marine park in Africa. The park lies at Malindi, about 118 km north of Mombasa, and is protected and administered by the Kenya Wildlife Service. Along with Watamu Marine National Park, Malindi Marine Park is enclosed by the Malindi Marine National Reserve.

== Wildlife ==
The park's attractions include coral reefs, tropical fish, barracuda, turtles and dolphins.

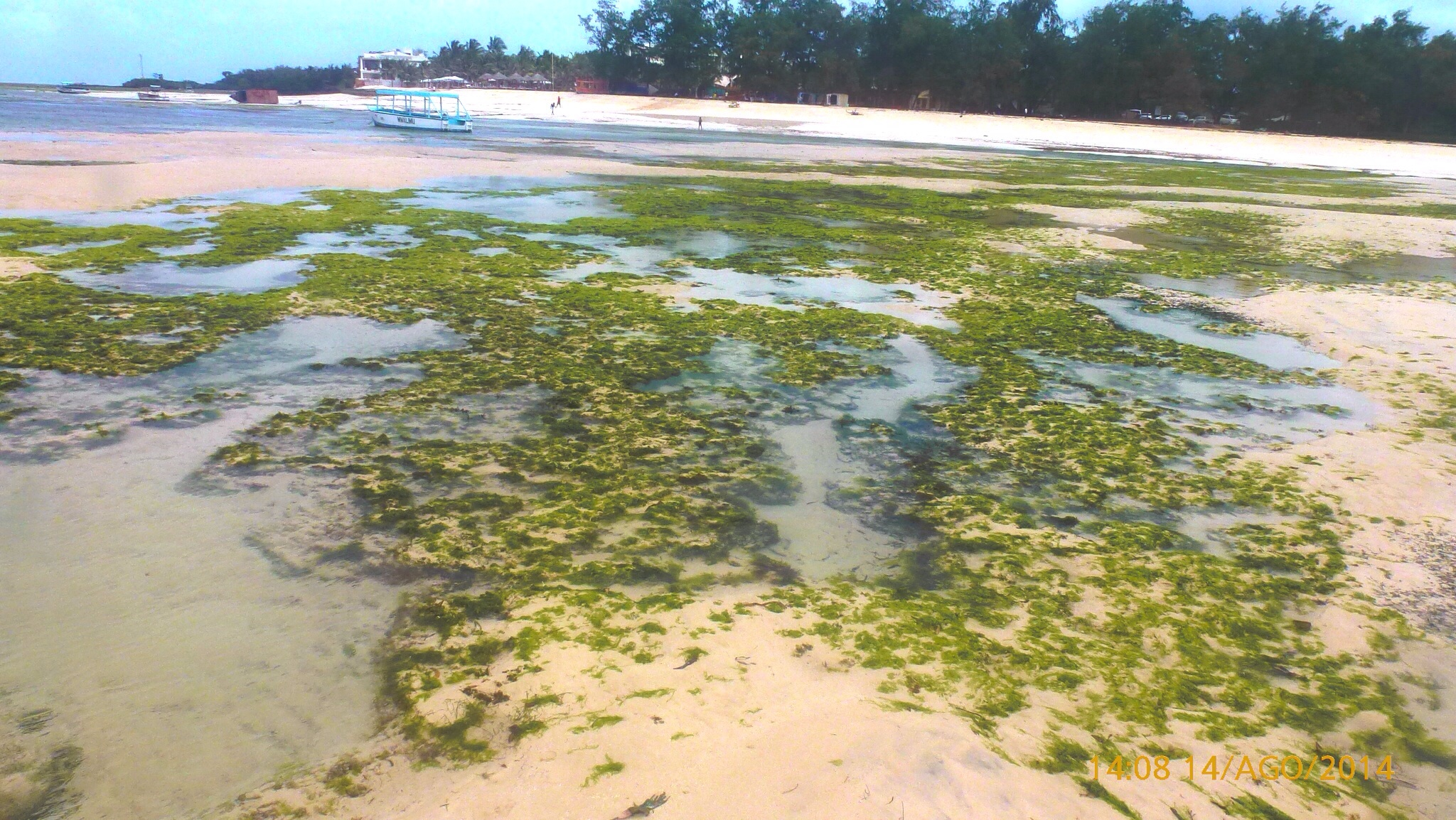
Reef in Malindi
