= Kora National Park =

National park in Kenya

- Hifadhi ya Taifa ya Kora
- IUCN category II (national park)
- Location within Kenya
- Location: Tana River County, Kenya
- Nearest city: Garissa
- Coordinates: 0°12′31″S 38°44′10″E
- Area: 1,788 km^{2} (690 sq mi)
- Established: 1989
- Governing body: Kenya Wildlife Service

Kora National Park is located in Tana River County, Kenya. The park covers an area of 1,788 km^{2} (690 sq mi). It is located 125 km (78 mi) east of Mount Kenya. The park was initially gazetted as a nature reserve in 1973. It was gazetted as a national park in 1989, following the murder of George Adamson by poachers.

Meru National Park and the Tana River mark 65 km (40 mi) of the park's northern boundary. Features of the Tana River include Adamson's Falls, Grand Falls and the Kora rapids. Its eastern boundary is marked by the Mwitamvisi River. The park has several seasonal rivers.

The topography of the park slopes gently from an altitude of 490 m (1,610 ft) in the south-west to an altitude of about 270 m (890 ft) in the north-east. The central area of the park is an undulating peneplain. Basement ridges protrude above the surface of the peneplain as rocky inselbergs, domed hills or hard rocks that rise steeply from the surrounding area. The highest of these inselbergs are Mansumbi (488 m (1,601 ft)), Kumbulanwa (450 m (1,480 ft)) and Kora Rock (442 m (1,450 ft)). The cracks and crevices in the inselbergs have become filled with soil, and a wide variety of herbs, shrubs and small wind-blown trees have become established in them.

There is a wide variety of animal species in the park, including the caracal, Tanzanian cheetah, African bush elephant, genet, hippopotamus, spotted and striped hyenas, African leopard, lion, serval, wildcat and several types of antelope. The vegetation in the park is mostly acacia bushland. There are also riverine forests of doum palm and Tana River poplar.

The park had serious problems with poachers in the 1980s and 1990s. George Adamson and two of his assistants were murdered by poachers in the park in 1989. Adamson is buried in the park with three lions he released.

Efforts to restart the park were culminating in 2012 when the British actor Martin Clunes filmed a four month old orphaned lion cub being introduced to the compound; the first in 22 years. The cub, named Mugie, was around a year old when hyenas attacked it, inflicting internal injuries from which it did not recover.
