= Kisite-Mpunguti Marine National Park =

National park in Kenya

- Hifadhi ya Taifa Bahari ya Kisite-Mpunguti
- IUCN category II (national park)
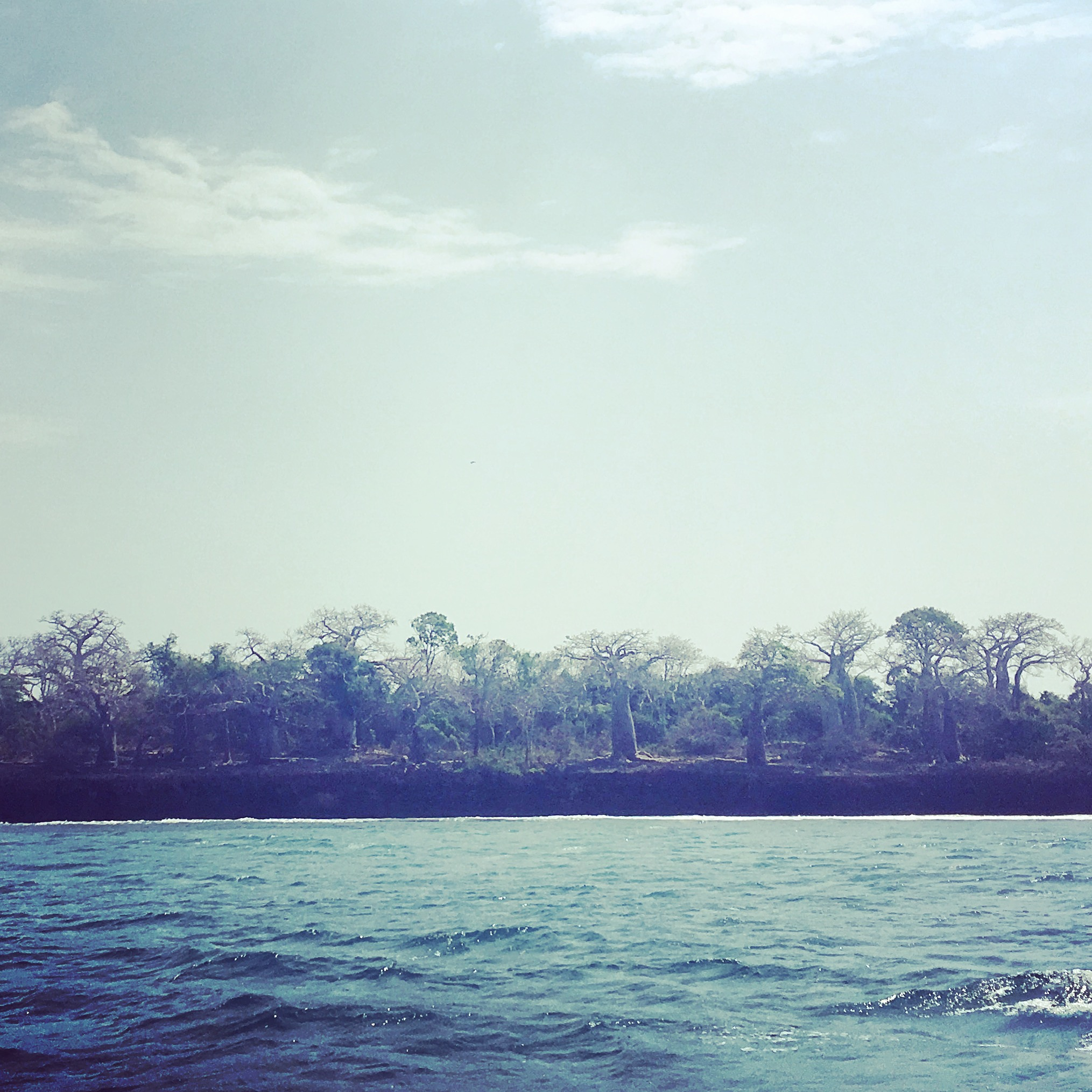
- Kisite-Mpunguti Marine National Park, January 2018

- Location within Kenya
- Location: Coast Province, Kenya
- Nearest city: Mombasa
- Coordinates: 04°42′50″S 39°21′44″E
- Area: 39 km^{2} (15 sq mi): Kisite Park: 28 km^{2} (11 sq mi); Mpunguti Reserve: 11 km^{2} (4.2 sq mi)
- Established: 1973
- Governing body: Kenya Wildlife Service

Kisite-Mpunguti Marine National Park was established in 1978 by the Kenyan government and it is Kenya's first Blue Park.

Kisite is situated on the southern coast of Kenya near Shimoni and south of Wasini Island in Kwale County near the Tanzanian border. Kisite park covers 11 square kilometres (4.2 sq mi) while Mpunguti reserve covers 28 square kilometres (11 sq mi).

The park covers an area with four small islands surrounded by a coral reef.

Marine life is in abundance, including trigger fish, moray eels, angelfish, butterfly fish, groupers, parrotfish, wrasses, scorpionfish, pufferfish, damselfish, rays, snappers, green sea turtles, hawksbill turtles, and dolphins. Humpback whales and whale sharks are seasonal.

Kisite was awarded a gold level Blue Park Award by Marine Conservation Institute in December 2021 for achieving the highest science-based standards for marine life protection and management.
