= Saiwa Swamp National Park =

National park in Rift Valley Province, Kenya

- Hifadhi ya Taifa Kinamasi ya Saiwa
- IUCN category II (national park)
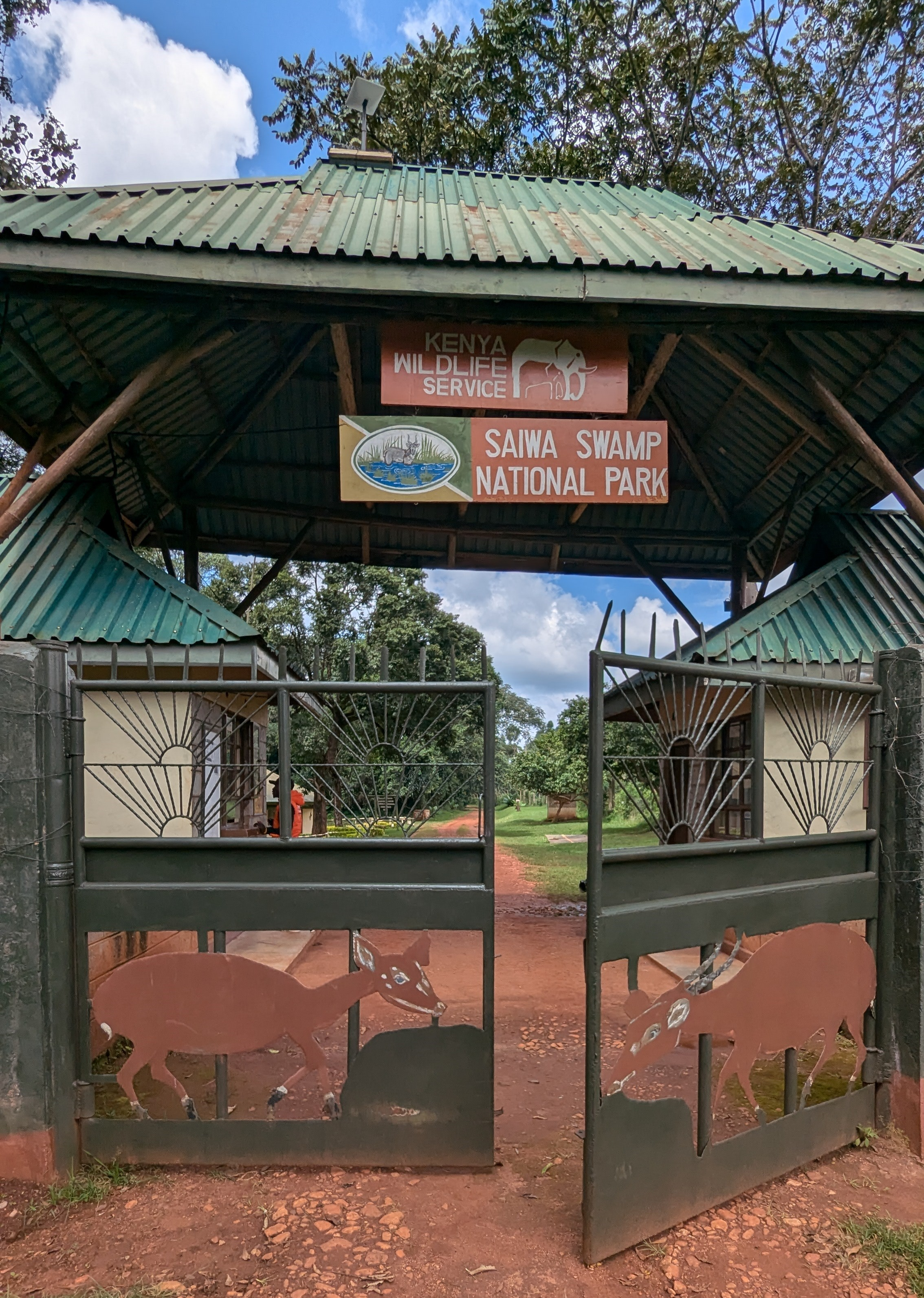
- Main gate

- Location within Kenya
- Location: Rift Valley Province, Kenya
- Nearest city: Kitale
- Coordinates: 1°6′N 35°7′E
- Area: 3 km^{2} (1.2 sq mi)
- Established: 1974
- Governing body: Kenya Wildlife Service

Saiwa Swamp National Park is located near Kitale, in Trans-Nzoia County, Rift Valley Province, Kenya. It is the smallest national park in Kenya, only 3 km^{2} (1.2 sq mi), and was created as a habitat for the Sitatunga, a rare aquatic antelope. There is a variety of wildlife at the park, including trees, birds, insects and reptiles.

== Sitatunga antelopes at Saiwa Swamp ==
The Saiwa Swamp National Park is mostly known for the Sitatunga antelope (Tragelaphus spekii), a notable example of a swamp-dwelling antelope. The Sitatunga exhibits a range of specialized adaptations suited to its unique habitat. Distinguished by its elongated, splayed hooves, the sitatunga is adept at navigating through muddy, vegetated swamplands. However, these adaptations render it relatively clumsy and vulnerable on firmer terrain. Organizations such as the African Wildlife Foundation are known to implement conservation efforts in order to keep these animals from going extinct.
