= Mwea National Reserve =

Nature reserve in Kenya

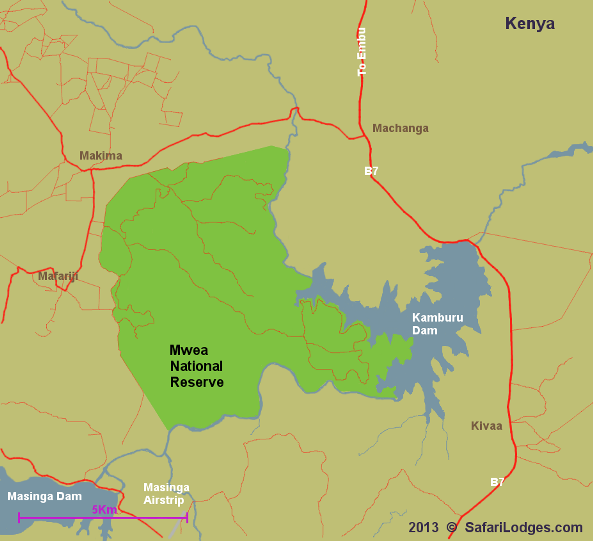
- Location of Mwea National Reserve
- Interactive map of Mwea National Reserve
- Location: Embu County, Kenya
- Nearest town: Kiritiri
- Coordinates: 0°49′05″S 37°37′19″E
- Area: 42 km^{2} (16 sq mi)
- Established: 1976; 50 years ago
- Governing body: Kenya Wildlife Service
- Website: www.kws.org/parks/parks_reserves/MWNR.html

The Mwea National Reserve is a Kenyan national reserve located south of Embu. Its altitude ranges between 1,000 and 1,100 m (3,300 and 3,600 ft), dominated by the Acacia-Commiphora bushland on the north shore of Kamburu Reservoir, at the confluence of Tana and Thiba Rivers. The other vegetation is mixed among the scattered large trees (Acacia species and baobab trees), typical savannah ecosystem. Open grasslands are dominant along the main rivers, with occasional thick undergrowth, as well as a riparian or riverine woodland.

== Wildlife ==
Game species range from African elephants, lesser kudus, Nile crocodiles, giraffes, Grant's zebras, buffalos, African leopards, common duikers, black-backed jackals, bushbucks, waterbucks, Sykes' monkeys, warthogs, rock hyraxes, bush pigs, impalas and hartebeests. Striped ground squirrels, Common Genet Cat and yellow baboons are also found in Mwea.

== Bird watching ==
Renowned for its water birds and waders, over 200 species of birds have been recorded in the reserve, warranted it to be an Important Bird Area (IBA). The reserve is the only protected area in which the globally threatened and Kenya-endemic Hinde's babbler (Turdoides hindei) is known to occur. Mwea National Reserve also shelters two other rare species; the Pel's fishing owl (Scotopelia peli) and the white-backed night heron (Gorsachius leuconotus). The Malagasy pond heron (Ardeola idae) is also a common sighting. Mwea National Reserve is a birding paradise with numerous species of birds of prey, including the African Fish Eagle, White-headed Vulture, and Pele's Fishing Owl. Other predators like Augur Buzzards and various kestrels~ Grey Kestrel (Falco ardosiaceus) and falcons~ Lanner Falcon (Falco biarmicus) are also present. The reserve's diverse habitats, from open savannah to wetlands, attract a wide range of raptors.

== Camps ==
The reserve has seven campsites: Mbogo, Silvester, Mavuria, Kyangosi, Hippo-Point, Kanyonga and Githechu. Picnic sites allow you to relax in nature, perhaps near the rivers or with a view of the open bush.

== Other attractions ==
These include game viewing, boat rides at Kamburu Dam, hippo sighting at Hippo Point, bird watching and walking (walking circuit).

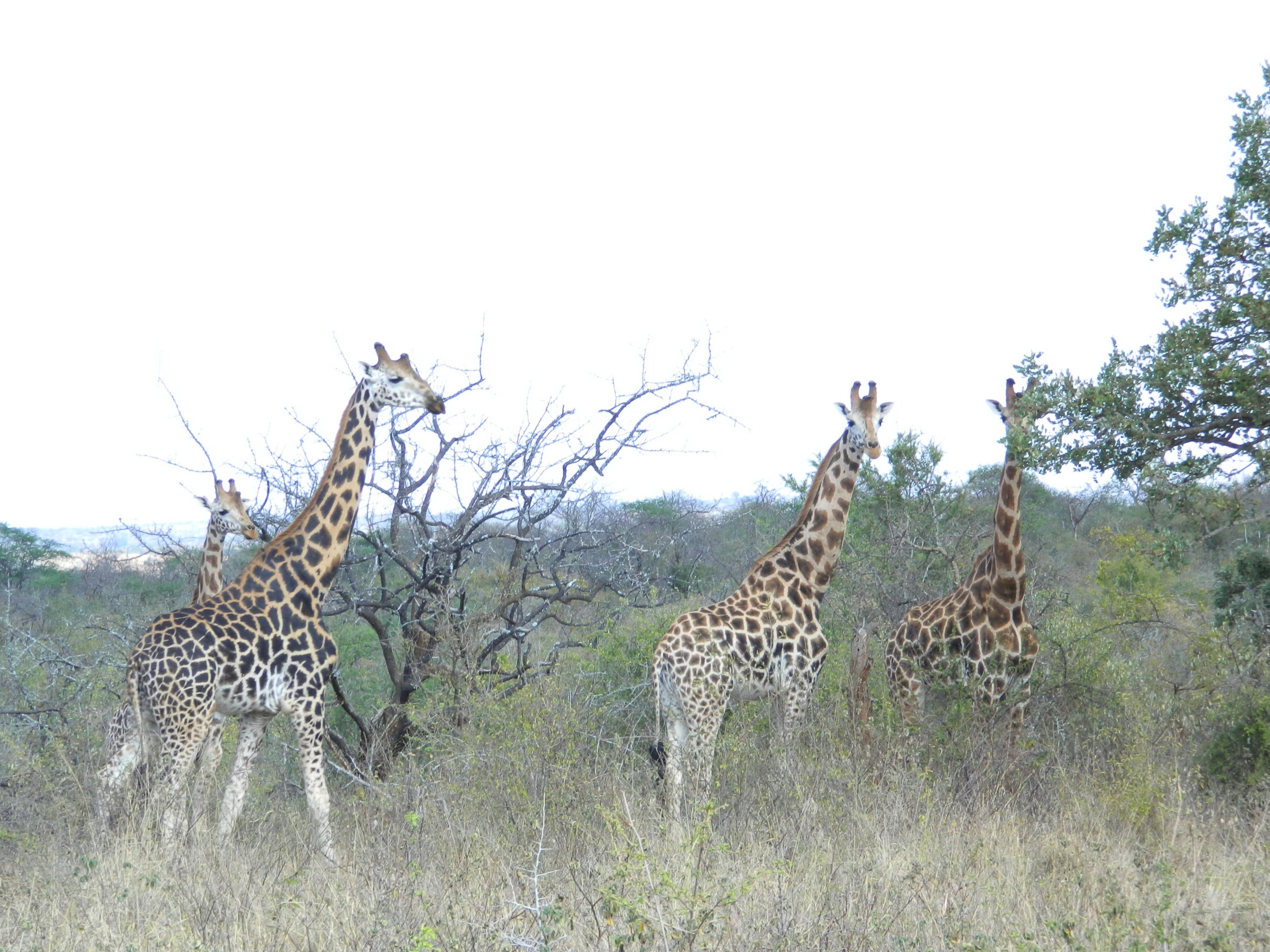
Giraffes in the Mwea National Reserve
