= Mombasa Marine National Park and Reserve =

Kenyan game park

Mombasa Marine National Park
- Hifadhi ya Taifa Bahari ya Mombasa
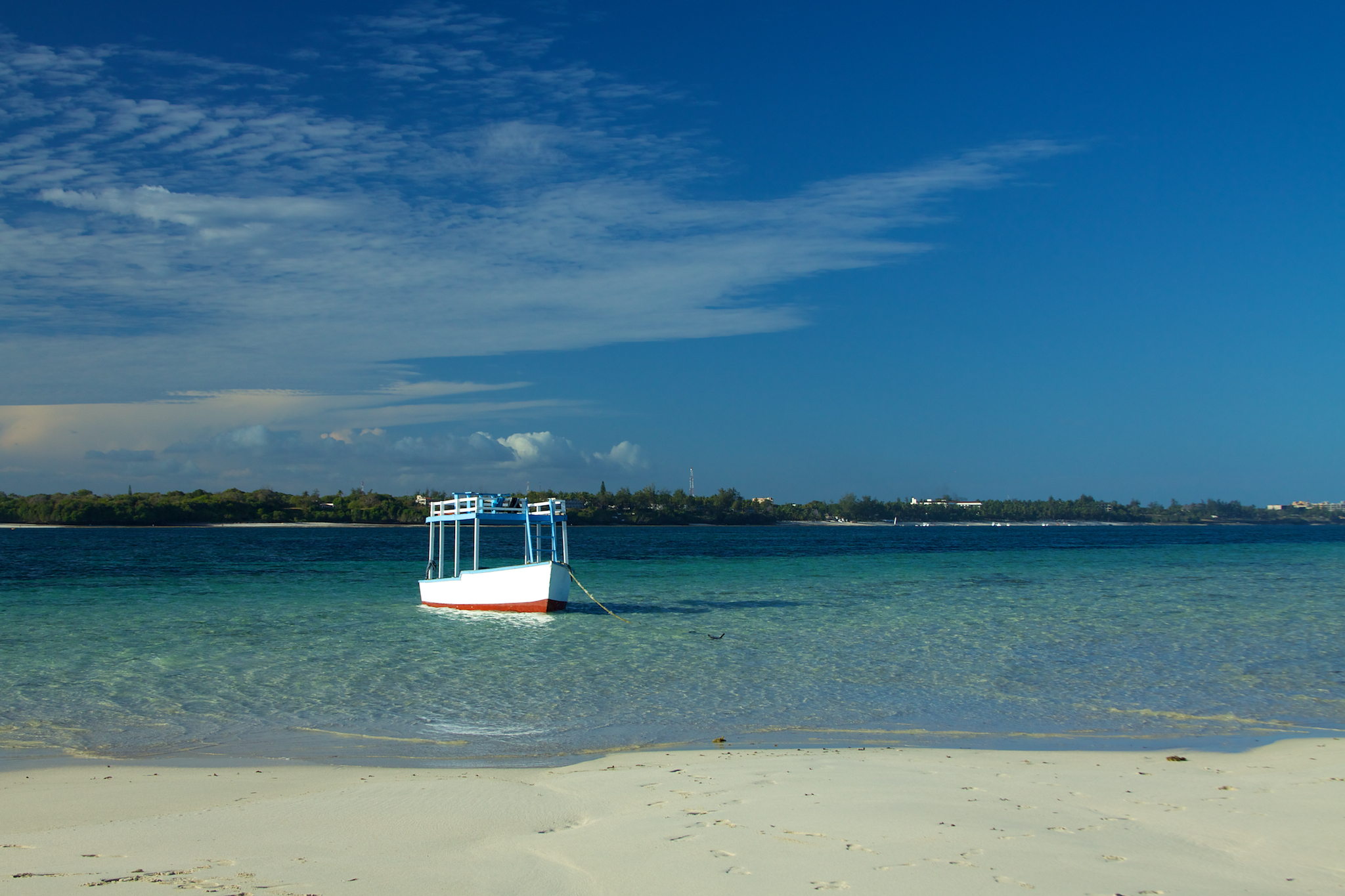
- Mombasa Marine Park

- Location within Kenya
- Coordinates: 4°4′S 39°47′E
- Area: 10 km^{2} (3.9 sq mi)
- Established: 1986

Mombasa Marine National Park and Reserve is a marine park and national reserve in Mombasa, Kenya. The park is 10 km^{2} (2,500 acres) while the reserve is 200 km^{2} (49,400 acres).

It is located on the coast near tourist areas and is a popular beach because of the snorkeling and diving; other activities include taking a boat ride, recreational fishing, windsurfing, water skiing, and viewing the other wildlife on land and underwater. It is the most frequently visited of Kenya's marine parks. It has coral reefs in its waters. The reserve also provide a home to a variety of marine species including crabs, starfish, stone fish, cucumbers sea urchins, corals, turtles, sea grasses and migratory birds including crab plovers.

The Marine park is characterized by warm tropical conditions varying at the surface between 25 °C and 31 °C during the year, stable salinity regimes and moderate nutrient levels.

== History ==
Through legislation in 1987, the area was officially recognized as a National Park to prevent damage to both the park and the communities surrounding the park due to over-fishing, coral reef stripping, and revenue lost resulting from less tourism. The park was also recognized as a marine park to protect the coral reefs and animals who were the target of fishing and trophy-hunting. While the legislation was supposed to protect wildlife and marine-life, fishing and poaching persisted. In 1992, night-time patrols were introduced to curb wildlife poaching and legislation was introduced to ban fishing; it wasn't until 1994 when both poaching and fishing ceased and the area was under full protection.
