= Meru National Park =

Kenyan game park

- Hifadhi ya Taifa ya Meru
- IUCN category II (national park)

- Location within Kenya
- Location: Eastern Province, Kenya
- Nearest city: Meru
- Coordinates: 0°5′37″N 38°12′29″E
- Area: 870.44 km^{2} (336.08 sq mi)
- Established: 1966
- Governing body: Kenya Wildlife Service
- Website: www.kws.org/parks/parks_reserves/MENP.html

Meru National Park is a Kenyan national park located east of Meru, 350 km (220 mi) from Nairobi. Covering an area of 870 km^{2} (340 sq mi), it is one best known national parks in Kenya. Rainfall in this area is abundant with 635–762 mm (25–30 in) in the west of the park and 305–356 mm (12–14 in) in the east resulting in tall grass and lush swamps.

The park has a wide range of wild animals including the African bush elephant, lion, African leopard, cheetah, eastern black rhinoceros, southern white rhinoceros, Grévy's zebra, hippopotamus.

Meru was one of the two areas in which conservationists George Adamson and Joy Adamson raised Elsa the Lioness made famous in the best selling book and award-winning movie Born Free. Elsa the Lioness is buried in this park and part of Joy's ashes were scattered on her gravesite.

== History ==
Between the years 2000 and 2005, the Kenya Wildlife Service, helped by the Agence Française de Développement (AFD) and International Fund for Animal Welfare (IFAW), restored Meru National Park from near ruin to one of the most promising tourist destinations in Eastern Africa, solving the parks poaching problem. IFAW donated $1.25 million to this major restoration project, and with this money aided in improving the basic infrastructure and provided essential equipment and vehicles for law enforcement activities.

Since 2005, the protected area is considered part of an Lion Conservation Unit.
