= Sheldrick =

Sheldrick is a surname. Notable people with the surname include:

- Angus Sheldrick (born 2003), Australian rules footballer
- Daphne Sheldrick (1934–2018), Kenyan author, conservationist, and animal husbandry expert
- David Sheldrick (1919–1977), Kenyan farmer and park warden
- George M. Sheldrick (1942–2025), British and German chemist
- J.G. Sheldrick (fl. c. early 20th century), U.S. surveyor (see Max, North Dakota)
- John Sheldrick (born 1939), English athlete
- Michael Sheldrick (born 1988), Australian author and policy entrepreneur
- William Sheldrick Conover, the II (1928–2022), U.S. politician

== See also ==
- David Sheldrick Wildlife Trust, Kenyan wildlife conservation charity
- Sheldrick Forest Preserve, in New Hampshire, U.S.
- Sheldrick Redwine (born 1996), American football safety
