= Hyperolius sheldricki =

Conservation status
- Data Deficient (IUCN 3.1)

Scientific classification
- Kingdom: Animalia
- Phylum: Chordata
- Class: Amphibia
- Order: Anura
- Family: Hyperoliidae
- Genus: Hyperolius
- Species: H. sheldricki

Binomial name
- Hyperolius sheldricki Duff-MacKay and Schiøtz, 1971

Synonyms
- Hyperolius viridiflavus sheldricki — Laurent, 1976

Species of amphibian

Hyperolius sheldricki (common names: Sheldrick's reed frog, Aruba Dam reed frog) is a species of small frog in the family Hyperoliidae. It is endemic to southeast Kenya. The type locality is in the Tsavo East National Park.

== Etymology ==
The specific name sheldricki honours David Sheldrick, warden of Tsavo East National Park, "in appreciation of his invaluable help and hospitality over many years on occasions when we [Duff-MacKay and Schiøtz] ... have been at Tsavo".

== Taxonomy ==
Hyperolius sheldricki belongs to the Hyperolius viridiflavus species complex, and there is debate whether it warrants a full species status.

== Description ==
Males measure 18–24 mm (0.71–0.94 in) in snout–vent length. The vocal sac is very large and has a large, protective flap. The toes have extensive webbing. There is a fairly conspicuous conical protuberance in the upper eyelid. Regarding the colouration, there are two phases. Males in the "female" phase have dark brown stripes on a light brown background. Scattered over the back and upper parts of the arms and legs, there are dark brown spots. The belly is white. The hands, feet, femur, and tibia a dark maroon in their undersides. For males in the "juvenile" phase, the dorsum is a more or less uniform and whitish.

== Habitat and conservation ==
This species occurs in emergent vegetation at the margins of swamps, rivers and lakes in a variety of habitats (dry savanna, shrubland, and grassland, as well as many anthropogenic habitats, including cultivated land). It spreads rapidly into new waterbodies. Breeding takes place in ponds (from very small to very large), usually temporary ones. The eggs are laid directly into the water. Males have been found calling in grass bordering or in temporary ponds within few days from the first heavy rains after dry periods.

The species is known with certainty from only two localities, one of them in the Tsavo East National Park, but presumably occurs more widely. The IUCN SSC Amphibian Specialist Group has assessed the species as "Data Deficient".

== See also ==
- African reed frogs
- Amphibian conservation
