= Dutch Shepherd =

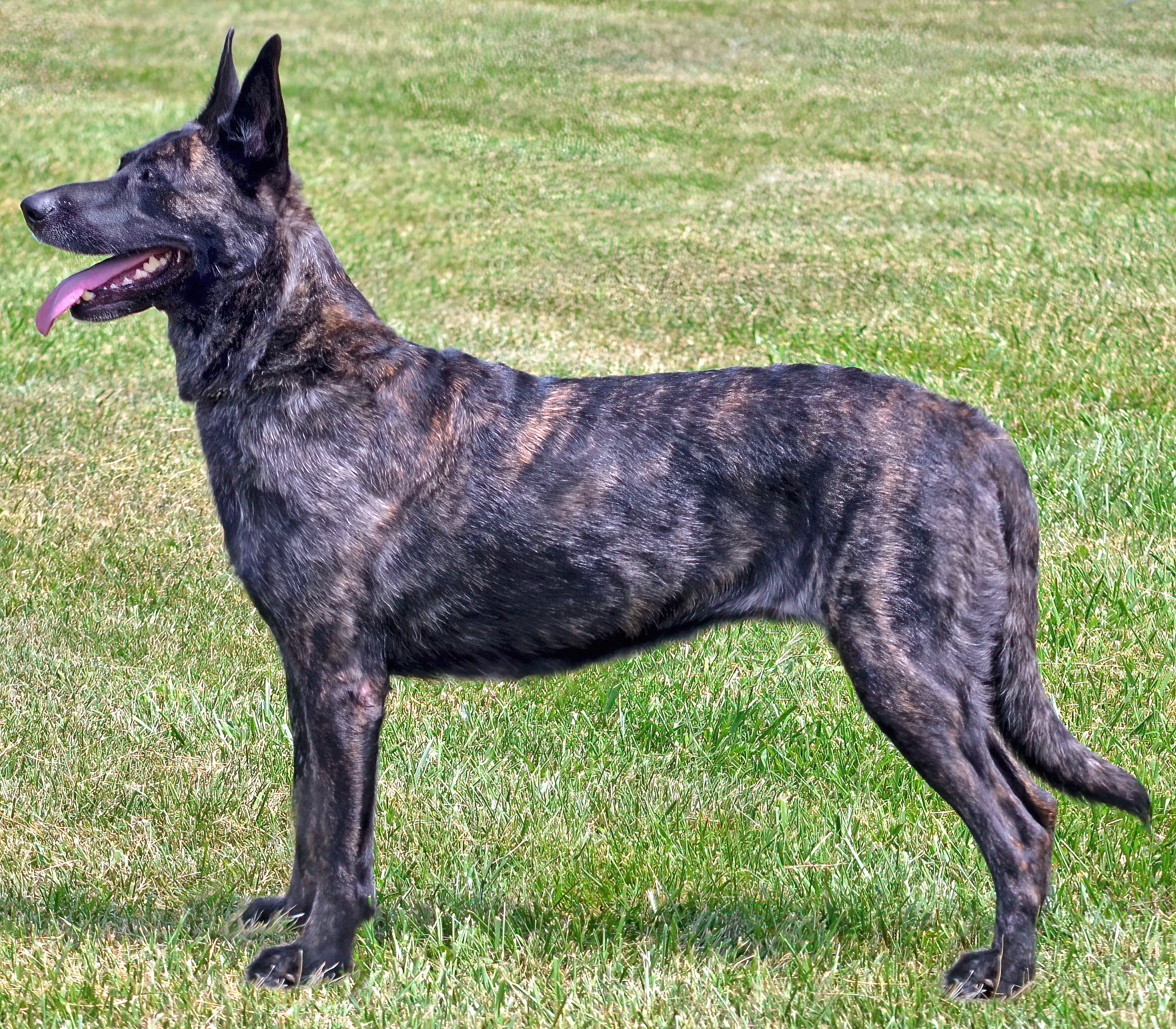
- Dutch Shepherd
- Other names: Dutch Herder; Hollandse Herdershond
- Common nicknames: Prd
- Origin: Netherlands
Traits
- Height: 22-24in
	Males	57–62 cm (22–24 in)
	Females	55–60 cm (22–24 in)
- Weight: 30–40 kg (66–88 lb)
- Coat: Both short-, long-, and rough-haired varieties
- Colour: Brindle. The basic colour is golden or silver.
Kennel club standards
- DKC: Short-haired standard
- DKC: Long-haired standard
- Fédération Cynologique Internationale: standard

The Dutch Shepherd (Dutch: Hollandse Herder) is a herding dog of Dutch origin. They were used by shepherds and farmers who needed a versatile dog that made few demands and was able to adapt to a harsh and meager existence.

== History ==
=== Origins of the Northern European Shepherds ===
The Dutch Shepherd was discovered as a naturally occurring shepherd's dog type living in the rural parts of the historic region of the Netherlands (which includes the modern-day Kingdom of the Netherlands). When the first breed standard was written in 1898, the coat could be any colour. In 1914, it was decided to allow only brindle to distinguish the breed from the then-similar German Shepherd and Belgian Shepherds.

The breeds eventually diverged into the six distinct breeds as they are known today. The Dutch Shepherd remains nearly the same dog it was more than 100 years ago. It is distinguished from the Belgian Shepherds and German Shepherd by the details specified in the breed standard, primarily of the head.

=== Function ===
Originally, the main function of the Dutch Shepherd was that of a shepherd's dog in the countryside. From early times, the Dutch had an arable culture that was maintained by flocks of sheep. The dogs had to keep the flock away from the crops, by patrolling the borders of the roads and fields. They accompanied the flocks on their way to the common meadows, markets, and ports.

At the farm, they kept the hens away from the kitchen garden, herded the cows together for milking, and pulled the milk carts. They alerted farmers when strangers entered the farmyard. Around 1900, sheep flocks had mostly disappeared in the Netherlands. The versatile skills of the Dutch Shepherds made them suitable for dog training, which was then starting to become popular. They were then trained and used as police dogs, search and tracking dogs, and guide dogs for the blind. They are still capable of herding sheep.

=== Near-extinction ===
The population of the Dutch Shepherd was greatly reduced due to modern farming techniques, nearly eliminating the need for the breed as a sheep tender. In the 1940s and 1950s, the breed was almost exterminated. The Second World War put a stop to breeding of most dog breeds in the Netherlands. Dogs died from lack of food, or were taken to Germany by the German military. Many bloodlines became extinct.

They were also used in World War II. After the war, breeding began anew and new blood was needed to diversify the gene pool. Sometimes, dogs of unknown origin were used. A Belgian Malinois was also used, but this line stopped after a few generations. In 1959, with permission from the breed club, a Belgian Laekenois was used to expand the rough-haired variety. With time, the popularity of the breed grew and expanded into other countries.

Today the Dutch Shepherd is still a rare breed. The Dutch Breed Club encourages all owners of dogs meeting the minimum conformation standards to breed them. Guidelines are laid out to increase their number and diversify the gene pool, while preserving the health of the breed.

== Description ==
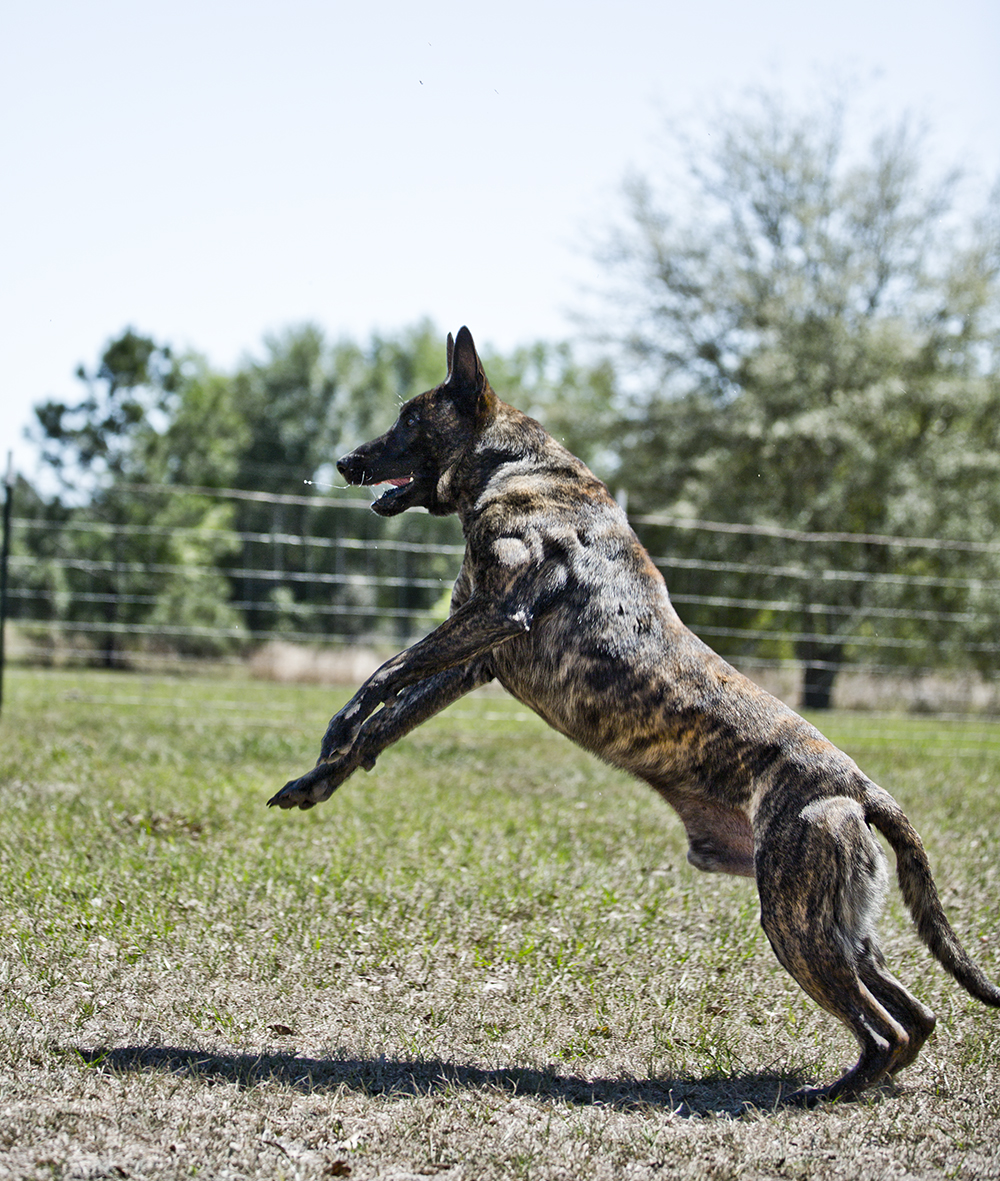
A Dutch Shepherd

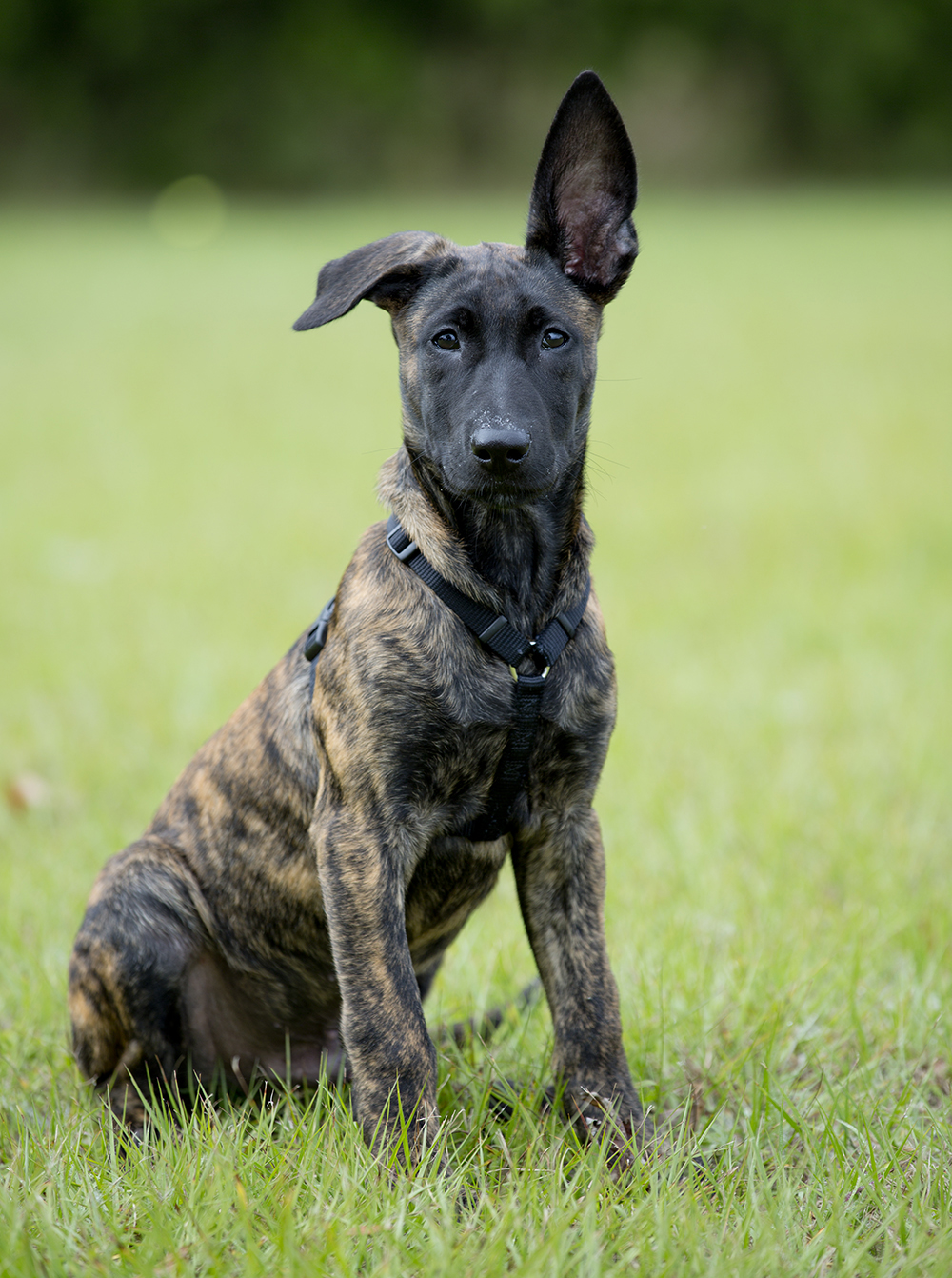
A Dutch Shepherd Puppy

=== Appearance ===
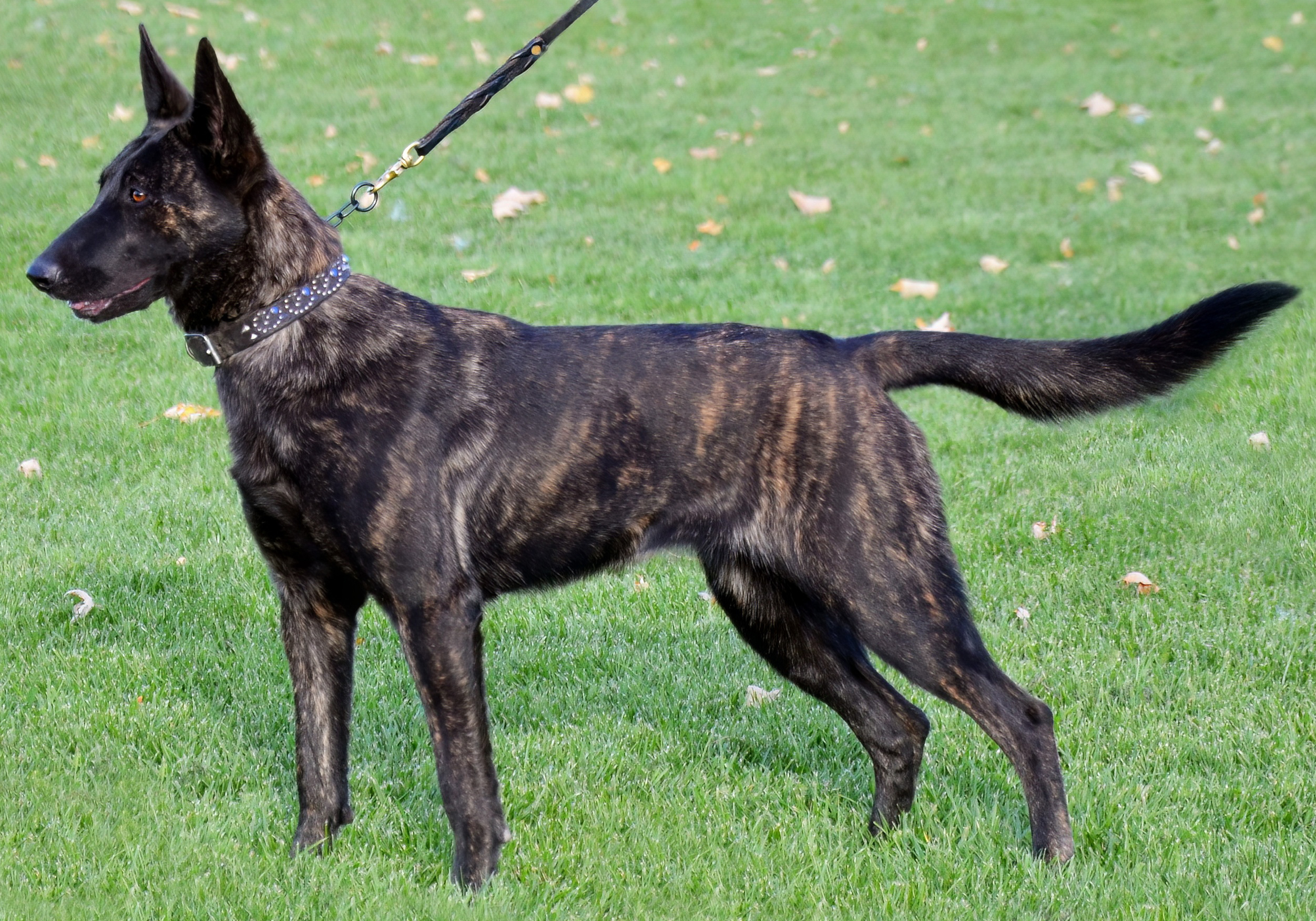
A Short-haired Dutch Shepherd

The Dutch Shepherd on average weigh between 50–70 pounds (23–32 kg) and the height varies between 55 and 63 cm (approximately 22 to 25 inches tall at the withers). Depending on the coat, the breed can be distinguished as short-haired, long-haired, or rough-haired.

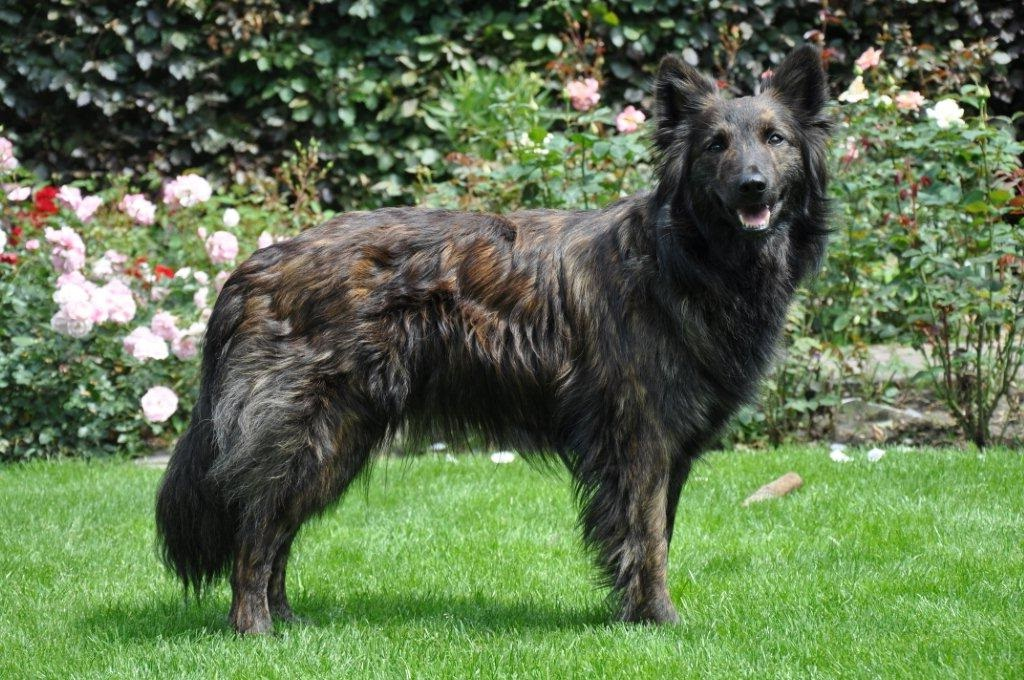
A Long-haired Dutch Shepherd

Short-haired: All over the body, quite hard, close-fitting, with woolly undercoat. Ruff, breeches and tail plume are clearly visible.

Long-haired: All over the body, long, straight, well-fitting, harsh to the touch, without curls or waves and with a woolly undercoat. Distinct ruff and breeches. Tail abundantly coated. Head, ears and feet and also the hind legs below the hocks are short and densely coated. The backsides of the forelegs show a strongly developed coat, shortening in length towards the feet, the so-called feathering. No fringes at the ears.

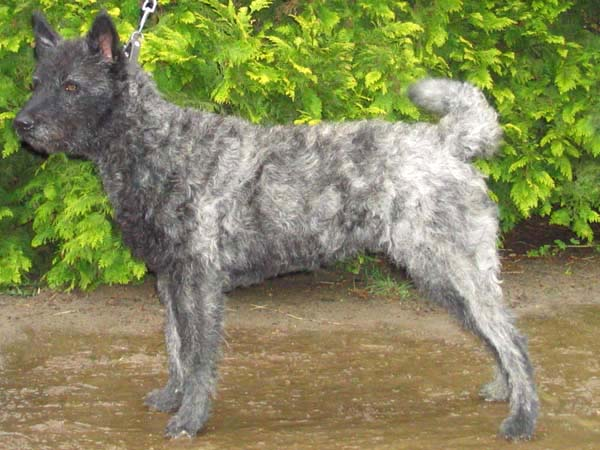
A Rough-haired Dutch Shepherd

Rough-haired: Dense, harsh tousled coat and a woolly, dense undercoat all over the body except for the head. Upper and lower lip should be well-covered with hair, the whiskers and beard, and two well-defined, coarse rough eyebrows that are distinct but not exaggerated. Furnishings are not soft. The hair on the skull and on the cheeks is less strongly developed. In profile it seems as if the head has a more square appearance. Strongly developed breeches are desirable. Tail is covered all round with hair. The brindle colour may be less pronounced because of the tousled coat.

=== Colour ===
Brindle: The basic colour is golden or silver and can vary from a near-white, light sand-colour to chestnut red. A "true silver brindle" is very rare, because having too much white is considered a fault. The brindle is clearly present all over the body, in the ruff, breeches, and tail. Too much black is undesirable. A black mask is preferable. Heavy white markings on the chest or feet are not desirable.

== Temperament ==
Dutch Shepherds are traditionally used as herding and working dogs, known for their high activity levels and independence. The breed is highly trainable and frequently utilized In obedience and working trials. Due to their working ancestry, they are characterized by a distinct herding drive and the ability to work independently on assigned tasks.

== Health ==
The Dutch Breed Club initiated a hotline in 2008 for reporting health and behavioral problems. Most genetic health problems occur at a low rate in this breed. Confirmed genetic diseases diagnosed in Dutch Shepherds include allergies (atopy), masticatory myositis, pannus, cryptorchidism and inflammatory bowel disease.

Within the rough-haired variety care should be taken to screen for goniodysplasia before breeding. This is a condition where the outflow of fluid from the eye is restricted and under certain circumstances can cause blindness. The link between genetics and goniodysplasia is uncertain. Two dogs who have a risk of goniodysplasia can still have puppies who are not at risk. The Dutch Breed Club regulations requires the testing for GD for rough-hairs.

The Orthopedic Foundation for Animals reports hip dysplasia was present in 9 percent of 705 dogs evaluated from January 1974 to March 2023. Elbow dysplasia was in 5.5 percent of 667 dogs evaluated from January 1974 to March 2023.

=== Inflammatory myopathy ===
A previously unknown inflammatory and necrotizing myopathy affecting Dutch Shepherds was genetically mapped in 2018 by the University of Minnesota Canine Genetics Laboratory who identifies this disease as IM: Inflammatory Myopathy (Myositis). The disease causes progressive, painful inflammation of skeletal muscle tissue.

The first symptoms of the disease, which usually present between three and eight months of age, include a "bunny hopping" gait and rear leg stiffness, then, it escalates to include muscle tremors, progressive weakness and severe muscle atrophy. The Dutch Shepherd Dog Club of America financed genetic research to analyze and interpret molecular information to identify this disease, which was spearheaded by Dutch Shepherd Dog Club of America veterinary counsel Karen Wroblewski DVM.

Dr. Wroblewski orchestrated a nationwide collaboration of veterinary professionals, breeders and Dutch Shepherd fanciers resulting in the description of this new condition, discovery of the causative mutated gene, definition of the mode of inheritance (autosomal recessive), and now, availability of a new DNA screening test available through University of Minnesota. The UMN College of Veterinary Medicine has updated their Canine Genetic Testing webpage to include submission forms and instructions for submitting samples for Dutch Shepherd Inflammatory Myopathy testing to identify carriers of the disease.

Both parents must be carriers to produce affected offspring, but as long as one of the two parents is IM clear, affected offspring will NOT be produced. The University of Minnesota Canine Genetics Laboratory has also coordinated with the Orthopedic Foundation for Animals to have the IM test results listed on the OFA website.

== Grooming ==
The short-haired variety needs occasional combing, with the exception during the shedding period in the spring and fall when a daily thorough brushing is needed. The long-haired variety needs to be groomed about once a week, or more frequently depending on work and environment. The rough-hair variety needs to be thoroughly brushed once a week, and twice a year the dead hair will need to be hand stripped.

== Activities ==
Dutch Shepherds are considered an active and versatile breed. They compete in dog agility, obedience, rally obedience, flyball, dock jumping, disc dog, tracking, herding, search and rescue, nosework, and weight pulling, along with protection sports such as Schutzhund, French Ring, Belgian Ring, mondioring, PSA, and others. In the Netherlands, they are still employed as herders and this instinct is still strong in the breed.

Internationally, the Dutch Shepherd is best known for use in law enforcement under the KNPV program. The Koninklijke Nederlandse Politiehond Vereniging (KNPV), or Royal Dutch Policedog Association, was founded in October 1907, as an organization to oversee and test dogs for their suitability for police work. Dutch Shepherds with KNPV titles are sought-after candidates throughout the world for police and military use, as well as sport competitors and personal-protection dogs. The KNPV began a dog registration program in 2014 for KNPV member dogs, making registration mandatory for all dogs born after 1 April 2013.

== Registry ==
=== FCI ===
The Fédération Cynologique Internationale (FCI) is an overseeing entity for many international purebred dog breed registries, including the Dutch Kennel Club (Raad van Beheer). The FCI itself is not a registry and does not issue pedigrees; instead, the FCI has 90 members and contract partners (one member per country) that each issues its own pedigrees and trains its own judges. The 'owner' countries of the breeds write the breed standards that are used as reference for judges at shows held in FCI member countries.

Some member countries have an open studbook by which dogs can be registered based on appearance, and other FCI member countries have closed studbooks. The Dutch studbooks were closed in February 1971. The goal of the FCI is, in part, 'to protect the use, the keeping, and the breeding of purebred dogs in the countries where the FCI has a member or a contract partner'. The United States is not an FCI member or contract partner.

=== The Dutch Shepherd in the United States ===
The kennel club of registry for the Dutch Shepherd in the United States is the United Kennel Club, having first published their breed standard in January 1995. Established in 1898, the United Kennel Club is the largest all-breed, performance-dog registry in the world, registering dogs from all 50 U.S. states and 25 foreign countries. More than 60% of its nearly 16,000 annually licensed events are tests of hunting ability, training, and instinct.

UKC-registered Dutch Shepherds successfully compete in conformation, obedience, agility, rally, weight pull, nosework, dock jumping, lure coursing, and previously in protection/police dog events through the now-defunct Dog Sport program. The Dutch Shepherd Dog Club of America, the UKC Provisional National Breed Club, has 2,198 permanently registered Dutch Shepherds in their archives, but indicates the number of active (under the age of 12) Dutch Shepherds totals 1,328 dogs, as of 1 June 2023.

As of 2012, the Dutch Shepherd is being recorded by the American Kennel Club in their Foundation Stock Service, accepting pedigrees from some FCI members as eligibility, but declining membership to dogs with pedigrees from certain other FCI member countries. FSS breeds are not eligible for AKC registration, but once individually registered under the FSS program, a Dutch Shepherd is able to compete in the AKC companion events of obedience, tracking, agility, and rally.

The American Kennel Club board of directors voted their approval in January 2016 of moving the Dutch Shepherd to the Miscellaneous Class, effective January 2017, and has designated the American Dutch Shepherd Association as the AKC Parent Club for the breed. In March 2024, the American Kennel Club's FSS database had 854 Dutch Shepherds recorded, with 774 of them having 3 generations listed.

== See also ==
- List of dog breeds
