= Malinois =

Malinois may refer to:

- The Malinois variety of the Belgian Shepherd
- K.V. Mechelen, a football club formerly (and nowadays informally) known by its French name of FC Malinois.
