= Sheldrick Wildlife Trust =

Kenyan wildlife conservation charity

- Founded: 1977
- Founder: Daphne Sheldrick
- Purpose: Elephant conservation
- Location: Nairobi, Kenya
- Coordinates: 1.37664°S 36.77410°E
- Origins: Sheldrick family's care for orphaned elephants
- Region served: East Africa
- Method: Work together to save elephants from being extinct
- CEO: Angela Sheldrick
- Key people: David and Daphne Sheldrick
- Website: www.sheldrickwildlifetrust.org

The Sheldrick Wildlife Trust (SWT) operates an orphaned elephant rescue and wildlife rehabilitation program in Nairobi, Kenya. It was founded in 1977 by Dame Daphne Sheldrick to honour her late husband, David. Since 2001, it has been run by their daughter, Angela.

== History ==
For over 25 years Kenya-born Daphne Sheldrick lived and worked alongside her husband, David, a naturalist and founding warden of Tsavo East National Park. Throughout this time, they raised and successfully rehabilitated many wild animal species. Daphne was the first person to have perfected the milk formula and necessary husbandry for infant milk-dependent elephants, discovering that coconut oil was the nearest substitute for the fat in elephant milk.

After David's death in 1977, Daphne and her family lived and worked in Kenya's Nairobi National Park. In 1987, the David Sheldrick Memorial Appeal, a part of the African Wildlife Project, became the David Sheldrick Wildlife Trust, an independent non-profit organisation. The organisation re-branded their name and logo on 1 February 2019, changing their name from the David Sheldrick Wildlife Trust (DSWT) to the Sheldrick Wildlife Trust in order to honour both David and Daphne.

The Sheldrick Wildlife Trust raises orphaned baby elephants and integrates them back in the wild. The trust is a leader in conservation efforts to help save the remaining African elephant populations in grave danger from the illegal ivory trade. The Sheldrick Wildlife Trust's Elephant Orphanage is located in Nairobi National Park and is open to the public for one hour every day.

== Programs and projects ==
The Sheldrick Wildlife Trust operates a digital foster program which allows individuals to support their field projects by fostering an orphaned elephant, rhino or giraffe in their care.

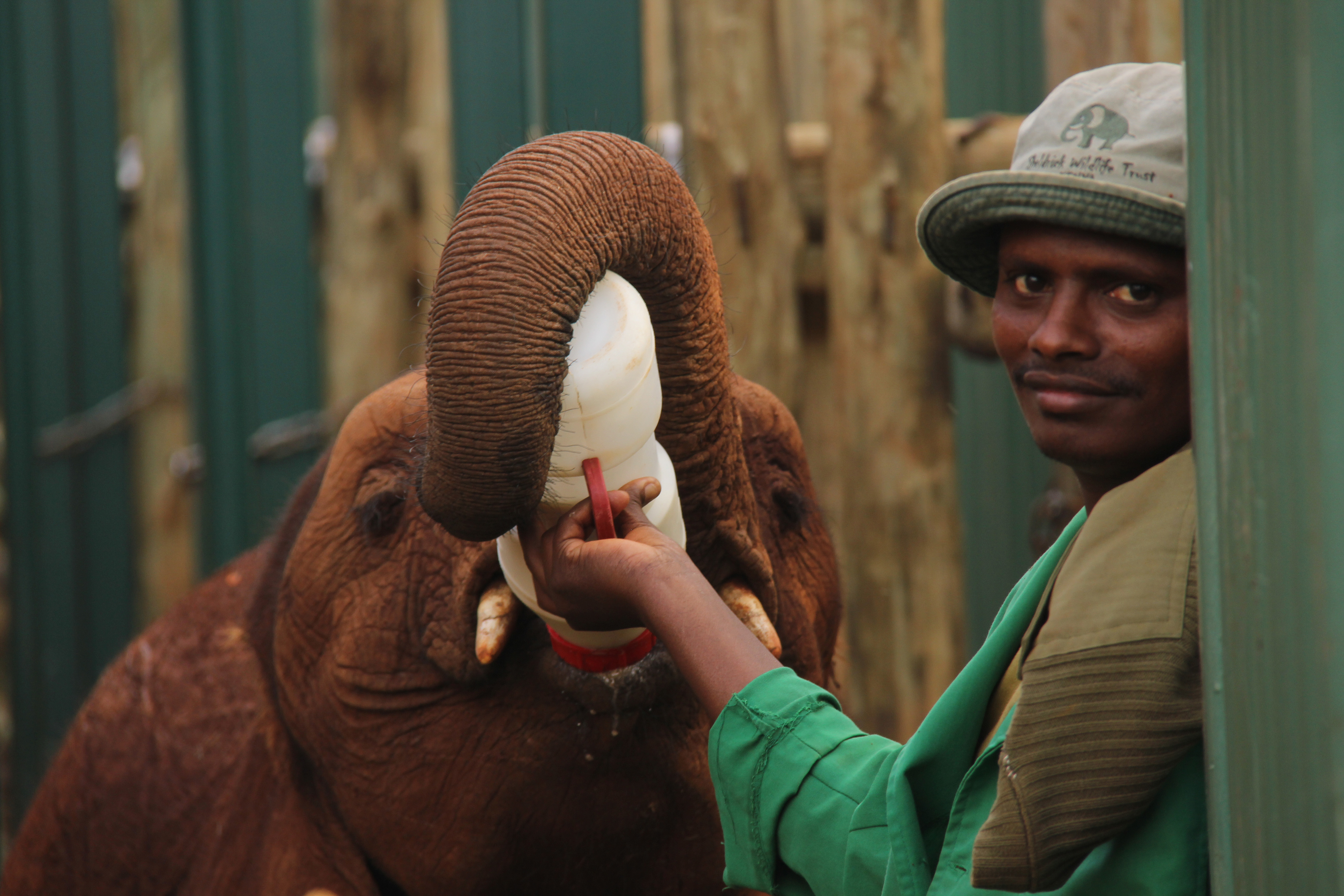
The Nairobi nursery and Ithumba unit (2013)

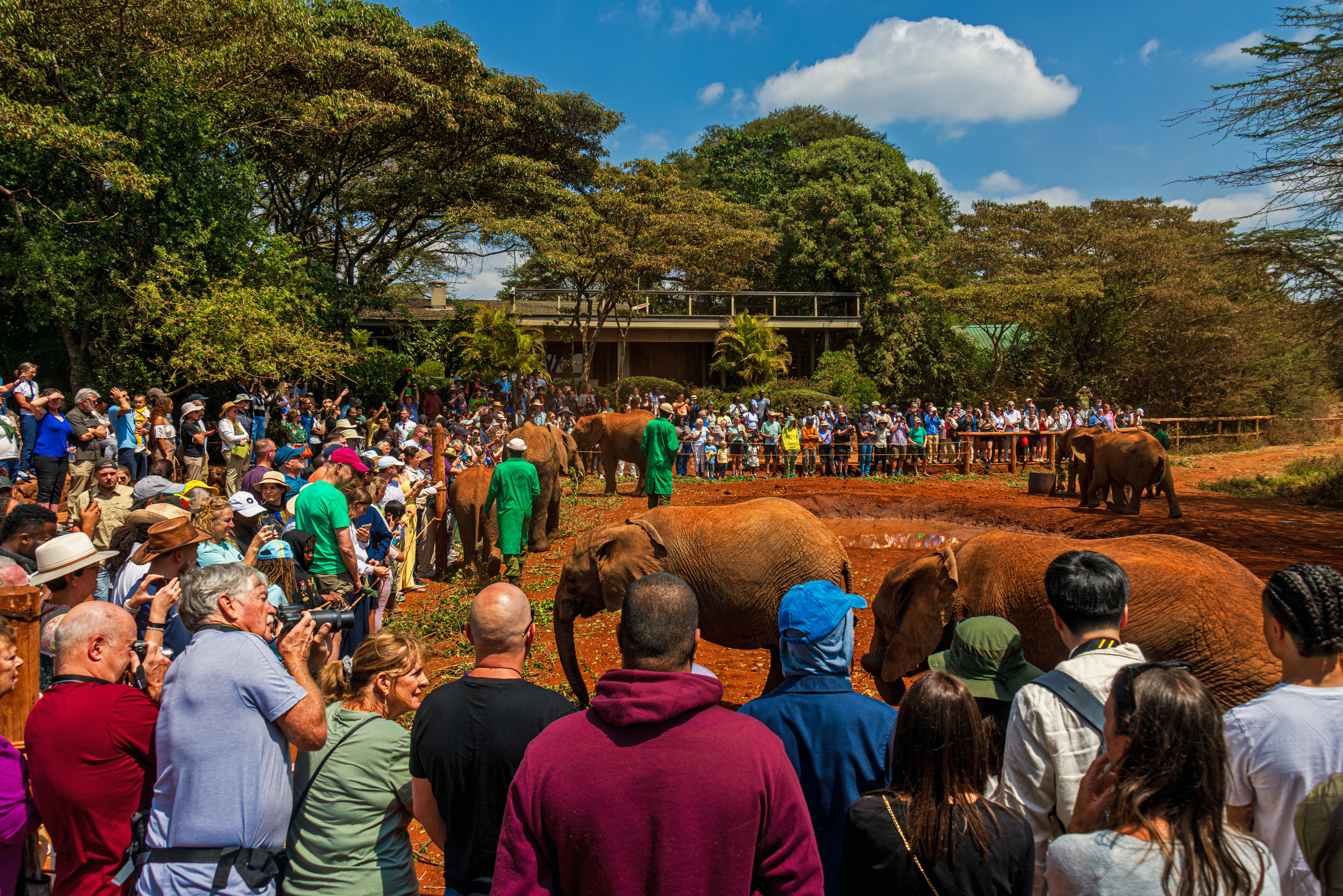
Tourists viewing the Sheldrick Trust's orphaned elephants during the one hour a day this is allowed

The Sheldrick Wildlife Trust travels throughout Kenya to rescue orphaned animals of many species including, African bush elephants, south-central black rhinoceros, giraffes, hippos and southern white rhinoceros. Many of the rescued orphans are victims of poaching and human-wildlife conflict. Following rescue, orphans are taken to the trust's nursery in Nairobi National Park for rehabilitation.

To combat ivory, bushmeat and rhino horn poaching, the Sheldrick Wildlife Trust operates anti-poaching units in partnership with the Kenya Wildlife Service (KWS).

The Sheldrick Wildlife Trust operates a specialist canine unit with three Belgian Malinois who have been trained to track and detect illegal wildlife products such as ivory, rhino horn and bush meat, as well as guns and ammunition.

Supporting the Sheldrick Wildlife Trust's ground efforts is an aerial unit, which takes part in security patrols and provides support to search and veterinary intervention for injured elephants and wildlife, as well as search-and-rescue operations for orphaned elephant calves and wildlife emergencies.

The Sheldrick Wildlife Trust operates four mobile veterinary units and a Sky Vet initiative headed by Kenya Wildlife Service Vets to alleviate the suffering of injured wild animals. The Tsavo mobile veterinary unit, based at the KWS headquarters in Voi, covers an extensive area, including the greater Tsavo Conservation Area as well as the Chyulu Hills National Park and the Shimba Hills National Reserve. The Mara mobile veterinary unit covers the Masai Mara National Reserve, the adjacent Mara Triangle, neighbouring community areas, as well as the Lake Naivasha and Nakuru areas within the Rift Valley; when needed, the unit also operates as far west as Ruma National Park and Lake Victoria. The Meru mobile veterinary unit operates out of Meru National Park and provides permanent veterinary support to the larger Meru ecosystem consisting of Meru National Park, Bisanadi National Park and Kora National Reserve, including all wildlife dispersal areas around the Eastern Conservation Area, whilst also extending its services into additional parks and reserves in the Northern Conservation Area. The Amboseli mobile veterinary unit operates out of Amboseli National Park and services the Southern Conservation Area encompassing Kajiado, Namanga, Magadi, Lake Natron as well as the Southern Tsavo West area including Lake Jipe, an ecosystem famous for large number of elephants. The Sky Vet initiative funds and coordinates the deployment of KWS vets to emergency wildlife cases throughout Kenya by air and is a vital addition to the DSWT's veterinary program. Between Sky Vets and the four units, over 1,500 wild elephants have been assisted and the lives of countless other species have been saved.

With agriculture and human settlement encroaching into wildlife habitats, disrupting migratory routes and protected boundaries, the Sheldrick Wildlife Trust has been erecting and maintaining hundreds of kilometres of fencelines to limit this growing conflict over natural resources.

With limited rainfall in the arid Tsavo Conservation Area, the Sheldrick Wildlife Trust has built fourteen boreholes and windmills to enhance the dry season productivity, as well as instigating temporary water-relief programs to relieve suffering.

In partnership with the Kenya Forest Service, the Sheldrick Wildlife Trust has embarked on conserving and sustaining the environment in the Kibwezi Forest. The forest is one of Kenya's last remaining groundwater woodlands.

The Sheldrick Wildlife Trust also operates a community outreach project, working to improve the livelihoods and educational standards of people living along the borders of Kenya's National Parks and protected areas through the introduction of community initiatives and local employment.

== See also ==
- Pinnawala Elephant Orphanage, established in 1975 by the Sri Lanka Department of Wildlife Conservation
