= Bouvier des Ardennes =

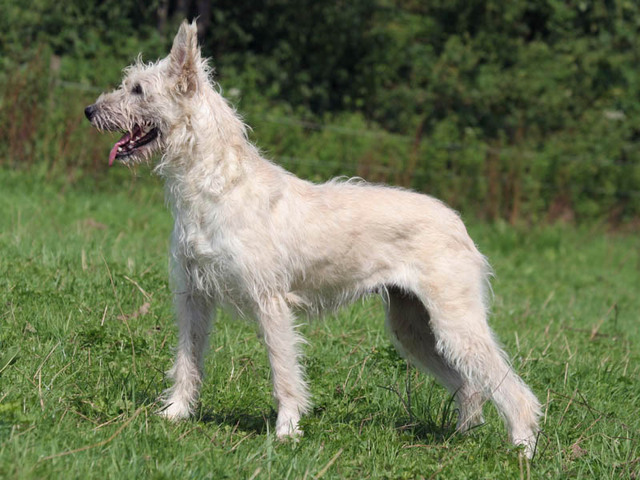
- Common nicknames: Ardennes Cattle Dog, cowdog of the Belgian Ardennes, little Bouvier
- Origin: Belgium
Traits
| Height | Males | 56–62 cm (22–24 in) |
| | Females | 52–56 cm (20–22 in) |
| Weight | Males | 28–35 kg (62–77 lb) |
| | Females | 22–28 kg (49–62 lb) |
- Coat: Rough double coat
- Colour: All colours except white
Kennel club standards
- Société Royale Saint-Hubert: standard
- Fédération Cynologique Internationale: standard

Bouvier des Ardennes is a rare dog breed from Belgium. Originating in the Ardennes region, these dogs were used as drover's dogs, especially herding and protecting cattle. The loss of farms in the area led to serious decline in the numbers of these dogs until 1985 when some breeders found a few dogs and used the original breed standard as their guide in re-introducing the dog.

== History ==
Herding dogs have been found in the Belgian Ardennes since at least the 19th century. Bred to withstand the region's harsh climate, tough work, and difficult terrain, only the hardiest and most hardworking dogs were selected for tasks like herding cows, sheep, pigs, and horses. During the World Wars, these dogs were used as poacher's dogs. By the end of the 19th century, these dogs resembled sheepdogs but were larger, stronger, and more aggressive. Belgian dog shows introduced classes for drover’s dogs to establish their specific type and a breed standard was published in 1923. Designed to be an intermediary in size, the Bouvier des Ardennes was established after 1910 by crossing Bouvier des Flandres with Belgian Malinois and perhaps the Briard. In the 20th century, the decline of farms in the Ardennes and the decrease in milking cattle herds significantly reduced the number of working dogs, including the Bouvier des Ardennes. The Bouvier des Ardennes was thought to have become extinct until a small population was discovered in 1985 and afterwards efforts were made to reestablish the breed. Due to the history of near extinction and a small population size, the breed has a high degree of inbreeding and a compromised genetic diversity.

== Appearance ==
The Bouvier des Ardennes is a robust, medium-sized dog that prioritizes function and strength over elegance. It has a short, stocky build with a heavier bone structure than its size suggests and a powerful head. They should be short, compact, and well-muscled. Its rough, wiry coat, along with its mustache and small beard, give it a formidable look. The breed is judged in its natural stance, without physical contact from the handler and the breed is not stacked in the show ring. The Bouvier De Ardennes can come in any colour except white. It is usually found in brindled or peppered variety. It has medium length, coarse, wiry hair, with a "beard" and "eyebrows". This dog can naturally have short tails or long tails, high ears, and keen eyes. The ideal height for males of 55 to 63 centimetres (22 to 25 inches), and 51 to 57 centimetres (20 to 22 inches) for females. The ideal weight is 28 to 35 kilograms (62 to 77 pounds) for males with females being 22–28 kilograms (49–62 pounds). Tails are traditionally docked, but ears are not cropped.

== See also ==
- List of dog breeds
