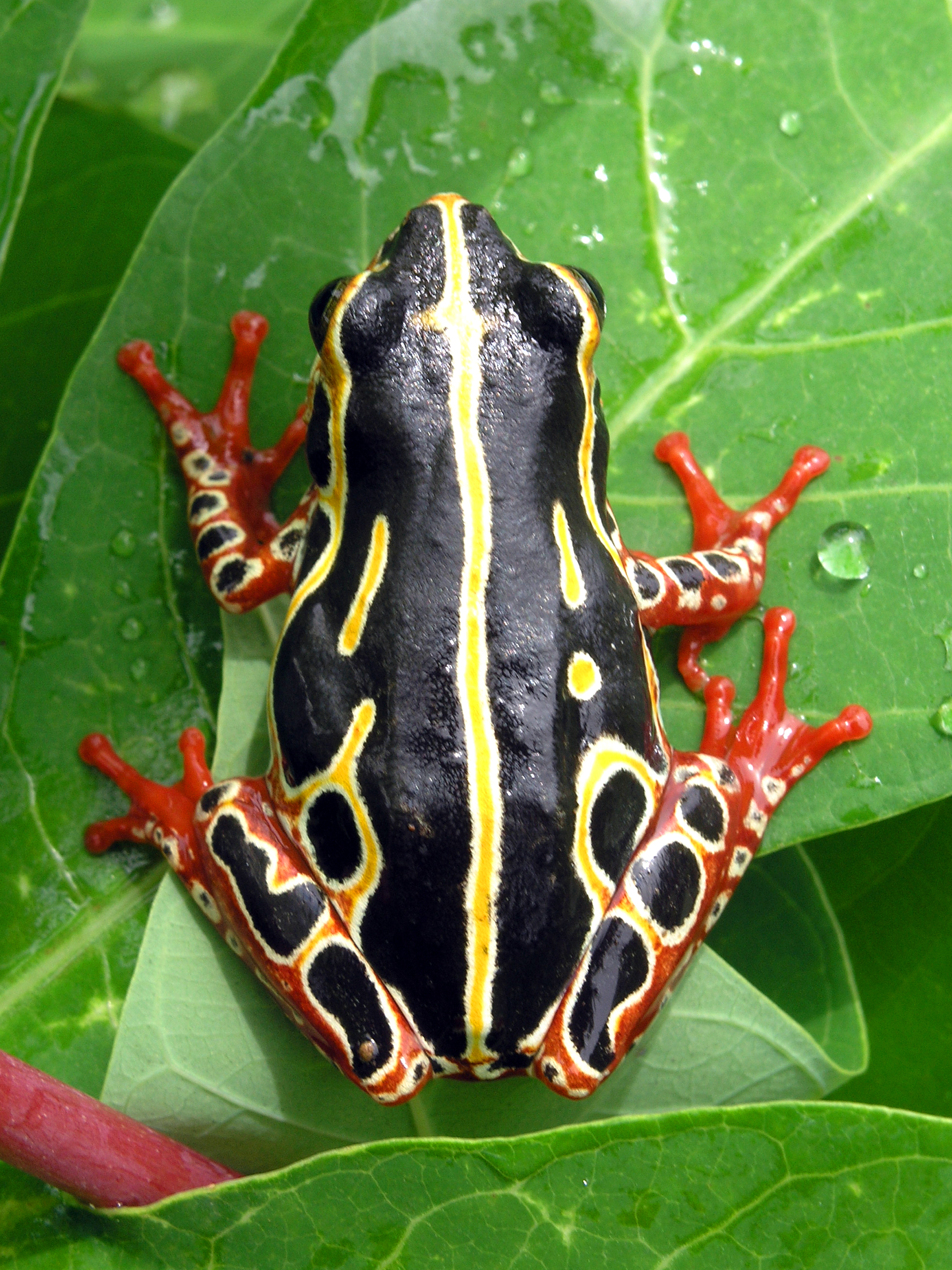

Conservation status
- Least Concern (IUCN 3.1)

Scientific classification
- Kingdom: Animalia
- Phylum: Chordata
- Class: Amphibia
- Order: Anura
- Family: Hyperoliidae
- Genus: Hyperolius
- Species: H. viridiflavus

Binomial name
- Hyperolius viridiflavus Dumeril & Bibron, 1841

= Common reed frog =

Species of amphibian

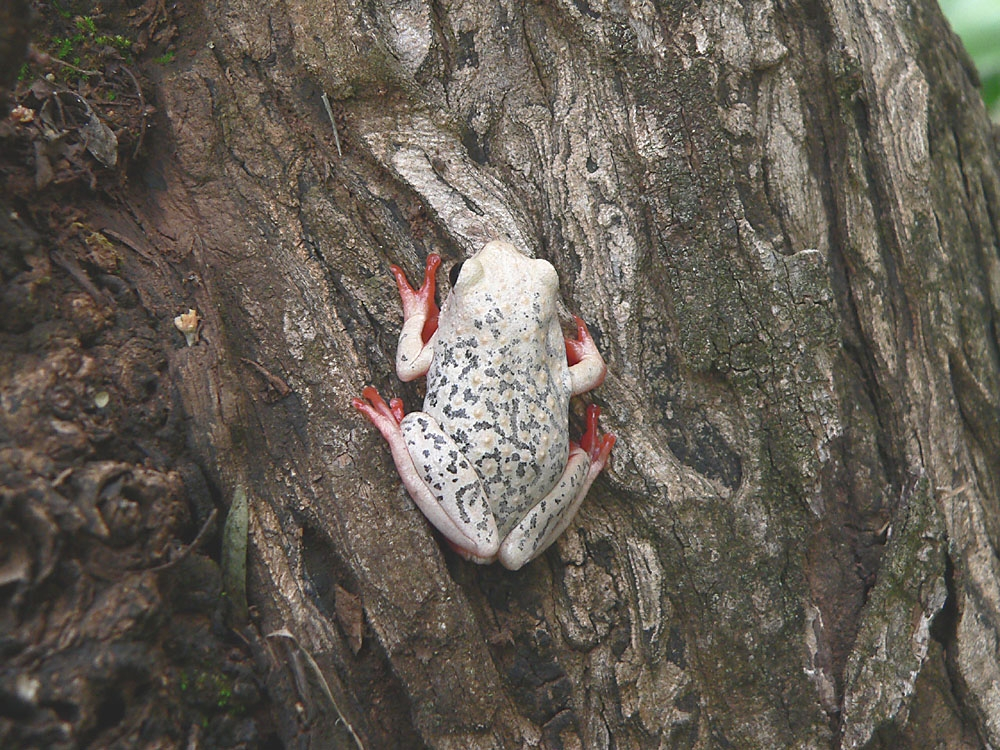

The common reed frog (Hyperolius viridiflavus) is a species of tree frogs in the family Hyperoliidae found in Burundi, the Democratic Republic of the Congo, Ethiopia, Kenya, Rwanda, Sudan, Tanzania, and Uganda, and possibly the Central African Republic, Chad, and Eritrea. Its natural habitats are subtropical or tropical dry forest, subtropical or tropical moist lowland forest, subtropical or tropical moist montane forest, dry savanna, moist savanna, subtropical or tropical dry shrubland, subtropical or tropical moist shrubland, subtropical or tropical seasonally wet or flooded lowland grassland, subtropical or tropical high-altitude grassland, rivers, swamps, freshwater lakes, intermittent freshwater lakes, freshwater marshes, intermittent freshwater marshes, freshwater springs, arable land, pastureland, rural gardens, urban areas, heavily degraded former forests, water storage areas, ponds, irrigated land, seasonally flooded agricultural land, and canals and ditches.

The common reed frog is particularly thrifty at rationing out its moisture to maintain long, dry periods during the extended dry seasons in West Africa. It does so by a combination of anuria and increasing its ability to intake water. Fluids contained in its bladder can be used when water becomes unavailable, and the increase in uptake allows it to replenish its stores quickly when the weather allows.

Some evidence suggests that west African frogs may change sex from female to male after having successfully bred. Animals that switch sex as adults are known as sequential hermaphrodites because they have the gonads of either sex but at different periods of their lives. This contrasts with animals which are "simultaneous hermaphrodites" which have both gonads at the same point. However, this sequential hermaphroditism in reed frogs has only been noted once and in a captive colony.
