= Daphne Sheldrick =

Kenya-based British author, conservationist and expert in animal husbandry (1934–2018)

Daphne Marjorie Sheldrick
- Born: Daphne Jenkins; 4 June 1934; Kenya
- Died: 12 April 2018 (aged 83); Nairobi, Kenya
- Known for: Sheldrick Wildlife Trust
- Spouse: David Sheldrick
- Children: Gillian Woodley (daughter); Angela Sheldrick (daughter)
- Scientific career
- Fields: Conservation

Dame Daphne Marjorie Sheldrick, DBE (née Jenkins; 4 June 1934 – 12 April 2018) was a Kenyan author, conservationist and expert in animal husbandry, particularly the raising and reintegrating of orphaned elephants into the wild for over 30 years. She was the founder of the Sheldrick Wildlife Trust.

== Biography ==
=== Early life ===
Daphne Jenkins was born in Kenya in 1934 to British parents, at a time when Kenya was still a British colony. Her parents, Bryan Jenkins and Marjorie Webb Jenkins, operated a large farm and timber operation in Gilgil. At the outbreak of World War II, her father, a naturalist, was sent to a game reserve where he was ordered to kill zebra and wildebeest to feed British and Kenyan troops. In 1940, at age 6, she went to visit her father's camp and later remember thinking, "This is how I would like to live, out here among the animals under the sky."

She was educated at Nakuru Primary School and The Kenya High School where she matriculated in 1950 with honors and the possibility of a bursary to attend university; however, she opted for marriage.

=== Adult years ===
In 1953, she married Bill Woodley, who battled wildlife poaching in Kenya's game reserves. They ultimately divorced, and on 20 October 1960 she married Woodley's boss, David Sheldrick. From 1955-76, she was co-warden of Tsavo National Park with her husband. The couple began caring for all different kinds of orphaned animals, always with a point of reintegrating them into the wild. Many of these young animals were elephants, and Sheldrick began hand-feeding them a milk formula she developed herself.

Des and Jen Bartlett filmed the orphan elephant, Samson, during and after its capture. It was said that this inspired the creation of the Sheldrick's animal orphanage.

During this time, Sheldrick raised and rehabilitated back into the wild many different species, including elephants, black rhinos, buffalo, zebras, elands, kudus, impalas, duikers, reedbuck, dikdiks, warthogs, civets, mongooses and birds. Sheldrick was a recognised authority on the rearing of wild creatures and was the first person to perfect the milk formula and necessary husbandry for both infant milk-dependent elephants and rhinos. When she first made attempts to keep the orphaned baby elephants alive with traditional milk sources, they remained malnourished. It was only after trying every combination she could find that she hit on one milk formula from Europe containing coconut oil that was found to be the nearest substitute for the fat in elephant milk.

Sheldrick died on 12 April 2018 at the age of 83 of breast cancer.

== Sheldrick Wildlife Trust ==
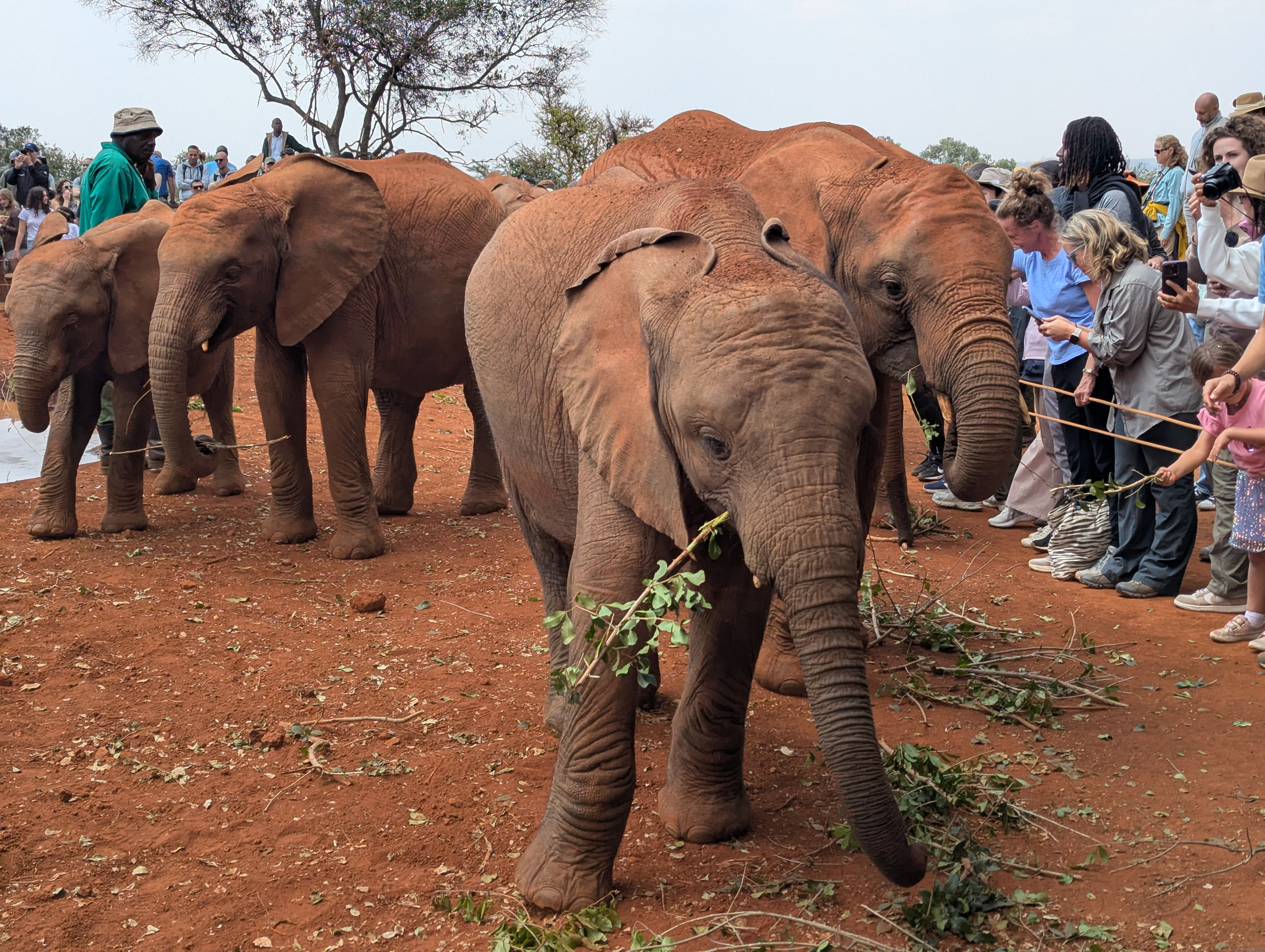
The Shedrick Wildlife Trust in 2025

After 17 years of marriage, David Sheldrick died on 13 June 1977 at the age of 57. Following her husband's death, Daphne Sheldrick continued her conservation efforts. Sheldrick and her daughter, Jill, cared for a succession of orphaned elephants and rhinos. As a result, the David Sheldrick Memorial Appeal, a project of the African Wildlife Project, metamorphosed into the David Sheldrick Wildlife Trust in 1987; becoming an independent non-profit organisation. Embracing the conservation, preservation, and protection of wildlife in Kenya, the Sheldrick Wildlife Trust—renamed in February 2019 to honor Daphne and the whole Sheldrick family—today operates the most successful orphan-elephant rescue and rehabilitation program in the world. It works alongside Anti-Poaching Teams, Mobile Veterinary Units, Aerial Surveillance, and a Sky Vet initiative in partnership with the Kenya Wildlife Service. Other projects which aim to safeguard the natural environment and enhance community awareness include Saving Habitats and Community Outreach projects.

Known for its pioneering Orphans' Project, the Sheldrick Wildlife Trust rescued over 262 orphaned elephants and reintegrated over 160 back into the wild.

== Honours ==
For her work as a conservationist, Sheldrick was awarded an MBE by Queen Elizabeth II in the 1989 Birthday Honours, and separately elevated to UNEP's Global 500 Roll of Honour in 1992, where she was among the first 500 people worldwide to have been accorded this particular honour. Sheldrick was also awarded an Honorary Doctorate in Veterinary Medicine and Surgery by Glasgow University in June 2000. In December 2001 her work was honoured by the Kenyan Government with the Moran of the Order of the Burning Spear (MBS) decoration. In 2002, the BBC recognised Sheldrick with their Lifetime Achievement Award. In the November 2005 issue of the Smithsonian magazine, Daphne Sheldrick was named as one of 35 people worldwide who have made a difference in terms of animal husbandry and wildlife conservation. Queen Elizabeth II promoted Daphne Sheldrick a Dame Commander of the Order of the British Empire in the 2006 New Year's Honours List, "[f]or services to the conservation of wildlife, especially elephants, and to the local community in Kenya.". This was the first damehood to be awarded in Kenya since the country received Independence in 1963.

== Film and television ==
Sheldrick appeared in the 2011 documentary Born to Be Wild.

She also appeared on the PBS show My Wild Affair discussing orphaned elephants.

== Books ==
- Sheldrick, Daphne (2012). An African Love Story: Love, Life, and Elephants. London: Viking. ISBN 9780670919727. OCLC 812686419.
  - Sheldrick, Daphne (2012). Love, Life, and Elephants: An African Love Story (First American ed.). New York: Farrar, Straus and Giroux. ISBN 9780374104573. OCLC 759175043.
