= Sheldrick Forest Preserve =

Forest in New Hampshire, United States

Coordinates: 42°49′31″N 71°47′45″W

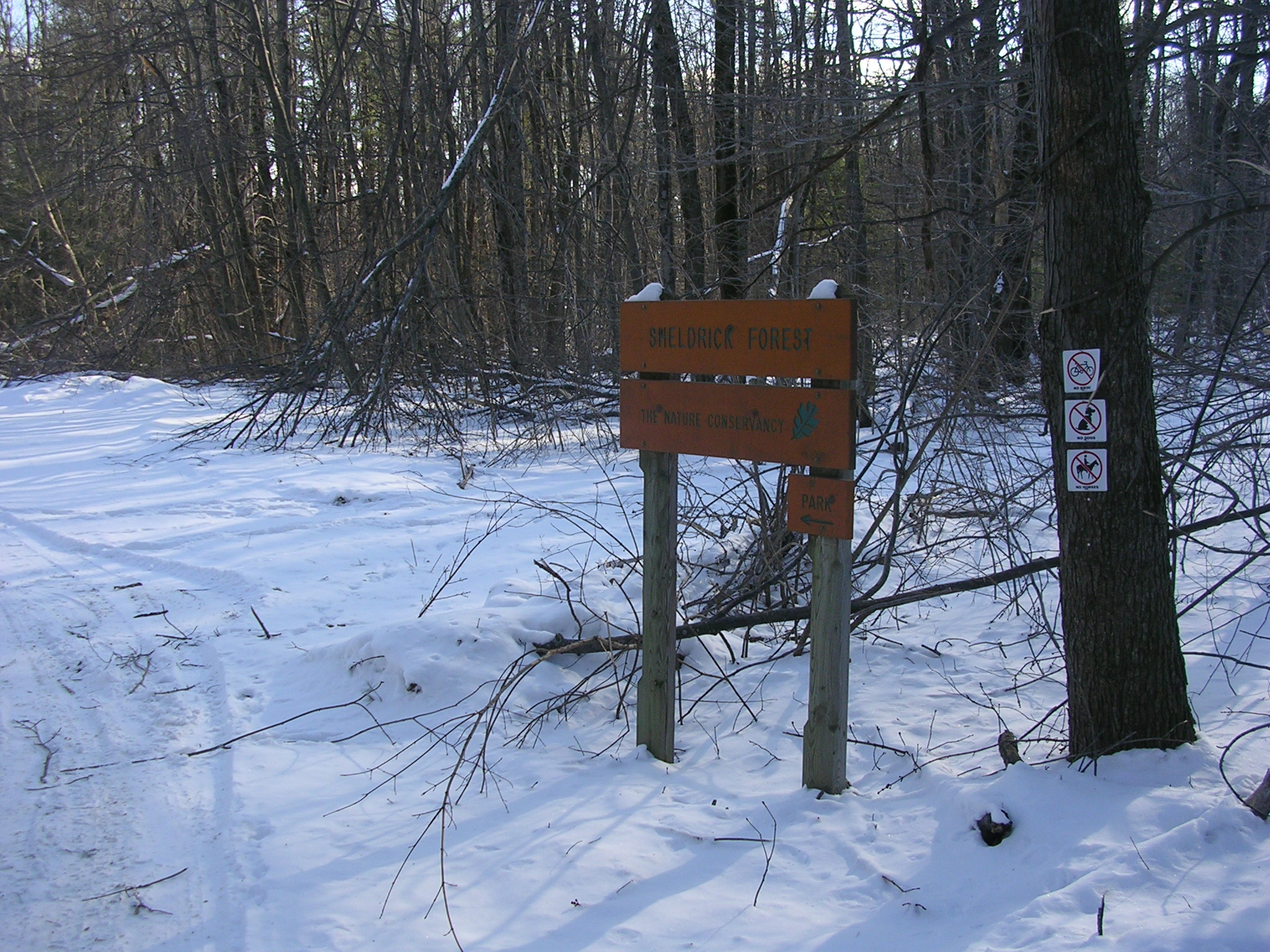
The entrance sign to the Sheldrick Forest Preserve.

The Sheldrick Forest Preserve is a forest located in West Wilton, New Hampshire and owned by The Nature Conservancy. The 227-acre (0.92 km^{2}) property is host to a large diversity of old growth trees and a number of plants. The preserve's three miles of trails are available to the public.

== History ==
The Sheldrick forest was owned by the Sheldrick family since 1897. For more than 150 years, the forest was kept largely undisturbed by logging or agriculture. However, in December 1994, the property was sold to a developer who sought to exploit the land for both timber and gravel deposits.

The forester hired to evaluate the land's economic worth, Swift Corwin, recognized the value of the land and contacted The Nature Conservancy in 1995. The original owner agreed to sell the property for several hundred thousand dollars, which was paid in April 1996 through several donations and fundraising events.

=== Natural history ===
The Sheldrick Forest Preserve was affected heavily by glacial drift activity approximately 18,000 years ago. Signs of the glacial activity are still visible today. The stone walls and stone bridges in some areas of the forest are indicators of more recent activity, likely being built in the early 19th century.

The land has a diverse selection of tree species, and contains more than six natural communities, including the rich mesic forest, hemlock-pine ravine forest, black beech forest, red birch forest, oak forest, and a stand of butternut trees. In addition to the trees, there is an abundance of mountain laurel, several streams, and interior forest breeding birds.

== Gallery ==
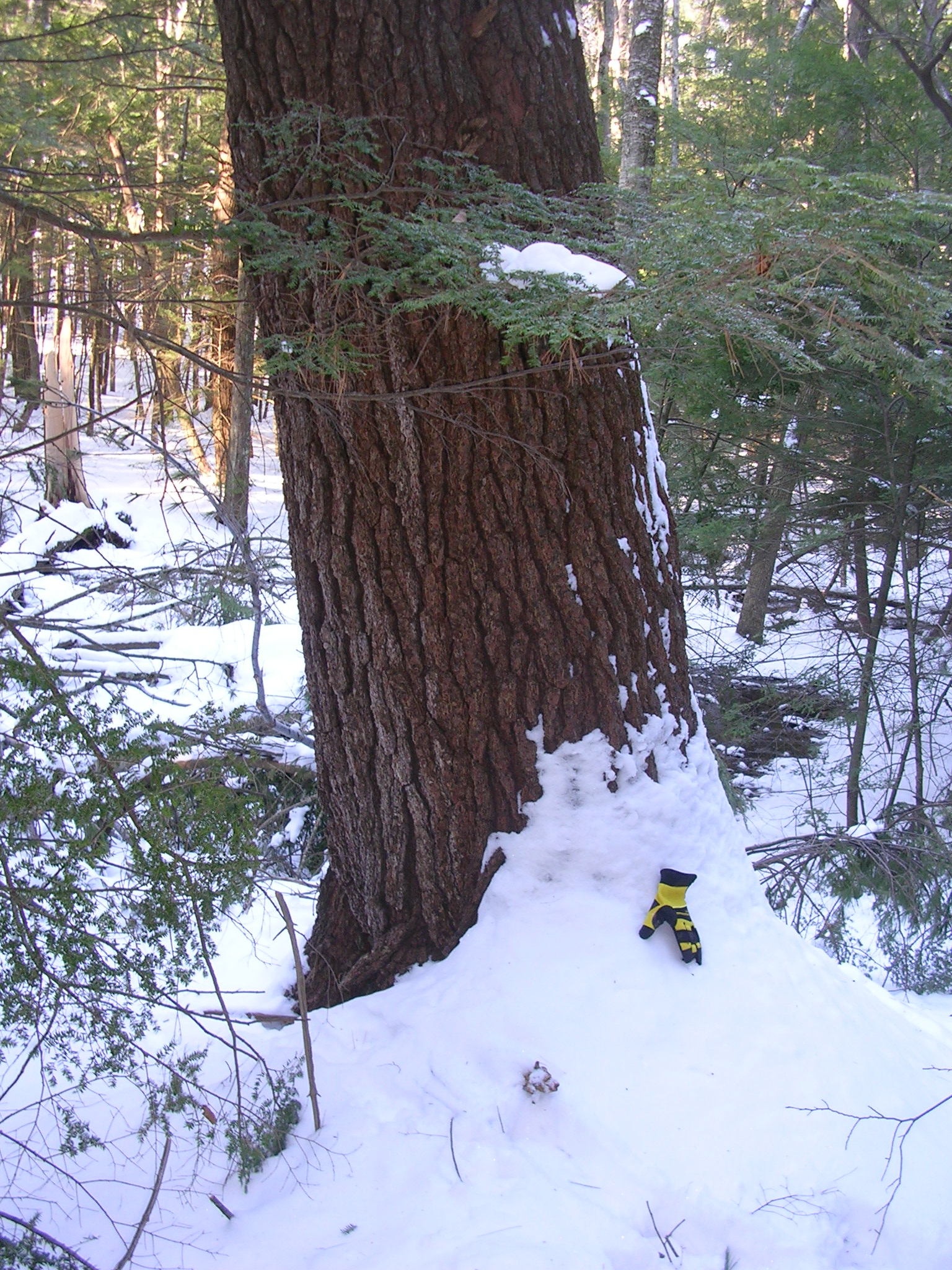
A glove is shown at the base of an old Eastern White Pine for size comparison.

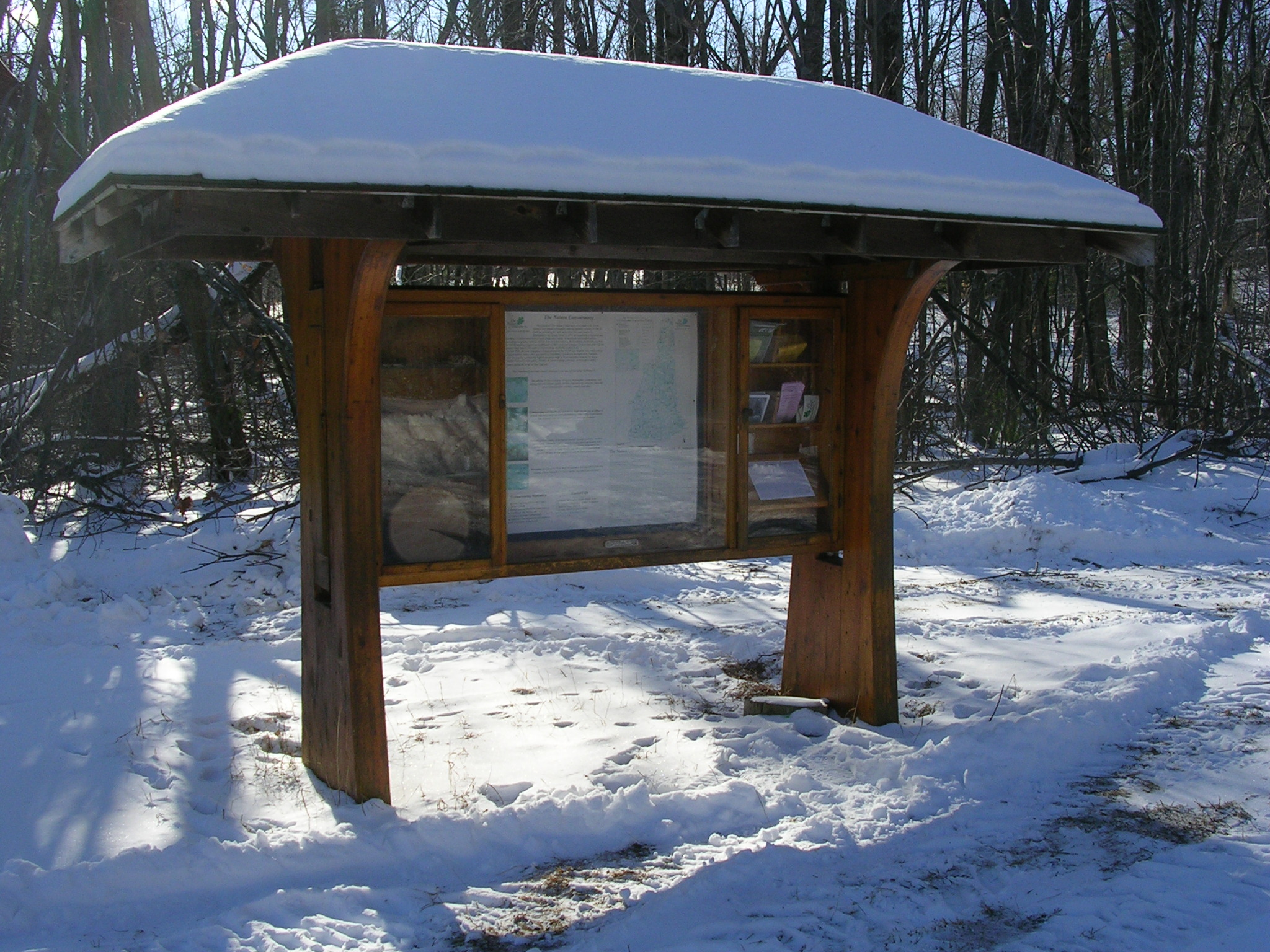
Sheldrick Forest Preserve kiosk.

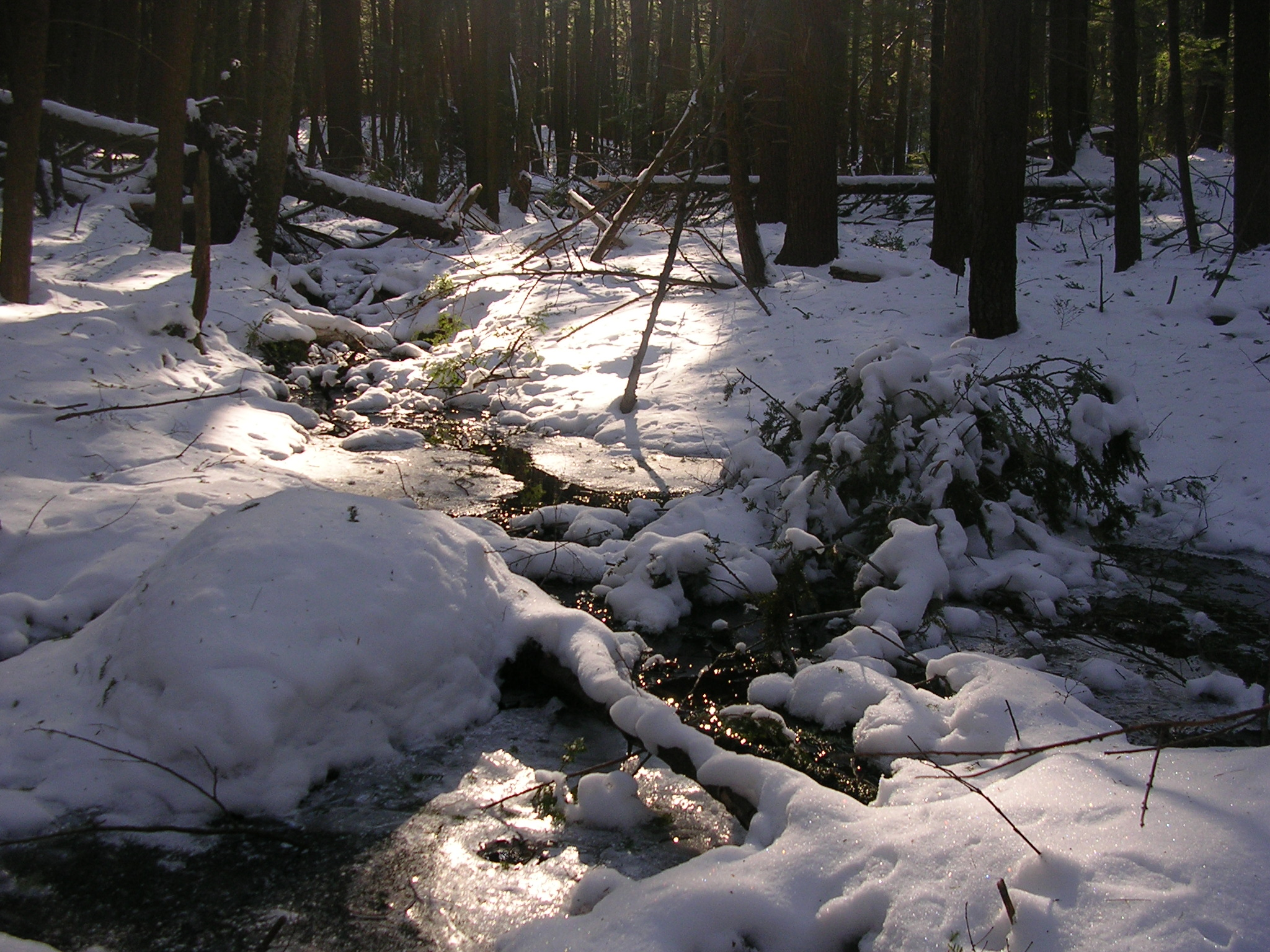
A stream in the Sheldrick Forest Preserve.

== See also ==
- List of old growth forests
