= Schutzhund =

Protection dog sport which includes tracking and obedience

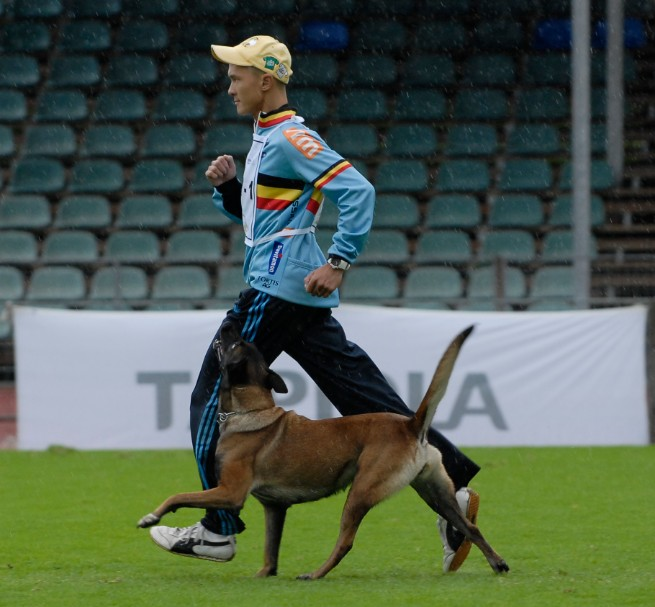
- The Obedience Phase in Schutzhund at 2010 FCI World Championship Finland
- Sport: Dog sports
- Competition: Trials
- Discipline: Protection dog sports
- Nickname: IPO, (Note: IPO — Internationale Prüfungs-Ordnung (translation from German: International Examination Regulations)) IGP (Note: IGP — Internationale Gebrauchshunde Prüfungsordnung (translation from German: International Utility Dog trial regulations))

Schutzhund (/'ʃʊtshʊnt/, German for "protection dog" (Note: SchH — Schutzhund (translation from German: Protection Dog))), currently known competitively as IGP and previously as IPO, is a dog sport that tests a dog's tracking, obedience, and protection skills, and evaluates if a dog has the appropriate traits and characteristics of a good working dog.

It was developed in Germany in the early 1900s as a suitability test for German Shepherds, but soon became the model for training and evaluating all five of the German protection breeds, which included Boxer, Dobermann, Giant Schnauzer, and Rottweiler. Though any breed of dog can participate, today the sport is dominated by German Shepherds and the Belgian Shepherd breed.

In 2025 Schutzhund and other working dog activities were awarded UNESCO Intangible Cultural Heritage status.

Dog owners and handlers participate in Schutzhund clubs as a group activity for training the dogs, and clubs sponsor trials to test the dogs and award titles. The best dogs can qualify to participate in national and international level championships.

== Traits of Schutzhund dogs ==
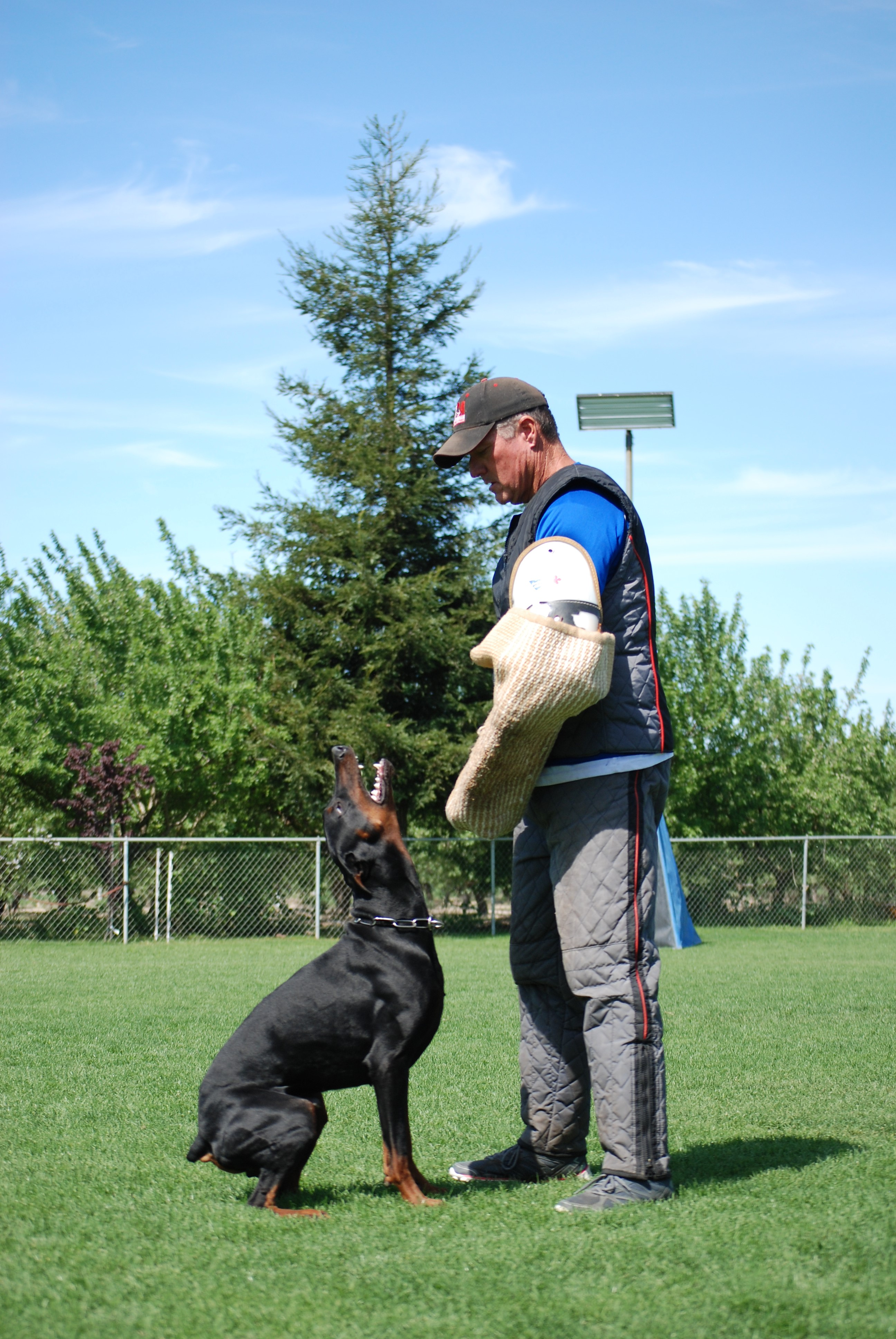
Guarding the decoy (man). A schutzhund dog must have confidence and self-control.

Schutzhund tests dogs for the traits necessary for police-type work. Dogs trained in Schutzhund are suitable for a wide variety of working tasks: police work, specific odor detection, search and rescue, and many others. The purpose of Schutzhund is to identify dogs that have, or do not have, the character traits required for these demanding jobs such as a strong desire to work, courage, intelligence, trainability, strong bond to the handler, perseverance, protective instinct, and a good sense of smell. Schutzhund also tests for physical traits such as strength, endurance, agility, and scenting ability. The goal of Schutzhund is to illuminate the character and ability of a dog through training. Breeders can use this insight to determine how and whether to use the dog in producing the next generation of working dogs.

The German Shepherd was developed from working herding dogs around 1900 as an all-around working dog. Within a few years it was clear that the dogs were losing their working ability. Schutzhund was developed at this time as a test of working ability for German Shepherds. Only German Shepherds that had passed a Schutzhund test or a herding test were allowed to breed and thus have their progeny registered as German Shepherd Dogs (GSD). This is true in Germany to this day. It is only by testing the working ability of every generation that the strong working characteristics of the GSD have been maintained.

Today, any breed can participate in the sport, though some breed clubs run trials for just their single-breed members. The intermediate and advanced levels of the sport and the top titles are dominated by German Shepherds and Belgian Malinois, with Dobermans, Rottweilers, and Bouvier des Flandres also quite successful. At the beginning levels such as BH level (Companion Dog test) and OB (Obedience), a wide variety of breeds and sizes participate.

== Trials and titles ==
Trials are events—competitive examinations of a dog—at which titles are awarded to dogs that pass standards. In Germany, German Shepherd Dogs are not permitted to be bred unless they have passed at least the level one trials and obtained a title.

There are three levels of titles, numbered 1 through 3, with level 1 being the first and level 3 being the most advanced. Previously they were called Schutzhund 1 through Schutzhund 3 (abbreviated SchH1–SchH3), in 2012 they became IPO1–IPO3, and in 2019 they became IGP1–IGP3.

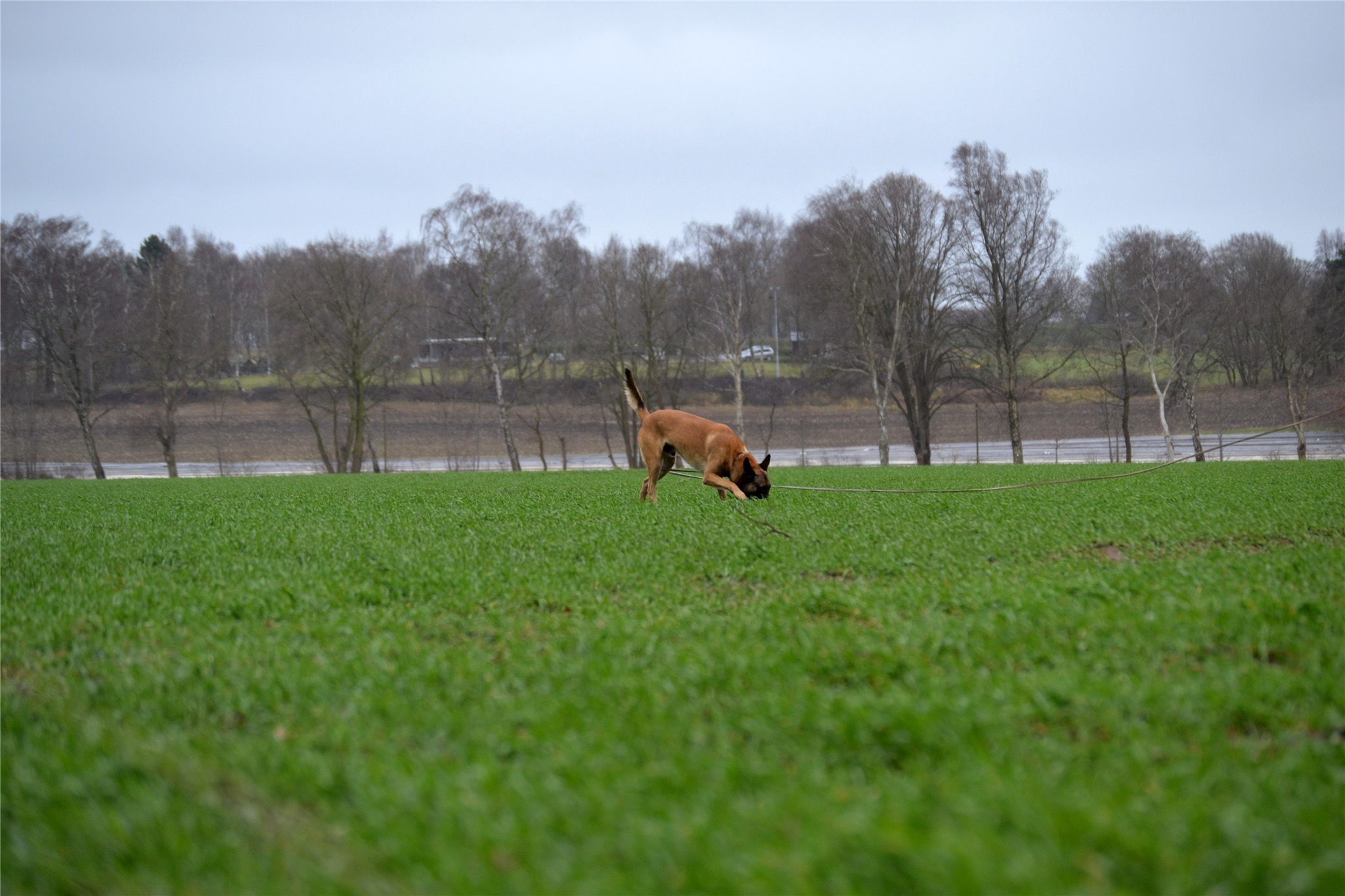
Tracking phase

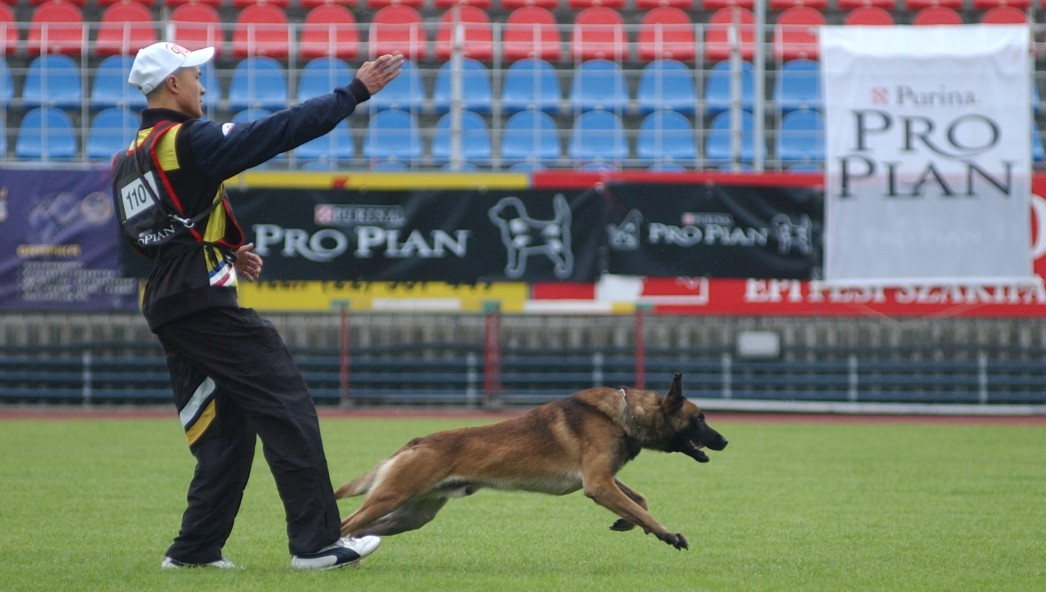
Obedience phase: the "send out"

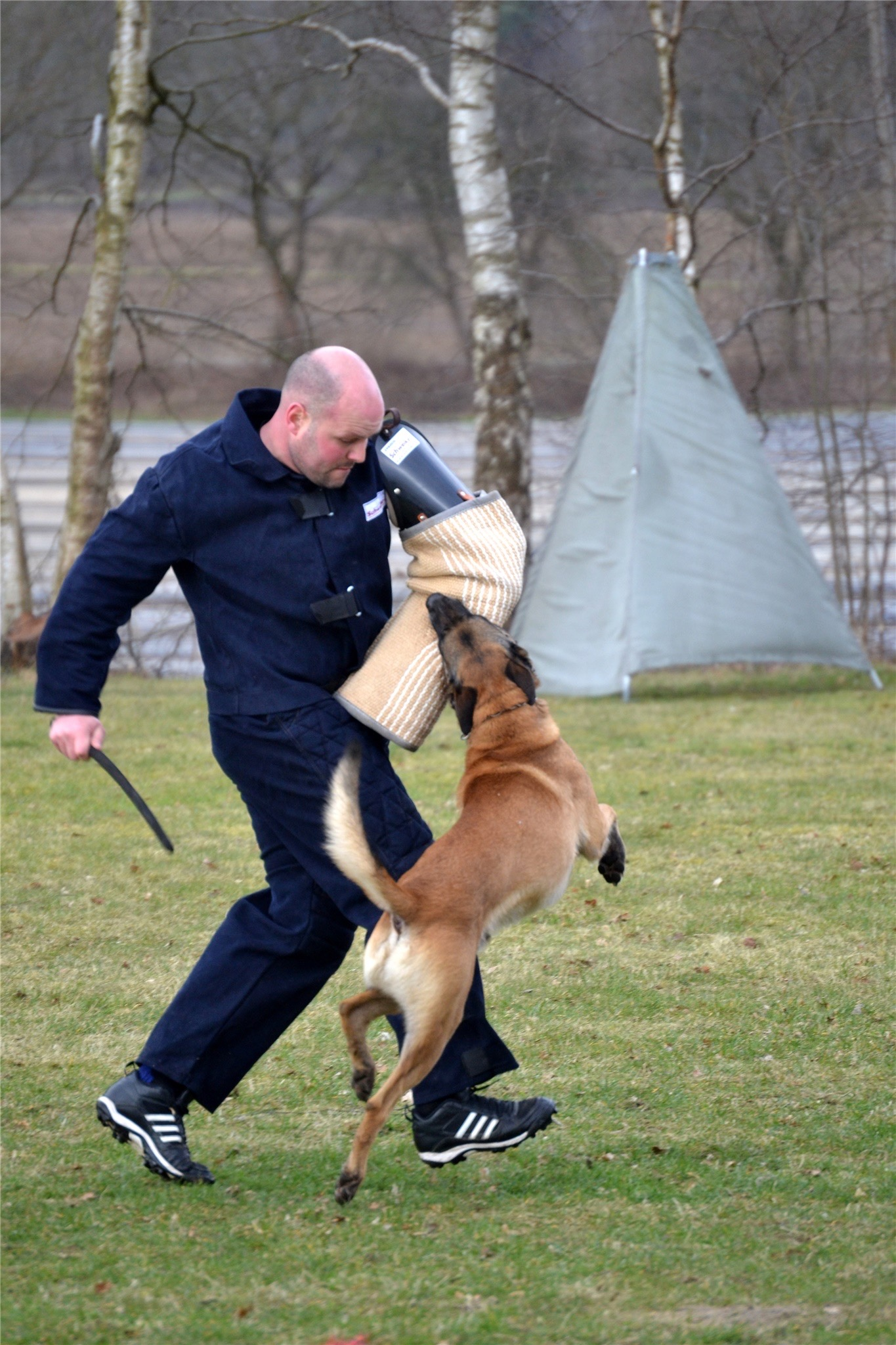
Protection phase

Trials have changed over the years. Modern trials consist of three phases: tracking, obedience, and protection. A dog must pass all three phases in one trial to be awarded a title, must have passed the prior level before allowed to compete, and may only acquire one title within an event. Each phase is judged on a point scale with a minimum score required to obtain a title. At any time the judge may dismiss a dog for showing poor temperament, fear or aggression, or failing one of several tests within each phase.

As a prerequisite, before a dog can compete for IGP1, it must pass a temperament test called a BH-VT (Note: BH-VT—Begleithundeprüfung mit Verkehrssicherheitsteil (translation from German: Utility dog examination with traffic safety part)) (usually called just "BH"). The BH-VT tests basic obedience and confidence around strange people, strange dogs, traffic, bicyclists, joggers, loud noises, and briefly tethered alone (such as tethering the dog to a post while its owner goes out of sight into a shop). A dog that exhibits excessive fear, distracted behaviors, or aggression will not pass the BH-VT and so cannot go on to IGP level 1. BH-VT is the exception to the rule of earning only one title at an event; a dog may be awarded a BH-VT along with one other level 1 title.

- Tracking phase: This tests not only the dog's scenting ability, but its mental soundness, and physical endurance. A "track layer" walks across a field dropping several small articles along the way. After a period of time, the dog is directed to follow the track while being followed by its handler on a 10 metres (33 ft) leash. When the dog finds each article, he indicates it, usually by lying down with the article between his front paws. The dog is scored on how intently and carefully it follows the track and indicates the articles. The length, complexity, number of articles, and age of the track varies for each title.
- Obedience phase: This takes place in a large field, with two dogs on the field at a time. One dog is placed in a down position on the side of the field and its handler leaves it while the other dog works in the field. Then the dogs switch places. In the field, there are several heeling exercises, including heeling through a group of people. There are two or three gunshots during the heeling to test the dog's reaction to loud noises. There are one or two recalls, three retrieves (flat, jump and A-frame), and a "send out", in which the dog is directed to run away from the handler straight and fast and then lie down on command during its run. Obedience is judged on the dog's accuracy and attitude. The dog must show enthusiasm. A dog that is uninterested or cowering scores poorly.
- Protection phase: The judge has an assistant, called the "helper", who helps test the dog's courage to protect itself and its handler, and its ability to be controlled while doing so. The helper wears a heavily padded sleeve on one arm. There are several "blinds" on the field, and the helper hides in a random blind. The dog is directed to search all the blinds for the helper. When it finds the helper, it indicates by barking. The dog must guard the helper to prevent them from moving until recalled by the handler. There follows a series of exercises similar to police work where the handler searches the helper and transports them to the judge. At specified points, the helper either attacks the dog or the handler, or attempts to escape. The dog must stop the attack or the escape by biting the padded sleeve. When the attack or escape stops, the dog is commanded to "out", or release the sleeve. The dog must out or it is dismissed. At all times the dog must show courage to engage the helper and the temperament to obey the handler while in this high state of emotional arousal. The dog must show enthusiasm. A dog that shows fear, lack of control, or inappropriate aggression is dismissed.

== Training ==
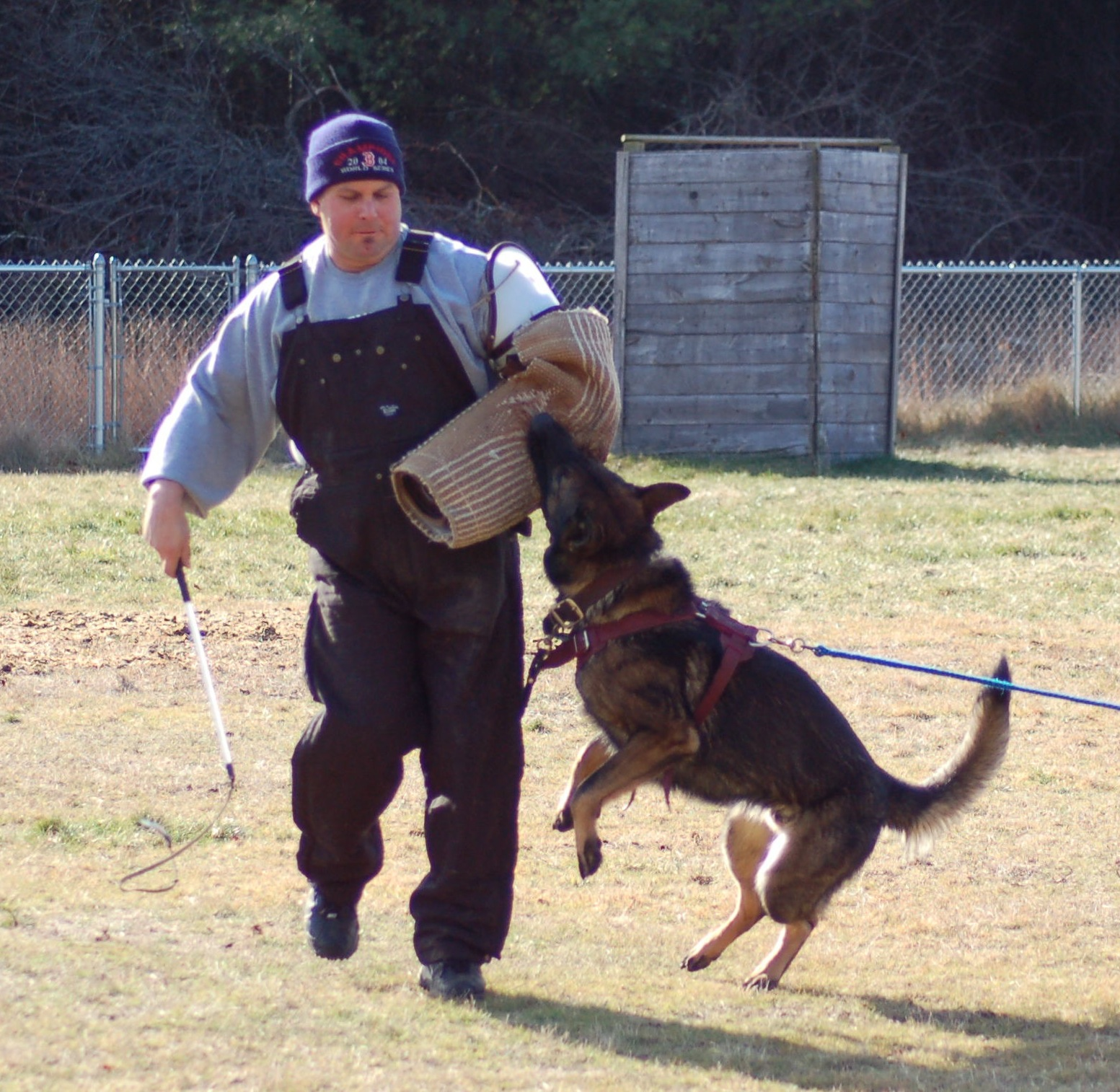
A decoy training a dog at a club meet

Schutzhund training, like the sport itself, has evolved over the years. Schutzhund is a hands-on sport. Though there are theory and techniques about training dogs, most training is done in clubs among other people and dogs. In a club environment, handlers and their dogs gather to practice techniques with the club equipment and experienced handlers in bite suits, called "decoys". Decoys have their own training and certification processes, and a decoy is important in training your dog.

A reliable source for training information is a good Schutzhund club. The overwhelming majority of Schutzhund training is done by owner/handlers at local clubs. There are very few clubs in the US, making books and videos a vital source of information in that country. In the US, most clubs are affiliated with the American Working Dog Federation (AWDF), United States Boxer Association (USBA), American Working Malinois Association (AWMA), United Schutzhund Clubs of America (USCA), Deutscher Verband der Gebrauchshundsportvereine (DVG), or German Shepherd Dog Club of America-Working Dog Association (GSDCA-WDA). Schutzhund clubs tend to be small, 20 or fewer members, because there is a limit to the number of dogs that can be trained in one session. Clubs often provide only limited formal assistance with tracking and obedience. To a certain extent, the clubs exist to provide the specialized resources needed to train the protection phase. However, a legitimate club will not permit a member to train only protection. Usually the more experienced members are willing to help the novice with tracking and obedience, though this is typically somewhat informal in the US.

Another function of Schutzhund clubs is to identify dogs that should not be trained in Schutzhund. Schutzhund is a challenging test of a dog's character, and not every dog, or even every GSD, is up to the challenge. The training director of the club has a responsibility to the dog, handler, club, and society to constantly evaluate every dog and to decline to train any dog with questionable character or working ability. Training a dog that does not really want to work is stressful and frustrating for all parties involved.

Schutzhund clubs regularly hold public trials, providing the opportunity for dogs to earn titles and for handlers to assess their training progress. A tiny number of dedicated handlers have trained their dogs to title readiness strictly from books and videos. This is unlikely to succeed in most cases, because it is almost impossible to train the protection phase without a helper. A good club should be considered a necessity for Schutzhund training.

=== Books and materials ===
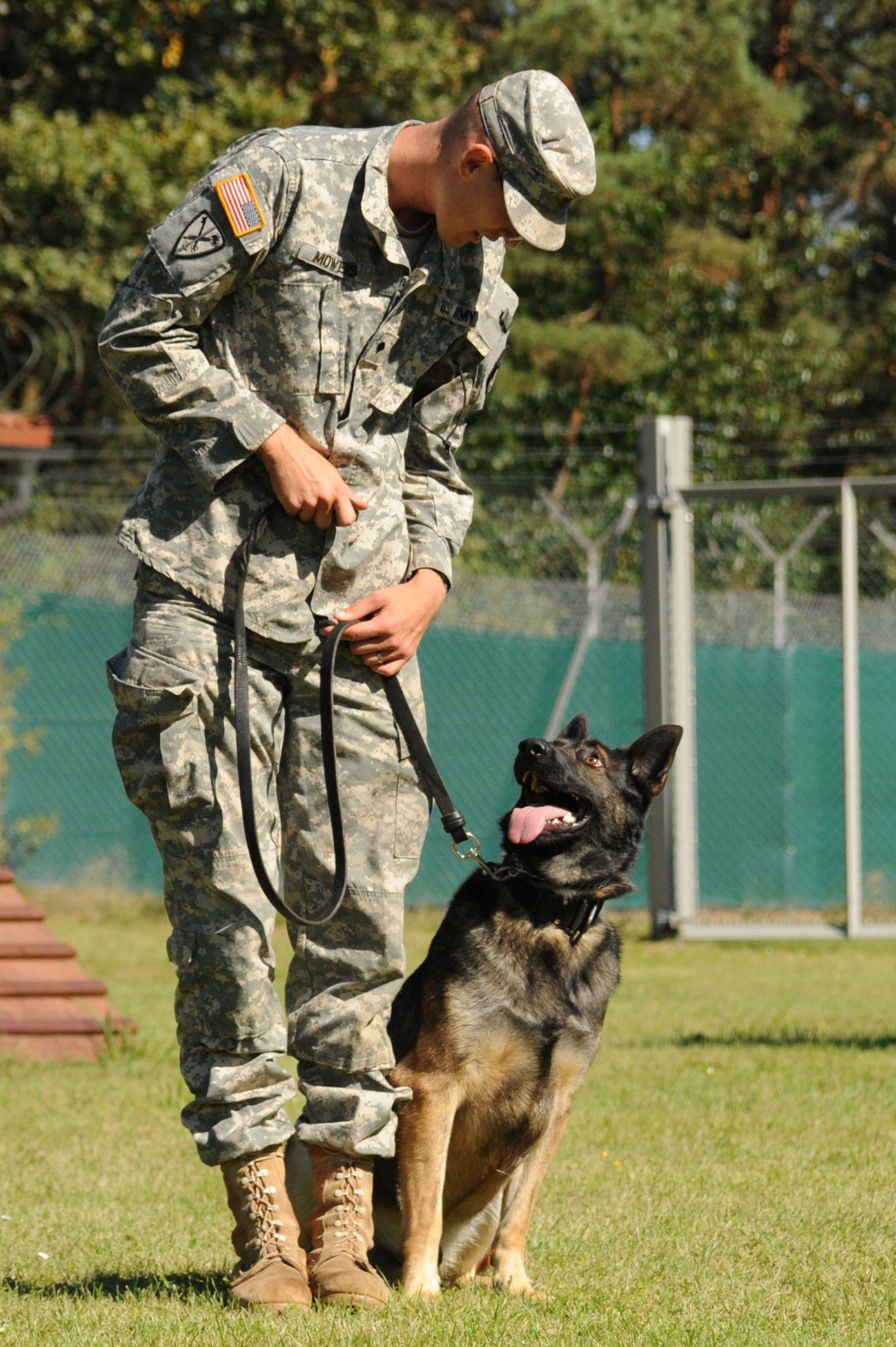
A soldier works on obedience training.

The definitive description of Schutzhund training in the first 50 years of the sport is Col. Konrad Most's Dog Training: A Manual, 1910. By modern standards, Most's training is very harsh and possibly abusive. Despite this, it is also structured, consistent, and in many ways conforms to more recent ideas on learning theory. Over time, the more brutal techniques fell out of use and few trainers still follow Most's program. In 1981, Helmut Raiser published Der Schutzhund, which radically changed Schutzhund protection training. In the US, the next great change in Schutzhund training is marked by the 1991 publication of Schutzhund Theory & Training Methods by Susan Barwig and Stewart Hilliard. Dr. Dietmar Schellenberg presents a remarkably comprehensive guide with detailed, step-by-step instructions on Schutzhund training and theory in his 1981 book Top Working Dogs, A Schutzhund Training Manual.

A number of other English-language books have been published on Schutzhund training. Some of the more influential books include Training the Competitive Working Dog by Tom Rose and Gary Patterson in 1985, Training the Behavior: Tips, Techniques and Theory for the Working Dog Trainer by Gary Patterson in 2006, and Schutzhund Obedience: Training in Drive with Gottfried Dildei, by Sheila Booth, 1992.

A recent innovation in providing information on Schutzhund training is the development of videos and DVDs. As with books, all videos and DVDs are not created equal. Viewers must exercise discretion when considering the techniques shown in videos. Just because a technique appears in a video (or book) does not mean that it is a good idea or that many Schutzhund trainers use it. There is a diversity of opinion on how to train Schutzhund dogs. This is reflected in the many conflicting opinions presented in the various videos.

== Organizations ==
Many of the senior organizations for the sport have German names and are usually referred to by their initials in English-speaking countries. This list shows some of the organizations involved with the sport and their relationships to each other.

Name	Abbrev.	Location	Description
Fédération Cynologique Internationale	FCI (Note: FCI—Fédération Cynologique Internationale (translation from French: International Cynological (canine) Federation))	Belgium	FCI is the international organization that publishes the rules for IGP titles.
Verband für das Deutsche Hundewesen	VDH (Note: VDH—Verband für das Deutsche Hundewesen (translation from German: Association for German Dogs))	Germany	VDH is the national-level all-breed kennel club of Germany; a member-club of FCI.
Arbeitsgemeinschaft der Zuchtvereine und Gebrauchshundverbände	AZG (Note: AZG—Arbeitsgemeinschaft der Zuchtvereine und Gebrauchshundverbände (translation from German: Working group of breeding clubs and working dog associations))	Germany	AZG sets the rules for Schutzhund for all breeds. The AZG is one of the component organizations of the VDH.
Verein für Deutsche Schäferhunde	SV (Note: SV—Verein für Deutsche Schäferhunde (translation from German: Association for German Shepherd Dogs))	Germany	SV is a member of VDH and a most powerful influence on the sport. Although the AZG formally sets the rules, the AZG does nothing with respect to Schutzhund without the approval of the SV. The SV has great influence within the FCI and is probably the most powerful influence on the sport.
Deutscher Verband der Gebrauchshundsportvereine	DVG (Note: DVG—Deutscher Verband der Gebrauchshundsportvereine (translation from German: German Association of Utility Dog Sports Clubs))	Germany	DVG is an all-breed dog sport organization in Germany that organizes clubs and trials and has branches in Canada and US.
DVG America		U.S.	DVG-America is an all-breed Schutzhund club; member of DVG.
United Schutzhund Clubs of America	USCA	U.S.	USCA is the largest Schutzhund organization in the US; it is also a German Shepherd Dog breed club.
American Working Dog Association	AWDA	U.S.	AWDA is a Schutzhund club for law enforcement and associated trades, for training police dogs and search and rescue dogs.
American Working Dog Federation	AWDF	U.S.	AWDF is an umbrella organization for USA Schutzhund clubs. Has applied with FCI to be the recognized US organization.
United Doberman Club	UDC	U.S.	UDC is a Schutzhund club for Dobermans; member club of AWDF.

In response to political forces in Germany, in 2004 the Verein für Deutsche Schäferhunde (SV) and the Deutscher Hundesportverein (DHV) made substantial changes to Schutzhund. The DHV adopted the Fédération Cynologique Internationale (FCI) rules that govern IPO titles, so that at least on paper the SV and DHV gave up control of the sport to the FCI. The DHV changed the name of the titles from "SchH" (Schutzhund) to "VPG" (Vielseitigkeitsprüfung für Gebrauchshunde, which roughly translates Versatility examination for working dogs). The SV has retained the "SchH" title names, but otherwise conforms to the DHV/FCI rules.

== Related protection sports ==
- Mondioring: obedience, agility (jumps) and protection
- French Ring Sport: jumps, complex obedience, and several variants of attacks on a decoy (helper wearing bite-protection gear)
- KNPV: Dutch, obedience and bite-work, no tracking

== See also ==
- List of protection sports
