= David Sheldrick =

Kenyan farmer and park warden (1919-1977)

- Born: 23 November 1919; Alexandria, Egypt
- Died: 13 June 1977 (aged 57); Nairobi, Kenya
- Occupations: Farmer and park warden
- Known for: David Sheldrick Wildlife Trust

Major David Leslie William Sheldrick, MBE (23 November 1919 – 13 June 1977) was a Kenyan farmer and park warden. His widow Dame Daphne Sheldrick founded the David Sheldrick Wildlife Trust in his honor.

== Early years ==
David Sheldrick, an only child, came to Kenya as an infant with his parents. His father had served with the British Remounts during World War I, resettled near Nyeri and became a coffee farmer at Mweiga.

== World War II ==
Educated at the Canford School, David Sheldrick returned to Kenya until World War II began in 1939. He served in the King's African Rifles (KAR), seeing active service in Abyssinia and Burma. He was promoted to Major, the youngest officer in the KAR to achieve this rank.

== Tsavo ==
At the age of 28 in 1948, David Sheldrick became the founding Warden of Tsavo, Kenya's largest National Park. With the assistance of the Game Department and National Parks, Sheldrick combated armed poachers. He studied every facet of the elephants' lifestyle on the preserve, collecting data on their food sources and, along with his wife, Daphne, rescuing and hand-rearing vulnerable elephants.

Sheldrick helped to develop the Tsavo's infrastructure. There were no roads or buildings when he first arrived. He paved 1,087 kilometres of tourist all-weather roads, 853 miles of administrative roads and 287 kilometres of anti-poaching tracks. He also oversaw the construction of a concrete causeway across the Galana River.

== Legacy ==
Sheldrick died from a heart attack in 1977 at the age of 57. His widow established the David Sheldrick Wildlife Trust (now known as the Sheldrick Wildlife Trust) in his memory. Among other activities the trust runs a nursery for orphaned elephants and other animals in Nairobi National Park.

The 21 meter-high Sheldrick Falls in Shimba Hills National Reserve were named after him. Sheldrick's reed frog (Hyperolius sheldricki) is named in his honour.
