= Belgian Shepherd =

Belgian breed of dog

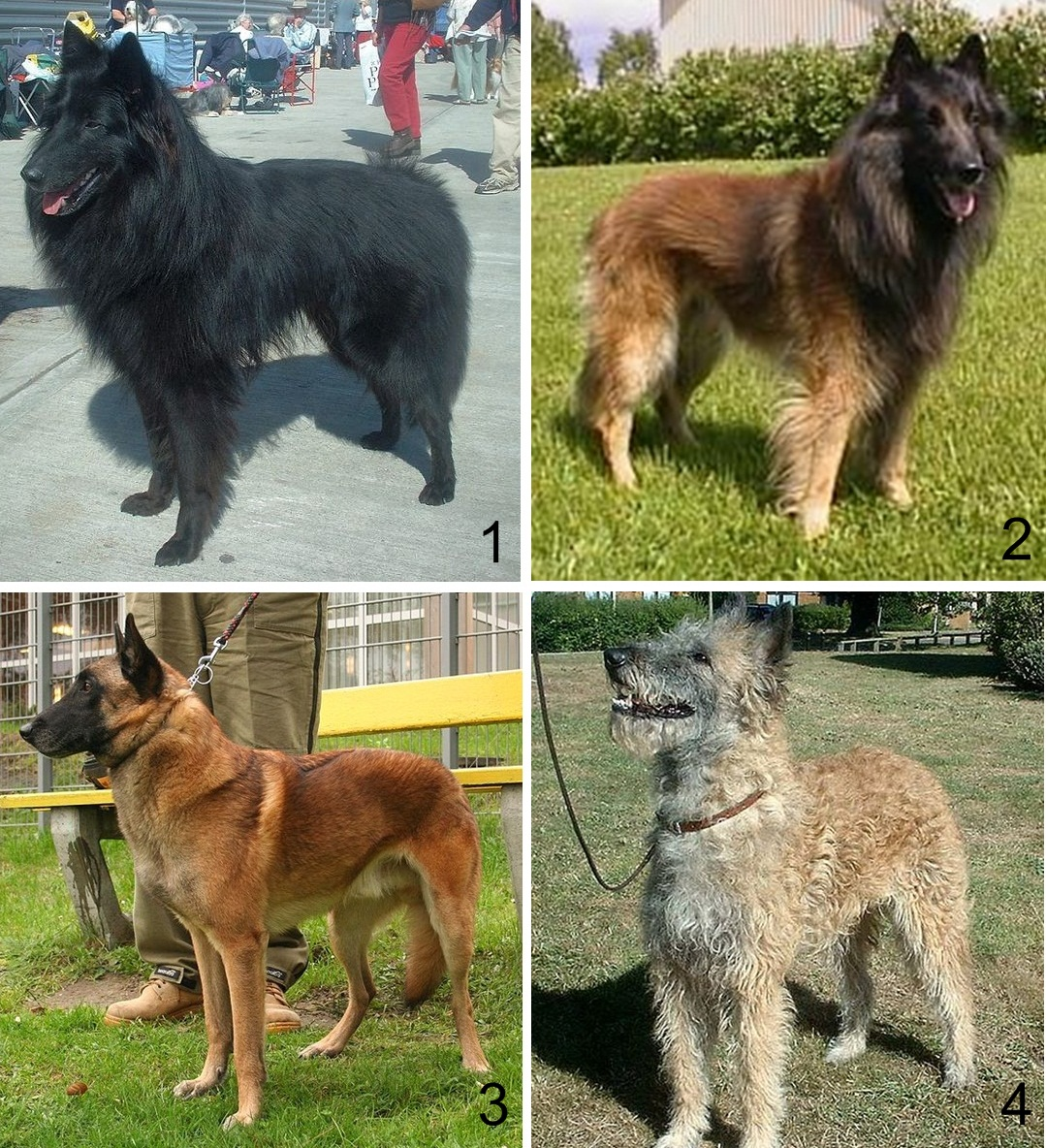
- Belgian Shepherd varieties: Groenendael (1), Tervueren (2), Malinois (3) and Laekenois (4)
- Other names: Belgische Herder; Belgische Herdershond; Belgian Sheepdog; Chien de Berger Belge
- Origin: Belgium
Traits
Height	Males	60–66 cm (24–26 in)
	Females	56–62 cm (22–24 in)
Weight	Males	≈ 25–30 kg (55–65 lb)
	Females	≈ 20–25 kg (45–55 lb)
- Coat: Varies by variety
- Colour: Varies by variety
Kennel club standards
- Fédération Cynologique Internationale: standard

Groenendael
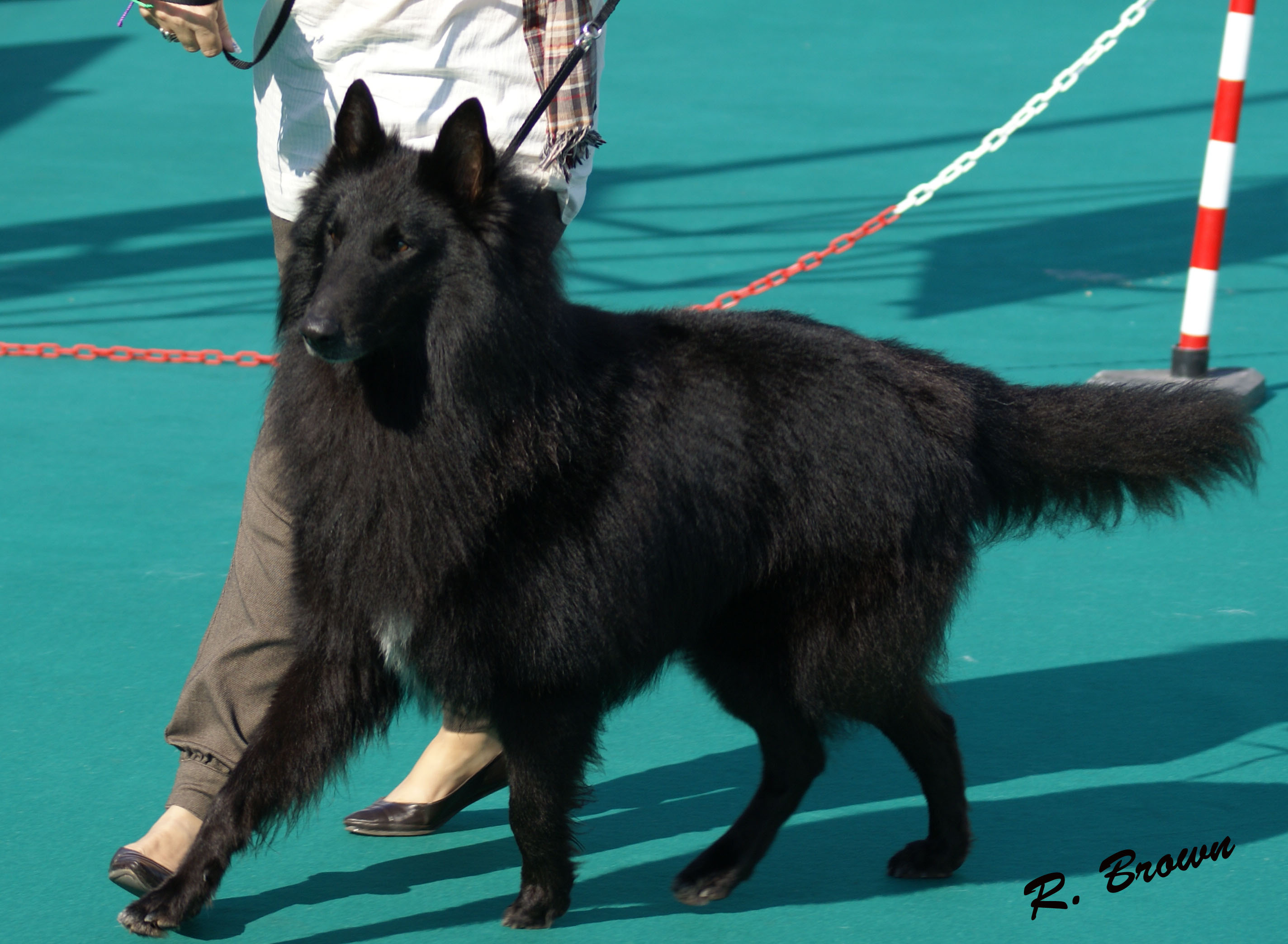
- Other names: Groenendaler
Traits
- Coat: Long-haired
- Colour: Solid black
Kennel club standards
- Société Royale Saint-Hubert: standard

Laekenois
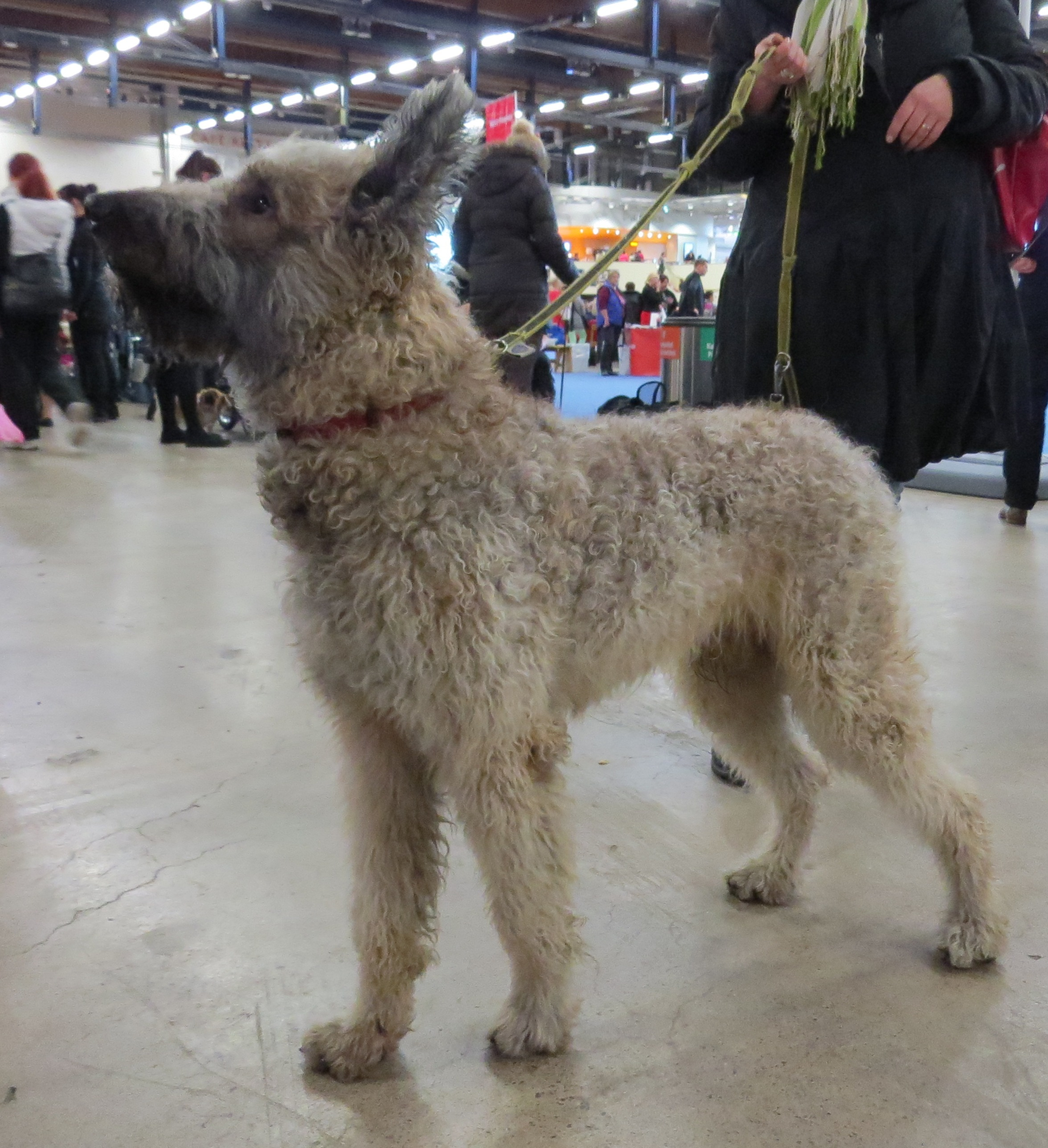
- Other names: Lakense
Traits
- Coat: Rough-haired
- Colour: Fawn with traces of black overlay in coat and mask
Kennel club standards
- Société Royale Saint-Hubert: standard

Malinois
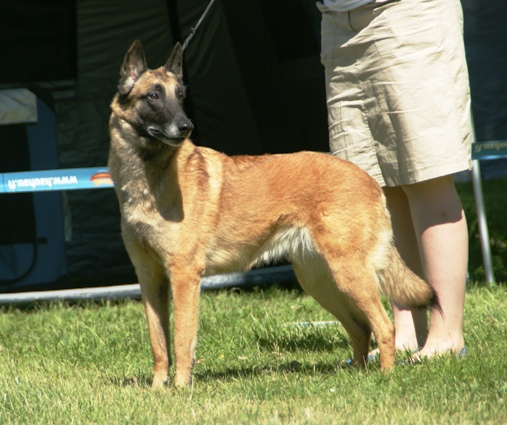
- Other names: Mechelaar
Traits
- Coat: Short-haired
- Colour: Fawn with black overlay and a black mask
Kennel club standards
- Société Royale Saint-Hubert: standard

Tervueren
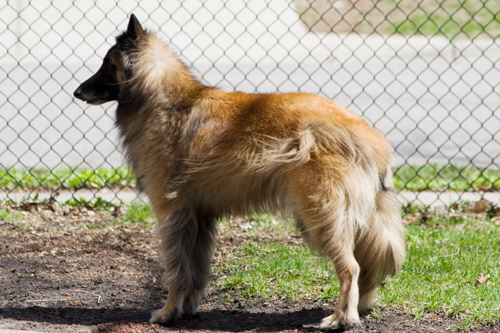
- Other names: Tervuren
Traits
- Coat: Long-haired
- Colour: Fawn or grey with black overlay and a black mask
Kennel club standards
- Société Royale Saint-Hubert: standard

The Belgian Shepherd (Dutch: Belgische Herder), also known as the Belgian Sheepdog (Dutch: Belgische Herdershond) or the Chien de Berger Belge, is a Belgian breed of herding dog of medium size. It is bred in four distinct varieties based on coat type and colour: the long-haired black Groenendael; the rough-haired fawn Laekenois; the short-haired fawn Malinois, and the long-haired fawn Tervueren. The American Kennel Club considers the four varieties to be separate breeds.

The breed descends from a common type of shepherd dog found throughout Western Europe that includes such modern breeds as the Bouvier des Ardennes, Dutch Shepherd and German Shepherd, and was a common sight in the service of Belgian shepherds for centuries. At the end of the nineteenth century a breed club was formed and attempts were made to standardise the breed.

Its historical role was as a herding dog. It is also commonly kept as a companion dog, or used as an assistance dog, detection dog, guard dog, guide dog, police dog or search and rescue dog. It has a long history of being used by Belgian police as well as military forces, serving for Belgian armed forces in both World Wars. In the twenty-first century it is in use by a number of armed forces worldwide in a variety of roles.

== History ==
The Belgian Shepherd descends from the same common type of herding dog as similar Western European breeds such as the Bouvier des Ardennes, the Dutch Shepherd and the German Shepherd, and for centuries was used by Belgian shepherds for this task. Unlike in other European countries where, throughout the nineteenth century, shepherd breeds were standardised and breeders made efforts to perpetuate their breeds, by the end of the 1800s the Belgian Shepherd was becoming obsolete and was at danger of extinction.

In 1891, the Club de Chien Berger Belge was formed with the purpose of saving the type and a team led by Adolphe Reul of the Cureghem Veterinary School conducted a field survey of the type. As the Belgian Shepherd had for centuries been bred for working ability with little consideration given to form, Reul found the type to vary greatly in appearance. As a part of their work, Reul's team assembled 117 specimens and began the process of standardising them into distinct varieties.

Classifying them as a single breed, initially Reul's team divided the breed into six different varieties based on coat type and colour. Between 1892 when the first breed standard was drafted and 1956, as few as two varieties and as many as eight were recognised by either the Club de Chien Berger Belge or the Société Royale Saint-Hubert.

In 1905, it was decided that interbreeding between the different varieties should be forbidden. The disruptions caused by the First World War resulted in a decline in breed numbers, so in 1920 it was decided matings between the varieties should be allowed in order to preserve the breed and avoid issues resulting from inbreeding. The Second World War again threatened the viability of the breed. In late 1945, it was decided that matings between dogs of the different varieties was to be encouraged, and through careful breeding the Belgian Shepherd recovered in numbers. In 1956, the current breed standard was adopted. It specified the four varieties known today, the Groenendael, Laekenois, Malinois and Tervueren.

The Groenendael variety is believed to have been created in 1885 by Nicholas Rose, owner of the Château de Groenendael. Rose owned a long-haired, black Belgian Shepherd bitch called "Petite", liking her look so much he spent over a year searching for a suitable mate, eventually finding a dog named "Piccard D'Uccle" who belonged to a shepherd called Mr Beernaert. These two are considered the foundation stock of the variety. Their finest progeny were called "Duc de Groenendael" and "Barroness" who were mated widely to Belgian Shepherds of different appearances with the black progeny retained.

Initially Rose had wanted to name the variety the "Rose", but it was deemed this could cause confusion given their black colour, so they were named after his château, Groenendael. During the First World War, Groenendaels were used by the Belgian Army to locate wounded soldiers and carry messages. Their bravery was recognised by U.S. soldiers during the war and examples were imported to the U.S. in the following years. To this day in the US the name Belgian Shepherd or Belgian Sheepdog is commonly used to refer to the Groenendael.

The Malinois variety was said to be the first variety to breed true to type and initially they became so well known in Belgium that at one time the other varieties were collectively called "other-than-Malinois", it was the Malinois that the other varieties were gauged against. The variety takes its name from the Mechelen region (called Malines in French), where it was the predominant coat type used by the local shepherds.

The Laekenois variety has always been the rarest. They take their name from the Château de Laeken, a residence of the Belgian royal family. The Laekenois was a favourite of Queen Marie Henriette, who frequently watched them in the service of the shepherds who grazed the royal domains around the château. This patronage contributed to their popularity at the time. In addition to being used as herding dogs, rough-haired Belgian Shepherds were traditionally used as guard dogs in the regions surrounding Boom, guarding valuable linens put out to bleach in the sun.

The Tervueren variety is believed to have been created when a brewer, M. Corbeel, bred his fawn long-haired Belgian Shepherd pair "Tom" and "Poes", one of their progeny was a long-haired fawn bitch named "Miss" who was purchased by a M. Deanhieux. Miss was bred with Duc de Groenendael, the foundation sire of the Groenendael variety, and the fawn progeny became the Tervueren variety who take their name from the region of Tervuren. The Tervueren variety is considered particularly robust and healthy and in Europe a number of breeders use them to reinforce the bloodlines of other varieties, particularly the Groenendael.

The Groenendael remains the most numerous variety, followed by the Tervueren. The number of Malinois is growing, while the Laekenois remains comparatively rare.

=== Kennel club classification ===
Most of the world's national kennel clubs including the Société Royale Saint-Hubert, as well as the Fédération Cynologique Internationale, recognise the Belgian Shepherd as a single breed with four distinct varieties. The American Kennel Club recognises the four varieties as separate breeds, leading to some difficulties for American breeders who breed from imported European stock: European Groenendaels in particular can whelp Tervueren-coloured pups; in most of the world these can be registered as Tervuerens, whereas in the United States they would be disqualified from registration.

== Appearance ==
The Belgian Shepherd is a medium-sized athletic breed with a body built for endurance. Dogs typically stand between 56 and 66 cm (22 and 26 in), with bitches being on average 4 cm (2 in) shorter than dogs. They usually weigh between 20 and 30 kg (45 and 65 lb). The breed standard states the ideal height is 62 cm (24 in) for dogs and 58 cm (23 in) for bitches. The breed has a large, long head with triangular, erect ears that are rounded at the base, and a broad, long muzzle.

According to the breed standard a dog that stands 62 centimetres at the withers should have a head 25 cm (9.8 in) long and a muzzle approximately half that length. The body is muscular but not overly heavy. Body length from shoulder to haunches is approximately the same as the height at the withers, proportionally slightly longer in bitches; the topline is straight and the belly neither low-slung nor overly high like that of a sighthound.

The chest is deep but not overly broad. The neck is muscular, widening at the shoulders with a slight arch at the nape. The tail is strong and of medium length, and curves upwards slightly at the level of the knee. The forelegs are straight and well boned, the hind legs muscular and powerful. The legs are not overly heavy.

=== Varieties ===
The four varieties vary principally in their coat types and colours. The breed standard describes three coat varieties: long-haired, short-haired and rough-haired. Long-haired dogs have a long, smooth coat with short hair on their faces, ears and legs although there is long feathering on the rear of the legs. They have an abundant mane on their neck and chest, particularly long hair on the rear of their thighs and a bushy tail that forms a plume.

Short-haired dogs have particularly short hair on the faces, ears and lower portion of their legs, short over the rest of the body and slightly longer on the neck and tail. Rough-haired dogs have a coat that is rough, dry and approximately 6 cm (2.4 in) long over the body. They have shorter hair on the top of the muzzle and legs and, unlike the other coat types, they have long hair on the face and muzzle.

==== Groenendael ====
The Groenendael variety is long-haired. It has a solid black double coat. The outer coat is straight and particularly long around the shoulders, neck and chest. They have short hair on the face, and well-feathered legs and tail.

==== Laekenois ====
The Laekenois variety is rough-haired. Its coat is fawn in colour with discreet black overlay and is harsh, dry and normally slightly tangled in appearance. It has a bristled, feathered muzzle and limited feathering on the legs and tail. According to the breed standard, black overlay means the tips of the hair are black, but not in patches or stripes such as brindle.

==== Malinois ====
The Malinois variety is short-haired. It is fawn in colour with black overlay, with a charcoal-coloured face and extremities.

==== Tervueren ====
The Tervueren variety is long-haired like the Groenendael. Its double coat is typically fawn in colour with black overlay and with black extremities, although grey with black is known. It has a ruff of long hair around the neck and feathering on the legs.

== Temperament ==
Belgian Shepherds are known to be highly intelligent, alert and sensitive. They are typically highly trainable, vigilant and hard-working with a strong guarding instinct making them protective of property and family, and very well suited for service with security services. The Groenendael and Tervueren varieties have a reputation for occasionally being snappy, making them less suitable as companion dogs for children; the Laekenois, whilst considered very good with children, can occasionally be troublesome with other dogs.

The Belgian Shepherd responds well to training, and requires training ideally from an early age. The breed is very active – particularly the Malinois, which may reflect its continued breeding for security roles. While Belgian Shepherds of all coat types require ample exercise, the breed adapts well to living indoors.

== Use ==
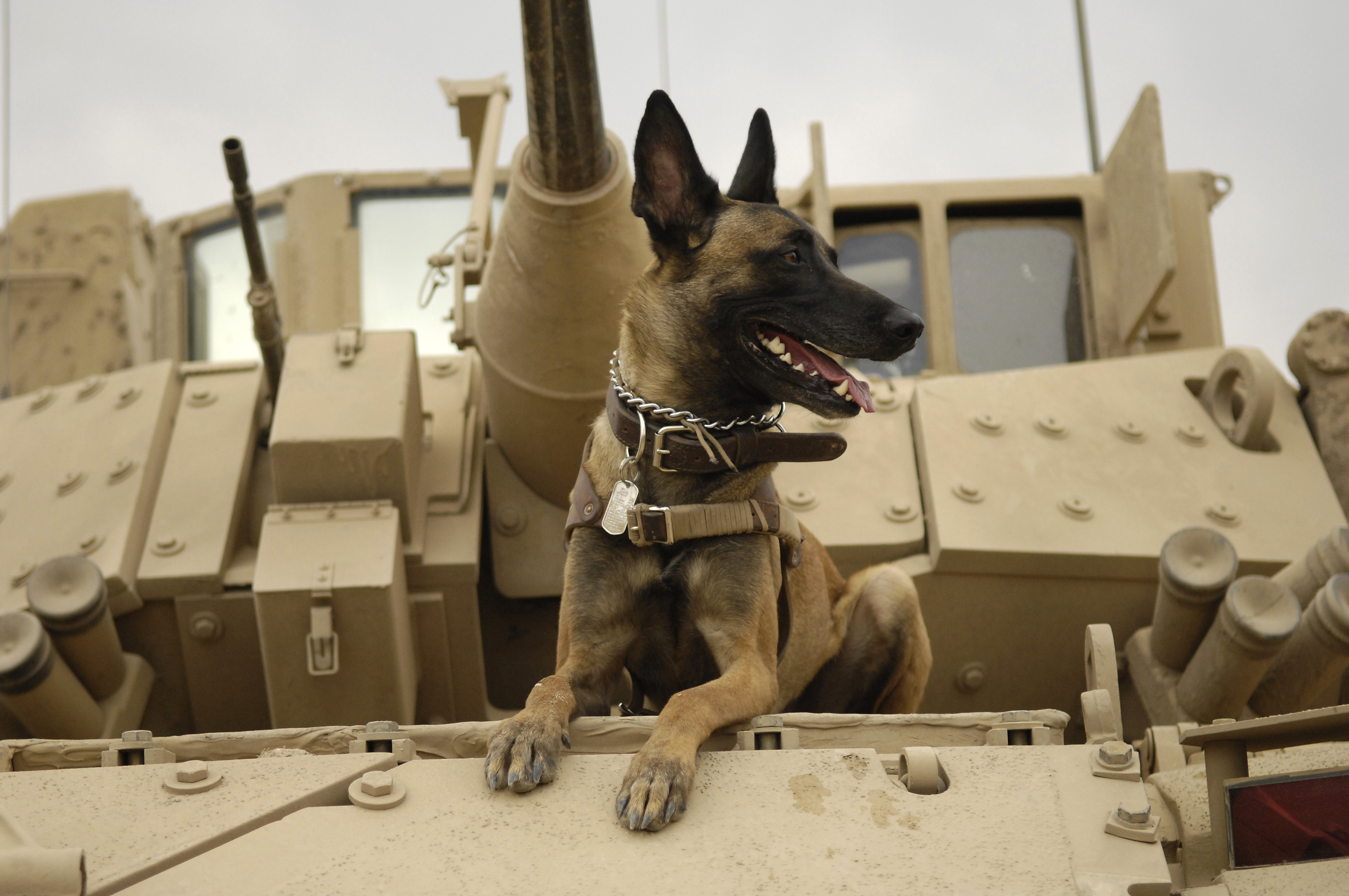
A Malinois on a Bradley in Iraq

The Belgian Shepherd, particularly in the Groenendael, Laekenois and Tervueren varieties, is predominantly kept as a pet or companion dog; all of the varieties may compete in obedience competitions and Schutzhund. The dogs are versatile and are often trained for use as assistance dogs, detection dogs, guard dogs, guide dogs, police dogs, and search and rescue dogs.

In recent times, the Laekenois has been employed by the Belgian Army in a variety of roles, in addition to the longstanding use of the Malinois. The Tervueren is frequently used by government organisations as a drug detection dog. The Malinois in particular has become increasingly popular with customs, military, border guard and police forces.

Organisations that utilise the Malinois include the United States Armed Forces, the United States Secret Service, the Israel Defense Forces' Oketz Unit, the Australian Defence Force, and the anti-poaching canine unit at the Kruger National Park.

== Health ==
A 2024 UK study found a life expectancy of 12 years for the Malinois and 13.8 years for the Tervueren compared to an average of 12.7 for purebreeds and 12 for crossbreeds. The Société Royale Saint-Hubert recommends all four varieties are tested for hip and elbow dysplasia and that the Malinois be tested for epilepsy. The working lines of the Malinois have been associated with rage syndrome. A genetic polymorphism in the dopamine transporter gene has been linked to rage syndrome, and dogs at risk of passing the genotype on to offspring can be identified through genetic testing.

== Notable examples ==
- Conan, a United States Army Malinois that assisted in the capture and killing of Abu Bakr al-Baghdadi.
- Diesel, a French police Malinois that was posthumously awarded the PDSA Dickin Medal after she was killed in the 2015 Saint-Denis raid.
- K9 Killer, a Kruger National Park anti-poaching dog Malinois awarded the PDSA Gold Medal for assisting in the capture of 115 poachers.
- Kuga, an Australian Army Malinois awarded the Dickin Medal after capturing an insurgent whilst shot during the War in Afghanistan.
- Mali, a British Army Malinois awarded the Dickin Medal after completing a mission whilst injured during the War in Afghanistan.
