= Angama Mara Airport =

Airport in Kenya

- IATA: ANA; ICAO: n/a

Summary
- Owner: Kenya Airports Authority
- Location: Angama Mara; Narok County; Kenya
- Elevation AMSL: 6,171 ft / 1,881 m
- Coordinates: 01°16′18″S 34°57′38″E

Map
- Location within Kenya

Runways
Direction	Length		Surface
Direction	ft	m	Surface
09/27	4,134	1,260	Tarmac

Angama Mara Airport (IATA: ANA, ICAO: n/a) is a small airport near Angama Mara in Narok County, Kenya. The airport serves the local areas of the Maasai Mara, national park and nature reserve. The airport was formerly known as Angama Mara Airstrip. In August 2021, the Kenya Airports Authority (KAA) began phased improvements and expansion to convert it to a fully fledged airport.

== Location ==
The airport is located near Angama Mara, in the Maasai Mara Game Reserve, in Narok County, approximately 120 kilometres (75 mi), by road, southwest of Narok, the county headquarters. Angama Mara Airport is located about 278 kilometres (173 mi) by road, west of Nairobi, the national capital and about 134 kilometres (83 mi) by air, with flying time of about 40 minutes. The geographical coordinates of this airport are 01°16'18.0"S, 34°57'38.0"E (Latitude:-1.271667; Longitude:34.960556).

== Overview ==
The airport sits on 44.7 hectares (110 acres) of land, acquired by the National Land Commission of Kenya (NLC), from Manati Limited. It is expected that after the current three-phase upgrade and improvements, the airport can accommodate direct international flights, becoming the fifth international airport in the country.

== Upgrade to Airport status ==
The three-phased airport upgrade started with widening the 1,260 metres (4,134 ft) long runway from 18 metres (59 ft) to 23 metres (75 ft). The main objective for he improvements and upgrade is to enable the airport accommodate larger aircraft, (code C aircraft), enabling foreign tourist direct access, increasing tourism and trade.

Other infrastructure developments in Phase One include the construction of a perimeter fence and a new airport apron.

== Other considerations ==
The improvement and upgrade of Angama Mara Airport is part of a project to upgrade six airstrips, including Angama Mara Airport in Narok County and Lanet Airport in Nakuru County, where the scope of work was almost 12 percent complete as of August 29021. A total of KSh691 million (approx. US$6.4 million), was set aside in 2018 by KAA, for his purpose.

== See also ==
- List of airports in Kenya
- Maasai Mara
