= Narok North Constituency =

Kenyan electoral constituency

Narok North
- constituency for the Parliament of Kenya
- Narok North Constituency within Narok County

- Narok County within Kenya
- County: Narok
- Population: 251,862
- Area: 2,159 km^{2} (833.6 sq mi)

Current constituency
- Number of members: 1
- Party: JP
- Member of Parliament: Agnes Mantaine Pareyio
- Wards: 6

Narok North is an electoral constituency in Kenya. It is one of six constituencies of Narok County. The constituency was established for the 1969 elections. Its current Member of Parliament is Hon. Agnes Mantaine Pareyio who also happens to be the first Woman to occupy the much coveted seat — marking a historic milestone in the constituency's political journey and opening a new chapter of women's representation and leadership.

== Members of Parliament ==
| Elections | MP | Party | Notes |
|---|---|---|---|
| 1969 | Moses ole Marima | KANU | One-party system |
| 1974 | Justus Kandet ole Tipis | KANU | One-party system |
| 1979 | Justus Kandet ole Tipis | KANU | One-party system |
| 1983 | Justus Kandet ole Tipis | KANU | One-party system. |
| 1988 | William Ole Ntimama | KANU | One-party system. |
| 1992 | William Ole Ntimama | KANU | |
| 1997 | William Ole Ntimama | KANU | |
| 2002 | William Ole Ntimama | NARC | |
| 2007 | William Ole Ntimama | ODM | |
| 2013 | Richard Moitalel Ole Kenta | TNA | |
| 2017 | Richard Moitalel Ole Kenta | ODM | |
| 2022 | Agnes Mantaine Pareyio | JP | |

== WARDS ==
Narok North constituency has a total of six(6) wards that elect a member of county assembly.

1. Narok Town 29,452
2. Melili 15,079
3. Olorropil 13,829
4. Olokurto 11,038
5. Olpusimoru 9,298
6. Nkareta. 8,351 IEBC data 2022

== Locations ==
Locations
| Location | Population* |
| Enabelibeli | 11,218 |
| Enoosupukia | 11,888 |
| Entiyani | 8,238 |
| Entontol | 9,299 |
| Ildamat | 3,084 |
| Keekonyokie | 14,672 |
| Lower Melil | 37,710 |
| Mosiro | 3,460 |
| Ntulele | 13,114 |
| Olchorro | 12,566 |
| Oletukat | 1,742 |
| Olokurto | 13,027 |
| Ololpironito | 4,685 |
| Olorropil | 10,750 |
| Olpusimoru | 12,611 |
| Ongata naado | 4,335 |
| Suswa | 7,616 |
| Upper Melili | 11,412 |
| Total | x |
1999 census.

Wards
| Ward | Registered Voters | Local Authority |
| Angata naado | 1,655 | Narok County |
| Enabelbel | 3,729 | Narok County |
| Enoosupukia | 3,362 | Narok County |
| Entiyani | 2,248 | Narok County |
| Entontol | 3,017 | Narok County |
| Ildamat | 2,538 | Narok County |
| Ilmasharian / Morijo | 1,396 | Narok town |
| Keekonyokie | 4,039 | Narok County |
| Masikonde | 4,273 | Narok town |
| Mosiro | 1,087 | Narok County |
| Naisoya | 1,371 | Narok town |
| Nkairamiram | 993 | Narok town |
| Nkareta East | 1,218 | Narok town |
| Nkareta North | 531 | Narok town |
| Ntulele | 3,045 | Narok County |
| Olchoro | 3,568 | Narok County |
| Oleleshwa | 1,182 | Narok town |
| Oletukat | 746 | Narok County |
| Olokurto | 4,001 | Narok County |
| Olopito | 1,300 | Narok town |
| Olorropil | 3,298 | Narok County |
| Olpusimoru | 3,619 | Narok County |
| Stadium | 2,753 | Narok town |
| Suswa | 2,393 | Narok County |
| Upper Melili | 2,875 | Narok County |
| Total | 60,237 | |
*September 2005.
