= Salaʼs Camp =

Safari lodge in Narok County, Kenya

Sala’s Camp is a safari lodge in Masai Mara – a large national game reserve in Narok County, Kenya. It is traditionally tented safari style with transparent glass front and modern interior designs providing lodgers clear game views while indoor. It has a mess tent and seven sleeping tents. The camp is located in the southern part of Masai Mara close to the confluence of Sand River and Keekerok along the northern corridor of the Serengeti towards border with Tanzania.

Sala’s Camp is one of the first camps to see the annual wildebeest migration occurring between June and September and witnesses frequent appearance of the “Big 5” - lion, leopard, rhinoceros, elephant, and African buffalo. The camp seats in an area less than two kilometers to the Tanzania border with a good view of the Serengeti National Park.

Sala’s Camp supports anti-poaching monitoring and conservation initiatives for black rhino and pangolin and critically endangered species.
