= Sianto Sikawa =

Kenyan model and businesswoman

Sianto Marley Sikawa
- Born: 1990 (age 35–36); Narok, Kenya
- Citizenship: Kenyan
- Education: Daystar University (Bachelor of Arts in Communication, Electronic Media & Public Relations); United States International University Africa (Master of Arts in International Relations)
- Occupations: Tourism coordinator, fashion model & philanthropist
- Years active: 2011–present
- Title: Assistant director, Tourism and Wildlife for Narok County

Marley Sianto Sikawa (born c. 1990) is a Kenyan communications and marketing professional, who has served as a tourism marketing coordinator. She is currently the assistant director of Tourism and Wildlife Narok County, one of the 47 administrative Kenyan counties.

== Early life and education ==
Sikawa was born in Narok, in Narok County, approximately 144 kilometres (89 mi), by road, west of Nairobi, Kenya's capital city. Her family moved frequently and she grew up in Narok, Maasai Mara, Sekenani and Loita.

After attending Siana Boarding Primary School locally in Maasai Mara, she attended Moi Siongiroi Girls' Secondary School in Bomet County. She was then admitted to Daystar University, in Nairobi, where she graduated with a Bachelor of Arts in Communication, Electronic Media & Public Relations degree. She then enrolled in the United States International University Africa, also in Nairobi, where she pursued a Master of Arts in International Relations.

== Career ==
As of November 2014, Sikawa was employed by the government of Narok County as the tourism marketing coordinator. She is currently the assistant director Tourism and Wildlife.

She is also active in her community, where she has helped the local women access solar electricity through Naretoi Ang’, a non profit organisation that operates the Solar for Manyatta projects in the community on matters of conservation of wildlife with the community, cultural preservation by documentation and education of the community in health and school sponsorship linkage.

She is a board member of the Sacred Nature Initiative (SNI) by Jonathan and Angela Scott.

She is also a social media influencer on matters of travel, culture and sports. She is on the social media team for the Aligned Alliance team by Rhonda Vetere, the strategic manager for Uzani Weightlifting, founded by the Kenyan Olympic weightlifter Webstar Lukose.

== Family ==
Sikawa is a mother to one daughter.

== Other considerations ==
In September 2018, Business Daily Africa, a Kenyan daily newspaper, named Sikawa among the "Top 40 Under 40 Women in Kenya in 2018".

In the past, Sikawa won the Miss Narok Beauty Pageant. In 2015, at age 24, she was crowned Miss Tourism Narok County and Miss Tourism Kenya. She walked the catwalk at the 2015 New York Fashion Week, modeling Spring/Summer 2015 collections by Tamil International fashion house.
