= Olare Motorogi Conservancy =

Kenyan community-based conservation area

Coordinates: 1°22′55″S 35°08′14″E

Olare Motorogi Conservancy is a 140-square-kilometer (54-square-mile) community-based conservation area in Kenya, part of the Maasai Mara-Serengeti ecosystem and wildlife dispersal zone. It borders the Maasai Mara National Reserve. It was founded in 2006 as part of a new community conservancy concept.

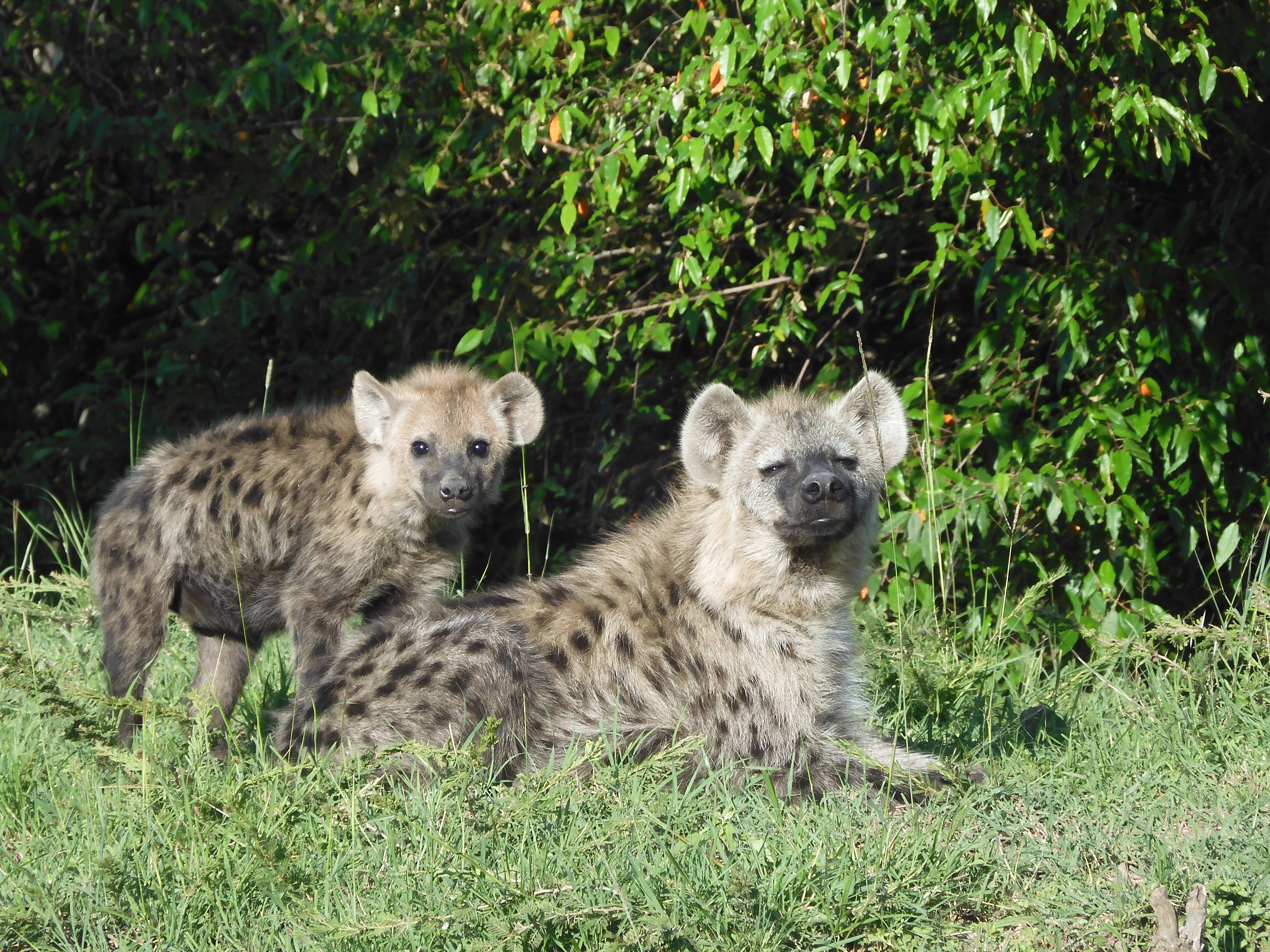
Spotted hyenas in Olare Motorogi Conservancy

== Community conservancy concept ==
The community conservancy concept is part of a new model of safari-tourism designed to create a mutually beneficial partnership between the Maasai and the tour operators. Instead of buying the land off the Maasai, the land is leased for the purpose of wildlife conservation. This is preferable for the Maasai as they have a guaranteed annual income (the amount paid is per acre not per guest) and they retain ownership of the land. Tourism also generates employment as the camp staff, guides and conservancy rangers are all drawn from the families of the Maasai landowners. In return the Maasai vacate the lands removing all sedentary homesteads or livestock bomas within the conservancy. This allows grass and vegetation to recover from overgrazing.

Each conservancy has a warden and a ranger to protect the wildlife and these are paid by the tour operators. Poaching is rare in the conservancy as the Maasai are engaged with the conservation of the wildlife and earn an income from tourism and conservation.

The community conservancy concept benefits the tour operators as they have exclusive access to land within the Mara ecosystem which is famed for its big cats and the great wildebeest migration. The Masai Mara National Reserve covers only a small portion of the Mara ecosystem and can at times become crowded.

By employing the Maasai they have knowledgeable guides with generations of experience which provides guests with an authentic safari experience. The Koiyaki Guiding School has been created to train school leavers and provides the opportunity for a career in the conservancies.

To prevent overdevelopment or exploitation the number of beds within the conservancy is limited to 94 which equates to a ratio of one game viewing vehicle per 2,100 acres. To further reduce the impact of tourism the camps are mobile with no foundations and are run on eco-friendly principles – energy, sewage and refuse disposal are all certified by Ecotourism Kenya.

There are five safari camps within the Olare Motorogi Conservancy - Porini Lion Camp, Kicheche Bush Camp, Mara Plains Camp, Olare Mara Kempinski and Mahali Mzuri by Virgin Limited Edition.
