= Mara Triangle =

Kenyan protected area

- IUCN category II (national park)
- Location within Kenya
- Location: Narok County, Kenya
- Coordinates: 1°24′24″S 34°54′24″E
- Area: 510 km^{2} (200 sq mi)
- Governing body: Mara Conservancy

The Mara Triangle is the southwestern part of the Maasai Mara National Reserve, Kenya, and is managed by the not-for-profit organisation The Mara Conservancy on behalf of Trans-Mara County Council.

Divided from the rest of the Maasai Mara National Reserve by the Mara River, the Mara Triangle is less visited and less crowded, with a fairly good concentration of wildlife all year-round including the Big Five (lion, leopard, elephant, buffalo and rhino) and diverse plains 'game' such as cheetah, hyena, jackal, wildebeest, zebra, giraffe, waterbuck and many other species.

The Mara Triangle is one of the areas where herds of the Great Migration enter and exit the Maasai Mara National Reserve from the Serengeti National Park in Tanzania, making it one of the prime viewing locations for this wildlife spectacle. Crossings of the Mara River are world-renowned for being particularly dramatic, featuring in many wildlife documentaries such as Wild Africa and Big Cat Diary.

== Geography ==
The Mara Triangle is one third of the Maasai Mara National Reserve, with an area of 510 km^{2}. It has two natural borders and one political; to the southwest is the Tanzania/Serengeti border, to the east is the Mara River, and to the northwest is the Oldoinyio Escarpment (also called Oloololo or Siria Escarpment).

The landscapes of the Mara Triangle include riverine forest, red oat grasslands, volcanic hills and the 400-metre high Oloololo Escarpment.

== Tourism ==
The Mara Triangle is managed by the Mara Conservancy, under contract by the Trans-Mara county council, a local non profit organisation formed by the local Maasai people, and contains a number of anti-poaching units.

There are two permanent lodges inside the Mara Triangle - Mara Serena and Little Governors. There are a few camps on the park's periphery which offer game drives inside the park: Angama Mara, Bateleur Camp, Kichwa Tembo, Kilima Camp, Mara Engai Wilderness Lodge, Mara Siria Tented Camp & Cottages, and Mpata Safari Club.

It is also possible to take your own camping gear and stay at one of the public or private campsites and a number of seasonal mobile camps are set up to coincide with the arrival of the megaherds of the Great Migration each year.

The Mara Triangle is easy to access by plane with Angama Mara Airfield, Kichwa Tembo, Mara North, Musiara and Serena airstrips, and with daily scheduled flights connecting it with other parks and reserves in Kenya, the Kenyan coast (Mombasa, Diani, Malindi) and Nairobi (Jomo Kenyatta and Wilson airports). The Mara Triangle is also reachable by road.
