= William Ole Ntimama Stadium =

Stadium in Narok, Kenya

Coordinates: 1.0952°S 35.8696°E

William Ole Ntimama Stadium, formerly called Narok Stadium, is a 20,000 seat association football and multi-use stadium in Narok. It is currently the home field of Kariobangi Sharks F.C. and Sofapaka F.C. of the Kenyan Premier League, the top-flight of Kenyan football.

The Office of the Deputy Prime Minister of Kenya commissioned a renovation of the stadium in 2012 following a request by the local government. The stadium was renamed in 2020 after late politician William Ole Ntimama who died in 2016.

== Kenyan stadiums ==
The William Ole Ntimama Stadium is the second largest stadium by capacity in Kenya.

Stadium	City	Capacity
Moi International Sports Centre	Kasarani	80,000
William Ole Ntimama Stadium	Narok	20,000
Kinoru Stadium	Meru	15,000
Nyayo National Stadium	Nairobi	15,000
