= Devil Worship Commission =

Kenyan government commission

The Devil Worship Commission was a Kenyan Government Commission established on 20 October 1994 by President Daniel arap Moi. The commission was tasked to look into the matter of devil worship in Kenya.

== Membership ==
The Commission's membership included:

- Archbishop Nicodemus Kirima - Archbishop Nyeri Catholic diocese as Chairman
- Rev Bernard Muindi - Moderator Presbyterian Church of East Africa (PCEA)
- Bishop David Njue
- Fred Ojiambo
- Rev Jones Kaleli (Christian, African Inland Church)
- Cripole W. Ongoro
- Horrace Etemesi (Christian, Anglican Church of Kenya)
- Dr Philista Onyango
- Prof Jude Ongoga
- Josiah O Acme (Joint Secretary)
- Mrs. V W Maina (Joint secretary)

== Report ==
The commission presented its report to the President towards the end of 1995. President Moi said it would not be made public because it contained sensitive information. It was however released to the Kenyan Parliament in 1999 by the then Minister of Internal Security Julius Sunkuli.

The report concluded that devil worship was commonplace in Kenya and recommended establishing a special police force to investigate crimes of the occult. The Commission's report also included numerous reports of ritual murder, human sacrifice, cannibalism, and feats of magic allegedly done by using powers acquired through such acts. It also reported that "Satanists" had infiltrated non-indigenous religious groups and other organizations, making them "doorways" to Satanism. The Commission is no longer functioning, and the Government took no action to follow up on the report
