= AAAES =

Non-profitable, non-governmental educational organization

American Associations for Accreditation and Educational Services, also known as triple A ES or AAAES, is a non-profit, non-governmental organization that accredits and supports schools and colleges in the United States, middle east and Africa. AAAES was established in 2009 under the United States law by the state of Pennsylvania.

AAAES aims to acknowledge and support worldwide academic institutions, dedicated to teach students the necessary to achieve positions of influence and leadership in their future professions. The system of accreditation requires each educational institution to be accredited to use the AAAES reporting system and to sign that it may encounter visits from AAAES representatives any time of year under any reason.

By the end of 2013 AAAES published that they start working in Africa with Kenya as a start then the organization served international schools at Egypt form 2015.

The organization have headquarters at PA, United States and regional offices at Narok, Kenya and Cairo, Egypt.
