= Kilgoris Constituency =

Kenyan electoral constituency

Kilgoris Constituency is an electoral constituency in Narok County, Kenya. It is one of six constituencies in the county. It used to be the only constituency in the former Trans Mara District. The constituency was established for the 1997 elections. The constituency has 18 wards, all electing MCAs for the Narok County Assembly.

The towns of Kilgoris, Emarti and Lolgorian are located in this constituency.

== Members of Parliament ==
| Elections | MP | Party | Notes |
|---|---|---|---|
| 1997 | Julius L. Sunkuli | KANU | |
| 2002 | Gideon Sitelu Konchella | KANU | |
| 2008 | Gideon Sitelu Konchella | PNU | June 11, 2008 by-election |

2022 KENYA GENERAL ELECTION - KANU PARTY - JULIUS LEKAKENY SUNKULI

== Locations and wards ==
Locations
| Location | Population* |
| Ang'ata | 8,963 |
| Emarti | 22,239 |
| Emurua Dikirr | 8,299 |
| Enosaen | 4,886 |
| Esoit Naibor | 4,836 |
| Isampini | 3,143 |
| Kapune | 1,964 |
| Kimintet | 5,254 |
| Masurura | 3,828 |
| Megwara | 2,914 |
| Moita | 2,961 |
| Moyoi | 6,766 |
| Murkan | 22,150 |
| Njipship | 9,755 |
| Nkararo | 6,026 |
| Ntulele | 3,226 |
| Olalui | 3,525 |
| Oldonyo Orok | 6,194 |
| Oloiborsoit | 3,596 |
| Ololchani | 8,222 |
| Olorien | 8,394 |
| Ololmasani | 10,992 |
| Ololtare | 4,320 |
| Olomismis | 5,207 |
| Oltanki | 2,230 |
| Oronkai | 4,472 |
| Osinoni | 1,675 |
| Osupuko | 4,135 |
| Poroko | 4.130 |
| Shankoe | 4,067 |
| Shartuka | 3,102 |
| Sikawa | 5,241 |
| Sirua Aluo | 3,368 |
| Total | x |
1999 census.

Wards
| Ward | Registered Voters |
| Ang'ata Barrikoi | 4,173 |
| Emarti | 1,958 |
| Emurua Dikirr | 7,175 |
| Enoosaen | 2,353 |
| Kapune | 2,293 |
| Kimintet | 2,774 |
| Masurura | 988 |
| Moyoi | 2,428 |
| Murgan | 6,955 |
| Nkararo | 2,046 |
| Oloirien | 2,352 |
| Ololmasani | 6,686 |
| Olomismis | 2,706 |
| Osinoni | 1,880 |
| Poroko | 3,388 |
| Shankoe | 4,053 |
| Shartuka | 2,050 |
| Sikawa | 2,410 |
| Total | 58,668 |
*September 2005.
