= Tira (zebra) =

Individual polka dot zebra

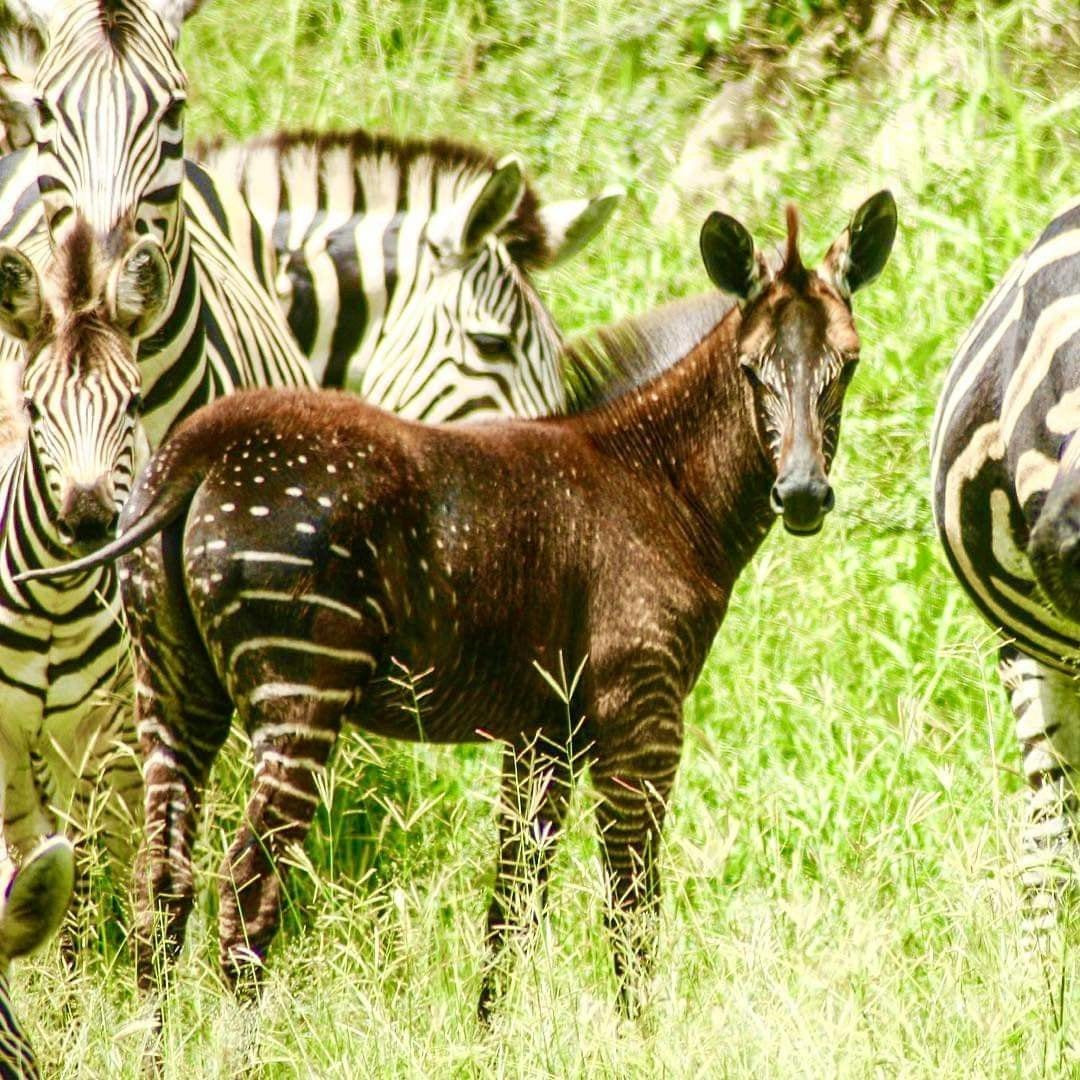
- Species: Plains zebra (Equus quagga)
- Sex: Male
- Born: 2019; Masai Mara National Reserve
- Known for: polka dot coat

Tira is the first polka dot zebra found in the Masai Mara National Reserve in Kenya. Similarly patterned zebra foals have been seen before in Botswana. Tira, a plains zebra (Equus quagga) who is mostly black, with white spots, was first discovered and named by a local guide named Anthony Tira.

The dotted color is a genetic condition popularly called pseudomelanism. One geneticist suggests "spotted" or "partially spotted" may be a better description as "pseudomelanism" is not well defined.

Zebras with unusual coat patterns, like Tira, may be part of a broader trend of genetic mutations affecting stripe formation. Researchers suggest that such variations could be linked to environmental factors or genetic changes, as observed in other spotted and oddly striped zebras.

The distinctive appearance of Tira has inspired cultural works, such as Angela Doyle's children's book, Zeke the Polka-Dotted Zebra, which explores themes of uniqueness and self-acceptance. As interest in uniquely patterned zebras like Tira grows, it is hoped that more literature and research will explore their genetic traits, conservation significance, and cultural impact.
