= Contents of the United States diplomatic cables leak (China) =

Content from the United States diplomatic cables leak has depicted People's Republic of China and related subjects extensively. The leak, which began on 28 November 2010, occurred when the website of WikiLeaks — an international new media non-profit organisation that publishes submissions of otherwise unavailable documents from anonymous news sources and news leaks — started to publish classified documents of detailed correspondence — diplomatic cables — between the United States Department of State and its diplomatic missions around the world. Since the initial release date, WikiLeaks is releasing further documents every day.

== China–North Korea relations ==
A Chinese official revealed that both public opinion in China and the government are "increasingly critical" of North Korea, stating that "China's influence with the North was frequently overestimated". The Chinese mentioned that they do not "like" North Korea, but "they are a neighbor".

== Cyberwarfare ==
The cables state that China is engaging in cyberwarfare to bolster offensive and defensive computer network operations capabilities. Their recruits include Lin Yong, using the alias Lion, who founded the Honker Union of China, a Chinese hacker group that emerged after the U.S. bombing of the Chinese embassy in Belgrade in 1999 and XFocus, the hacker group that released blaster worm in August 2003.

=== 2010 hacking incident ===
A Chinese contact told the U.S. Embassy in Beijing that the Politburo of the Chinese Communist Party was responsible for instigating the January 2010 Google hacking incident which was part of a wider "coordinated campaign of computer sabotage carried out by government operatives, private security experts and Internet outlaws recruited by the Chinese government" targeting the U.S. and its Western allies.

== Manas Air Base ==
In February 2009, the U.S. Ambassador to Kyrgyzstan spoke to her Chinese counterpart, Zhang Yannian, after being notified that China had offered Kyrgyzstan $3 billion in return for the closure of Manas Air Base — an important U.S. base in Bishkek handling flights into and out of Afghanistan. She stated that during the encounter "visibly flustered, Zhang temporarily lost the ability to speak Russian and began spluttering in Chinese". He responded with his own proposal to the U.S. on dealing with the Kyrgyz to keep the base open, during which his aide remarked: "Or maybe you should give them $5 billion and buy both us and the Russians out".

== Foreign policy ==
China's foreign policy has been criticized by a Western diplomat as "newly pugnacious", despite earlier policies assuring China's rise would be a "peaceful" one. Jon Huntsman, Jr., U.S. Ambassador to China, has stated that the recent policy shift is "losing friends worldwide". Huntsman discussed a British diplomat critical of conduct by Chinese officials at the Copenhagen climate change summit, who considered the change in China's approach "shocking". He mentions that "China's more aggressive approach" has caused India to strengthen their relationship with the United States. Japanese diplomats confirmed the new "aggressive" approach, and a Moroccan diplomat commented that "China will never play the role of a global leader if it treats its trade partners so poorly". However, Huntsman reminds that this does not imply that nations will turn toward the United States in response, and that many countries are equally suspicious of the Americans as they are of the Chinese. He quotes Julius Ole Sunkuli, who "claimed that Africa was better off thanks to China's practical, bilateral approach to development assistance and was concerned that this would be changed by 'western' interference… Sunkuli said Africans were frustrated by western insistence on capacity building, which translated, in his eyes, into conferences and seminars. They instead preferred China's focus on infrastructure and tangible projects."

== Economic interests in Africa ==
In a 2010 cable, the US Assistant Secretary for African Affairs downplays China as a military, security or intelligence threat, describing it instead as a 'very aggressive economic competitor with no morals'. The cable also highlights how 'the Chinese are dealing with the Mugabe's and Bashir's of the world, which is a contrarian political model'.

== GDP accuracy ==
The U.S. embassy memo sent on 15 March 2007 stated Li Keqiang, the Vice Premier of China, told China's GDP is not reliable, especially for local GDP, to the U.S. Ambassador Clark T. Randt, Jr. Li said GDP statistics are 'for reference only.'

== Tibet ==
According to diplomatic cables, the Dalai Lama told Timothy J. Roemer, U.S. Ambassador to India, in 2009 that the international community should focus on climate change rather than politics in Tibet because environmental problems were more urgent. "Melting glaciers, deforestation and increasingly polluted water from mining projects were problems that 'cannot wait', but the Tibetans could wait five to 10 years for a political solution", he was reported as saying in August 2009. He is also quoted in a cable, "Tibet is a dying nation. We need America's help."
