= Johana Ng'eno =

Kenyan politician (1972–2026)

Member of Parliament
- In office 28 March 2013 – 28 February 2026
- Preceded by: Constituency established
- Succeeded by: David Kipsang Keter
- Constituency: Emurua Dikirr

Personal details
- Born: Johana Ng'eno Kipyegon; 12 December 1972 Narok District, Rift Valley Province, Kenya
- Died: 28 February 2026 (aged 53) Chepkiep, Mosop, Nandi County, Kenya
- Cause of death: Helicopter crash
- Education: Taras Shevchenko National University of Kyiv (Bachelor of Arts in International Law); Maseno School

Johana Ng'eno Kipyegon (12 December 1972 – 28 February 2026) was a Kenyan politician and member of the Kenyan National Assembly.

== Early life ==
Ng'eno was born on 12 December 1972 in rural Narok County, Kenya, where access to education was limited but highly valued. He began schooling at Mogondo Primary School before joining Maseno National School for secondary education. He moved to Molo in 1994 during a famine. Ng'eno attended the Taras Shevchenko National University of Kyiv in Kyiv, Ukraine, earning a Bachelor of Arts in International Law. He returned to Kenya and got an LL.B from Mount Kenya University and a Master of Arts in International Studies from the University of Nairobi.

== Career ==
Ng'eno served as Director at the Agricultural Development Corporation (ADC) from 2008 to 2012. In September 2025, he became the bar as an Advocate of the High Court of Kenya. He served on several influential committees, including the Departmental Committee on Justice and Legal Affairs, the Public Investments Committee, and the National Government Constituencies Development Fund (NG-CDF) Committee.

== Personal life ==
Ng'eno provided school buses to multiple institutions and disbursing NG-CDF bursaries to students in need. In September 2020, he was arrested and charged in connection with his statements during protests related to Mau forest evictions and related disagreements. Authorities accused him of incitement. He was detained for about two days at the Nakuru Prison before being brought before a magistrate. The court granted him bond, requiring him to post Ksh2 million or alternatively Ksh1 million in cash, and ordered that he should refrain from making public comments that might incite violence or hatred. In early 2025, he purchased land and transferred title deeds to the family of the late Chumeek. On an interview in June 2025, Ng'eno said he was kidnapped inside a police station at night and was almost killed in a forest.

=== Death ===
At around 4:45 p.m. on 28 February 2026, a Eurocopter AS350 Écureuil helicopter carrying him and five others en route from Wilson Airport in Nairobi struck trees while flying at low altitude during bad weather in Chepkiep, Mosop, Nandi County. All six occupants were killed and the helicopter was destroyed by fire. The victims were identified as Ng'eno, Amos Kipngetich Rotich, an officer from the Kenya Forest Service, Nick Kosgey, Ng'eno's personal photographer, Wycliffe Kiprotich Rono, a protocol officer, Robert Kipkoech Keter, a teacher and George Were, the pilot. The bodies were burnt beyond recognition. They were transported to a funeral home in Nairobi on 1 March. Leaders, including president William Ruto and politician Martha Karua, mourned Ng'eno. The flight recorder and other critical equipment were recovered from the site. A preliminary report is expected to be released in 30 days.

== See also ==
- 2012 Kenya Police helicopter crash
