= Changing rainfall patterns since the 1970s in Rift Valley, Kenya =

Weather pattern changes in Africa

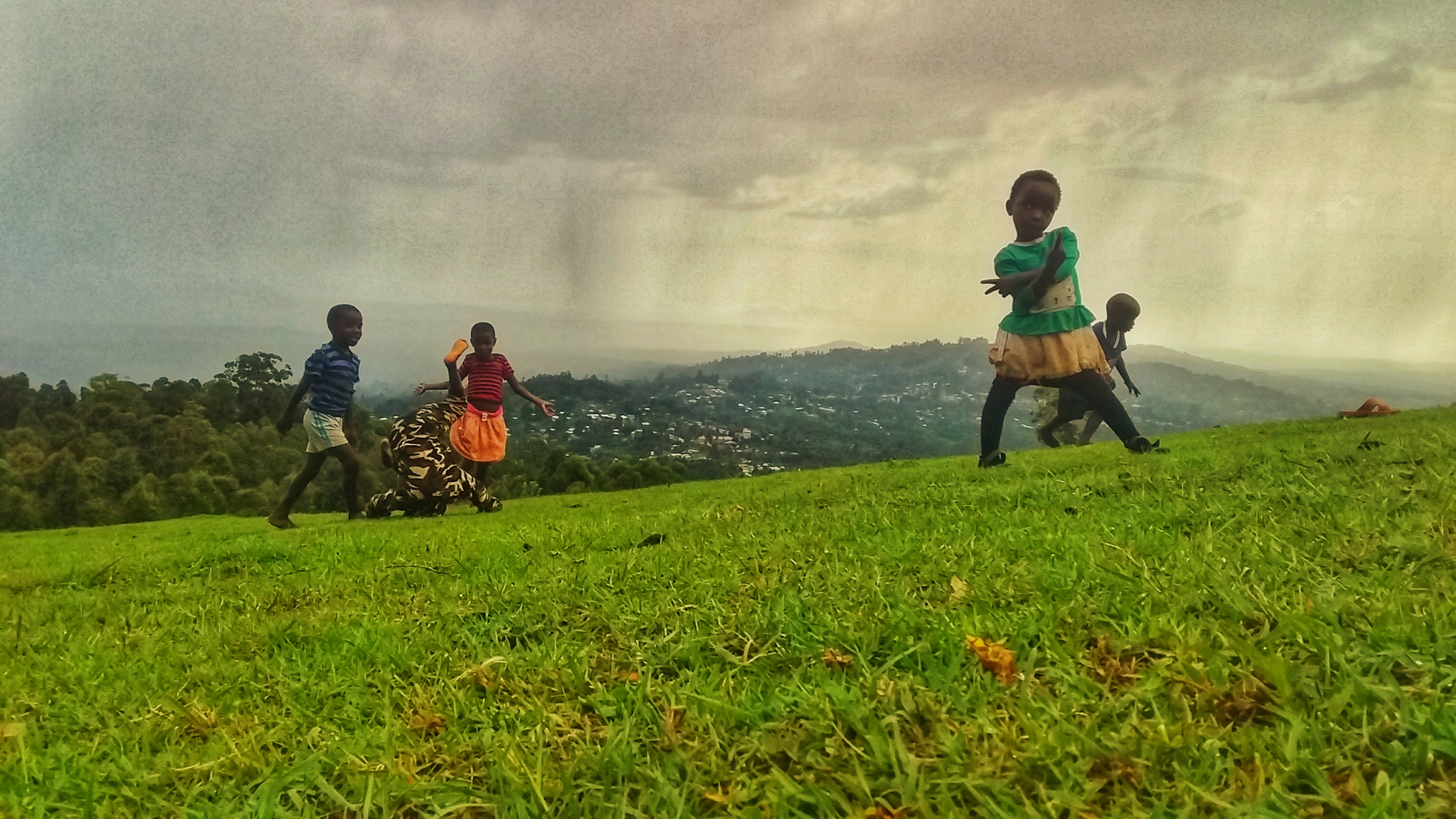
Children playing as rain approaches, Kenya

The rainfall patterns during the peak growing season of March, April and May have been changing over the past few decades in the province of Rift Valley, Kenya. Since the 1970s, rainfall during this season has increased in quantity but decreased in the number of days rained. This has resulted in an increase of rain intensity.

These changing rainfall patterns in this part of Kenya are a part of climate change resulting from increasing annual temperatures and warming sea surface temperatures in the southwest Indian Ocean. The increase in rain intensity has caused soil erosion and infertile land. The decrease in rain days resulted in a shorter growing season. These factors affect the socioeconomic lives of the people in Rift Valley as their income and food is largely dependent on agriculture and subsistence farming. Agricultural adaptations are being adopted by farmers living in Rift Valley to combat the decrease in crop yield due to changing rainfall patterns.

== Changing patterns of rainfall during peak season in Rift Valley ==
The rainfall patterns in Rift Valley, Kenya, have changed over the past few decades in quantity, number of days rained, and intensity. The rainfall patterns in Rift Valley are bimodal with their primary season occurring in March, April and May and a secondary one occurring in October, November and December. There is also a small tertiary rain season occurring in June, July and August.

A study was conducted to measure changing rainfall patterns during the peak growing seasons of March, April and May in Rift Valley between the years of 1976 and 2005. The study revealed that rainfall during the peak growing season had increased by 18mm. This increase was steady over the three decades as indicated in Table 1; however, the number of days rained decreased in this time period. The data illustrates this using the average number of days rained in March, April and May. Between 1976 and 1985, the average number of rain days was 29 days, decreasing to 26 days between 1996 and 2005. Increasing rainfall with fewer rain days indicates an increase in the intensity of rainfall. This was true for the months of April and May but March showed a decrease in rain intensity. In the years between 1976 and 1985, rainfall intensity was 7.7mm/h and increased to 10.2mm/h between the years of 1996 and 2005. In May, the rainfall intensity was 5.9mm/h in the years between 1976 and 1985 and increased to 8.4mm/h in the years between 1986 and 1995. March, however, did not follow the trend of increasing rainfall intensity showing little variation. There was a decrease in March's rainfall intensity from 6.5mm/h in the years of 1976 and 1985 to 7.4mm/h in the years of 1986 to 1995. The high rainfall in the primary rain season of March, April and May have led to suppressed rainfall in the secondary and tertiary rain seasons and a decline in the annual rainfall performance.

Decade	Rainfall in the months March, April and May measured in millimeters
1976-1985	214.1mm
1986-1995	224.4mm
1996-2005	232.1mm

== Cause of changes ==
Changing rainfall patterns in Rift Valley, Kenya, is a part of climate change. Due to climate change, rainfall in Rift Valley has become irregular and less predictable with rainfall being more intense and extreme. Over the 20th century, including the 1970s, 1980s and 1990s, East Africa, where Rift Valley is located, had undergone a 0.05 ◦C warming per decade. Changing temperatures are significant to changing rainfall patterns because high temperatures cause high rates of evaporation which leads to the high intensity of rainfall as seen in the Rift Valley.

Cyclones have also been found as a cause of Kenya's delayed rains. While it is normal for cyclones to occur between the months of February to March, their magnitude is dictated by sea temperatures, which are currently warming as a result of increased emission of greenhouse gases in the atmosphere, leading to global warming. This means the intensity and frequency of cyclones is likely to increase.

Future predictions claim climate change will cause a 5-20% increase in rainfall in the wet months and a 5-10% decrease in rainfall in the dry months of East Africa. Changes of rainfall patterns in Kenya have been attributed to climate change in relationship to the warming sea surface temperatures in the southwest Indian Ocean. It is noted that they were responsible for the droughts seen in Eastern Africa during the 1980s to the 2000s and contribute to changes in average rainfall. Climate change, leading to the changes in rainfall patterns, is a man-made phenomenon.

Human activities including: poor land use like owning large quantities of animals that exceed the carrying capacity of the land; unsustainable farming practices such as over cultivating the land and deforestation; are big contributing factors to climate change and changing rainfall patterns in western Kenya, where Rift Valley is located.

== Effects on agriculture and substance farming ==
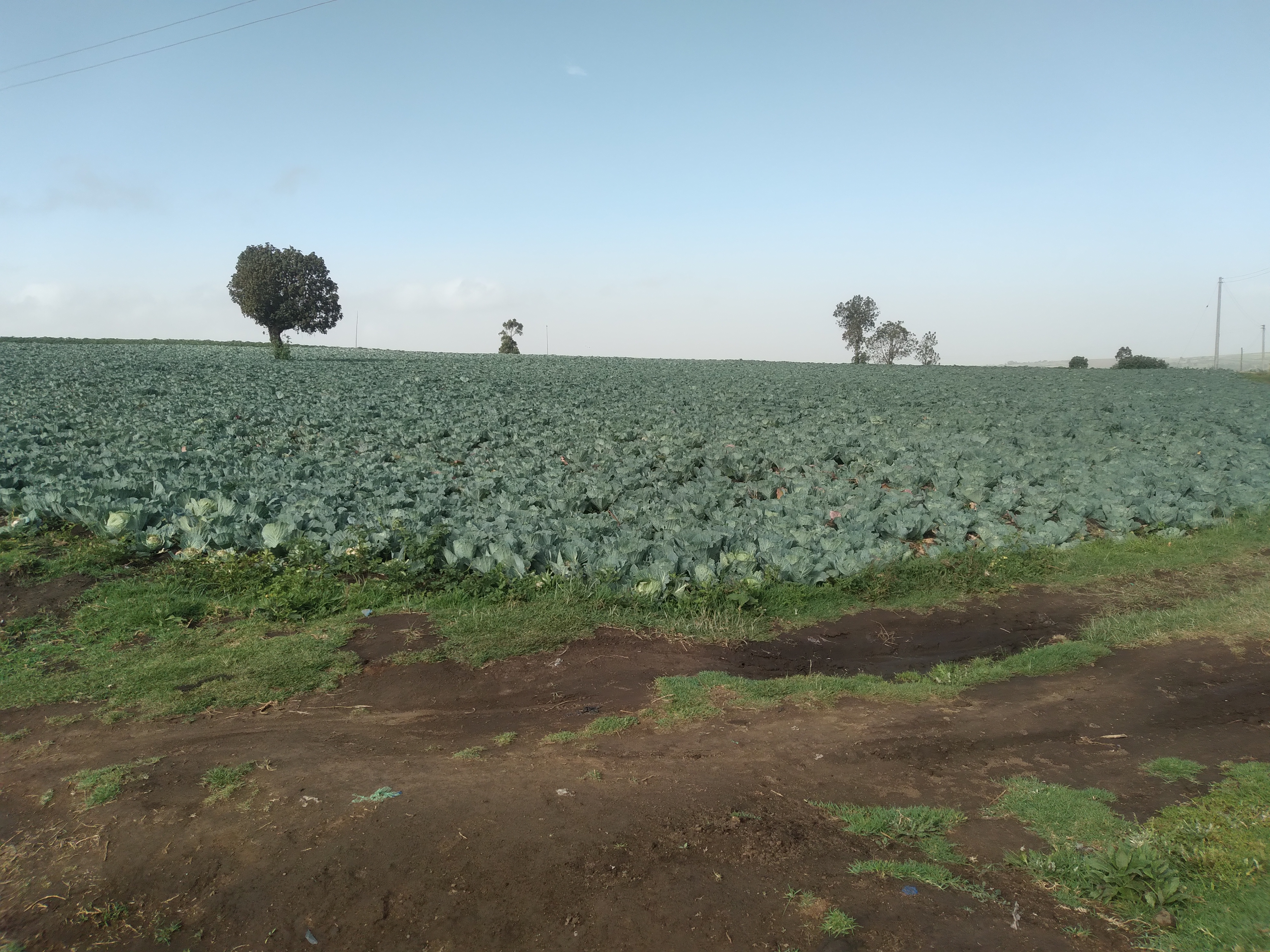
Cabbage farming in Narok, Kenya

The people of Rift Valley largely depend on agriculture and substance farming to provide food and to take part in the country's economy. Substance farming in Rift Valley is completely reliant on rainfall performance. Sixty percent of Kenya's socioeconomic activities depend on rainfall performance. Agriculture supports 75% of the population and accounts for all of the countries food requirements. If rainfall patterns vary too much, it could destroy essential agriculture and substance farming, devastating the societal and economic assets of Rift Valley. Short and long term changes in rainfall patterns have important effects on crop and

. Between 1976 and 2005, rainfall conditions in Rift Valley were good for substance farming; however, crop yield was poor due to the change in rainfall patterns with an increase in rain intensity and a decrease in rain days. The increasing intensity of rainfall during the growing season led to storms and flooding which: destroyed crop leaves, washed away top soil, and caused soil erosion, leaving the land infertile. The decrease in rain days during the peak growing season of March, April and May, indicates a shortening growing season with an estimated decrease of three weeks in 2005 compared to 1976. The shorter growing season led to farmers planting different varieties of maize to better suit the new growing conditions. The new maize varieties had a smaller yield when compared to the varieties that had been previously used, negatively affecting crop yield. The increasing rainfall variability makes it difficult for farmers to plan agricultural events such as weeding and harvesting. The changes in rainfall patterns brought negative effects on crop yield with ineffective rainfall shortening the growing season. Fewer rain days and increasing rain intensity led to farmers planting later in the season, altering the farming calendar, and leading to a decrease in crop yield. Overall, the changing rainfall patterns in Rift Valley have had a negative effect on agriculture and substance farming.

== Agricultural adaptations to changing rainfall patterns ==
Agricultural adaptations regarding changing rainfall patterns in Rift Valley focus on two issues: soil moisture replenishment to combat the decreasing number of rain days, and decreasing soil erosion caused by high intensity rains.

Soil moisture replenishment is done via water management adaptions. This optimizes rainfall by harnessing or channeling rainwater through interventions like terracing or infiltration ditches. Rainwater runoff is collected to reduce soil erosion. The most common adaptation for this is done by catching rainwater on a roof and collecting the runoff in a tank. This is called roof harvesting and reduces the flow of rainwater runoff on the land therefore reducing erosion (Recha et al., 2016). Other adaptations for reducing soil erosion and increasing soil fertility include agroforestry. After planting trees on their farms, 43% of substance farmers in western Kenya noticed improved farm productivity.
