= Enangiperi =

- Location within Kenya
- Coordinates: 0.68°S 35.9°E
- Country: Kenya
- Province: Rift Valley Province
- Elevation: 2,626 m (8,615 ft)
- Time zone: UTC+3 (EAT)

Enangiperi is a settlement in Kenya's Rift Valley Province.

It is located in Narok County, by highway C57. It is 1.5 km away from Nakuru County. Enangiperi is a small rural village, with large areas of farming. The roads are unpaved.

Enengeetia Primary School is located right outside of Enangiperi, likely serving children of the surrounding villages as well.
