= Nairagie Ngare =

Nairagie Enkare
- Location within Kenya
- Coordinates: 1.05°S 36.17°E
- Country: Kenya
- County: Narok County
- Time zone: UTC+3 (EAT)

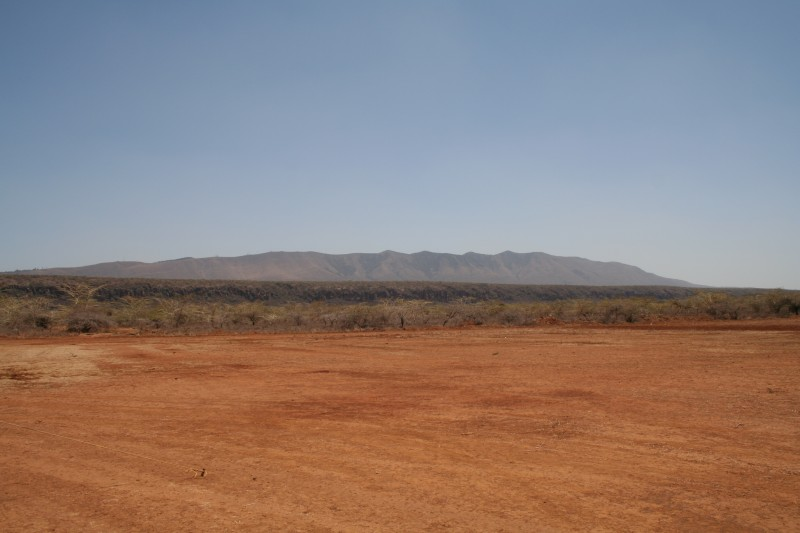
Rift Valley

Nairagie Ngare is a small town in Kenya's Narok County.

== Ethnicity ==
The people of the Rift Valley are a mesh work of different tribal identities, and the Kalenjin and the Maasai are two of the best known ethnic groups. Most of Kenya's top runners comes from the Kalenjin community. The Maasai people have the most recognizable cultural identity, both nationally and internationally, and serve as Kenya's international cultural symbol.
