= Narok East Constituency =

Electoral constituency in Kenya

Narok East
- constituency for the Parliament of Kenya
- Narok East Constituency within Narok County

- Narok County within Kenya
- County: Narok
- Population: 115,323
- Area: 2,042 km^{2} (788.4 sq mi)

Current constituency
- Number of members: 1
- Party: UDA
- Member of Parliament: Lemanken Aramat
- Wards: 4

Narok East is an electoral constituency in Kenya. It is one of six constituencies of Narok County. The constituency was established for the 2013 elections. Since the 2013 Kenyan General Elections, Hon. Lemanken Aramat has represented the constituency in the Kenyan National Assembly. In 2017, Aramat won re-election as a member of the Jubilee Party.
