= Lemek =

- Location within Kenya
- Coordinates: 1.1°S 35.38°E
- Country: Kenya
- County: Narok County
- Time zone: UTC+3 (EAT)

Lemek is a settlement in Kenya's Narok County.
