= Ntuka =

- Location within Kenya
- Coordinates: 1.33°S 35.9°E
- Country: Kenya
- County: Narok County
- Time zone: UTC+3 (EAT)

Ntuka is a settlement in Kenya's Narok County.
