= Narok West Constituency =

Electoral constituency of Kenya

Narok West
- constituency for the Parliament of Kenya
- Narok West Constituency within Narok County

- Narok County within Kenya
- County: Narok
- Population: 195,287
- Area: 5,563 km^{2} (2,147.9 sq mi)

Current constituency
- Number of members: 1
- Party: UDA
- Member of Parliament: Gabriel Koshal Tongoyo
- Wards: 4

Narok West is a constituency in Kenya. It is one of six constituencies in Narok County.

Some of the country assembly wards in Narok West constituency include;

- Siana Ward
- Mara Ward
- Ilmotiok Ward
- Naikarra ward
