= Angama Mara =

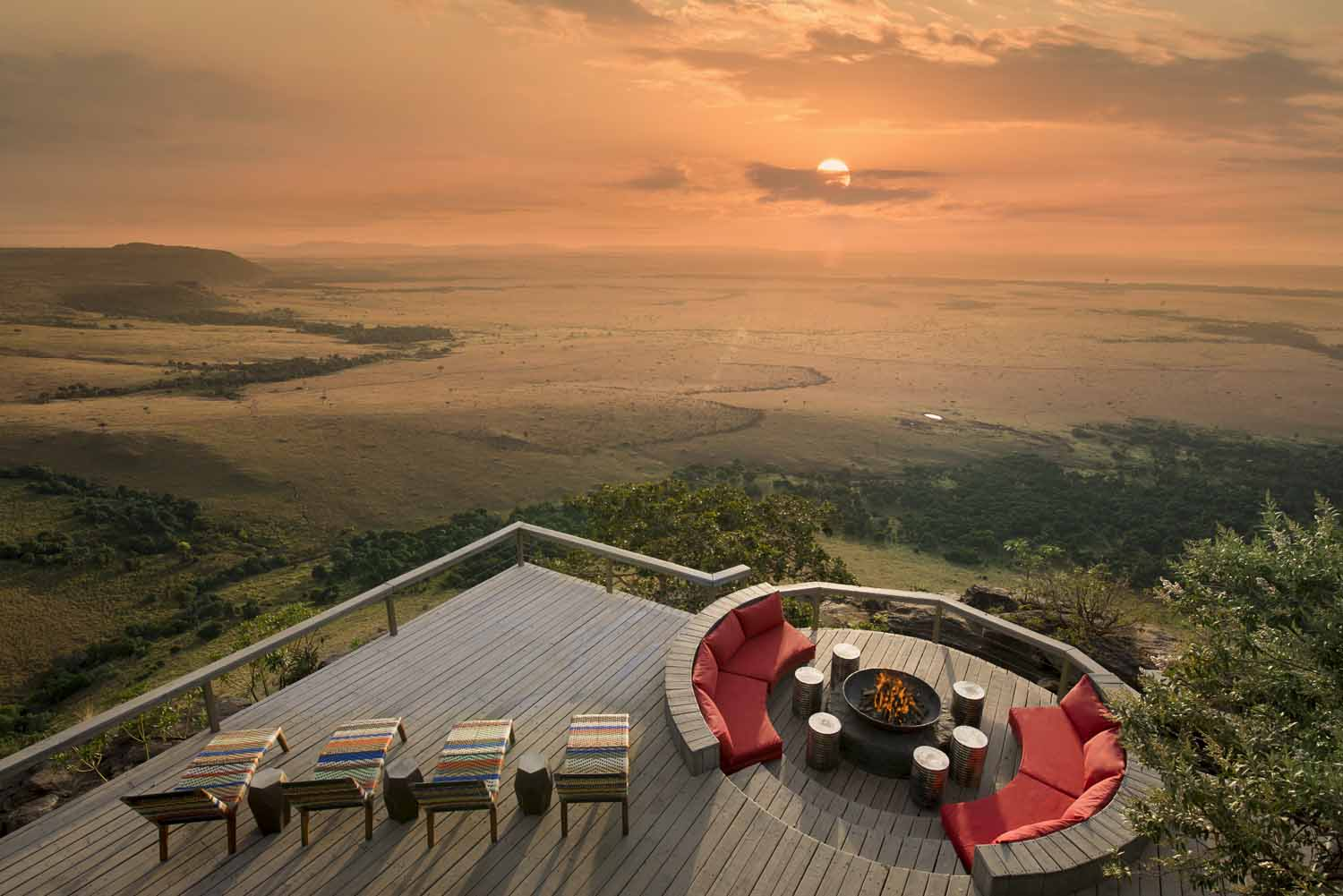
The view from the deck at Angama Mara

Angama Mara is a safari lodge in the Maasai Mara in Kenya.

== Etymology ==
In the Kiswahili language, "angama" means "suspended in mid-air"; the name refers to the lodge's location 300 metres (980 ft) above the floor of the Maasai Mara.

== History ==
The lodge was developed by Steve and Nicky Fitzgerald and opened in June 2015. It is located on the site where several scenes of Sydney Pollack's Out of Africa (1985) were filmed. It was chosen for the film as the landscape reflected what the Ngong Hills just outside Nairobi would have looked like in Karen Blixen's time, before the area became urbanised.

== Accommodation ==
Angama Mara comprises two separate camps of 15 tents each.

In 2020, Angama Safari Camp opened.

== Wildlife ==
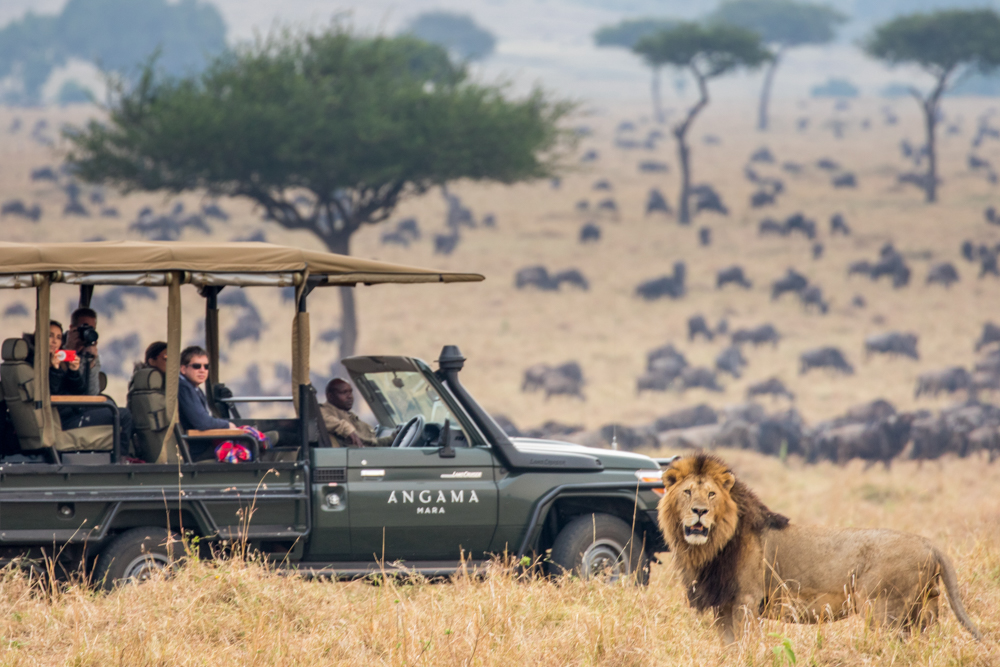
Male lion with the Great Migration in the background

Angama Mara has a private entrance to the 512 square kilometres (198 sq mi) Mara Triangle where all game drives take place. The Mara Triangle has abundant year-round wildlife, including the Big Five. It is also where the Great Migration enters and exits the Maasai Mara National Reserve and crosses the Mara River.

== Angama Foundation ==
The Angama Foundation supports education, healthcare, and conservative initiatives.

The Angama Foundation works closely with neighbouring schools and several conservation organisations including the Mara Conservancy, the Mara Elephant Project and the Anne K. Taylor Fund.

== Accolades ==
In 2018, Angama Mara was listed in Condé Nast Traveler as the #1 resort in Africa. It has also received other accolades including being featured in the Travel + Leisure World's Best Awards in 2020 and Fodor's Finest Hotels in 2020.
