= Iminuet =

- Location within Kenya
- Coordinates: 0.85°S 35.48°E
- Country: Kenya
- County: Narok County
- Time zone: UTC+3 (EAT)

Iminuet is a settlement in Kenya's Narok County.
