= Ol Mesuti =

- Country: Kenya
- County: Narok County
- Time zone: UTC+3 (EAT)

Ol Mesuti is a settlement in Kenya's Narok County.
