= Lolgorien =

Lolgorian
- Location within Kenya
- Coordinates: 1.23°S 34.8°E
- Country: Kenya
- County: Narok County
- Time zone: UTC+3 (EAT)

Lolgorian is a subcounty in Kenya's Narok County.

== Geography ==
Lolgorian is located on the Great Rift Valley in the western part of Kenya, approximately 223km from the capital Nairobi.

The vegetation consists of grass lands and moderate to thick forests, due to the moderate rainfall.
