= Noolpopong =

- Location within Kenya
- Coordinates: 1.17°S 36.05°E
- Country: Kenya
- County: Narok County
- Time zone: UTC+3 (EAT)

Noolpopong is a settlement in Kenya's Narok County.
