= Emurua Dikirr Constituency =

Kenyan electoral constituency

Emurua Dikirr is the smallest of six constituencies in Narok County, Kenya. The constituency was established for the 2013 elections.

== Leadership ==
Since the 2013 Kenyan General Elections, Johana Kipyegon Ngeno represented the constituency in the Kenyan National Assembly, first as a Kenya National Congress (KNC) member. Ngeno was re-elected in 2017 as a coalition member of The Eagle Coalition and served as Member of Parliament through 2026 after his 2022 reelection on a United Democratic Alliance ticket. Johana Ng'eno died in a helicopter crash on 28 February 2026.

It has 44,447 registered voters and 94 polling stations as of March 2026.

=== By-election ===
The by-election for its next Member of Parliament took place on 14 May 2026 after Ng'eno's death. Business man David Kipsang Keter won the United Democratic Alliance (UDA)'s nomination in March 2026, narrowly surpassing the late MP's assistant, Bernard Kipkoech Ng’eno in votes cast. He went on to win the by-election with 18,266 votes compared to his main rival, Vincent Kibet Rotich of the Democracy for the Citizens Party (DCP) who had 10,760 votes.

== Economy ==
Its backbone is the growing of sweet potatoes.

== Composition by population ==
As per the 2019 census, it had a population of 111,183 people. The constituency has 95% Christians and 2% Muslims (most of them living in Chebaibai near Murkan). It is located in Narok county and is famously known as Transmara East. The area is predominantly inhabited by the Kipsigis community.

== Wards ==
The constituency is divided into four wards: Ilkerin Ward, Ololmasani Ward, Mogondo Ward and Kapsasian Ward.

Wards
Ward	Registered Voters	Local Authority
Ilkerin	13,678	Narok County
Ololmasani	12,652	Narok County
Mogondo	8,087	Narok County
Kapsasian	10,030	Narok County
Total	44,447	
Source :2022 general election (IEBC official final register).
