= Emarti =

- Town
- Country: Kenya
- County: Narok
- Division: Kirindoni
- Near: Kilgoris

Population
  - Total: 18,300 (1,999 census)

Emarti is a town in Narok County, Kenya. The town is located in Kirindoni division, near Kilgoris. Emarti has a population of 18.300 (1999 census, total population of the Emarti location).

The original people are the Kipsigis and a Maasai clan called Siria.
