= Entasekera =

- Location within Kenya
- Coordinates: 1.85°S 35.85°E
- Country: Kenya
- County: Narok County
- Time zone: UTC+3 (EAT)

Entasekera is a settlement in Kenya's Narok County.

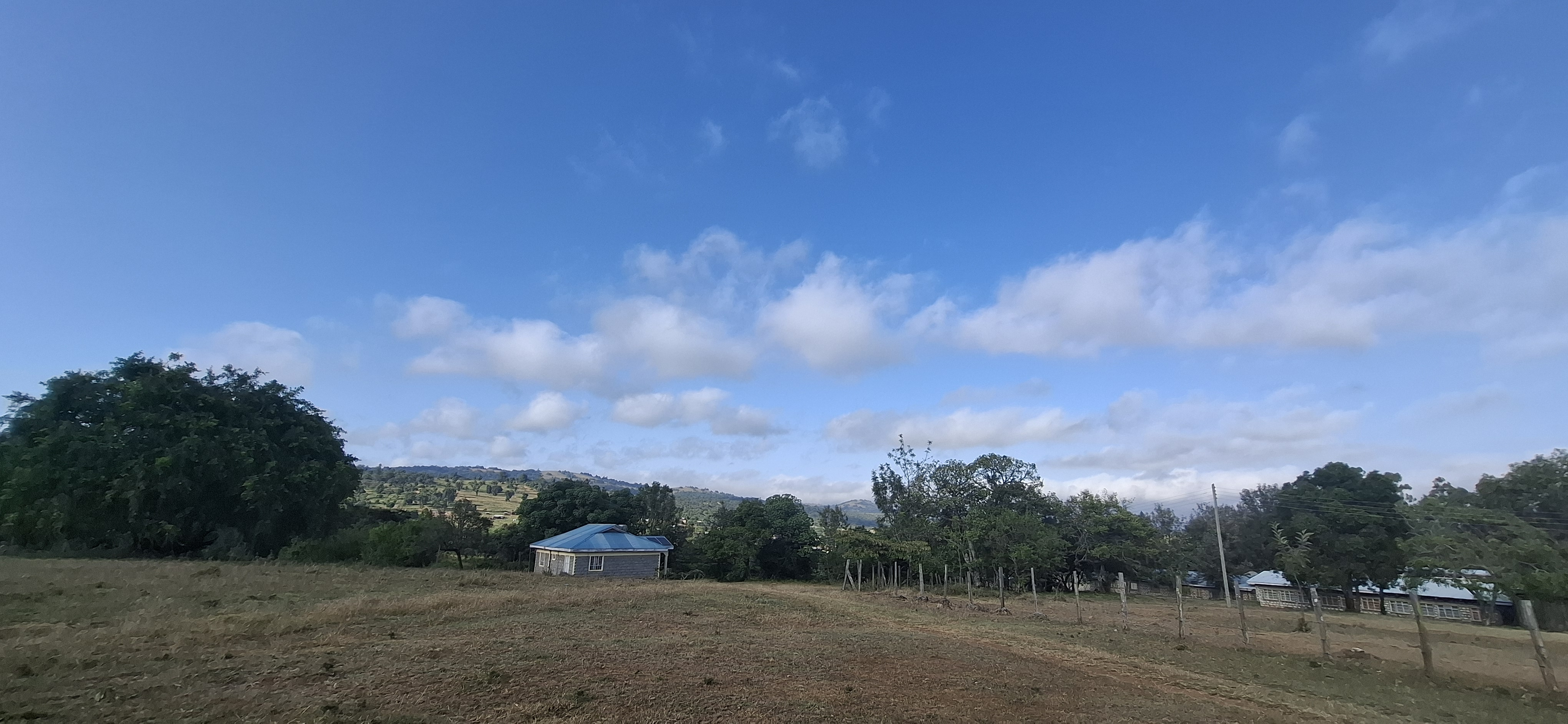
Loita Community Health & Education Centre-Entasekera
