= Olchorro =

- Location within Kenya
- Coordinates: 0.88°S 36.02°E
- Country: Kenya
- County: Narok County

Population (2019)
  - Total: 7,150
- Time zone: UTC+3 (EAT)

Olchorro is a populated place in Kenya's Narok County.
