= Maji Moto =

- Location within Kenya
- Coordinates: 1.33°S 35.72°E
- Country: Kenya
- County: Narok County
- Time zone: UTC+3 (EAT)

Maji Moto is a settlement in Kenya's Narok County.

There is another settlement with the same name (sometimes "Maji Ya Moto") in Baringo County, Kenya.

== Economy ==
=== Tourism ===
Tourism plays a modest role in the local economy. The area features a small tourist camp, which serves as a base for visitors interested in cultural experiences, wildlife, and nearby natural attractions.
