= Masandare =

- Location within Kenya
- Coordinates: 0.97°S 35.6°E
- Country: Kenya
- County: Narok County
- Time zone: UTC+3 (EAT)

Masandare is a settlement in Kenya's Narok County.
