= William Ole Ntimama =

Kenyan politician (1928–2916)

William Ronkorua Ole Ntimama (February 1928 – September 1, 2016) was a Kenyan politician. He was a staunch supporter of the ruling party KANU, prior to the adoption of the multiparty politics in Kenya in 1990. Ole Ntimama was vocal against multi party politics like many diehard Kanu supporters around that time. However, after the advent of multipartism, he decamped from KANU and joined the Democratic Party (DP), then headed by retired President Mwai Kibaki. Ole Ntimama later joined the Orange Democratic Movement ODM during the 2007 general elections. He remained in ODM (Orange Democratic Movement) and was elected to represent the Narok North Constituency in the National Assembly of Kenya since the 2007 Kenyan parliamentary election.

Retirement from politics

He announced to retire from politics on September 14, 2013. He died on September 1, 2016.

Final farewell and political inclination Ole Ntimama announced that he had joined the Jubilee Party headed by President Uhuru Kenyatta on 12 August 2016 where he led a delegation to state house. Later on he welcomed President Uhuru Kenya to what has now been seen as a farewell meeting. During the event held on 14 August 2016, he led a declaration by the maasai community to rejoin the Jubilee Coalition.
