= Maasai Mara conservancies =

Areas converted to tourism-oriented wildlife conservancies

To the east and north of the Maasai Mara National Reserve, some of the former Maasai cattle-grazing areas have been converted into wildlife conservancies for tourism.

The conservancies include Enonkishu, Lemek, Mara Naboisho, Mara North, Nashulai, Olare Motorogi, Olarro North and Olarro South, Olchorro Oirowua, Ol Kinyei, Olderkesi, Oloisukut, Pardamat and Siana.

The conservancies came about when Maasai land owners with neighbouring land came together to agree that safari camp operators could use their land for tourism purposes, in return for either a percentage of profits or leasing fee.

While this varies between conservancies, in some instances the Maasai retain livestock grazing rights in . Due to this, it is fairly common to see cattle alongside wildlife in certain areas.

== Tourism ==
Most of the conservancies have only a few lodges with strict limitations on the number of tourist beds and number of safari vehicles permitted at wildlife sightings. Self-driving is not permitted in any of the conservancies. Activities include night drives, off-road driving and walking safaris - which are not permitted in the Maasai Mara National Reserve.

== Human-wildlife Conflict ==
There are reports of increasing tensions between the Maasai pastoralists and tourism operators, with cattle moving into areas where grazing had been prohibited. Growing distrust between the Maasai communities and conservancy management companies is due to allegation that the original owners are being left out of the decision-making process and not receiving their fair share of the profits.
