= Julius Lekakeny Sunkuli =

Kenyan politician

Member of Parliament for Kilgoris Constituency
- In office 8 August 2022 – Incumbent

Member of Parliament for Kilgoris Constituency
- In office 1992–2002

Minister of Internal Security

Kenya’s Envoy to China

Personal details
- Born: Kenya
- Education: University of Nairobi (LLB)
- Alma mater: University of Nairobi
- Occupation: Politician, Lawyer

Julius Lekakeny Sunkuli is a Kenyan politician. He is currently a member of parliament in the National Assembly Representing Kilgoris constituency having been elected back on 8 August 2022. He previously represented the Kilgoris Constituency in the National Assembly of Kenya in between 1992 and 2002. He went to Kilgoris Secondary school between 1978 and 1981 where he later joined University of Nairobi where he studied LLB. He went to kericho law court and served as a judge before joining politics in 1992. He was Minister of State for Defence from 2000 to 2003. He was recently Kenya's envoy to China, prior to resigning to the Narok County senator's seat in the 2013 general election

In August 2022, the former internal security minister Julius Sunkuli has made a comeback to elective politics as Kilgoris MP-elect after 20 years outside Parliament.

== Rape Allegations ==
In 1999, two schoolgirls claimed they had been raped by Mr Sunkuli, who was then a cabinet minister in the government of Daniel Arap Moi . Sunkuli is alleged to have offered money for an abortion, but the girl, a fourteen-year-old named Florence, decided to keep her baby. A catholic priest John Anthony Kaiser put the girls in touch with the Kenyan Federation of Women Lawyers, FIDA-Kenya. The attorneys submitted the evidence to the government, but Sunkuli was never charged. Instead, police stormed the building where the girls were hiding.
