= Narok =

- Town
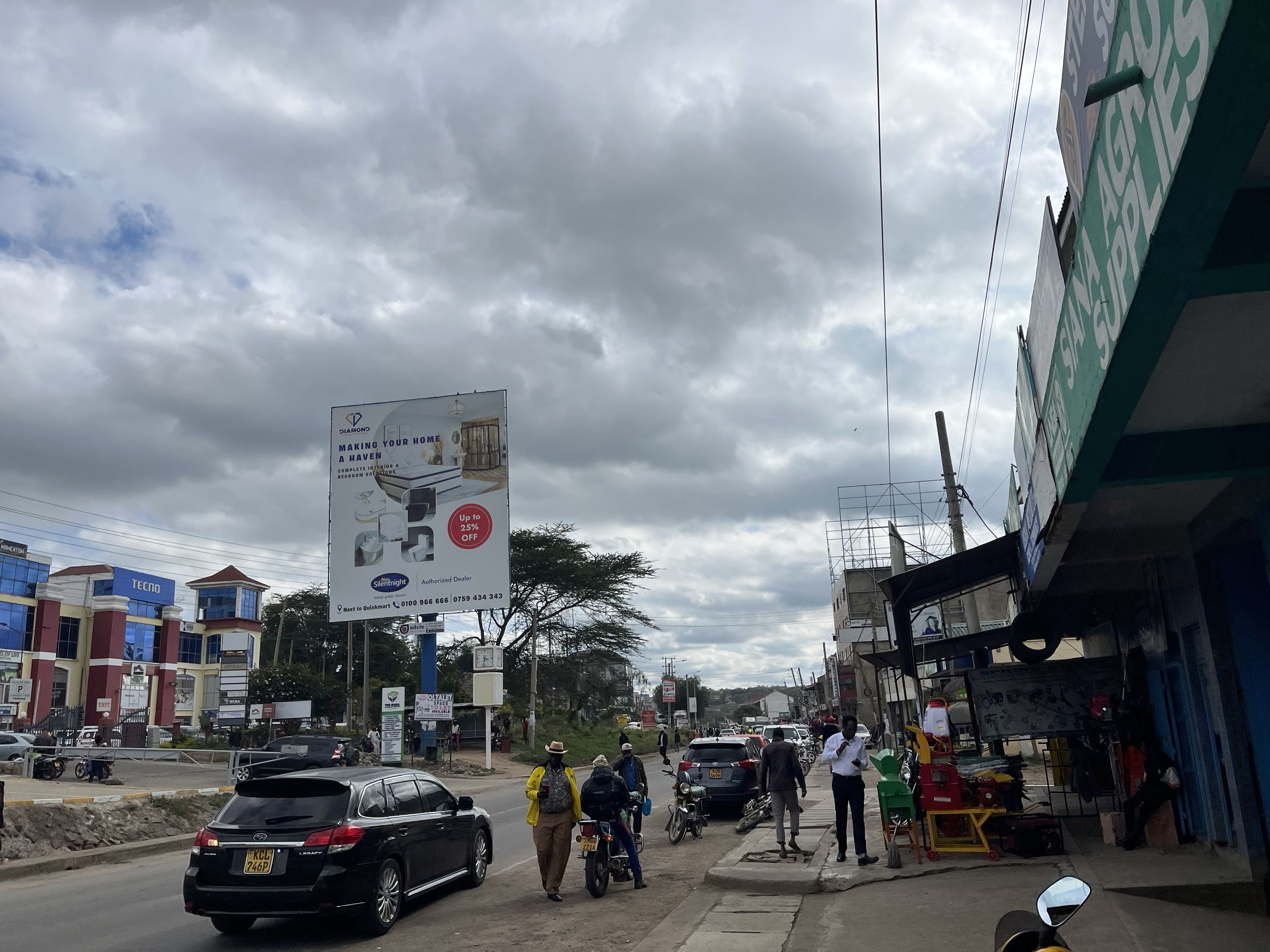

- Location within Kenya
- Coordinates: 01°05′S 35°52′E
- Country: Kenya
- County: Narok County

Population (2019 census)
  - Total: 65,430

Narok (sometimes referred to as Enkare Narok) is a town west of Nairobi that supports Kenya's economy in south-west of the country, along the Great Rift Valley. Narok is the county capital of the Narok County and stands as the major centre of commerce in the county. Narok has a population of around 117, 607 people according to 2019 Census, mostly Maasai. As at 2025, this town has been undergoing quite a significant growth and development and increase in population as well. The elevation of Narok is 1827 metres (5,997 feet) in altitude.

Narok Town is the last major town when travelling by road from Nairobi to Maasai Mara National Park and Keekorok Lodge. Narok Town stands as a centre for services, business, and finance. For decades, Narok's economy has benefited from tourism, agriculture, livestock keeping and mining. The 30,000-capacity William Ole Ntimama Stadium, a football stadium, is located in Narok Town.

== Education ==
Narok Town has several public and private primary and secondary schools.

=== Public Primary Schools ===
- Masikonde Primary School
- Ole Sankale Boarding School
- St. Mary's Primary School
- St. Peter's Primary
- Lenana Primary School
- Ilmashariani Primary School
- Pulunga Primary School

Private Primary Schools:

- St. Peters Academy
- Narok County Academy
- Ongata School
- Nasaruni Academy for Maasai Girls

=== Public Secondary Schools ===
- Narok Boys' High School.
- Maasai Girls' High School.
- Ole Tipis Secondary School
- St Mary's Secondary School.

Private Secondary Schools:

- St. Stephen Nkoitoi Secondary School
- Limanet Secondary School

=== Colleges ===
- Narok Teachers Training College
- Narok West Technical Training Institute
- Ludepe Teachers College
- Lusaka Institute of Science and Technology
- Narok West Institute of Professional Studies
- WE College

=== Universities ===
- Maasai Mara University

=== Religious studies ===
- Bible College, Bisset Bible College

== Economy ==
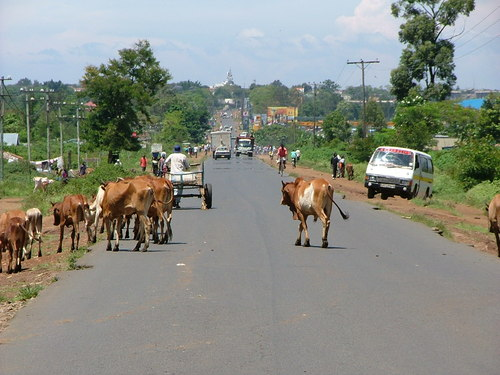
Cattle in Narok

The town has seen structural and economic growth as the roads and new construction in the area.

The Narok Stadium (now named William Ole Ntimama Stadium) has been upgraded by the County Government and National Government. Narok is home to the Kenyan football club, WAZITO FC.

The main economic income is the tourism sector, which brings an estimated 10 billion Kenya Shillings annually, as well as wheat farming, which is done both in large and small scale.

== Notable people ==
- Kurito Ole Kisio - Mau Mau general killed in 1954
- Lilian Seenoi-Barr - Mayor of Derry City and Strabane in Northern Ireland
