= Maasai Mara =

National Reserve in Narok County, Kenya

Maasai Mara National Reserve
- Swahili: Hifadhi ya Masai Mara
- Typical "spotted" Maasai Mara scenery

- Location within Kenya Location within Africa
- Location: Kenya, Narok County
- Nearest town: Narok
- Coordinates: 1°29′24″S 35°8′24″E
- Area: 1,510 km^{2} (580 sq mi)
- Established: 1961; 65 years ago
- Governing body: Narok County, Mara Conservancy LTD

Maasai Mara, sometimes also spelt Masai Mara and locally known simply as the Mara, is a large national game reserve in Narok County, Kenya, contiguous with the Serengeti National Park in Tanzania. It is named in honour of the Maasai people, the ancestral inhabitants of the area, who migrated to the area from the Nile Basin. Their description of the area when looked at from afar: "Mara" means "spotted" in the Maa language because of the short bushy trees which dot the landscape.

Maasai Mara is one of the wildlife conservation and wilderness areas in Africa, with its populations of lions, leopards, cheetahs and African bush elephants. It also hosts the great migration, which secured it as one of the Seven Natural Wonders of Africa, and as one of the ten Wonders of the World.

The great migration usually happens in July depending on weather as the wildebeest moves in large numbers crossing the Mara River from Tanzania.

The Greater Mara ecosystem encompasses areas known as the Maasai Mara National Reserve, the Mara Triangle, several Maasai group ranches, and Maasai Mara conservancies.

== History ==
When Maasai Mara was originally established in 1961 as a wildlife sanctuary, it covered only 520 km^{2} (200 sq mi) of the current area, including the Mara Triangle. The area was extended to the east in 1961 to cover 1,821 km^{2} (703 sq mi) and converted to a Game Reserve. The Narok County Council took over management of the reserve at this time. Part of the reserve was given National Reserve status in 1974, and the remaining area of 159km² was returned to local communities. An additional 162 km^{2} (63 sq mi) were removed from the reserve in 1976, and the park was reduced to 1,510 km^{2} (580 sq mi) in 1984.

The Maasai people make up a community that spans northern, central and southern Kenya and northern parts of Tanzania. The Maasai rely on their lands to sustain their cattle, as well as themselves and their families. Before the reserve's establishment, the Maasai were forced to move out of their native lands. Some of this was due to smallpox outbreaks among the people as well as rinderpest outbreaks among the cattle.

Tradition continues to play a major role in the lives of modern-day Maasai people, who are known for their tall stature, patterned shukas and beadwork. In 2008, an estimated half a million individuals spoke the Maa language. This number includes not only the Maasai but also Samburu and Ilchamus people in Kenya.

During the COVID-19-related downturn in tourism, Conservation International Kenya and partners established the Maasai Mara Rescue Fund to help wildlife conservancies cover lease payments to landowners and reduce pressure for land conversion.

== Geography ==
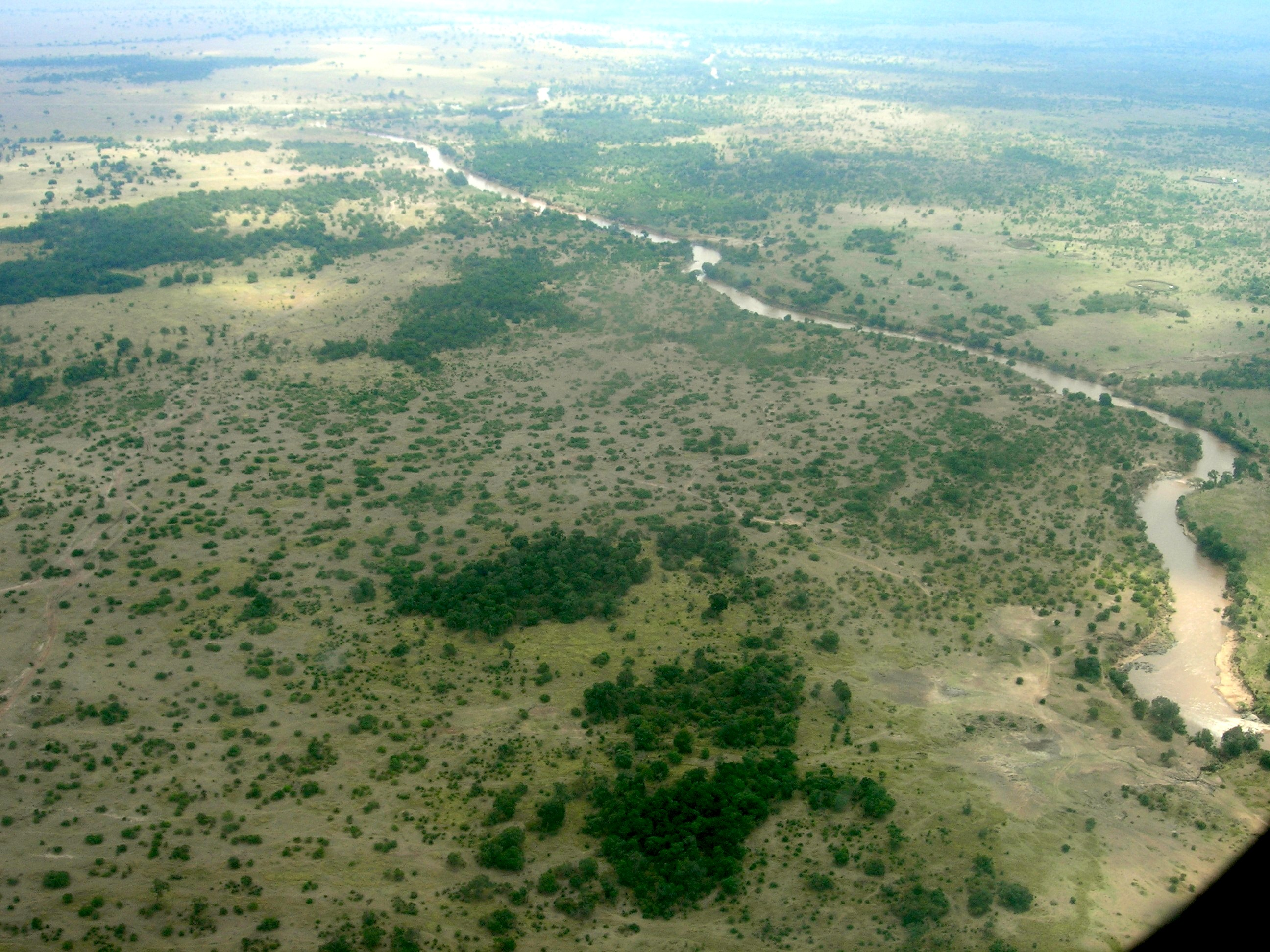
View of Mara River

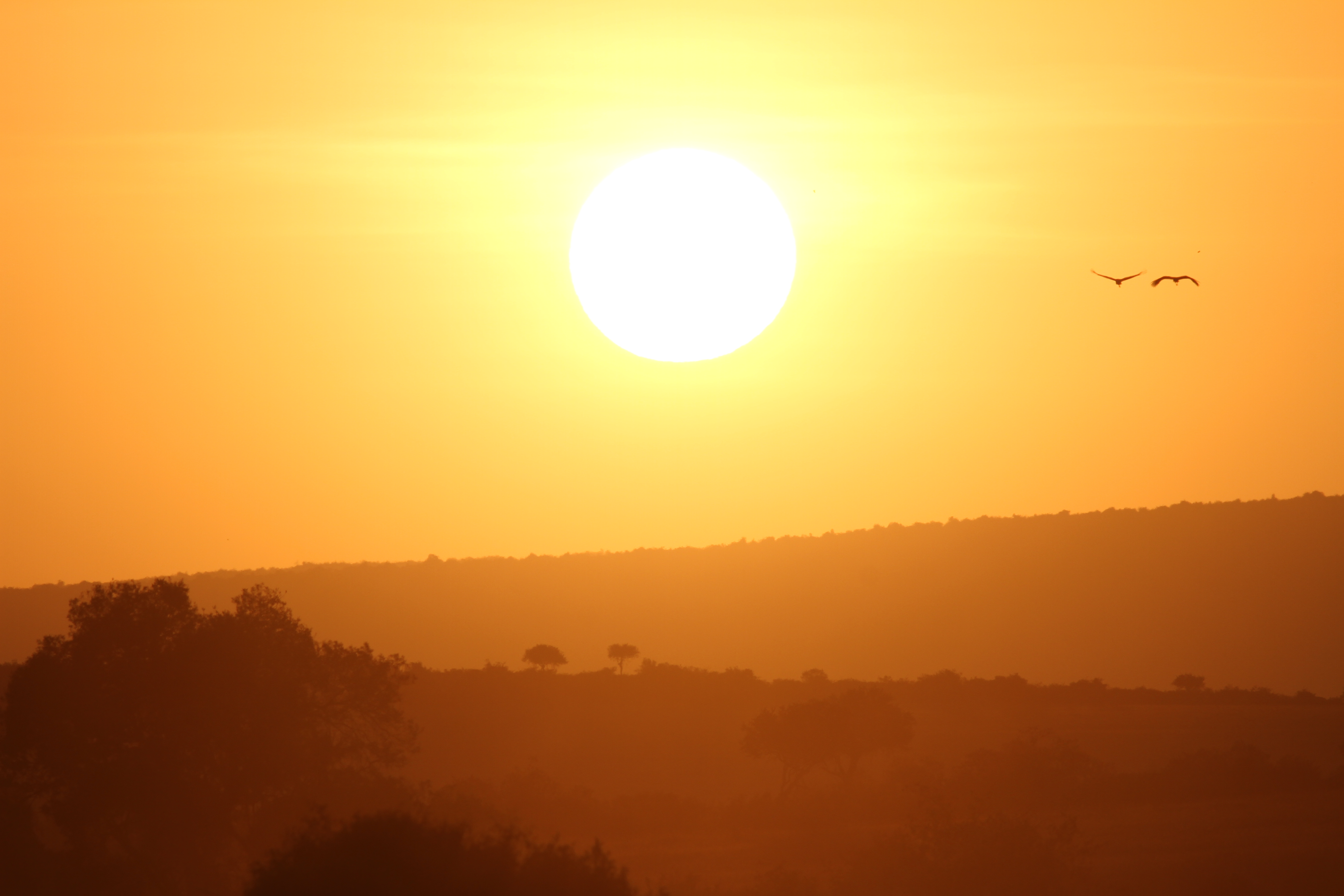
Sunrise over Maasai Mara National Reserve

The total area under conservation in the Greater Maasai Mara ecosystem amounts to almost 1,510 km^{2} (580 sq mi).

It is the northernmost section of the Mara-Serengeti ecosystem, which covers around 250 km^{2} (97 sq mi) in Tanzania and Kenya. Maasai pastoral ranches are to the north, east and west. To the south is the Serengeti National Park, the Siria/Oloololo escarpment is to the west. The Mara River, along with its tributaries the Sand and Talek rivers, are the major rivers draining the reserve. Shrubs and trees run along most drainage lines and cover the hills.

The terrain of the reserve is primarily open grassland with seasonal riverlets. In the south-east region are clumps of the distinctive acacia tree. The western border is the Esoit (Siria) Escarpment of the East African Rift, which is a system of rifts some 5,600 km (3,500 mi) long, from Ethiopia's Red Sea through Kenya, Tanzania, Malawi and into Mozambique. Wildlife tends to be most concentrated here, as the swampy ground means that access to water is always good, while tourist disruption is minimal. The easternmost border is 224 km (139 mi) from Nairobi, and hence it is the eastern regions which are most visited by tourists.

It has a semi-arid climate with biannual rains and two distinct rainy seasons. The 'long rains' last around six to eight weeks in April and May and the 'short rains', in November and December, last around four weeks. There is a significant rainfall gradient: around 800 mm (31 in) per year in the east to 1,200 mm (47 in)/year in the west.

Elevation: 1,500–2,180 m (4,920–7,150 ft); Rainfall: 83 mm (3.3 in)/month; Temperature range: 12–30 °C (54–86 °F)

== Wildlife ==
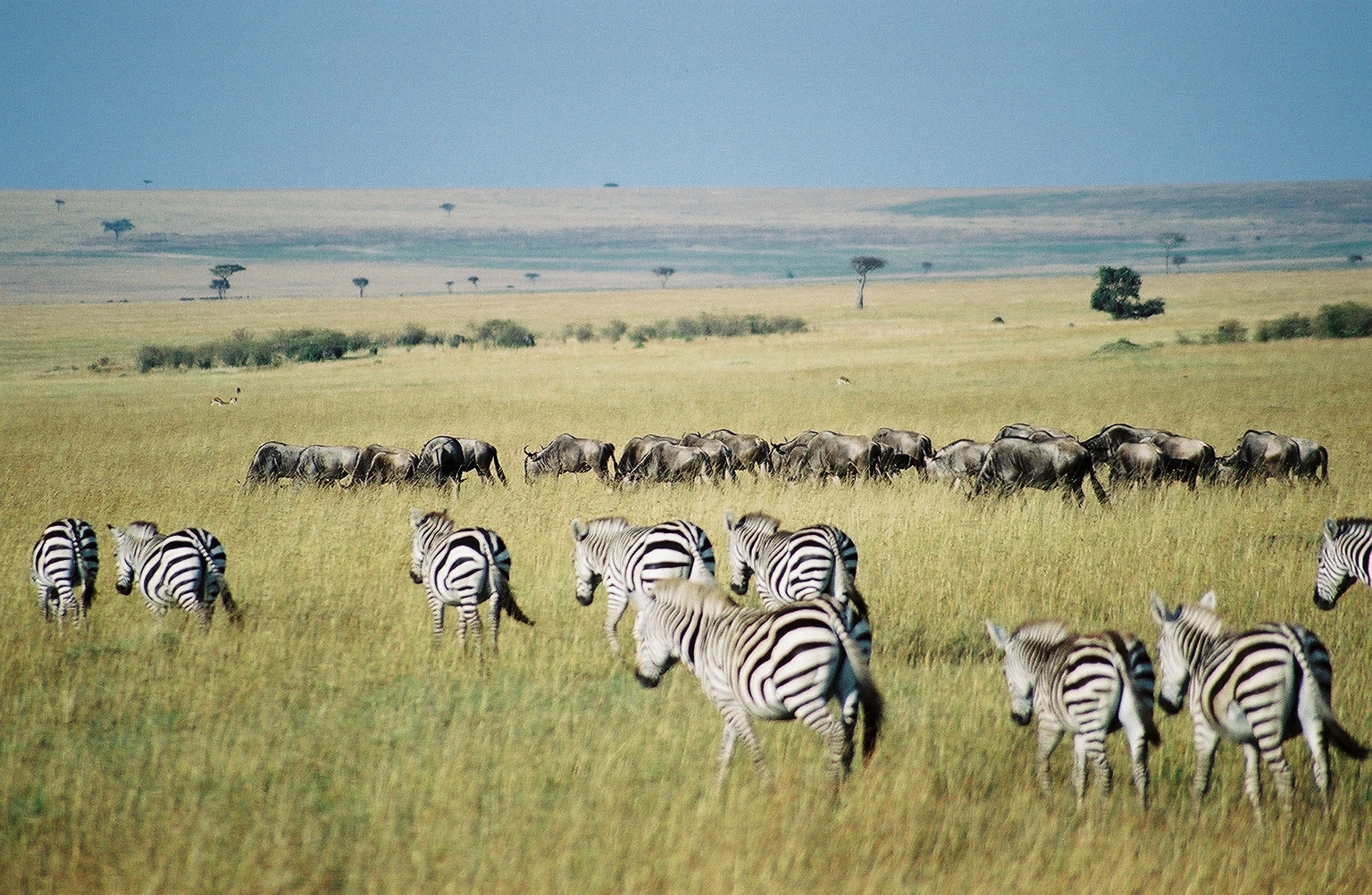
A scene with scattered bushes, animals, cloud shadows, and umbrella thorn acacia trees

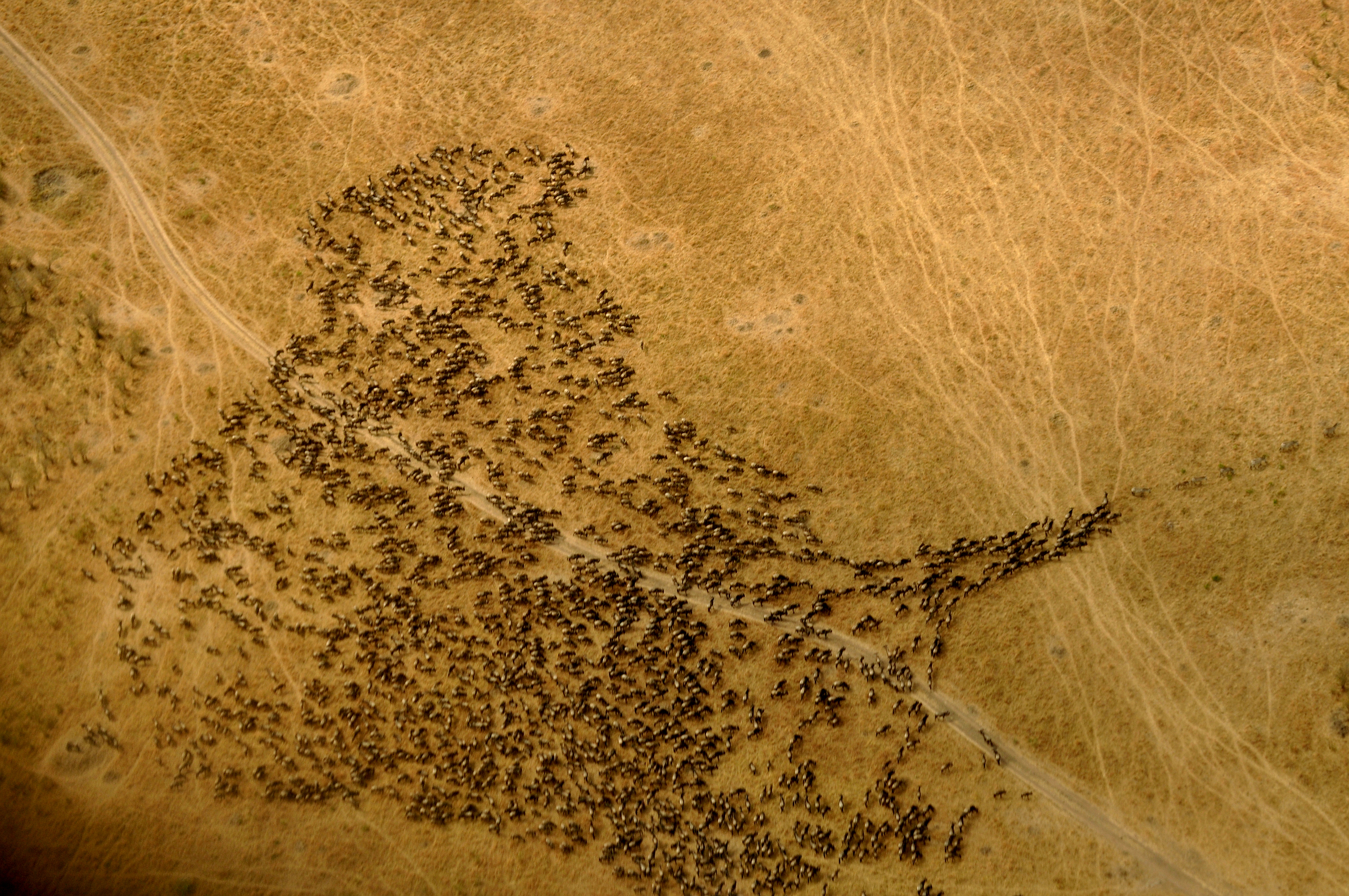
Aerial view of a herd of wildebeests following a few leading zebras

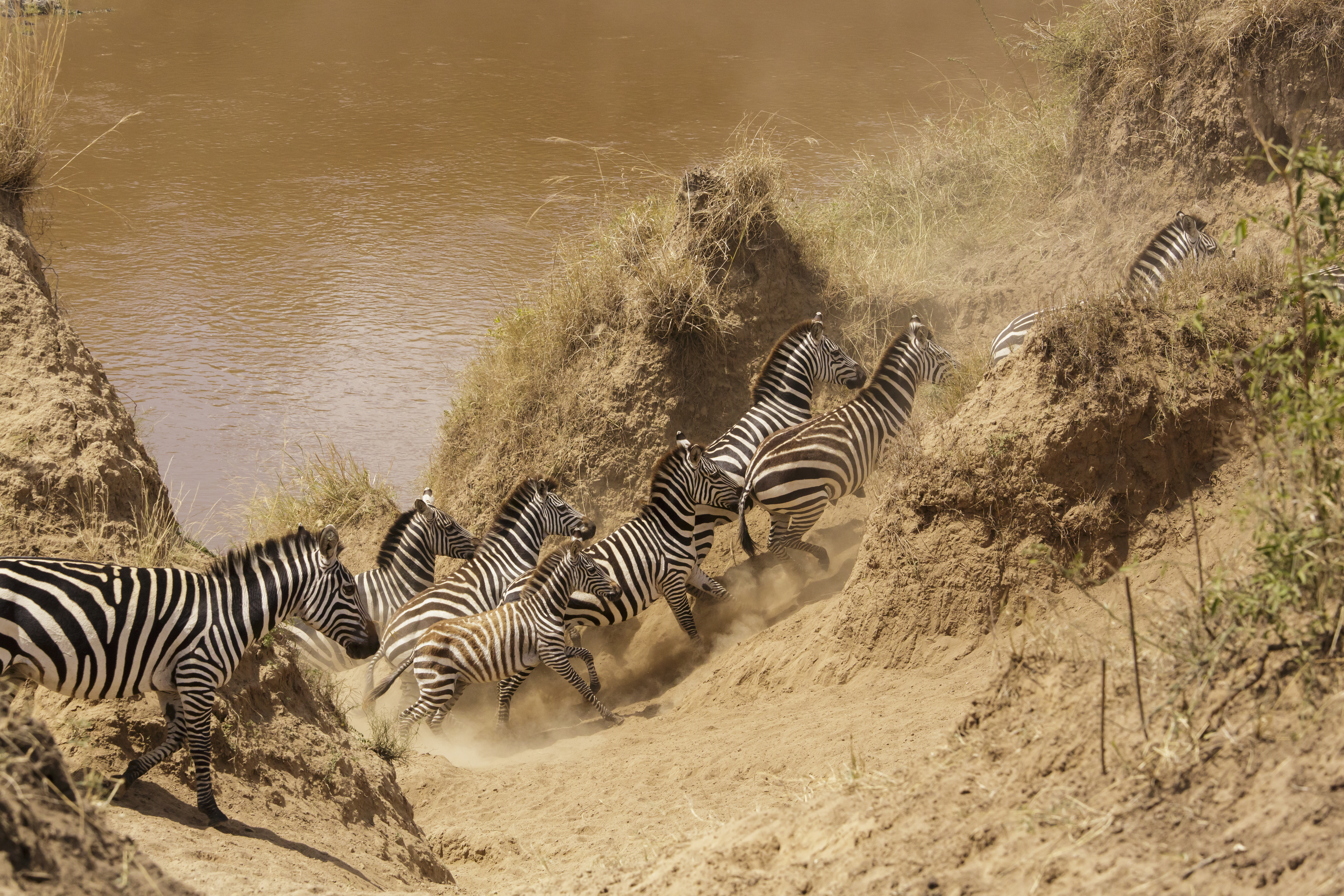
Zebras

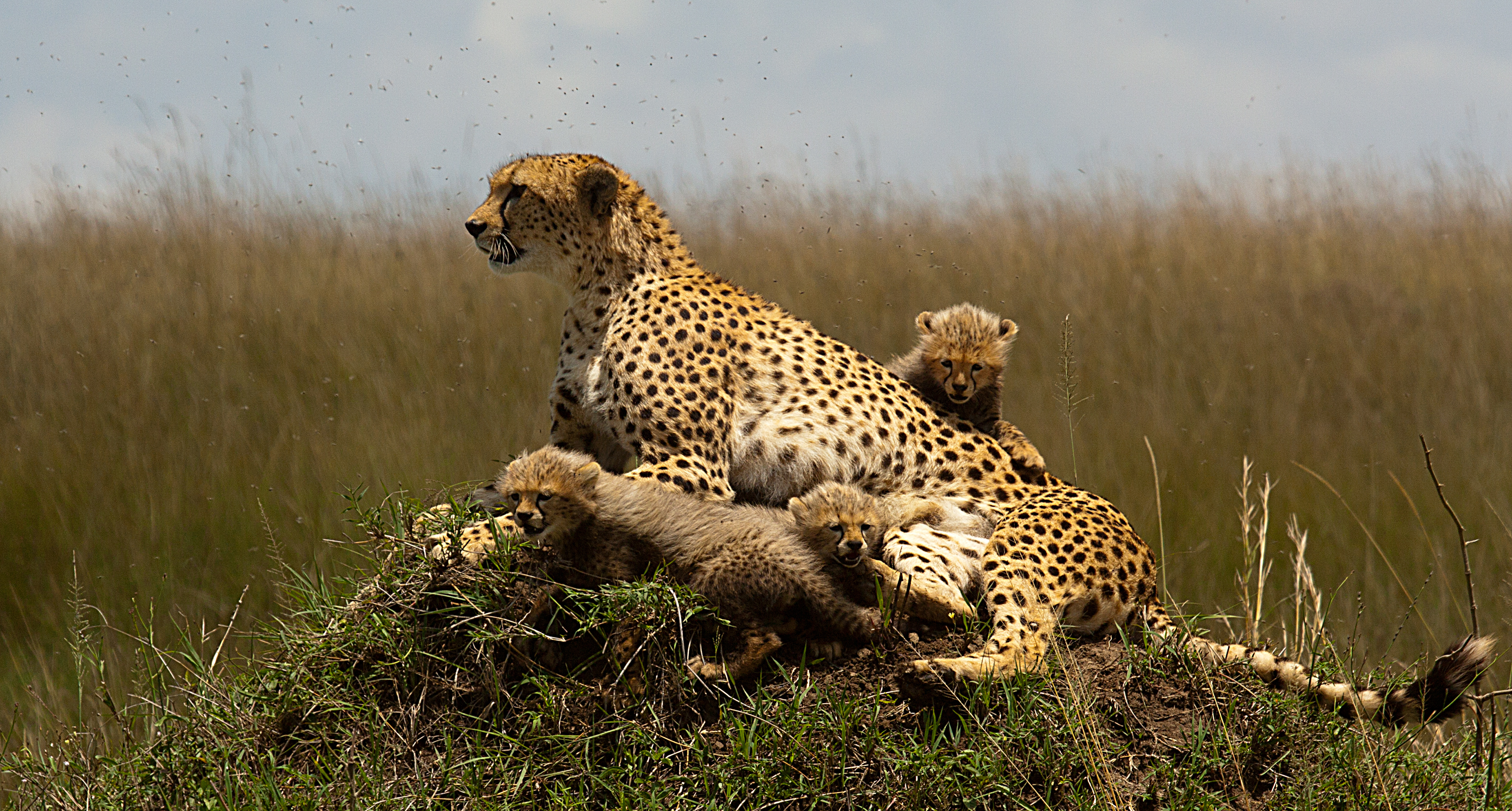
East African cheetah with cubs

Blue wildebeest are the dominant inhabitants of the Maasai Mara. Around July of each year, these animals migrate north from the Serengeti plains in search of fresh pasture, and return to the south around October. The great migration has been described as one of the most impressive natural events worldwide. It involves some 1.3 million blue wildebeest, 500000 Thomson's gazelles, 97000 topi, 18000 common elands, and 200000 Grant's zebras.

All members of the "Big Five" – lions, African leopards, African bush elephants, African buffaloes and black rhinoceros – can be seen at Maasai Mara.

The Maasai Mara is the only protected area in Kenya with an indigenous black rhino population unaffected by translocations. Due to its size, the Mara can support one of the largest populations in Africa. The population of black rhinos was fairly numerous until 1960, but it was severely depleted by poaching in the 1970s and early 1980s, dropping to a low of 15 individuals. Numbers have been slowly increasing, but the population was still only up to an estimated 23 in 1999. The Mara Conservancy, one of the managing bodies of the reserve, reported 120 black rhinos in 1971 and 18 in 1984. They claimed one black rhino in 2001 when they began management and a stable 25-30 in 2023.

Large carnivores are found in the reserve. Lions are the most dominant and are found here in large numbers. The spotted hyena is another abundant carnivore that often compete with lions for food. Leopards occur anywhere in the reserve where there are trees for them to escape to. East African cheetahs also occur in high numbers on the open savanna, hunting gazelle and wildebeest. African wild dogs are quite rare here due to the widespread transmission of diseases like canine distemper and the heavy competition they face with lions, who can often ravage their populations. Their packs also roam and travel far distances throughout the plains, making it hard to track them. Smaller carnivores include African wolves, black-backed jackals, African striped weasels, caracals, servals, honey badgers, aardwolves, African wildcats, side-striped jackals, bat-eared foxes, Striped polecats, African civets, genets, several mongoose species and African clawless otters.

The area has been named an Important Bird Area by BirdLife International. More than 500 species of birds have been identified in the park, many of which are migrants, with almost 60 species being raptors. It is an important area for the threatened birds that call this area home for at least part of the year. These include: vultures, marabou storks, secretary birds, hornbills, crowned cranes, ostriches, long-crested eagles, African pygmy-falcons and the lilac-breasted roller, which is the national bird of Kenya.

The great migration is one of the largest and most complex wildlife events on Earth, involving over 1.3 million wildebeest, along with hundreds of thousands of zebras and gazelles, moving between Tanzania’s Serengeti and Kenya’s Masai Mara each year. Scientists describe the migration as a continuous, clockwise cycle driven by rainfall patterns and the search for fresh grazing grounds (Norton-Griffiths and Westerberg). The river crossings at the Mara River are among the most dramatic moments, as animals face strong currents and predators such as crocodiles and lions. According to the Kenya Wildlife Service, the migration typically reaches the Masai Mara between July and October, though timing varies with climate and seasonal rainfall. The event plays a critical ecological role by fertilizing grasslands, dispersing seeds, and sustaining predator populations across the ecosystem. Conservation researchers note that the migration also depends on open wildlife corridors, which face increasing pressure from fencing and land-use changes (Homewood and Rodgers). Local conservancies and community partnerships in the Greater Mara ecosystem help maintain these corridors by supporting sustainable land management and tourism revenue for Maasai landowners (Masai Mara Wildlife Conservancies Association). The great migration is also a major economic driver, drawing visitors from around the world and contributing significantly to Kenya’s tourism sector (Kenya National Bureau of Statistics). Because of its scale, ecological significance, and cultural importance, the migration is frequently cited as one of the “Seven New Wonders of the World” and remains a focal point of conservation efforts in East Africa.

== Administration ==
As of 2023, Mara Conservancy manages the Mara Triangle on behalf of the county, while the County Government of Narok manages the Narok Sector. The more visited eastern part of the park, known as the Maasai Mara National Reserve, is managed by the Narok County Council. The Mara Triangle in the western part is managed Mara Conservancy, on behalf of the county, since the early 2000s.

The outer areas were administered by ranches of the Maasai community. The land was then subdivided, though some members received greater benefits than the majority of landowners. This weakened regulatory system threatens sustainable management of the Mara.

== Research ==
Since October 2012, the Mara-Meru Cheetah Project has worked in the Mara monitoring the cheetah population, estimating population status and dynamics, and evaluating the predator impact and human activity on cheetah behavior and survival. The Mara Predator Conservation Programme also operates in the Maasai Mara, cataloging and monitoring lion populations throughout the region. The spotted hyena is also studied in the Maasai Mara.

A flow assessment and trans-boundary river basin management plan between Kenya and Tanzania was completed for the river to sustain the ecosystem and the basic needs of 1 million people who depend on its water.

== Big Cat Diary ==
The BBC Television show titled "Big Cat Diary" was filmed in the Maasai Mara. The show followed the lives of the big cats living in the reserve. The show highlighted scenes from the Reserve's Musiara marsh area and the Leopard Gorge, the Fig Tree Ridge areas and the Mara River, separating the Serengeti and the Maasai Mara.

== Photography competition ==
In 2018, the Angama Foundation, a non-profit affiliated with Angama Mara, one of the Mara's luxury safari camps, launched the Greatest Maasai Mara Photographer of the Year competition, showcasing the Mara as a year-round destination and raise funds for conservation initiatives active in the Mara. The competition ran for six years, ending in 2023. The inaugural winner was British photographer Anup Shah. The 2019 winner was Lee-Anne Robertson from South Africa. Paolo Torchio won in 2020, Harry Collins in 2021, Preeti and Prashant Chacko in 2022, and Shravan Rao in 2023.

== Threats ==
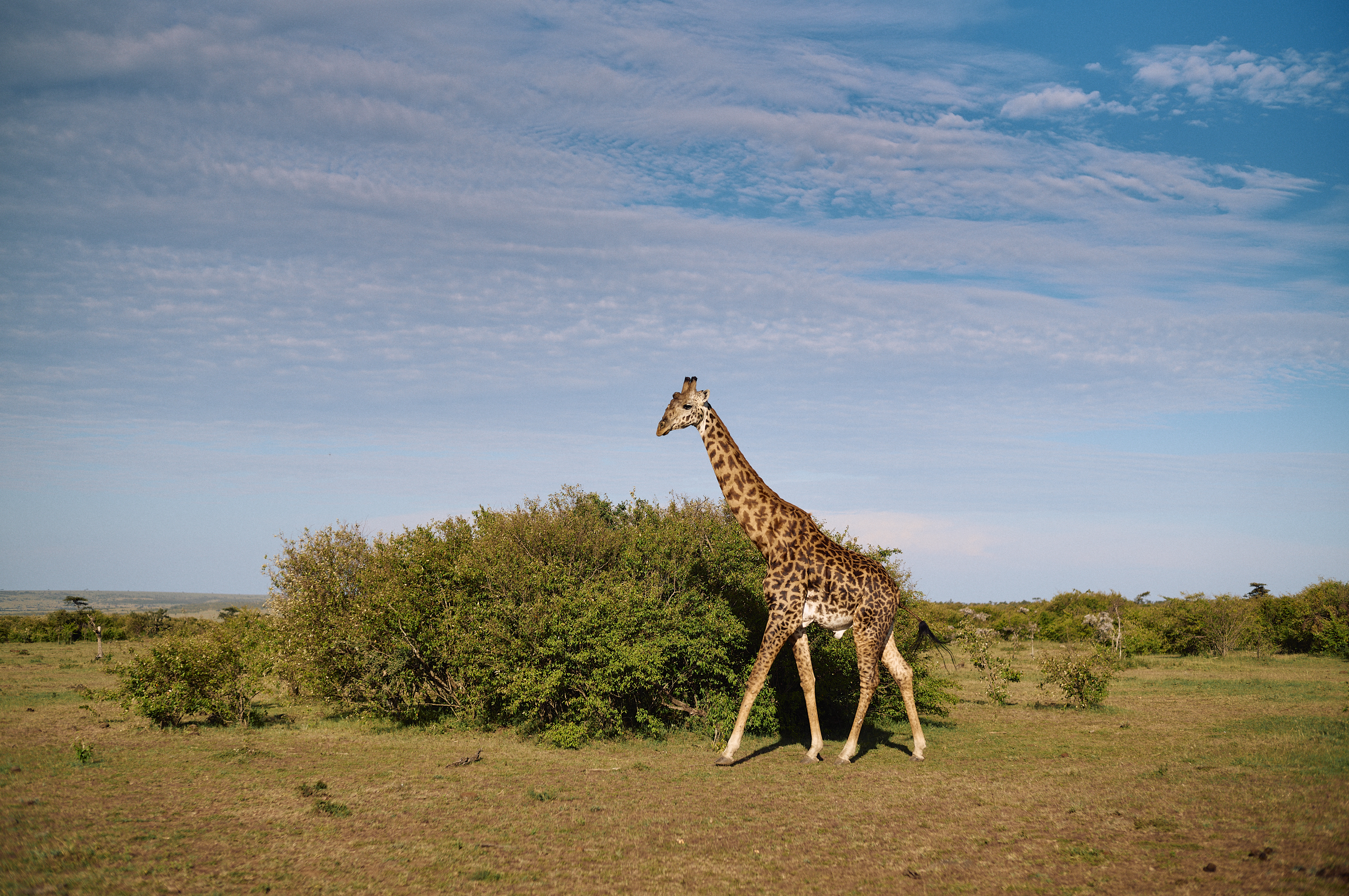
Giraffe in Maasai Mara Region

Between 1989 and 2003, ungulates were monitored in the Maasai Mara on a monthly basis; the survey revealed a decline of giraffes by 75%, of common warthogs by 80%, of hartebeest by 76%, and of impala by 67%, attributed to the increased number of livestock grazing in the park and an increase in poaching.

The rise of local populations in areas neighbouring the reserve has led to the formation of conservation organisations such as the Mara Elephant Project. The project aims to ensure the peaceful and prosperous co-existence of humans alongside wildlife. According to the project, human wildlife conflict is seen as a leading threat to the reserve as the population continues to grow. Tourism has increased exponentially. Less than 10 lodges were in the area in the late 1970s. The end of the moratorium saw facilities increase to 140 in 2008, and nearly 200 in 2016.

The growth in population creates a demand for land and resources leading to unplanned infrastructure growth. The weak cash economy creates a need to further subdivide the outlying ranch areas. These new owners have converted some land away from traditional grazing fields, negatively affecting wildlife migration. A rise in fencing exacerbates the restriction in free movement for migration, and grazing opportunities are diminished.

The Mara Conservancy encourages conservation efforts in the Reserve and has accomplished several of their goals since taking stewardship. According to their website, as of 2022 they have arrested 4,500 poachers, vaccinated 100,000 dogs against rabies and distemper, improved access roads, and provided security for the local community and tourist facilities.

== See also ==
- Olare Orok Conservancy
