= Narok County =

- County
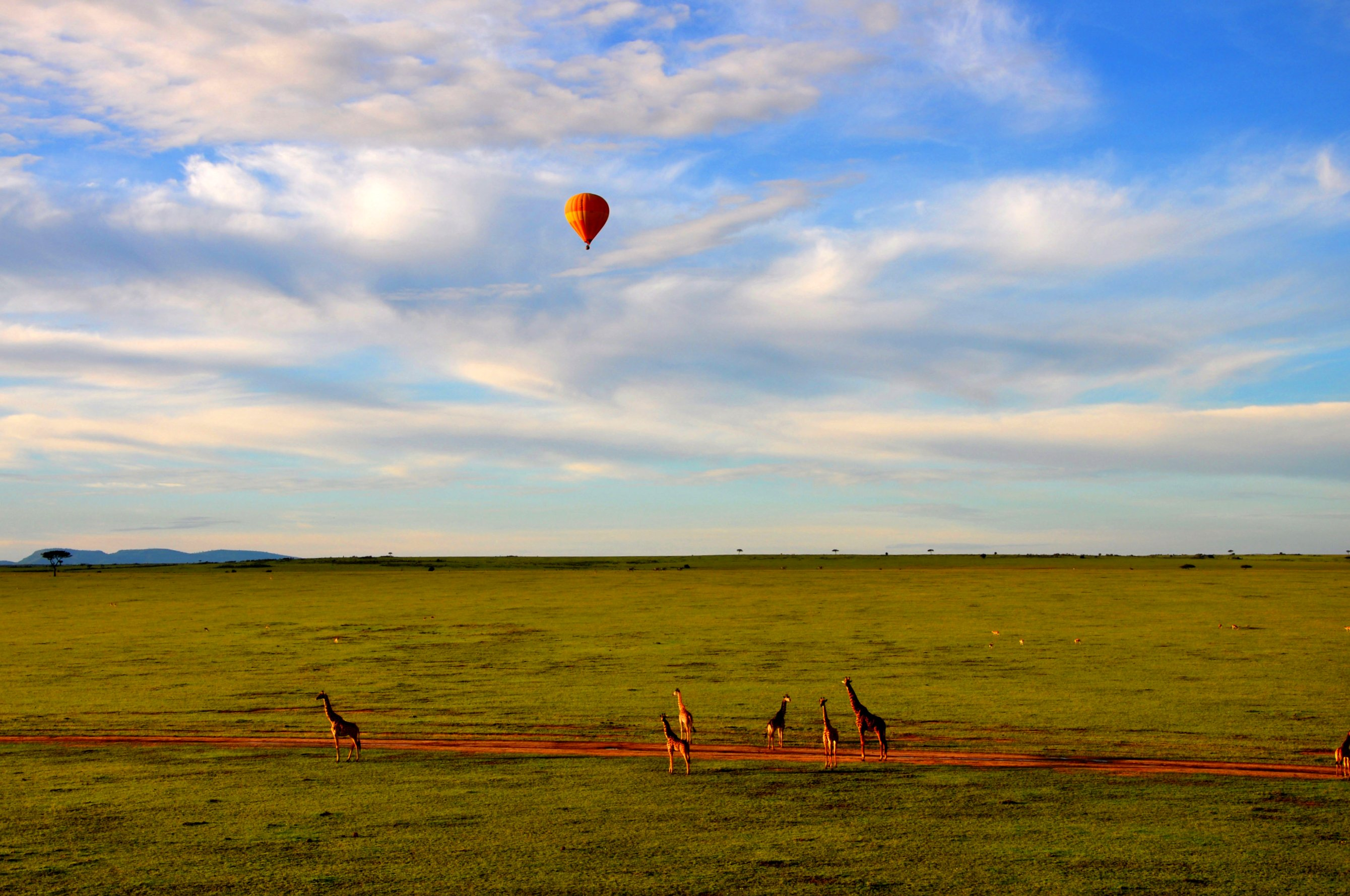
- Hot Air Balloon Safari in Maasai Mara

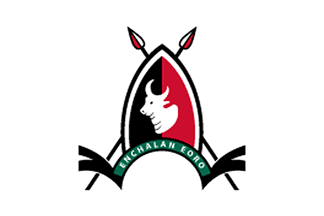
- Flag

- Location in Kenya
- Interactive map of Narok County
- Coordinates: 1°15′S 35°37′E
- Country: Kenya
- Formed: 4 March 2013
- Capital: Narok

Government
  - Governor: Patrick Keturet Ole Ntutu

Area
  - Total: 17,921.2 km^{2} (6,919.4 sq mi)

Population (2019)
  - Total: 1,157,873
  - Density: 64.6091/km^{2} (167.337/sq mi)

GDP (PPP)
  - GDP: ▲$5.054 billion (15th)(2022)
  - Per Capita: ▲$4,047 (2022) (25th)

GDP (NOMINAL)
  - GDP: ▲$1.856 billion (2022) (15th)
  - Per Capita: ▲$1,486 (2022) (25th)
- Time zone: UTC+3 (EAT)
- Website: narok.go.ke

Narok County is a county in southwestern Kenya with an estimated population of 1,157,873 according to 2019 Census. The dominant ethnic group is the Maasai. Its capital and largest town is Narok, with the only other major urban centre being Kilgoris. Narok County Government was formed by the County Governments Act of 2012 as prescribed in the 2010 Constitution of Kenya. Narok County governor is Patrick Ole Ntutu, elected in the 2022 general elections, and his Deputy is Tamalinye K. Koech.

Along with Kisii County, Narok County has reported cases of female genital mutilation in the country, despite the practice being outlawed in 2001.

== Religion ==
Religion in Narok County

Religion (2019 Census)	Number
Catholicism	152,607
Protestant	417,457
Evangelical Churches	350,885
African instituted Churches	57,673
Orthodox	6,277
Other Christian	71,598
Islam	4,805
Hindu	249
Traditionists	15,953
Other	22,476
No ReligionAtheists	45,617
Don't Know	3,710
Not Stated	122

== Geography ==
Narok County is situated in the southern part of the Great Rift Valley. It lies between latitudes 0° 50' and 1° 50' South and longitude 35° 28' and 36° 25' East. The county borders the Republic of Tanzania and six other counties – Nakuru, Bomet, Nyamira, Kisii, Migori County and Kajiado.

The Maasai Mara National Reserve and Mau Forest are located in the county.

== Economy ==
The main economic activities in the county include pastoralism, crop farming, tourism and trade among other activities undertaken in small scale.

As of 2018, gold production from mines located in Narok County was at 111 kg (245 lb).

== County subdivisions ==
The county has six constituencies:

- Narok North Constituency
- Narok South Constituency
- Narok East Constituency
- Narok West Constituency
- Emurua Dikirr Constituency
- Kilgoris Constituency

Local authorities (councils)
Authority	Type	Population*	Urban pop.*
Narok	Town	41,092	24,091
Narok County	County	324,658	2,839
Total	–	365,750	26,930
* 1999 census. Source:

Administrative divisions
Division	Population*	Urban population*	population density	Area (km^{2})	Headquarters
Central	41,162	22,488	44	935,5	Narok
Loita	15,557	0	9	1728,6	
Mara	41,964	0	9	4662,7	
Mau	77,686	1,898	30	2589,5	
Mulot	68,432	0	95	720,3	
Olokurto	44,326	837	36	1231,3	
Ololulunga	53,828	0	36	1495,2	Ololulunga
Osupuko	22,795	0	12	1899,6	
Total	365,750	25,233	24 (average)	15,263	–
* 1999 census. Sources: , ,

== Narok County wards ==
There are thirty Members of County Assembly (MCAs) representing the thirty wards at Narok County Assembly. These wards were formed in 2010 by the Boundaries Review Commission. There are six wards in Narok North Constituency, Narok South Constituency and Kilgoris Constituency respectively.

Narok West Constituency, Emurua Dikirr Constituency and Narok East Constituency each have four county wards

=== Communities ===
- Angara Naado
- Darasha ya Mawe
- Entasekera
- Entontol
- Eoret Narasha
- Iminuet
- Lemek
- Lolgorien
- Maji Moto
- Masandare
- Nairagie Ngare
- Noolpopong
- Ntuka
- Ol Lalunga
- Ol Mesuti
- Ol Ombokishi
- Shabaltaragwa
- Sintakara

== Population ==
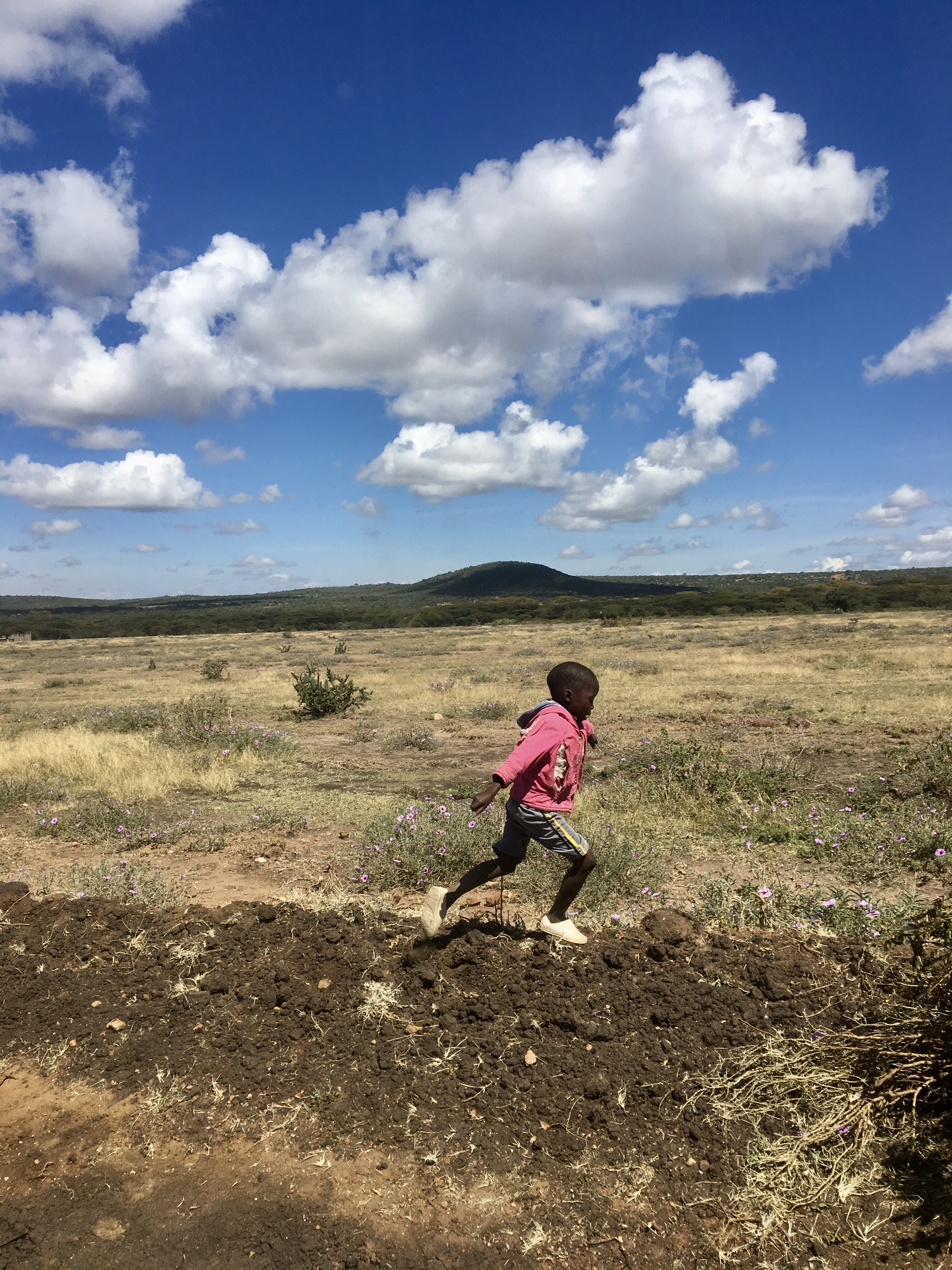
A boy running in the fields of Narok

Historical population
Year	Pop.	±%
1979	210,306	—
1989	398,272	+89.4%
1999	536,341	+34.7%
2009	850,920	+58.7%
2019	1,157,873	+36.1%

== Notable people ==
- Kurito ole Kisio — Mau Mau general
- Daniel Rudisha — Olympic world record middle-distance runner
- David Rudisha — son of Daniel, also an Olympic world record runner
- Sianto Sikawa — communications and marketing professional
