= Tsavo (disambiguation) =

Tsavo may refer to:

- Tsavo River, in Kenya
- Tsavo, a region of Kenya
- Tsavo East National Park
- Tsavo West National Park
- Tsavo Man-Eaters, a pair of lions in 1898
  - The Man-eaters of Tsavo, book by John Henry Patterson
- Tsavo sunbird (Cinnyris tsavoensis), a small bird of Kenya and Tanzania
