= Tsavo Trust =

Kenyan nonprofit wildlife conservation organisation

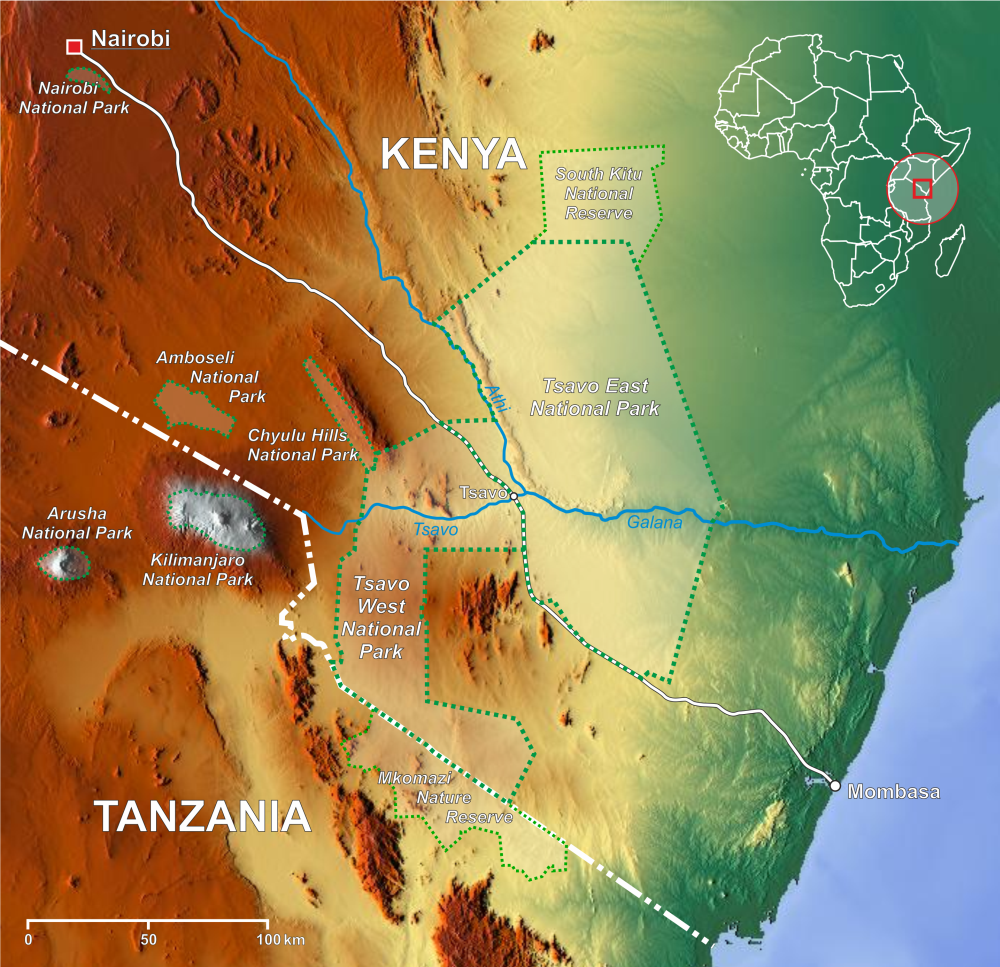
- Location of Tsavo National Parks
- Founder: Richard Moller (CEO); Stuart Herd
- Location: Mtito Andei, Kenya
- Coordinates: 02°41′24″S 38°41′24″E
- Region served: Tsavo ecosystem (16,000 square miles (41,000 km^{2}))
- Services: Conservation
- Key people: Nzioki Wa Makau (Chairman of the Board); Richard Moller (CEO); Stuart Herd; Munira Bashir; Pat Awori; Conrad Thorpe
- Website: tsavotrust.org

The Tsavo Trust is a non-profit wildlife conservation organisation, which covers Tsavo East National Park, Tsavo West National Park, and Chyulu Hills National Park in Kenya. The trust was founded by Nzioki Wa Makau (Chairman of the Board) and Richard Moller who is chief executive officer and an experienced bush pilot. The stated aim of the trust is the protection of wildlife, especially African elephants, and the reduction of the ivory trade. In June 2014, the Tsavo Trust came into the international spotlight when they suggested the death of Kenya's iconic and most well-known elephant, Satao, killed by ivory poachers with a poisoned arrow.

The Tsavo ecosystem consists of 16,000 square miles (41,000 km^{2}) or arid and semi arid land in southern Kenya. The national parks within this region are managed by Kenya Wildlife Service. Around the parks, but within the Tsavo ecosystem, are a number of small towns, villages, ranches, and farms. Contained in this system is the largest population of African elephants in Kenya, numbering 14,964 as of 2021.

There are a number of critical issues in the Tsavo ecosystem which include: a high rate of poverty among the people in the region, poor access to education and healthcare, degradation of habitat, ethnic conflict over resources, loss of wildlife, and lack of financial and technical resources to deal with these issues. In this context, the stated mission of the Tsavo Trust is to (1) to safeguard biodiversity and empower communities in the greater Tsavo ecosystem. Tsavo Trust does this by being a crucial partner to the Kenya Wildlife Service, providing support for aerial and ground biodiversity monitoring, anti-poaching and security operations, and attracting funding to the TCA. Tsavo Trust is also pioneering the establishment of community conservancies in the Tsavo ecosystem (outside of the Taita-Taveta Ranches), providing much needed community development benefits and increasing the habitat available for wildlife.
