= Chyulu Hills =

Mountain range in Kenya

Chyulu Hills National Park
- Hifadhi ya Taifa ya Milima ya Chyulu
- IUCN category II (national park)
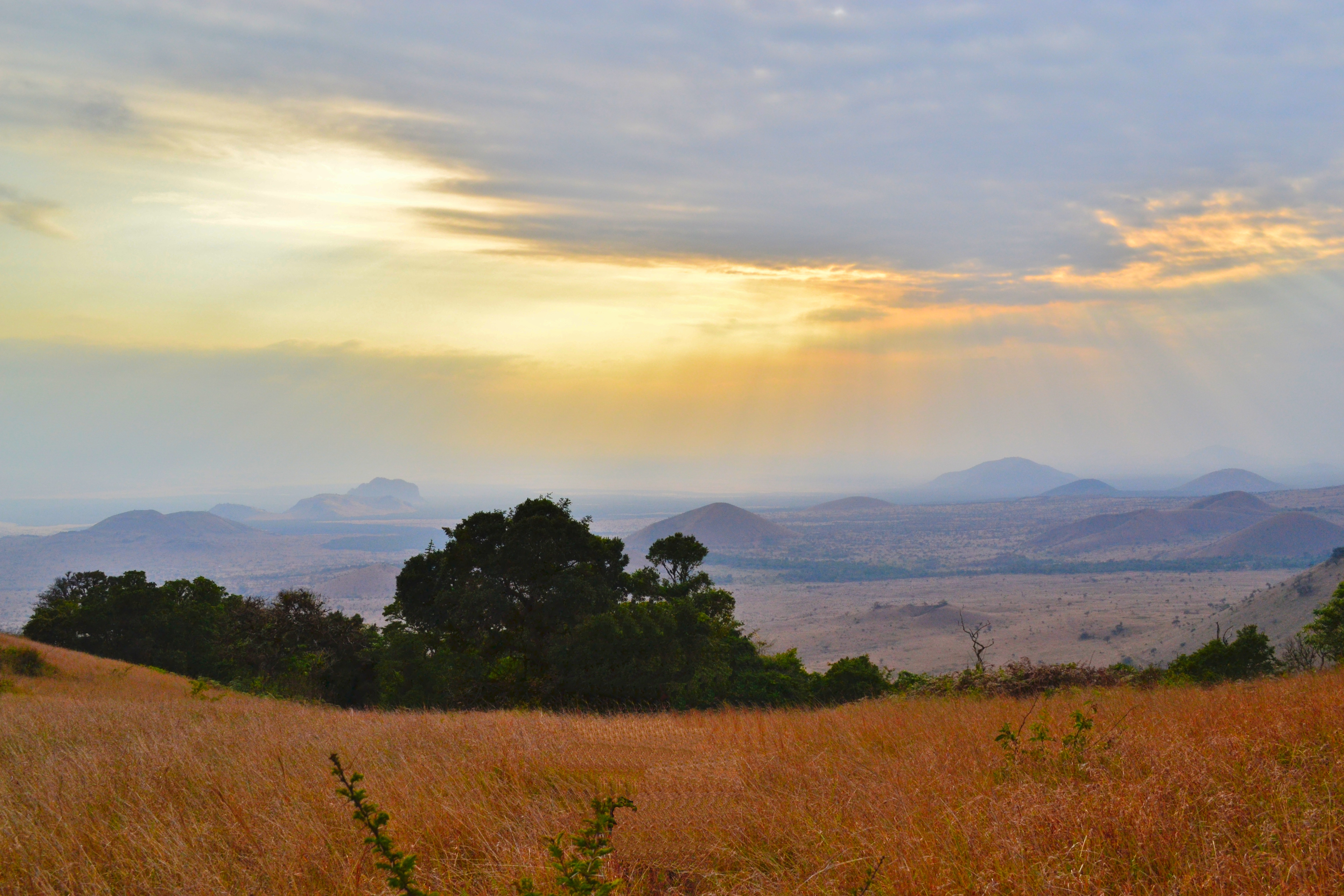
- Chyulu Hills

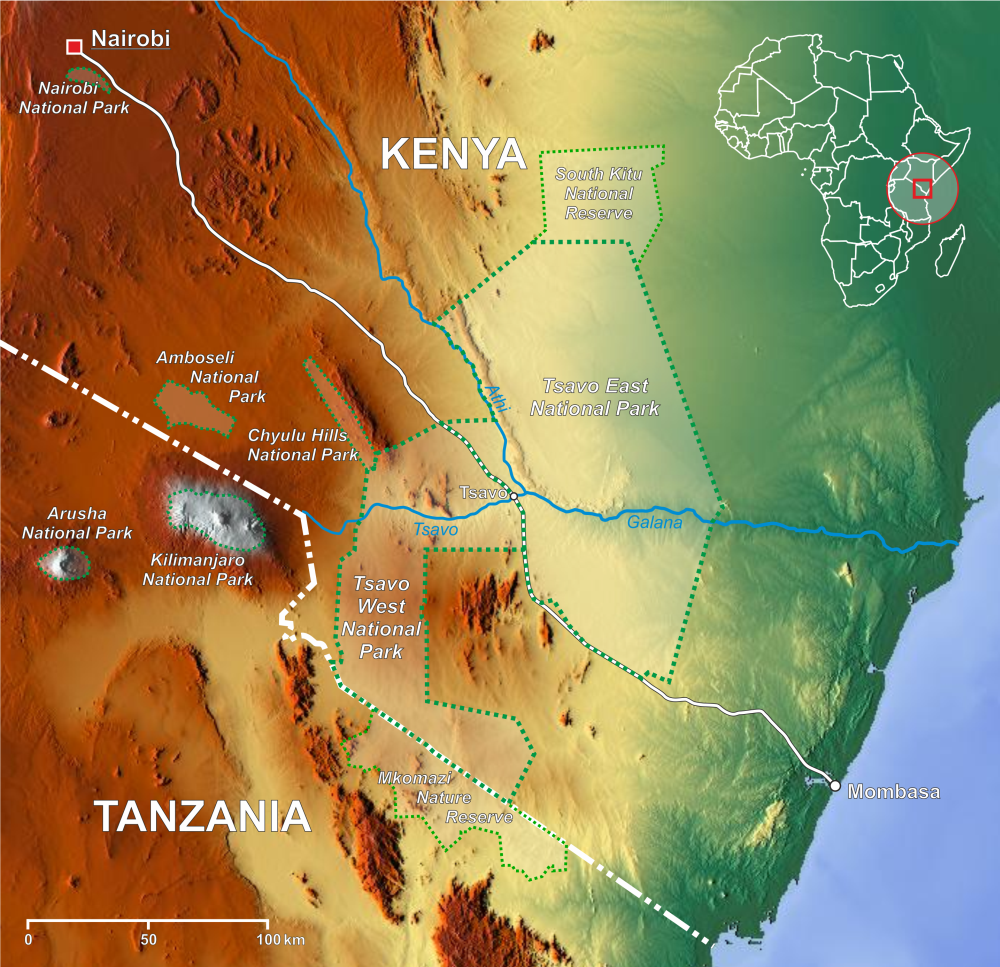
- Map of Chyulu Hills National Park
- Nearest city: Tsavo
- Coordinates: 2°36′S 37°51′E
- Area: 741 km^{2} (286 sq mi)
- Established: Gazetted in 1983; Last two eruptions of (Shaitani and Chainu) occurred in 1856
- Governing body: Kenya Wildlife Service

The Chyulu Hills is a mountain range in Makueni County in southeastern Kenya. It forms a 100 km (62 mi)-long volcanic field in an elongated northwest–southeast direction. Its highest peak is 2,188 m (7,178 ft) high.

The Leviathan Cave (also known as Kisula caves) in Chyulu Hills National Park is about 11 km (6.8 mi) long, one of the longest caves in Africa. The national park is part of the Tsavo conservation area which covers Tsavo West National Park, Tsavo East National Park and the Kibwezi Forest.

The park's main gate is in Kibwezi in Makueni County.

The Chyulu Hills stood in for the Ngong Hills in the film Out of Africa.

== Geography ==
The Chyulu Hills are located about 150 km (93 mi) east of the Kenya Rift. The hills consists of several hundred small flows and cones. Volcanism in the area started about 1.4 million years ago in the northern parts of the hills, and over time the volcanism propagated towards the southeast. These volcanoes are still considered active, since their last two eruptions (Shaitani and Chaimu/Kyaimu) occurred in 1856. Within the hills is the Leviathan Cave, one of the longest lava tubes in the world.

Kibwezi town is located 30 km (19 mi) northeast of the Chyulu Hills.

The Chyulu Hills do not have any permanent rivers, but rainfall on hills feeds the Tsavo and Galana rivers and Mzima Springs on the surrounding plains.

Chyulu hills divide the Tsavo and Amboseli plains. The area is inhabited by Maasai and Kamba people.

== Ecology ==
Lower parts of the hills are composed of grassland and thicket, while above roughly 1,800 m (5,900 ft) is dominated by montane forest. The forest contains Neoboutonia macrocalyx, soccerball fruit, African cherry, Strombosia scheffleri, Cassipourea malosana, black ironwood, and African holly. Some isolated parts are dominated by Abyssinian coral tree. Lower parts of the forest are dominated either by African juniper or Commiphora baluensis.

Mammals found in the hills include eastern black rhinos, Cape buffaloes, bushbucks, elands, elephants, bushpigs, Masai giraffe, leopards, lions, mountain reedbucks, steinbok, wildebeest and Grant's zebras. Cheetahs are found at the plains of Chyulu Hills. Various snakes inhabit the hills, like black mamba, puff adder and rock python.

There are various bird species on the hills, with some endemic races. Bird species include: Shelley's francolin, white-starred robin, orange ground thrush, cinnamon bracken warbler, Ayres's hawk-eagle, African crowned eagle, martial eagle, and Abbott's starling.

There is wild khat growing on the hills, which is picked by local people. There is also some cultivation of khat around the hills. Khat from Chyulu hills is known as Chuylu, as opposed to Miraa, which is cultivated in the Meru County.

== Conservation ==
The Chyulu Hills National Park comprises the eastern flank of the hills and is operated by the Kenya Wildlife Service. The park was formed in 1983. It forms a northwestern continuation of Tsavo West National Park. The western flank of the hills is covered by the West Chyulu Game Conservation owned by Maasai group ranches.

Potential threats to the ecosystem include poaching, overgrazing by growing population of Maasai herders and scarcity of water.

The Chyulu Hills Carbon Project is a forest carbon (REDD+) project in the Chyulu Hills landscape, launched in 2017 with partners including the Maasai Wilderness Conservation Trust and Conservation International Kenya.
