= Tsavo Conservation Area =

Protected areas in Kenya and Tanzania

The Tsavo Conservation Area (sometimes referred to as the Tsavo Ecosystem) is a complex of protected and other wildlife areas in southern Kenya and north-eastern Tanzania. It is composed of Tsavo East National Park, Tsavo West National Park, Chyulu Hills National Park, South Kitui National Reserve, ranches in Galana, Taita, Kulalu and Amboseli and adjacent private and communal lands. Bordering Mkomazi National Park in Tanzania, the Tsavo Conservation Area comprises an area of around 42,000 km^{2}, of which over 25,000 km^{2} is protected. The protected portion in Kenya represent almost half of the country's protected areas.

The wider conservation area harbours Kenya's largest elephant population, at 40% of Kenya's total elephant population, as well as 18% of Kenya's black rhino population, much of which live in the Ngulia Rhino Sanctuary. There are indications that the elephant population is expanding at a rate of 4-5% per annum, however there is concern that poaching remains a significant threat, with 2011 the worst year on record since the Ivory Trade Ban. In addition, numbers of the critically endangered Hirola and endangered Grevy's zebra have been introduced due to difficulty in offering the species protection in their native habitats.

The Tsavo Conservation Area is one of the most-visited protected areas in Kenya; however, as the majority of visitors remain in the southern parts of Tsavo East and the northern parts of Tsavo West, much of the area has remained undisturbed. However, the Conservation Area is bisected by the Nairobi–Mombasa Road, the Uganda Railway and the newer Mombasa–Nairobi Standard Gauge Railway (SGR). Although underpasses for wildlife have were built as part of the construction of the SGR, radio-collaring evidence showed that the movement of elephants between the two Tsavo East and Tsavo West National Park has been greatly curtailed. Wildlife movement between the two National Parks will be further impeded by the construction of the proposed Nairobi Expressway.
