= Leptopelis concolor =

Conservation status
- Least Concern (IUCN 3.1)

Scientific classification
- Kingdom: Animalia
- Phylum: Chordata
- Class: Amphibia
- Order: Anura
- Family: Arthroleptidae
- Genus: Leptopelis
- Species: L. concolor

Binomial name
- Leptopelis concolor Ahl, 1929

Synonyms
- Leptopelis argenteus concolor —Schiøtz, 1975

Species of amphibian

Leptopelis concolor is a species of frog in the family Arthroleptidae. It is found in the coastal lowlands of southern Somalia, Kenya, and northeastern Tanzania. Common names triad tree frog, Witu forest treefrog, and pale-coloured tree frog have been coined for it.

Leptopelis concolor inhabits savanna woodland and clearings in dry forest at elevations below 1,500 m (4,900 ft). It can survive in modified habitats as long as good vegetation cover remains. The eggs are laid in a nest buried in mud near water. It is a common species and, given its adaptability, it is not considered to be facing any significant threats. It is present in several protected areas, such as the Tsavo East and Tsavo West National Parks in Kenya.
