= Leviathan Cave =

Lava tube in eastern Kenya

Leviathan Cave, also known as the Grotte de Leviathan, is a lava tube in eastern Kenya first discovered in 1975. Although it has been segmented by the movement of tectonic plates, the overall length of the lava tube spans a distance of 11.5 km (7.1 mi). It is the longest and deepest known lava tube in Africa.

Leviathan Cave is located in the Chyulu Hills National Park at the edge of the Nyiri Desert, which is found northwest of Tsavo West National Park.

In the 1980s, Leviathan Cave was the third-longest known lava tube in the world. However, modern surveys have found newer, longer tubes, and have located longer passages of known tubes. Leviathan Cave is still the longest tube in Africa, but is only the 11th-longest lava tube in the world.

== Description ==
Leviathan Cave is divided into two sections, the Upper Leviathan and the Lower Leviathan. The Upper Leviathan is 9,152 m (30,026 ft) long, with a depth of 408 m (1,339 ft). The Lower Leviathan is 2,071 m (6,795 ft) long, with a depth of 70 m (230 ft). These segments are considered separately when ranking the length of the Leviathan, per international standard.

Like all lava tubes, Leviathan Cave was formed by hot lava flowing beneath a cooled crust.

== See also ==
- Kazumura Cave – world's longest lava tube in Hawaii
- Mau-Mau Cave – another Kenyan cave
- Kitum Cave – Kenyan cave "mined" by elephants for salt
