= Isilo (elephant) =

South African elephant

Isilo (c. 1956 – 2014) was one of South Africa’s largest African elephants and the largest living tusker in the southern hemisphere before his death. He was known as a tusker, a male elephant with tusks weighing over 100 pounds.

Although Isilo died of natural causes relating to old age, his death attracted international media attention because his tusks, considered a National Heritage artifact, were missing when his body was discovered.

== Background ==
Isilo was an African elephant that lived in Tembe Elephant Park in South Africa. "Isilo" means “King” in Zulu. Born during the late 1950s, he was estimated to have been at least 58 years old when he died. Isilo weighed between 6.5 and 7 tonnes. Isilo's tusks were estimated to be more than 3 meters (9 feet) long. The right tusk weighed about 65 kg (143 pounds) and the left about 60 kg (132 pounds).

== Death ==
Isilo died of natural causes in an area known to be his home range in a southwest section of the park around 10 January 2014. His carcass was discovered in late March 2014 and his death was announced on April 4, 2014 by Ezemvelo KZN Wildlife and Ernest Robbertse, Manager of the Tembe Elephant Park Lodge.

However, his tusks were missing, having apparently been removed sometime between his death and the discovery of his corpse, most likely by suspected rhino poachers and transported over the border into Mozambique where tusks are shipped to the Far East, the world's biggest market for ivory.

Isilo's tusks were estimated to have a black market value of approximately R3 million (about US$ 250,000).

== Reactions to the death ==
Isilo's death resulted in international media attention due to his celebrity status and the loss of his tusks, considered a National Heritage artifact.

Isilo's tusks were the heritage of the Tembe clan, part owners and ancestral custodians of the Tembe Elephant Park. Inkosi Mabhudu Tembe, chief of the Tembe clan, planned to offer the tusks to South Africa for display at the King Shaka Airport in Durban to promote tourism. In April 2014, Inkosi Tembe offered a R100 000 (approx US$ 8 600) reward for the return of the missing tusks.

== Other large tuskers ==
In Tsavo East National Park in Kenya in June 2014, Satao, the biggest tusker in East Africa (with ivory as big as Isilo's), was killed by poachers with a poisoned spear. This came shortly after Satao survived another similar attempt.

== Books and other media ==
Isilo is acknowledged in two books by Dr. Johan Marais, who believes that the largest elephants in the world can be found in the Tembe National Elephant Park:

- Marais, Johan (2008) Great Tuskers of Africa Penguin Global; ISBN 0143025066
- Marais, Johan (2011) In Search of Africa’s Great Tuskers Penguin Global; ISBN 0143026550

James Currie, international wildlife expert, was the last person to film Isilo before the tusker's death. In 2016, Currie launched a Kickstarter campaign to film Last of the Big Tuskers a documentary about the largest elephants on earth and what is being done to ensure their survival. The documentary was released in October 2018.

== See also ==
- Elephant hunting in Kenya
- List of individual elephants
