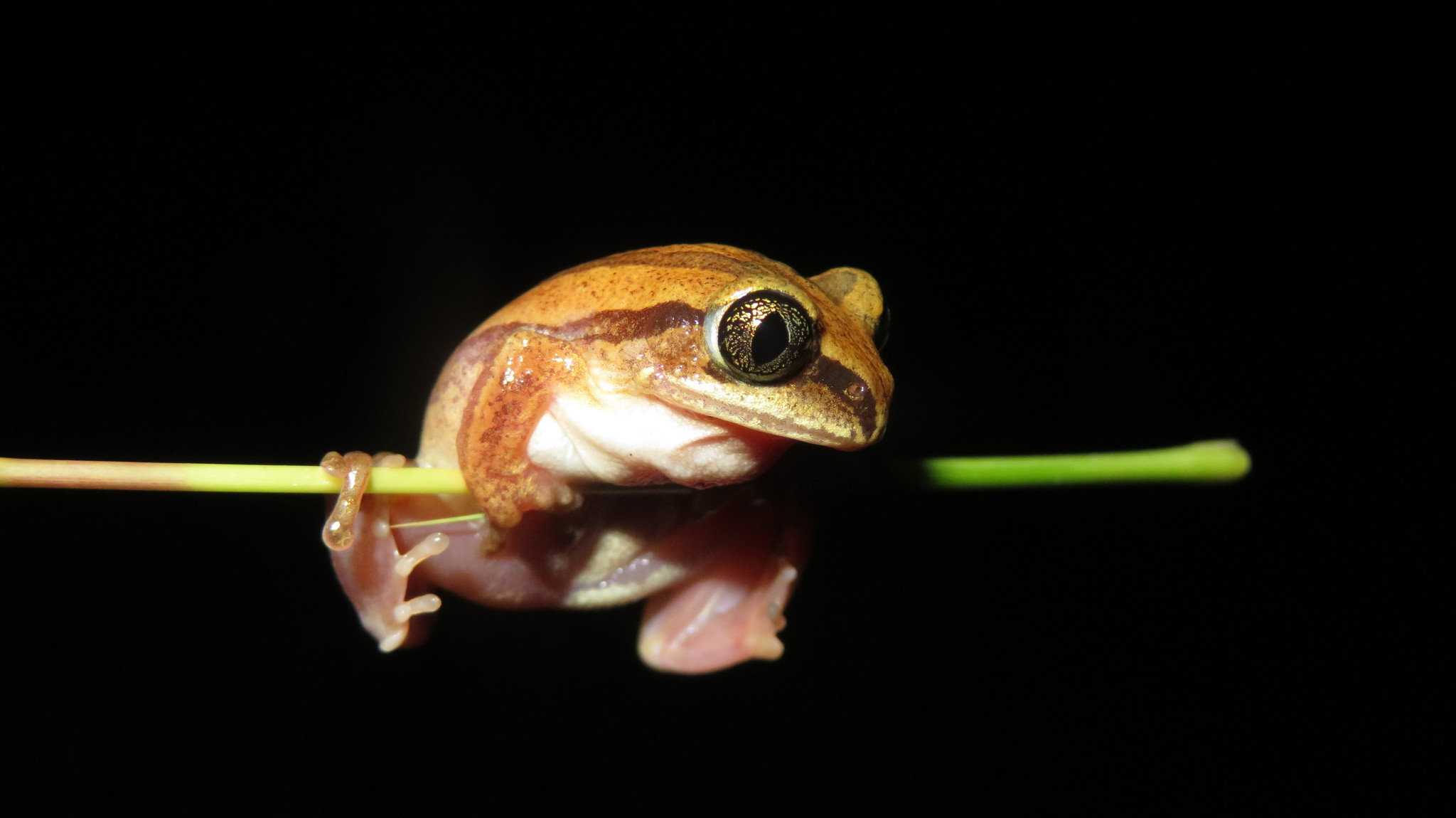

Conservation status
- Least Concern (IUCN 3.1)

Scientific classification
- Kingdom: Animalia
- Phylum: Chordata
- Class: Amphibia
- Order: Anura
- Family: Arthroleptidae
- Genus: Leptopelis
- Species: L. argenteus

Binomial name
- Leptopelis argenteus (Pfeffer, 1893)

Synonyms
- Hylambates argenteus Pfeffer, 1893; Leptopelis argenteus meridionalis Schiøtz, 1975; Leptopelis broadleyi Poynton, 1985 — replacement name for L. a. meridionalis

= Leptopelis argenteus =

Species of amphibian

Leptopelis argenteus, also known as the silvery tree frog or triad tree frog, is a frog species in the Arthroleptidae family. It is found in coastal Kenya, Tanzania, south to northern Mozambique, southern Malawi, and the eastern highlands of Zimbabwe.

It is now synonymous with Leptopelis broadleyi (Broadley's forest tree frog), (ASW expresses some hesitation though), a name that the IUCN SSC Amphibian Specialist Group, and the African Amphibians do not recognize. However, the AmphibiaWeb recognizes it as a valid species.

== Taxonomy ==
This species was described by Georg Johann Pfeffer in 1893 based on a specimen collected south of Bagamoyo, Tanzania. Current accounts differ in their delimitation and distribution; the synonyms and distribution in this article follow the Amphibian Species of the World (ASW). However, the IUCN SSC Amphibian Specialist Group (2016) only reports it from Tanzania, possibly extending into Mozambique. The AmphibiaWeb gives a distribution similar to that in ASW, but recognizes Leptopelis broadleyi as a valid species. Furthermore, Leptopelis concolor is perhaps a subspecies of Leptopelis argenteus.

== Description ==
Depending on the source, males measure 29–33 mm (1.1–1.3 in) in snout–vent length (SVL), or males and females can be as large as 45 and 52 mm (1.8 and 2.0 in) SVL, respectively. It resembles Leptopelis concolor morphologically but differs in having two dark dorsolateral stripes and a more diffuse canthal and lateral line. Webbing in the feet is reduced. There is usually a dark triangle between the eyes.

== Habitat and conservation ==
According to the IUCN SSC Amphibian Specialist Group, this species inhabits savanna woodland with many trees and bushes. It can survive in altered habitats, provided that good vegetation cover remains. Males call high up in bushes and grasses, also far from water. The eggs are laid in a nest buried in mud near water.

Leptopelis argenteus is a common and adaptable species that faces no significant threats. It is sometimes present in the international pet trade. It occurs in many protected areas. As Leptopelis broadleyi, it is found in Malawi, Mozambique, and Zimbabwe.
