= Satao (elephant) =

Large African elephant in Kenya

- Satao, one of Kenya's tuskers
- Species: African bush elephant (Loxodonta africana)
- Sex: Male
- Born: c. 1968
- Died: 30 May 2014 (aged 45–46)
- Known for: Iconic Kenyan tusker

Satao (c. 1968 – 30 May 2014) was one of Kenya's largest African elephants. He was known as a tusker because his tusks were so long that they almost touched the ground. The Tsavo Trust announced that Satao was killed by poachers using a poisoned arrow on 30 May 2014.

== Background ==
Satao was an African elephant that lived in Tsavo East National Park, one of the largest wildlife parks in the world, with a large population of elephants. He was thought to have been born during the late 1960s and to have been at least 45 years old when he was killed. He was estimated to be one of the largest elephants in the world at the time of his death and has been described as one of Kenya's most iconic and well-known tuskers (i.e., male elephants with tusks that almost reach the ground). Satao's tusks were over 6.5 feet (2.0 m) long and he was estimated to be the largest of the few remaining tuskers living in Kenya. More than half of all of the remaining African big tuskers are in Kenya.

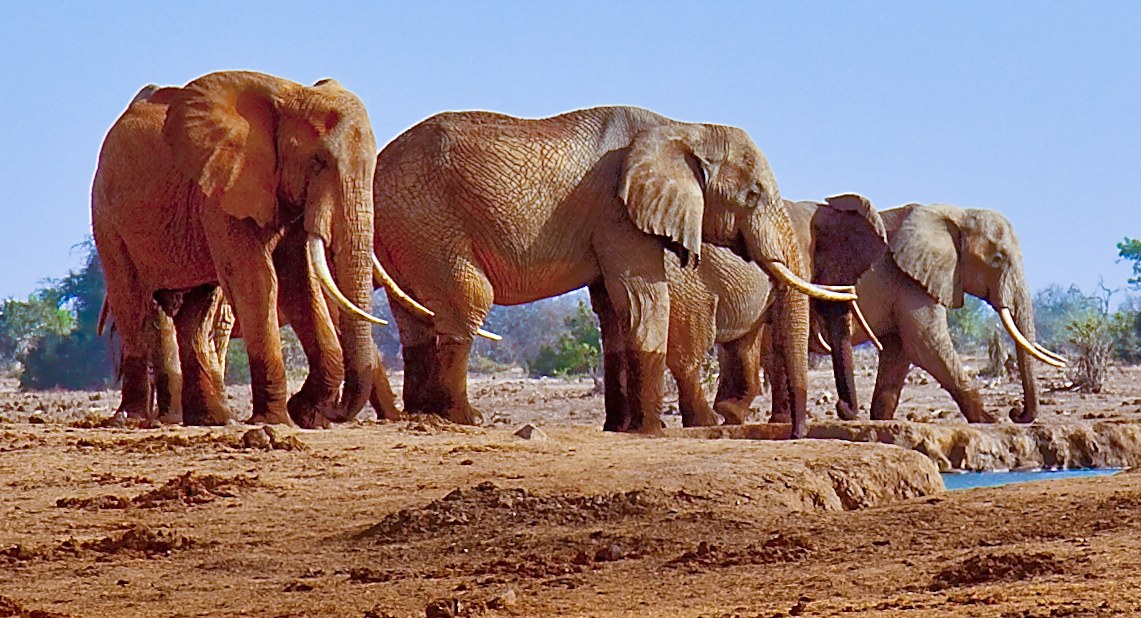
Elephants at a waterhole in Tsavo East National Park in Kenya

Elephant ivory poaching has been a widespread problem in Africa. In 2013, over 20,000 African elephants were killed for their ivory. The slaughter of African elephants is driven by the black market value of elephant ivory. The illicit trade in ivory is primarily in Asia where ivory sells for several thousands of dollars per kilogram. Satao's tusks were estimated to weigh more than 100 pounds (45 kg) each.

Since 2007, the illegal trade in ivory had doubled. While China was the largest market until 2017, the United States, Thailand, Vietnam, and the Philippines are considered to be top markets for illegal ivory. The increase in poaching is driven in large part by organised crime and rebel groups seeking ways to fund insurgencies in Africa.

Due to the great value of his tusks on the black market, Satao had been under nearly constant surveillance by the Kenya Wildlife Service (KWS) and the Tsavo trust for the 18 months prior to June 2014. He typically remained in a small area of the park, but had started roaming into areas of the park where poaching was high. Since he roamed within a large 390-square-mile area (1,000 km^{2}), dangerous to monitor due to thick vegetation which helped enable constant poaching attempts driven by organised crime and rebel militias, the KWS and the Tsavo Trust could not prevent poachers from reaching Satao.

Satao was featured in the Apple TV+ original The Elephant Queen. However, during filming of the documentary, Satao was killed by the poachers.

== Death ==
In March 2014, Satao was found with two seeping wounds in his flank from poisoned arrows shot into him, which were confirmed by veterinarians who rushed to the scene to treat him. After a number of days, Satao recovered from his wounds. Satao was last spotted alive on 19 May 2014.

On 2 June 2014, Richard Moller of the Tsavo Trust found a huge elephant carcass lying in a swamp near the boundary of Tsavo East National Park. The tusks had been cut off, and the face was badly mutilated, so the carcass could not be identified with certainty at that time. For about 10 days, Moller and the Kenya Wildlife Service had searched for Satao before concluding that he was dead. He was killed by a poisoned arrow shot deep into his left flank on or around 30 May 2014.

Satao was officially declared dead on 13 June 2014, and the Tsavo Trust released the following statement announcing his death:

It is with enormous regret that we confirm there is no doubt that Satao is dead, killed by an ivory poacher's poisoned arrow to feed the seemingly insatiable demand for ivory in far off countries. A great life lost so that someone far away can have a trinket on their mantlepiece. Rest in peace, Old Friend, you will be missed.

Illegal ivory was commonly poached and long sold by terrorist organizations to China, which had the largest market for ivory in the world until 31 December 2017, when it banned the elephant ivory trade within its borders.

== Arrests ==
On 20 June 2014, Kenya Wildlife Services reported that service rangers arrested three suspects for killing Satao. Paul Muya, a spokesperson for the Kenya Wildlife Service, said that they were tracked down based on intelligence the Service had acquired.

== Public response ==
The death of Satao resulted in a public outpouring of support for policy to reduce poaching. In New Orleans, a TV Show was created named "AWE for Awesome Wildlife Effort" to interview artists, such as Anne London, on educating the public regarding endangered species. A unit called "The Great Tuskers of AWE" was created to march in Mardi Gras parades with a large fiberglass elephant float and The Krewe of Tusk and Horn marched on World Animal Day in the French Quarter. In neighboring Kenner, Louisiana, a 16-foot-tall elephant sculpture was erected.

== Satao 2 or Satao II ==
Another supertusker, named Satao 2 or Satao II, was killed in 2017, leaving six surviving supertuskers. Satao 2/Satao II's tusks were, however, intact, as the poachers did not have the chance to take them.

== See also ==
- Killing of Cecil the lion
- Elephant hunting in Kenya
- List of individual elephants
- Isilo (elephant)
