= Conservation International Kenya =

Country programme of Conservation International in Kenya

- Abbreviation: CI Kenya
- Formation: 2014
- Type: Country programme
- Headquarters: Nairobi, Kenya
- Region served: Kenya
- Parent organization: Conservation International
- Website: www.conservation.org/places/kenya

Conservation International Kenya (CI Kenya) is the Kenya country programme of Conservation International.

The programme's work includes forest and rangeland conservation and restoration, ecotourism, and climate-mitigation activities such as REDD+.

Its work includes programmes in the Chyulu Hills and Greater Maasai Mara landscapes, mangrove and seagrass conservation partnerships along the Kenyan coast, and a collaborative fisheries-restocking effort at Lake Victoria.

== Overview ==
CI Kenya is based in Nairobi.

The programme's work in Kenya spans nearly 4.9 million hectares in northern and southern Kenya. Major landscapes and programme areas include community-based rangeland restoration in the Chyulu Hills and support for wildlife conservancies in the Greater Maasai Mara.

National-level work has included stakeholder engagement around Kenya's REDD+ policy discussions and Global Environment Facility (GEF) programming on climate transparency. Other activities have included mangrove and seagrass conservation partnerships on the Kenyan coast and native tilapia restocking at Lake Victoria.

== History ==
Conservation International Kenya was founded in 2014.

By the mid-2010s, Conservation International supported stakeholder-engagement activities around Kenya's REDD+ policy discussions and participated in Global Environment Facility (GEF) programming in Kenya, including climate-transparency work linked to the Paris Agreement and regional experience-sharing in East Africa.

In 2017, the Chyulu Hills Carbon Project launched in the Chyulu Hills landscape with partners including the Maasai Wilderness Conservation Trust.

During the tourism downturn linked to the COVID-19 pandemic, Conservation International and partners established the Maasai Mara Rescue Fund to help wildlife conservancies cover lease payments to landowners and reduce pressure for land conversion.

In 2021, Apple and Conservation International partnered with local conservation organisations in Kenya on savanna restoration in the Chyulu Hills region through the "Restore Fund".

In 2024, S&P Global Commodity Insights was selected by Conservation International, on behalf of the Government of Kenya, to develop a national REDD+ project registry.

In 2024 and 2025, Conservation International was among the organisations involved in establishing the Kenya chapter of the Global Mangrove Alliance for mangrove and seagrass conservation along the Kenyan coast.

== Programmes and operations ==
Selected programme locations in Kenya (1 Nairobi, 2 Chyulu Hills landscape, 3 Greater Maasai Mara, 4 Kilifi (Kenyan coast), 5 Suba South (Lake Victoria))

=== National programmes ===
National-level work has included stakeholder-engagement activities around Kenya's REDD+ policy discussions. These were implemented by the International Union for Conservation of Nature (IUCN) and the East African Wildlife Society, with support from Conservation International and the U.S. Department of State.

Conservation International has also served as an agency for Global Environment Facility (GEF) programming in Kenya. A 2016 GEF project identification form for a Capacity-building Initiative for Transparency (CBIT) project in Kenya set the objective of enhancing Kenya's institutional and technical capacity for transparency under the Paris Agreement, including strengthening a land-based emissions estimation system, and a 2017 report to the United Nations Framework Convention on Climate Change (UNFCCC) summarised the project and regional experience-sharing in East Africa. Conservation International is also listed as the lead agency for the GEF project Advancing human-wildlife conflict management effectiveness in Kenya through an integrated approach, and Kenyan government documents covered preparation and validation of project documentation for that project.

=== Chyulu Hills landscape ===
CI Kenya's work in the Chyulu Hills landscape in Makueni County has included community-based rangeland restoration aimed at climate resilience and pastoral livelihoods.

==== Chyulu Hills Carbon Project (REDD+) ====
The Chyulu Hills Carbon Project is a forest carbon project in the Chyulu Hills landscape, launched in 2017 with partners including the Maasai Wilderness Conservation Trust. "Pre-REDD" activities began in 2010.

The project's proponent is the Chyulu Hills Conservation Trust, a partnership involving government agencies, local NGOs and Maasai group ranches, with support from Conservation International. A 2025 working paper on nature-based solutions and carbon credit initiatives in Kenya described the project as having been designed as an avoided-deforestation project.

==== Savanna and rangeland restoration (Apple-supported) ====
In 2021, Apple and Conservation International partnered with local conservation organisations in Kenya to restore degraded savannas in the Chyulu Hills region as part of the "Restore Fund". A 2025 working paper on nature-based solutions and carbon credit initiatives in Kenya stated that, with recent Apple funding, the Chyulu Hills REDD+ Project had initiated ecosystem restoration activities and rotational grazing schemes. Community-based rangeland restoration in the landscape has been described as supporting climate resilience and pastoral livelihoods.

=== Greater Maasai Mara region ===
In the Greater Maasai Mara, CI Kenya's work included helping to establish the Maasai Mara Rescue Fund with the Maasai Mara Wildlife Conservancies Association during the tourism collapse linked to the COVID-19 pandemic. The fund was structured as a loan programme intended to help conservancies cover lease payments owed to landowners and reduce pressure for land conversion in the ecosystem.

=== Kenyan coast (mangrove and seagrass conservation) ===
==== Global Mangrove Alliance Kenya chapter ====
A memorandum of understanding (MoU) signed by five conservation organisations in Kenya established a collaboration intended to protect and restore mangrove forests and seagrass along the Kenyan coast. Signatories included Conservation International, IUCN, The Nature Conservancy, Wetlands International Eastern Africa, and WWF-Kenya. The MoU launched the Global Mangrove Alliance (GMA) Kenya Chapter in Kilifi on the sidelines of National Mangrove Dialogue 2025 and outlined a five-year strategy for the chapter with themes including capacity building, science and monitoring, chapter development, innovative finance, and communications.

In 2024, the chapter followed a stakeholder meeting in Mombasa and was linked to a broader goal of increasing mangrove cover by 20% by 2030, with support from the "Save Our Mangroves Now!" project funded by Germany's BMZ through WWF-Germany. Participating organisations described the chapter as a framework for coordinating mangrove and seagrass conservation work along the Kenyan coast.

A status overview of coastal and marine data and information management in Kenya listed Conservation International (Kenya) among non-state stakeholders involved in coastal and marine data and information management.

=== Lake Victoria (Homa Bay County) ===
At Lake Victoria, CI Kenya has participated in freshwater-conservation work focused on recovering native fish species in Homa Bay County. Reporting on the 2023 launch of a restocking effort said Conservation International worked with Victory Farms and the Kenya Marine and Fisheries Research Institute (KMFRI), while Conservation International's role included identifying fish-breeding sites and KMFRI's role included research support on fish production. The reintroduction of Oreochromis esculentus began at Rowo Beach in Suba South, with additional releases planned at Gingo, Wakula and Wadiang'a beaches.

A 2024 final report on related Lake Victoria work described a model linking sustainable aquaculture with community conservation areas in Roo and Ukula. It reported that 1,137 hectares were delineated into riparian, fish-breeding and fishing zones, and that 75,000 native tilapia fingerlings were restocked in the aquatic conservation areas.

A 2026 feature on women's fisheries programmes in western Kenya described the same initiative as bringing together Pathfinder International, Conservation International, Victory Farms and Fauna & Flora. It said the project distributed boats and nets to women's groups in Homa Bay, provided entrepreneurship training, established protected breeding zones and, by mid-2024, had supported 20 women's groups in Suba South in sustainable fish cage farming.

Selected programme landscapes and activity contexts of Conservation International Kenya
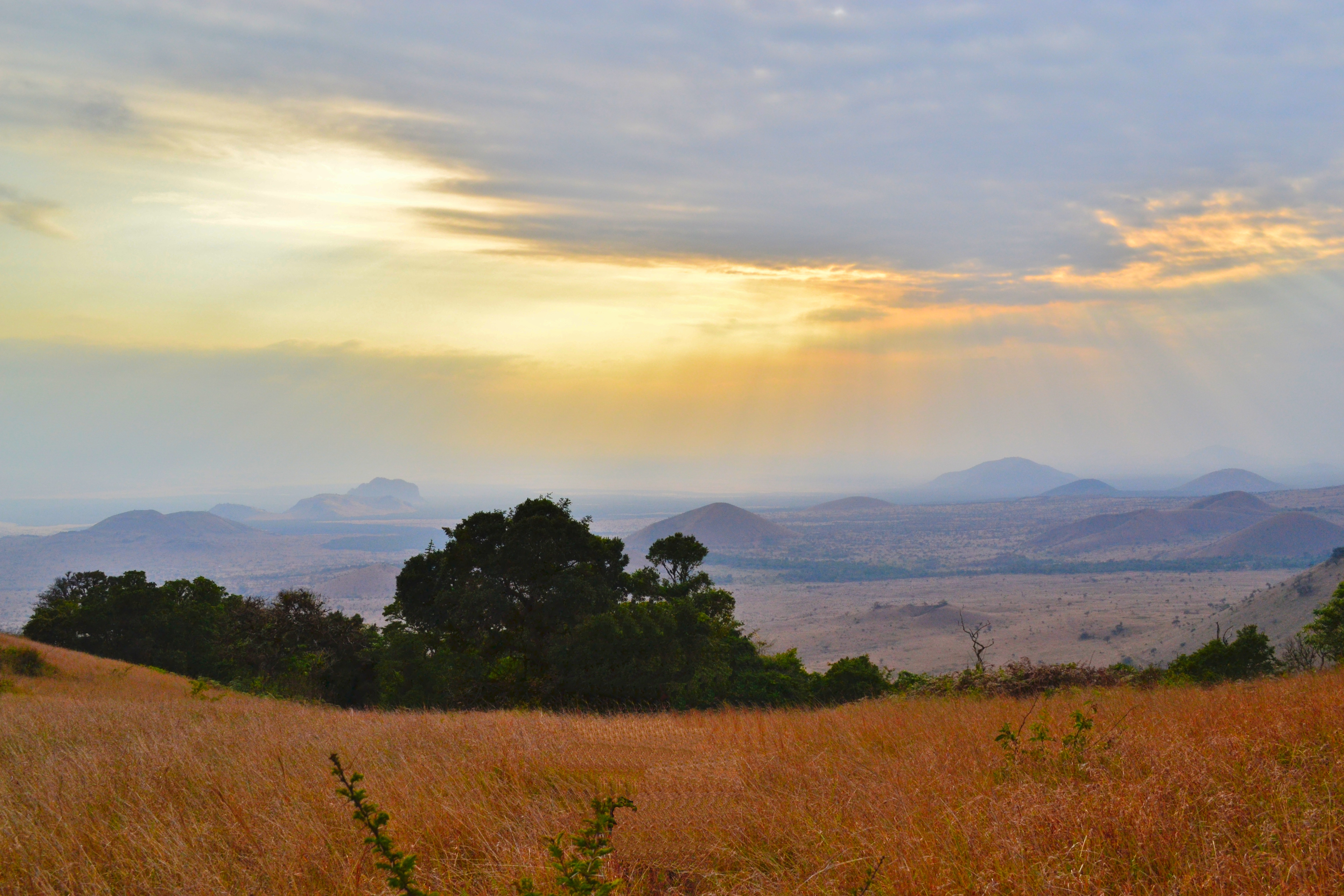
Chyulu Hills, where CI Kenya has supported rangeland restoration and forest-carbon work

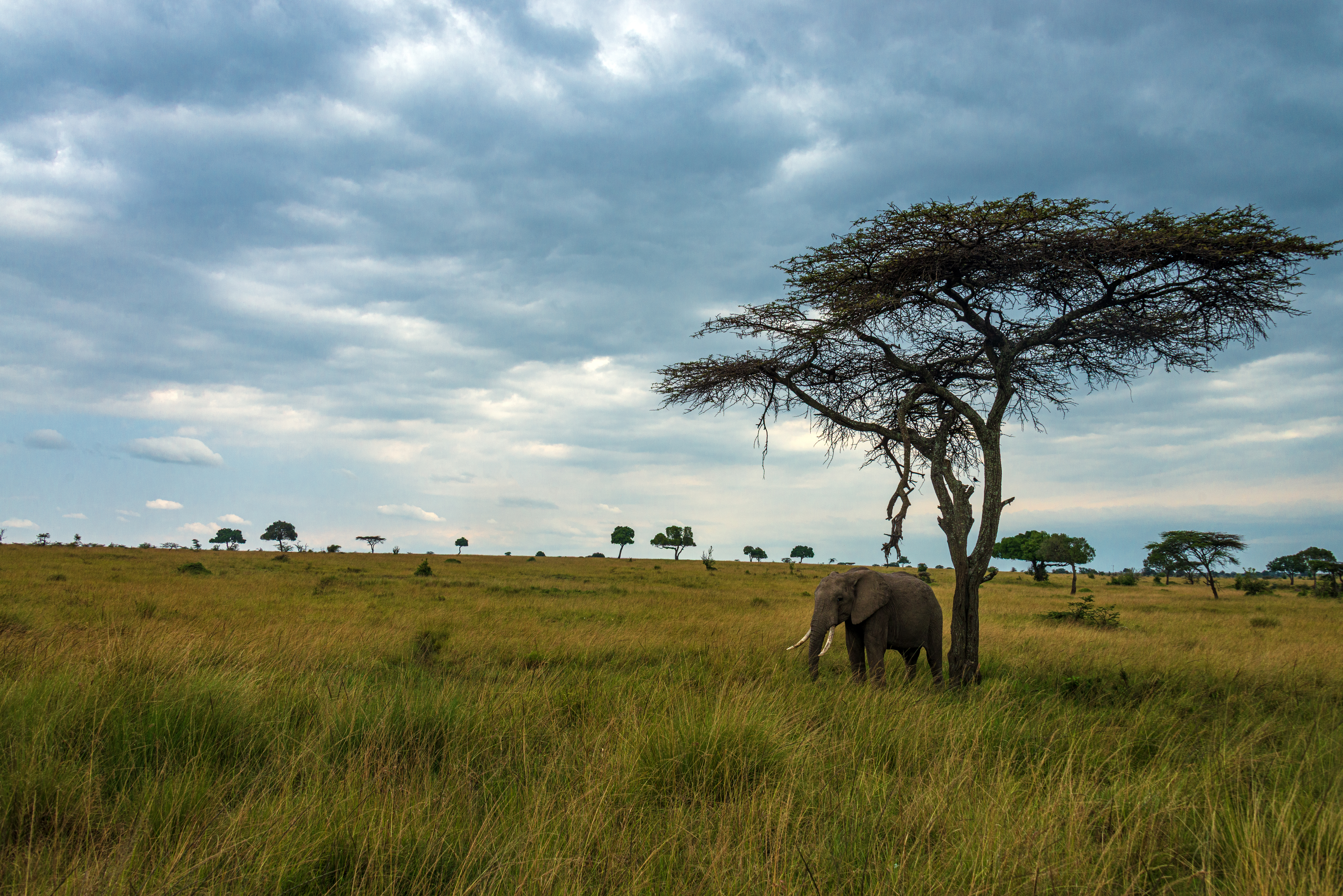
Elephant in Mara North Conservancy, part of the Greater Maasai Mara ecosystem

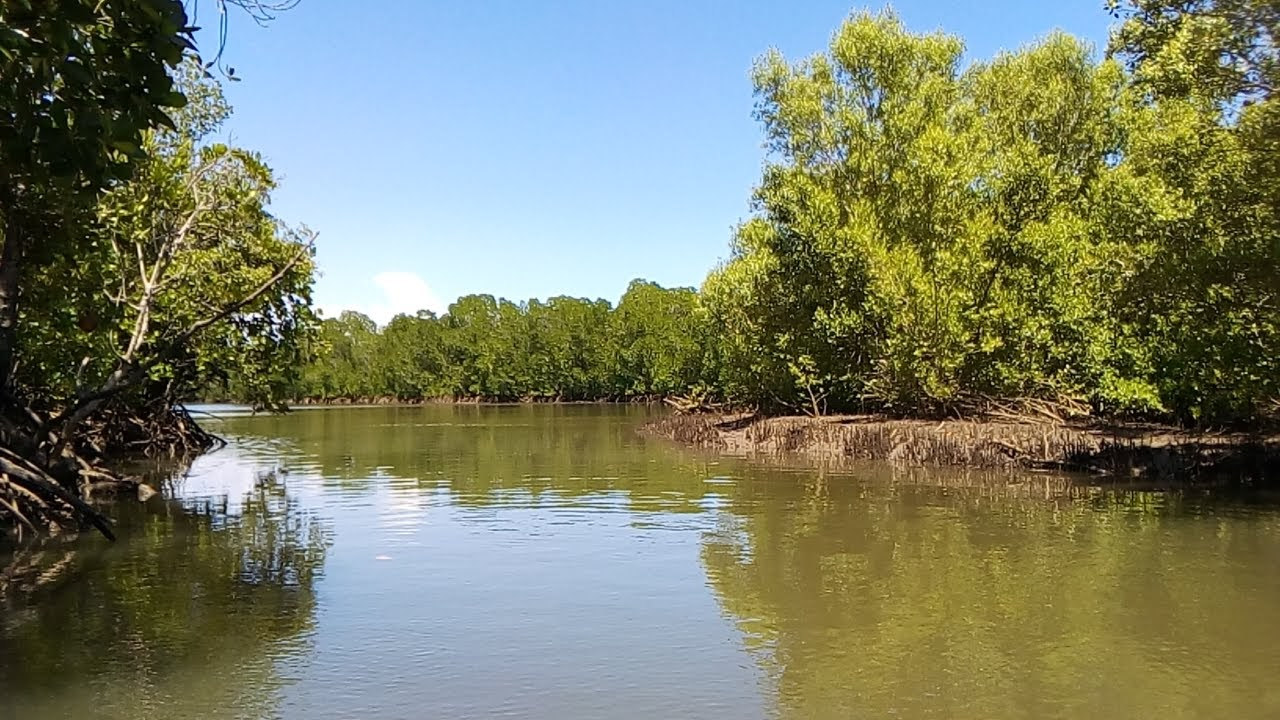
Mangrove creek at Robinson Island, Kilifi County, on the Kenyan coast

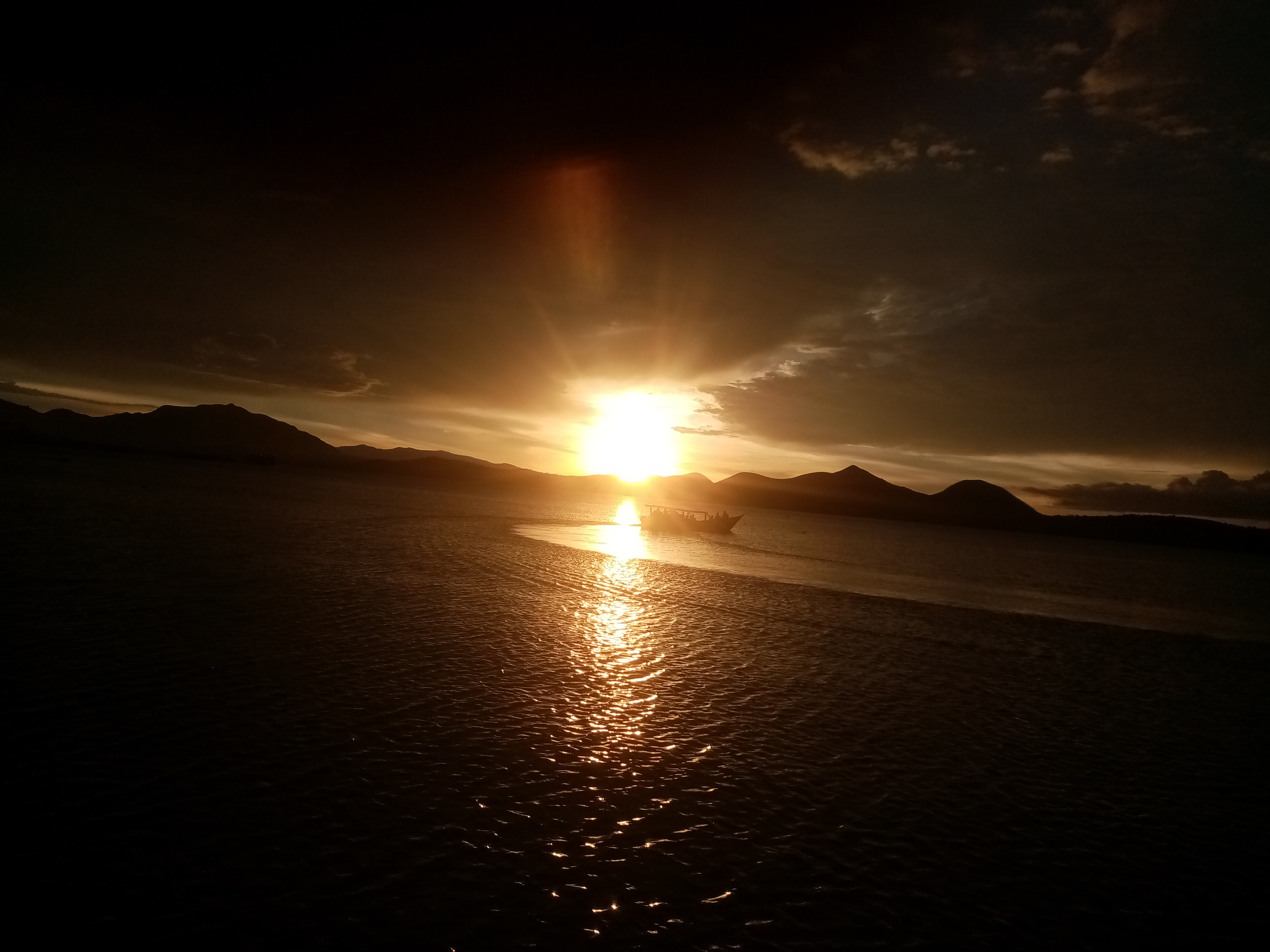
Lake Victoria in Homa Bay County, where CI Kenya has participated in native fish recovery work

== Partnerships ==
Conservation International Kenya's work has involved partnerships with conservation organisations, community institutions, research bodies, and public agencies. In national programmes, stakeholder-engagement work around REDD+ policy discussions involved the IUCN and the East African Wildlife Society, while GEF-linked projects involved Kenyan government ministries and agencies.

Landscape programmes also involved clearly named conservation partners. In the Chyulu Hills, the carbon project involved the Maasai Wilderness Conservation Trust and the Chyulu Hills Conservation Trust, while the Greater Maasai Mara Rescue Fund was established with the Maasai Mara Wildlife Conservancies Association.

Coastal and freshwater programmes involved additional partner organisations. On the Kenyan coast, the Global Mangrove Alliance Kenya chapter involved IUCN, The Nature Conservancy, Wetlands International Eastern Africa and WWF-Kenya. At Lake Victoria, native fish recovery and related community-conservation work involved Victory Farms, the Kenya Marine and Fisheries Research Institute (KMFRI), Fauna & Flora and Pathfinder International.

== Funding and conservation finance ==
Carbon-finance activities in Kenya have included the Chyulu Hills Carbon Project, a forest carbon project in the Chyulu Hills landscape. Verified credits had been issued for multiple monitoring periods under a voluntary carbon standard registry, and a 2024 profile described carbon-credit revenue as helping fund conservation and community programmes in the landscape.

In 2021, Apple and Conservation International launched the first US$200 million Restore Fund and partnered with local conservation organisations in Kenya on savanna restoration in the Chyulu Hills region. A 2025 working paper stated that recent Apple funding in the landscape supported ecosystem restoration activities and rotational grazing schemes.

During the tourism downturn linked to the COVID-19 pandemic, the Maasai Mara Rescue Fund operated as a loan programme intended to help wildlife conservancies cover lease payments to landowners and reduce pressure for land conversion. AFAR described it as a US$5 million bridge loan, with repayment expected from future tourism income and conservation fees, while replacement grant funding was reported to have helped maintain wildlife patrols and household income continuity.

Conservation International has also served as an agency or lead agency for GEF-backed project finance in Kenya. This has included the Capacity-building Initiative for Transparency project on climate-transparency systems and a GEF project on human-wildlife conflict management effectiveness.

In 2024, S&P Global Commodity Insights was selected by Conservation International, on behalf of the Government of Kenya, to develop a national REDD+ project registry intended to track the lifecycle of credits from interventions aimed at reducing emissions from deforestation and forest degradation and related forest activities. S&P Global stated that the registry was due to be operational by the second quarter of 2025.

== Impact and evaluation ==
A 2023 chapter on community-based rangeland restoration in the Chyulu landscape reported that assessment work in three Maasai community-managed group ranches found 27.72% of sites degraded and concluded that multi-stakeholder restoration could generate socio-economic and ecological benefits. The chapter stated that 8,328 hectares had been restored by June 2022 and recommended replication of the approach and its incorporation into natural-resource-management policy.

A 2025 peer-reviewed study of Chyulu Hills reported that, in surveys covering 1,567 households over 16 months, larger restored areas were associated with fewer human-wildlife and social conflicts. The study found an overall decrease in social conflicts and feelings of insecurity over time, but did not find a corresponding overall decrease in human-wildlife conflicts, and it recommended longer-term tracking together with greater attention to women's experiences in conflict-mitigation strategies.

A 2024 final report on related Lake Victoria work stated that the project established 1,137 hectares of aquatic community conservation areas in Roo and Ukula and restocked them with 75,000 native tilapia fingerlings. The report also stated that participating households reported greater representation in conservation-area planning and management, and that women-led groups indicated declines in the "sex-for-fish" practice during the project period, while wider replication was linked to financing and continued institutional support.

== Reception ==
The Chyulu Hills Carbon Project has been referenced in litigation challenging Apple's "carbon neutral" marketing for certain Apple Watch models. In a U.S. federal lawsuit filed in 2025, plaintiffs alleged that offset projects used to support those claims, including the Chyulu Hills project, did not provide real carbon reductions; Apple disputed the allegations in a statement quoted in reporting.

In a separate case in Germany, a Frankfurt regional court barred Apple from advertising an Apple Watch as a "CO2-neutral product". Reuters reported that the court found consumers had been misled.
