= James Currie (birding expert) =

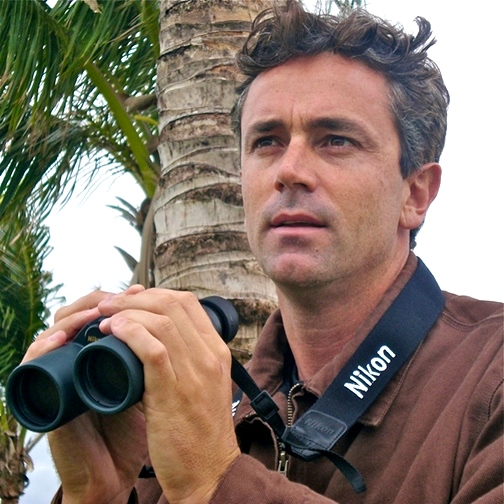
- Currie in Lake Worth, Florida, 2012.
- Born: April 9, 1972 (age 54); Cape Town, South Africa
- Education: University of Cape Town; Middlesex University
- Occupations: Creator, host & producer: Nikon's Birding Adventures TV; Aerial Assassins
- Years active: 2009-present
- Website: birdingadventures.com

James Currie (born April 9, 1972) is a birding expert, conservation advocate, and host of Nikon’s Birding Adventures TV and Nat Geo Wild’s Aerial Assassins.

== Early life ==
Currie was born and raised in Cape Town, South Africa. His parents owned and ran the restaurant at Kirstenbosch Botanical Gardens on Table Mountain. Currie started birdwatching around the age of seven, becoming enamored of the power and beauty of birds after witnessing a black eagle swoop down and grab a rock hyrax right in front of him. He holds a Bachelor’s degree in African languages (he speaks Xhosa, Zulu and Afrikaans) from the University of Cape Town; a Master of Science in Environmental Management from Middlesex University; and worked for over a decade in Africa as a wildlife and birding tour guide. From 2004 to 2007, Currie was the managing director of the Africa Foundation, a nonprofit working to protect rural lands across Africa.

== Television ==
=== Birding Adventures TV ===
Currie created, produces and hosts Birding Adventures TV. The show, sponsored by Nikon, debuted in 2009 and was initially broadcast regionally on Fox Sports Net Florida and Comcast Southeast. In 2012, the show aired nationally on NBC Sports Network. The show also airs on CarbonTV. It focuses on rare and unusual birds, “the adventure of birding, the new smells, new bird calls, new wildlife and amazing cultures,” and emphasizes the importance of bird and wildlife habitat preservation. Going against stereotype, Birding Adventures showcases birding as an active sport, rather than a passive one. Episodes have been filmed around Florida and in exotic locations such as Ecuador, Dominican Republic, Costa Rica, Jamaica, Australia and the Andes Mountains. There are 13 episodes per season.

=== Aerial Assassins ===
In keeping with his philosophy of birding as an active sport, as host of Aerial Assassins on Nat Geo Wild, Currie follows packs of the unpredictable Harris's hawks hunting in the Sonoran Desert in Arizona. The show premiered on January 20, 2012.

== Books and other media ==
Currie consulted on and provided footage for the 2011 film The Big Year, a comedy about a bird-spotting competition, starring Steve Martin, Jack Black and Owen Wilson. In 2012, he produced a four-part series on the birds of Botswana for the Botswana Tourism Organization. He contributes to the American Birding Association’s blog.

Currie produced a 24-part series of lectures about birding for the Teaching Company’s The Great Courses titled The National Geographic Guide to Birding in North America.

In 2014, Currie published his memoir When Eagles Roar: The Amazing Journey of an African Wildlife Adventurer ISBN 0990766004.

In 2016, Currie launched a Kickstarter campaign to film Last of the Big Tuskers, a documentary inspired by the death of Isilo, the largest tusker in the Southern Hemisphere. Currie traveled throughout South Africa and Kenya to film the largest elephants on Earth and document what is being done to ensure their survival. The documentary was released in 2018.

== Personal life ==
Currie and his wife Rebecca have three children. They have lived in Lake Worth Beach, Florida, since 2007.
