= Mau-Mau Cave =

Coordinates: 0°18′40″S 36°57′46″E

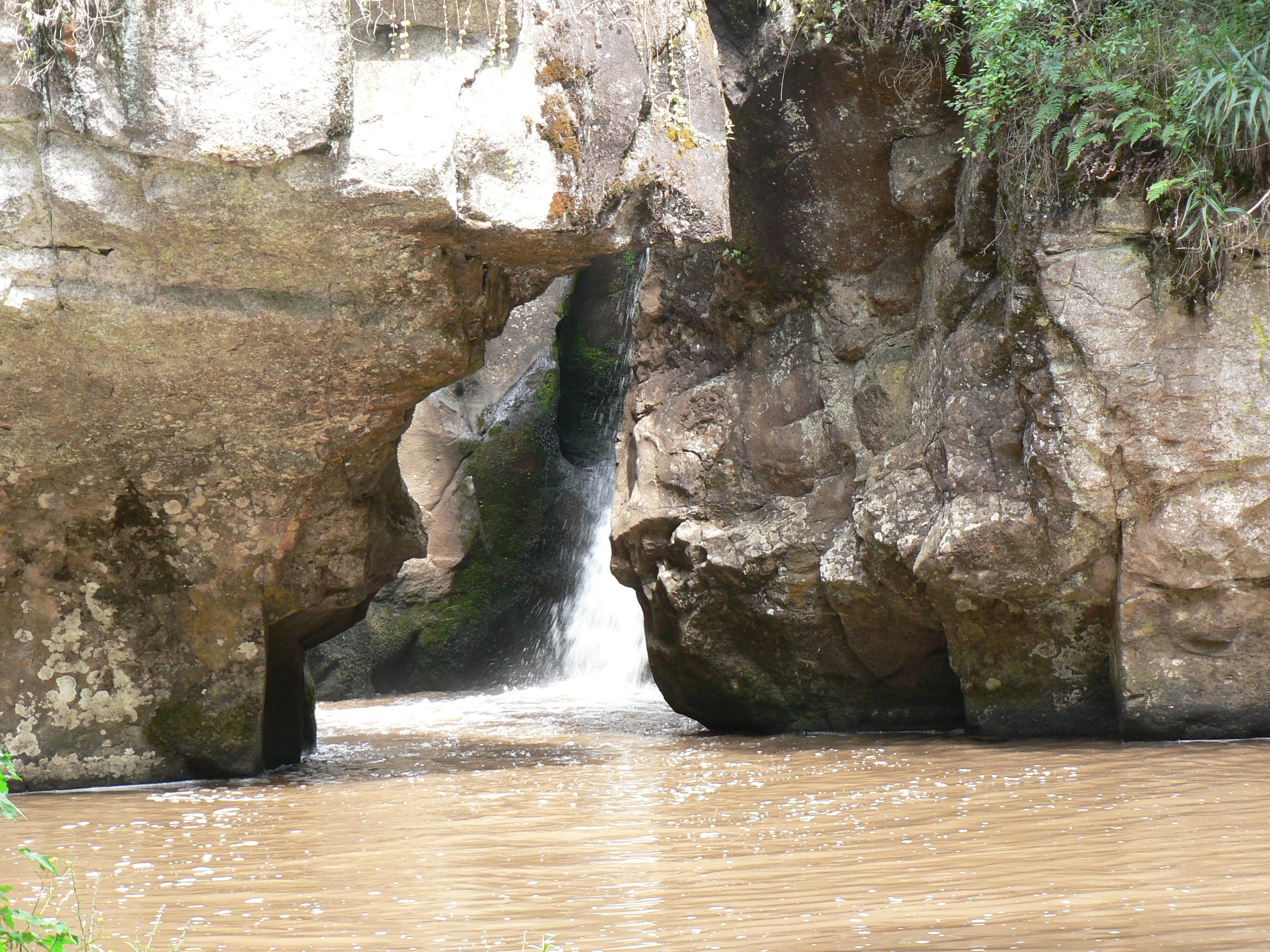
Entrance to the cave

Located near Nanyuki, about 199.2 km North East of Nairobi in Kenya's Central Province, the Mau Mau Cave was used as a hide-out by Kenyan Freedom Fighters during the Mau Mau Uprising of 1952 to 1960. It is located approximately 18 km south of the equator inside the thick Mount Kenya National Park.

== History ==
The cave was discovered in 1953 by the Mau Mau freedom fighters fighting the British colonial government soon after the declaration of the State of Emergency in 1952. It was bombed by British forces in 1959 after the location was obtained from a member of the Land and Freedom Army. Approximately 200 people lost their lives in the cave during the bombardment, and their remains can still be seen amongst the rubble. It was gazetted in 2003 by the Museums of Kenya and declared a national monument.
