= Tsavo =

Region of Kenya

Coordinates: 02°58′00″S 38°28′00″E

Tsavo is a region of Kenya located where the Uganda Railway crosses the Tsavo River, close to where it meets the Athi-Galana-Sabaki River. Two national parks, Tsavo East and Tsavo West are located in the area.

The meaning of the word Tsavo is unclear, but because of tribal conflicts, the Kamba people used to refer to the region as the place of "slaughter". Until the British put an end to the slave trade in the early 19th century, Tsavo had been continually crossed by caravans of slavers and their captives.

== Flora and fauna ==
Typical flora of the region includes:

- Acacia
- Myrrh
- Baobab

Typical fauna of the region includes:

- African bush elephant
- Giraffe
- African buffalo
- Gazelle
- Klipspringer
- Kudu
- Leopard
- Lion
- Cheetah

== See also ==
- Railway stations in Kenya
- Tsavorite
- Tsavo East National Park
- Tsavo West National Park
