= Mzima Springs =

Natural springs in Kenya

Coordinates: 2°59′S 38°1.3′E

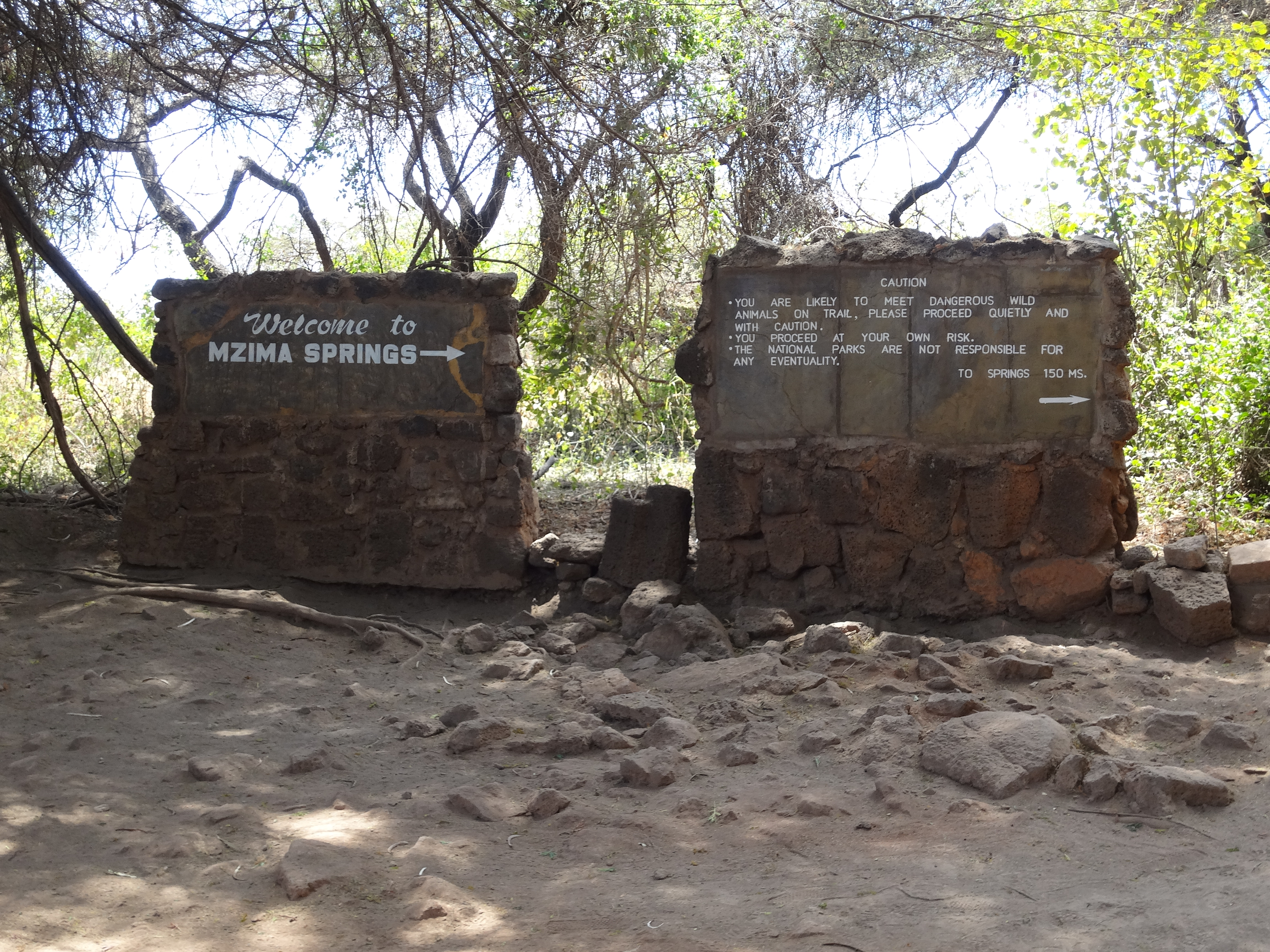
Entrance sign at Mzima Springs hike

Mzima Springs are a series of four natural springs in Tsavo National Park, Kenya. They are located in the west of the Park, around 48 km from Mtito Andei. The source of the springs is a natural reservoir under the Chyulu Hills to the north. The Chyulu range is composed of volcanic lava rock and ash, which is too porous to allow rivers to flow. Instead, rain water percolates through the rock, and may spend 25 years underground before emerging 50 kilometres away at Mzima. The natural filtration process gives rise to Mzima's famously clear stream, which flows through a series of pools and rapids. Two kilometres downstream from the springs, the stream is blocked by a solidified lava flow and disappears below the surface again.

Mzima is one of Tsavo's most popular wildlife attractions owing to its resident populations of hippos and Nile crocodiles. Mzima's isolation makes both species dependent on its waters: other sources are too distant for them to reach by overland travel. The hippos also sustain an entire food chain. They browse the surrounding savannah by night and return to Mzima's pools by day, where their dung fertilises the water. Fruiting trees such as date and raffia palms, waterberries and figs grow beside the water, using their submerged roots to absorb nutrients. Their fruits are a source of food for vervet monkeys and a variety of birds. Below the water's surface, the invertebrates which feed on the hippo dung are preyed on by fish and cormorants.

The springs were made famous by wildlife film-makers Alan and Joan Root's 1969 nature documentary Mzima: Portrait of a Spring, which featured underwater footage of the hippos and crocodiles. They were also the subject of the Survival Special Mzima: Haunt of the Riverhorse in 2003, which featured the first footage of a hippo infanticide.

In 2009, a prolonged drought proved catastrophic for Mzima's wildlife. Starving game animals were driven to permanent water sources in their thousands, bringing them into competition with the resident hippos. The grassland surrounding the spring turned to desert and hippos began starving to death. In September 2009, only five remained, down from 70 in 2003, and journalists reported seeing carcasses floating in the pools.

== Source of Coast Water ==
Mzima Springs, Marere, and Tiwi in Kwale County are the other sources of water (after Baaricho which supplies 90 million litres per day). They supply 20,000 m3 a day to Voi, Mariakani, and the South Coast.
