= Tsavo River =

River in Kenya

Coordinates: 2°58′39″S 38°31′14″E

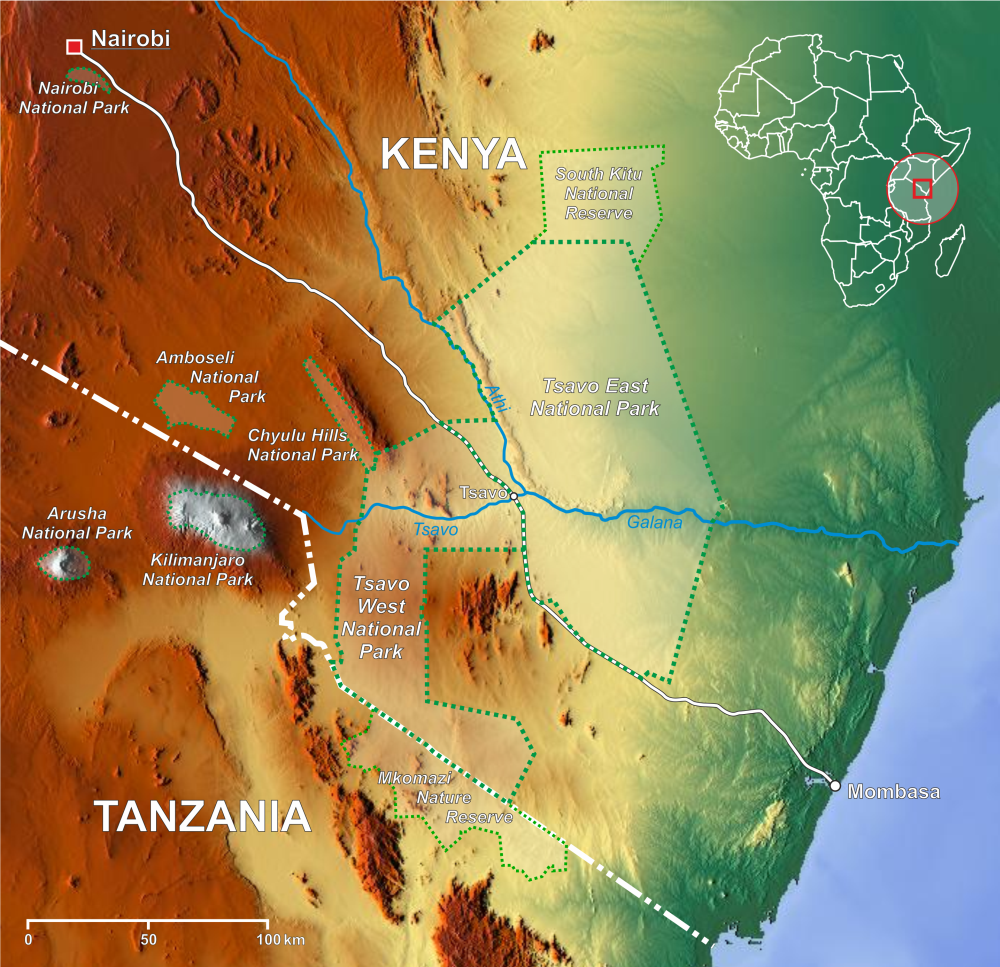
Tsavo River and Tsavo National Parks

The Tsavo River is located in the Coast Province in Kenya. It runs east from the western end of the Tsavo West National Park of Kenya, near the border of Tanzania, until it joins with the Athi River, forming the Galana River near the center of the park. This river is the main contributor to the watershed of the lower portion of the park region, and is home to abundant fish. The Tsavo River is the site of the 1898 Tsavo Maneaters incident.

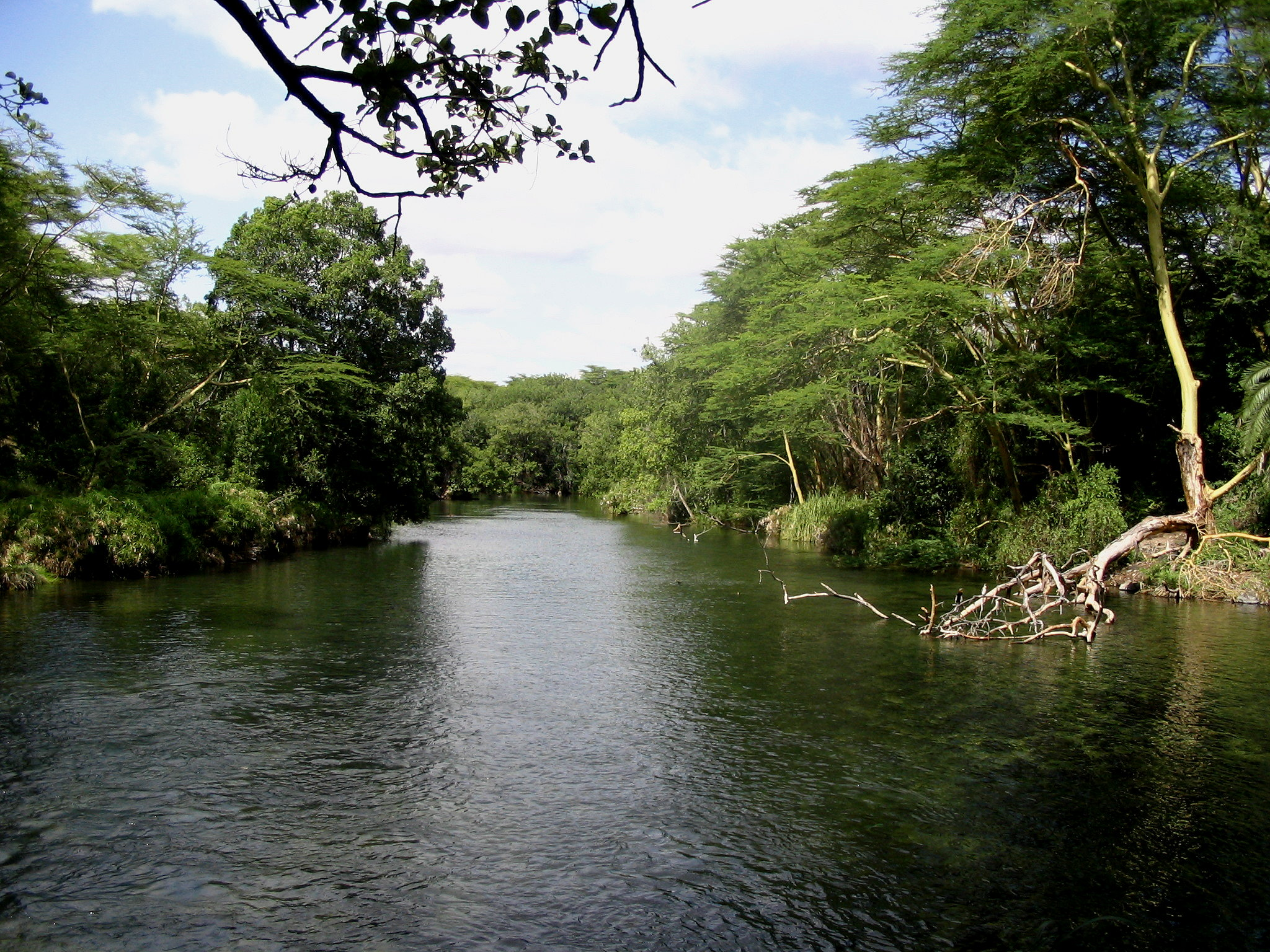
View of the Tsavo River in Tsavo West National Park

== See also ==
- Tsavo Man-Eaters
- Tsavo
