= Athi-Galana-Sabaki River =

River in Kenya

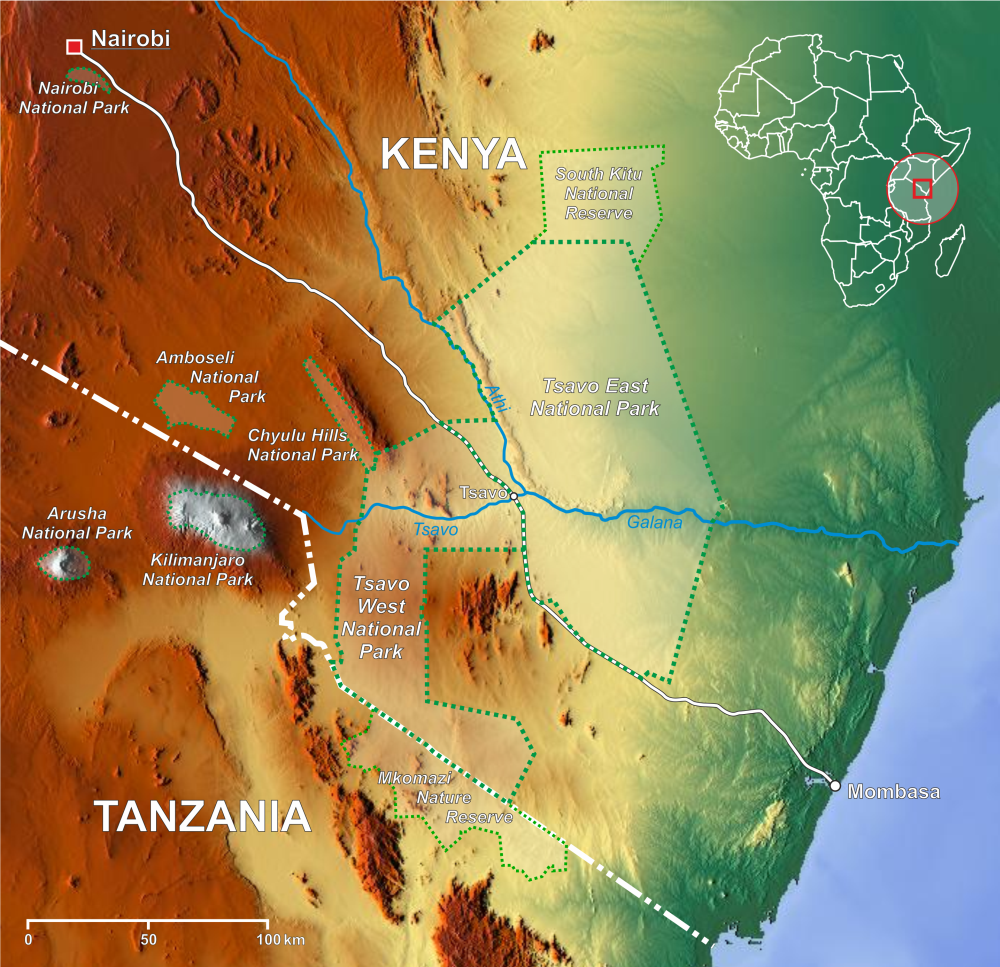
Athi-Galana-Sabaki River system.

The Athi-Galana-Sabaki River is the second longest river in Kenya (after the Tana River). It has a total length of 390 kilometres (240 mi) and drains an area of 58,639 square kilometres (22,641 sq mi). The river rises in the Gatamaiyo Forest as the Athi River and enters the Indian Ocean as the Galana River (also known as the Sabaki River).

== Flow ==
The Athi River flows across the Kapote and Athi plains, through Athi River town, and then takes a northeast direction where it is met by the Nairobi River. Near Thika, the river forms the Fourteen Falls and turns south-east under the wooded slopes of the Yatta ridge, which shuts in its basin on the east. Apart from the numerous small feeders of the upper river, the only other tributary is the Tsavo River, from the east side of the Kilimanjaro, which enters at about 3° S. It then turns east, and in its lower course is known as the Sabaki (or Galana) River, which traverses the sterile quartz-land of the outer plateau. The valley is low and flat, covered with forest and scrub, containing small lakes and backwaters connected to the river during the rainy season. During the rainy season, the river rises as much as 10 metres (33 ft) in places, now strongly flowing with a turbid yellow colour, navigation is interrupted by a series of rapids, at the Lugard falls. Flowing east, it enters the Indian Ocean 10 kilometres (6.2 mi) north of Malindi.

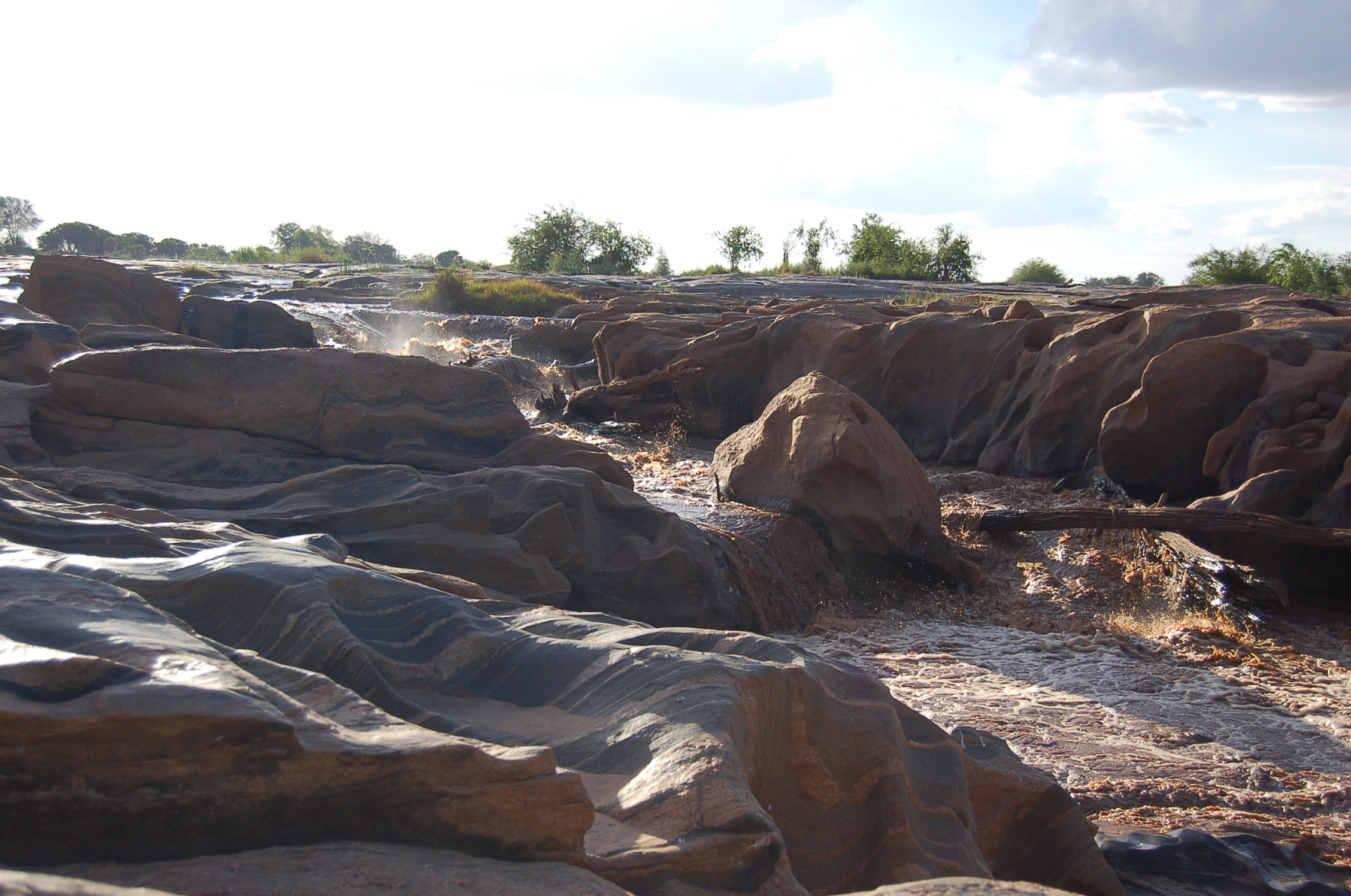
View of the Galana River in Kenya

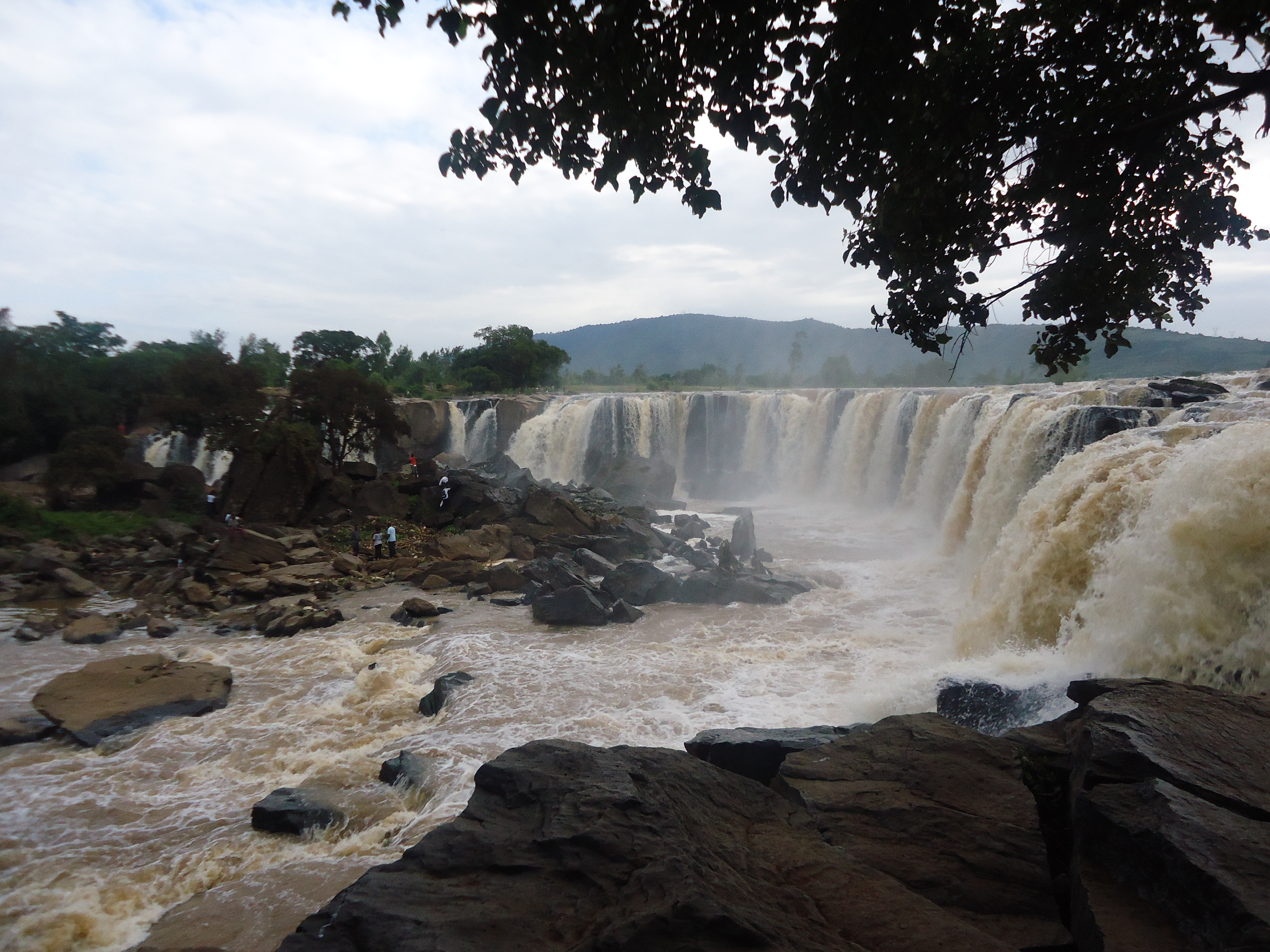
The Fourteen Falls near Thika

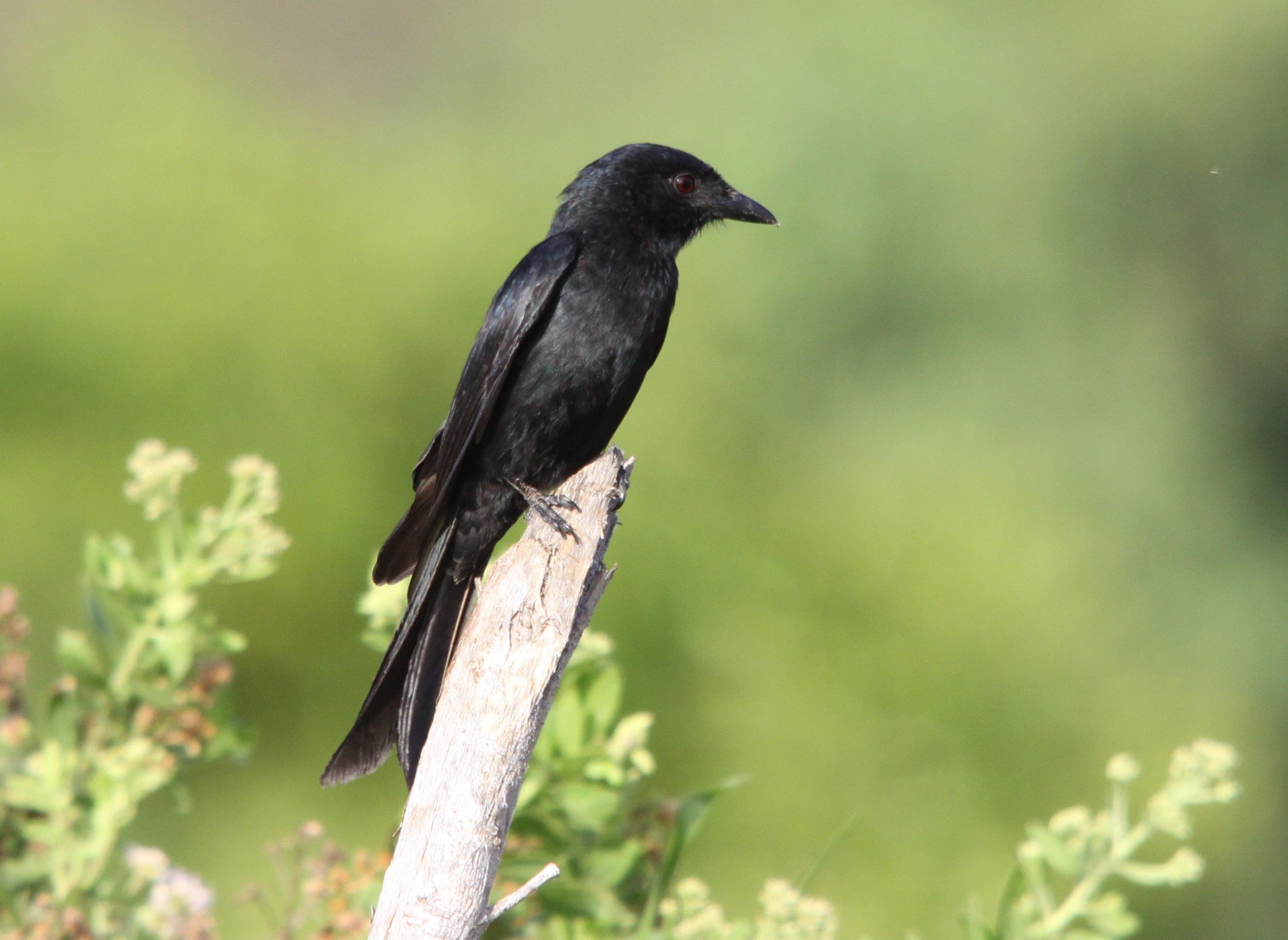
A drongo at Sabaka River

== Wildlife ==
The river flows through the Tsavo East National Park and is hosts diverse fish, as well as hippopotamus, crocodiles, and birds such as African fish eagles. A large portion of Kenyans rely on the river for drinking water and irrigation.

== Development ==
=== Thwake Dam ===
The Thwake Dam or Thwake Multi-purpose Water Development Programme, is a dam complex being built on the Athi River in Kenya. The dam is meant to be a multipurpose dam that provides drinking water, agricultural irrigation water, hydropower, and other water supply infrastructure. Water storage is 688 million cubic metres and is meant for rural homes, Konza and other local jurisdictions. The dam cost KSh. 37 billion and is being built by the China Gezhouba Group Company. The Funding was provided by the African Development Fund.
