= Tsavo West National Park =

National Park in Kenya

- Hifadhi ya Taifa ya Tsavo Magharibi
- IUCN category II (national park)
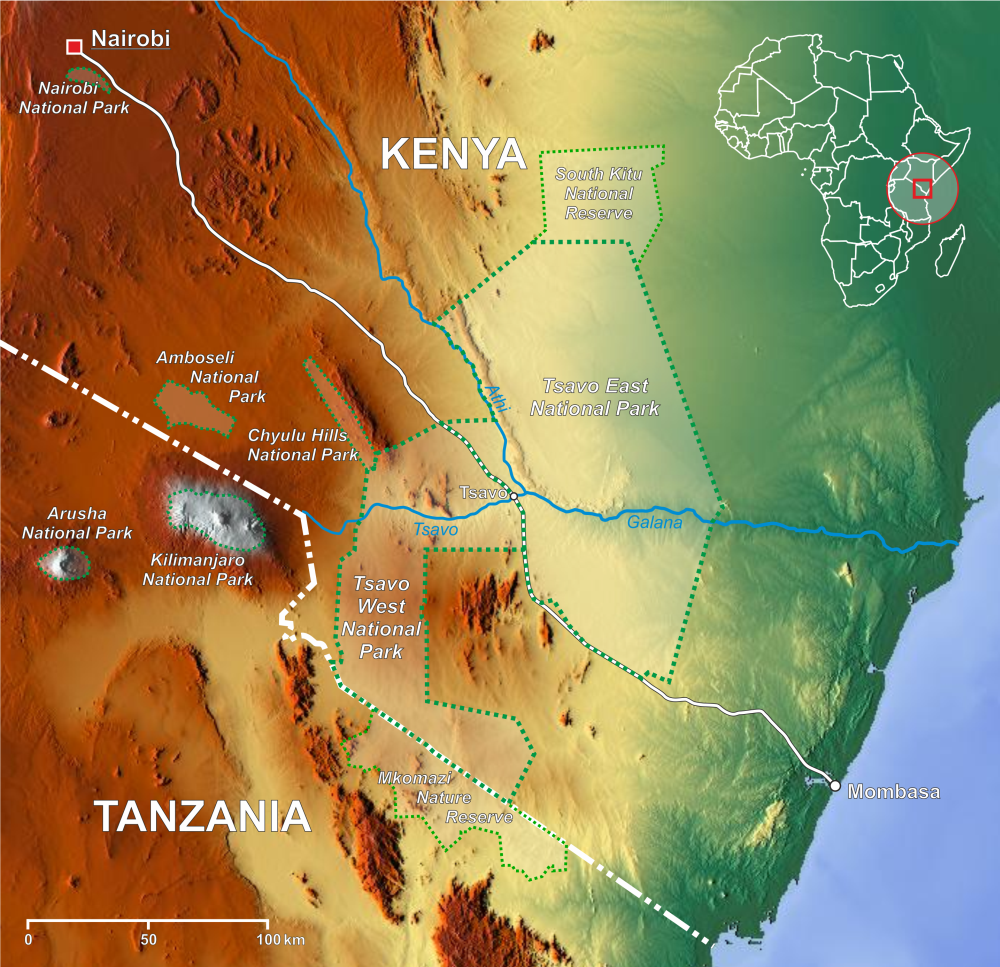
- Location within Tsavo national parks
- Location: Kenya
- Coordinates: 3°23′S 38°0′E
- Area: 9,065 km^{2} (3,500 sq mi)
- Established: 1948
- Governing body: Kenya Wildlife Service

Tsavo West National Park is located in Taita-Taveta County of Kenya. The park covers an area of 9,065 km^{2} (3,500 sq mi). The A109 road Nairobi-Mombasa and a railway divides it from the adjoining Tsavo East National Park. Together with adjoining ranches and protected areas, they comprise the Tsavo Conservation Area. Tsavo West is a more popular destination due to its magnificent scenery and the Mzima Springs, the rich and varied wildlife, a good road system, a rhino reserve, rock climbing potential and guided walks along the Tsavo River. The park is operated by Kenya Wildlife Service.

== Archaeology and history ==
Although a few Early Stone Age and Middle Stone Age archaeological sites are recorded from ground surface finds in Tsavo, there is much evidence for thriving Late Stone Age economy from 6,000 to 1,300 years ago. Research has shown that Late Stone Age archaeological sites are found close to the Galana River in high numbers. The inhabitants of these sites hunted wild animals, fished and kept domesticated animals. Because of the sparse availability of water away from the Galana River, human settlement in Tsavo focused on the riparian areas and in rockshelters as one moves west.

Swahili merchants traded with the inhabitants of Tsavo for ivory, catskins, and probably slaves as early as 700 CE (and probably earlier). There is no evidence for direct Swahili "colonization" of Tsavo. Instead, trade was probably accomplished by moving goods to and from the Swahili Coast via extended kin-networks. Trade goods such as cowry shells and beads have been recovered from archaeological sites dating to the early Swahili period.

19th-century British and German explorers document people we now refer to as Orma and Waata during their travels through the "nyika", and generally viewed them as hostile toward their interests. Beginning in the late 19th century, the British began to colonise the interior of Kenya and built the Uganda Railway through Tsavo in 1898. The construction of the railway was noted for the deaths of a number of construction workers in 1898 by a pair of maneless male lions, during the building of a bridge across the Tsavo River. Hunting mainly at night, they stalked and killed at least 28 Indian and African workers – although some accounts put the number of victims as high as 135. The lions, dubbed "the Maneaters of Tsavo", were eventually shot and killed by the bridge construction supervisor, Lt.-Col. John Henry Patterson who later wrote a book about this experience called The Man-eaters of Tsavo (1907). The skins and skulls of these lions are now displayed in the Field Museum of Natural History in Chicago.

Tsavo remained the homeland for the Orma and Maasai pastoralists and Waata hunter-gatherers until 1948, when it was gazetted a national park. At that time, the indigenous populations were relocated to Voi and Mtito Andei as well as other locations within the nearby Taita Hills. Following Kenyan independence in 1963, hunting was banned in the park and management of Tsavo was turned over to the authority that eventually became the Kenya Wildlife Service. Tsavo currently attracts photo-tourists from all over the world interested in experiencing the vastness of the wilderness and incredible terrain.

== Rock climbing ==
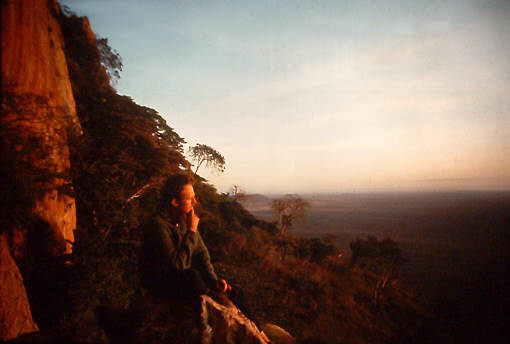
Below Kitchwa Tembo cliffs at dawn.

In 1978, Bill Woodley, then the warden of Tsavo West, invited the Mountain Club of Kenya (MCK) to explore the cliffs in the park. The setting for climbers is superb, with elephants roaming the plains below the cliffs, and eagles, vultures and falcons circling on thermals around the crags, with Kilimanjaro frequently visible on a clear day. The rock-climbing is some of the best in Kenya; solid gneiss walls are often covered in holds and free of vegetation. Cracks and corners abound, but tend to be more vegetated. The most impressive piece of rock, the 300 m (980 ft)-high east face of Kichwa Tembo, attracted the first explorers and resulted in the ascent of Great Tsavo Chimney. Mastodon took three visits before it was completed. A more recent route, Ivory Tower on Elephant Rocks, ranks with the best and hardest bush climb in Kenya. Generally pegs need not be carried. Unless climbing in the shade, an early start is advisable as it often gets very hot on clear days.

== Wildlife ==
Tsavo West National Park has a variety of wildlife, such as eastern black rhinoceros, hippopotamus, Cape buffalo, elephant, leopard and lion. There are also other smaller animals that can be spotted in the park, such as the bushbaby, hartebeest, lesser kudu and Masai giraffe.

== The "Waterman of Tsavo" ==
Patrick Kilonzo Mwalua is a common name amongst conservationists in Tsavo West National Park. He was a farmer from Kajire village in Taita Taveta who took action after witnessing how climate change was drying up his village and leaving animals without water. In 2016 he rented a water bowser and began delivering clean water to wildlife in Tsavo West National Park, hundreds of kilometers away from his home, as much as four times a day.

The animals, such as the buffaloes and elephants, grew fond of him and would routinely wait for him by the watering holes anticipating his arrival. His passion for caring for wildlife earned him praises and a Head of State Commendation award in 2018, that was presented to him by President Uhuru Kenyatta.

He died in June 2024 after battling a kidney failure condition for a while.

== See also ==
- Mzima Springs – a series of natural springs and pools, famous for its hippo and crocodile populations
- Tsavo the local region
- Tsavo East adjoining National Park, founded 1948
