= Tsavo East National Park =

National park in Kenya

- Hifadhi ya Taifa ya Tsavo Mashariki
- IUCN category II (national park)
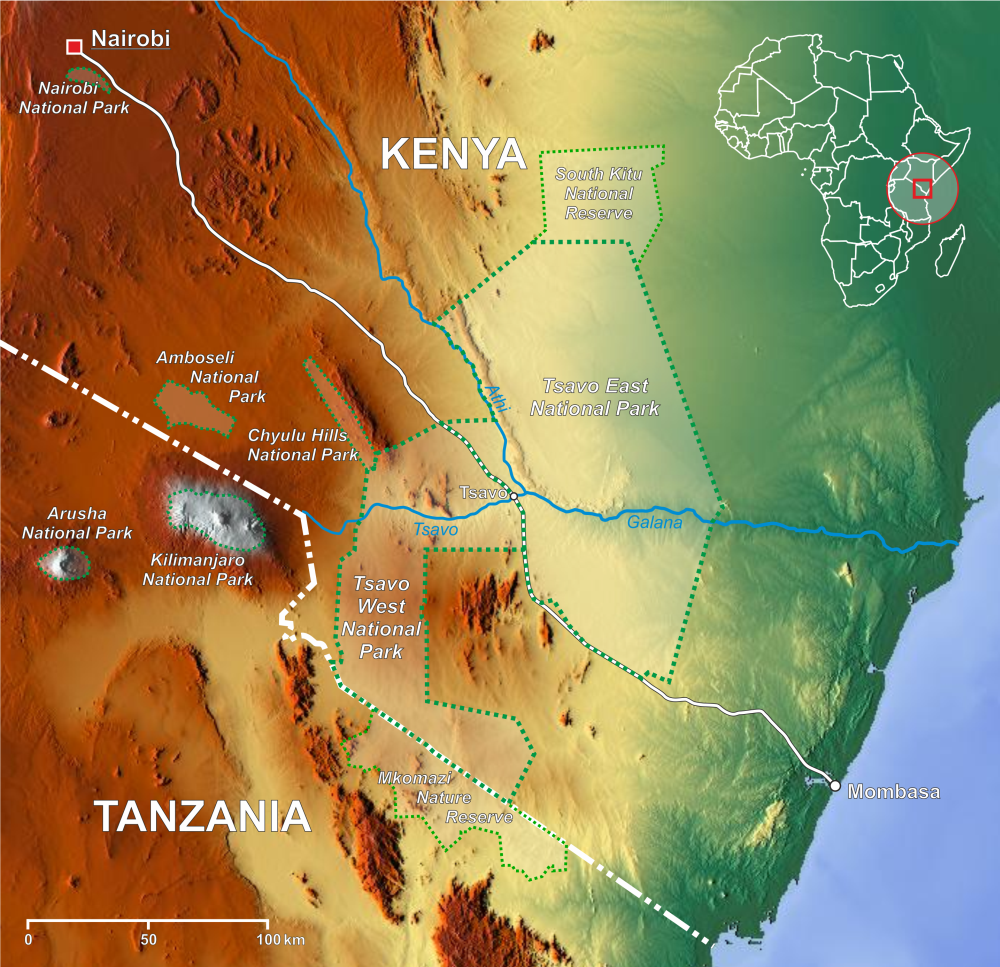
- Location within Tsavo national parks
- Location: Kenya
- Coordinates: 2°46′43″S 38°46′18″E
- Area: 13,747 km^{2} (5,308 sq mi)
- Established: 1948
- Governing body: Kenya Wildlife Service

Tsavo East National Park is a national park in Kenya with an area of 13,747 km^{2} (5,308 sq mi). Established in April 1948 covering a semi-arid area previously known as the Taru Desert. Together with the Tsavo West National Park, it forms an area of about 22,000 km^{2} (8,500 sq mi). The Tsavo River flows west to east through the national park, which is located in the Taita-Taveta County the former Coast Province.

== Geography ==
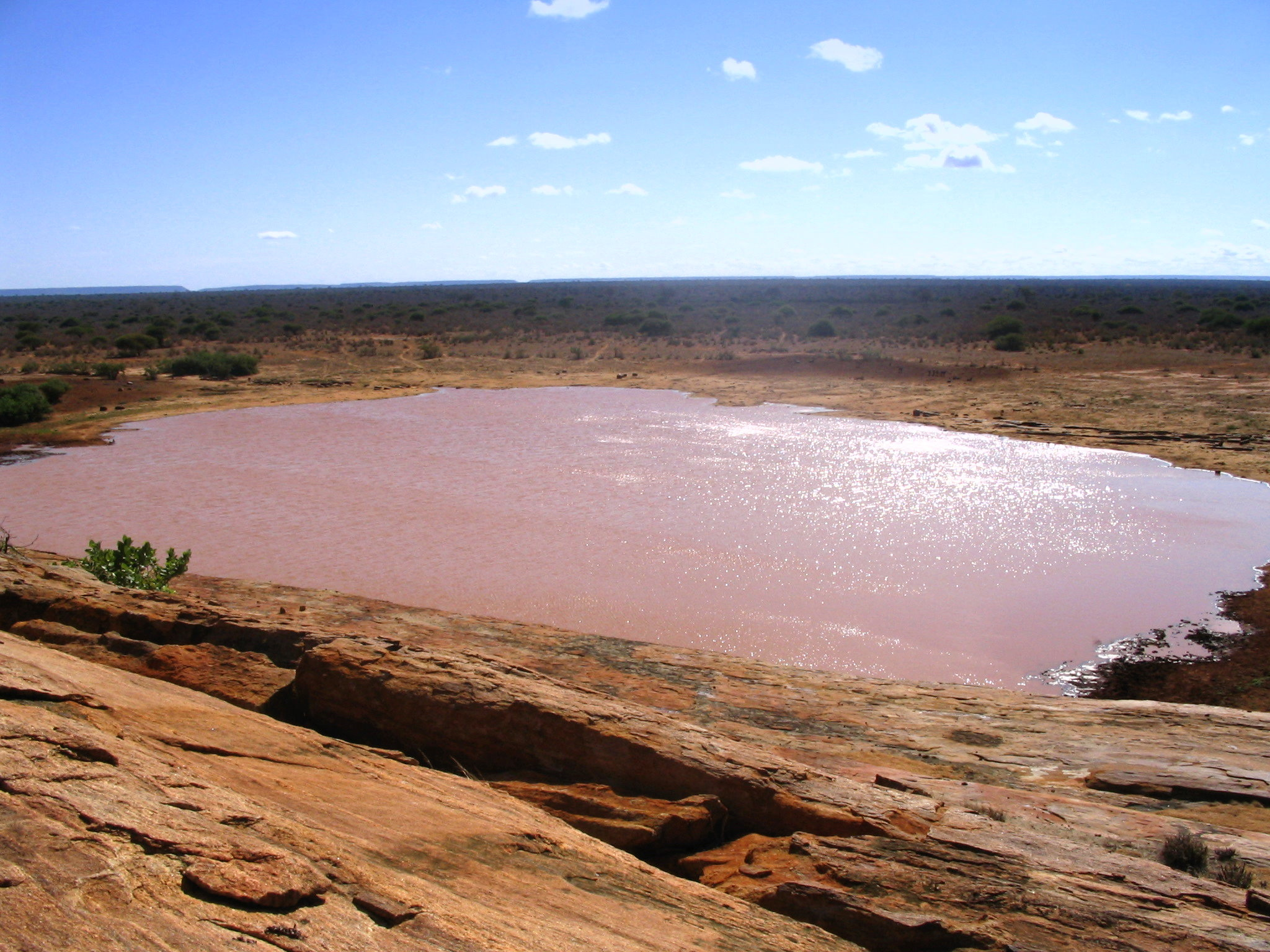
Viewpoint from the top of Mudanda Rock

Tsavo East National Park is generally flat, with dry plains across which the Galana River flows. Other features include the Yatta Plateau and Lugard Falls. Inside Tsavo East National Park, the Athi and Tsavo rivers converge to form the Athi-Galana-Sabaki River. Most of the park consists of semi-arid grasslands and savanna.

The Yatta Plateau, the world's longest lava flow, runs along the western boundary of the park above the Athi-Galana-Sabaki River. Its 290 km (180 mi) length was formed by lava from Ol Donyo Sabuk Mountain. The Mudanda Rock is a 1,600 m (5,200 ft) inselberg of stratified rock that acts as a water catchment that supplies a natural dam below. It offers an excellent vantage point for hundreds of elephants and wildlife that come to drink during the dry season. Lugard Falls, named after Frederick Lugard, is a series of white water rapids on the Athi-Galana-Sabaki River. Aruba Dam was built in 1952 across the Voi River. The reservoir created by the dam attracts many animals and water birds.

Tsavo West National Park is more mountainous and wetter, with swamps, Lake Jipe and the Mzima Springs. It is known for birdlife and for its large mammals. It is also home to a black rhino sanctuary.

== Archaeology and history ==
Although a few Early Stone Age and Middle Stone Age archaeological sites are recorded from ground surface finds in Tsavo, there is much evidence of a thriving Late Stone Age economy from 6,000 to 1,300 years ago. Research has shown that Late Stone Age archaeological sites are found close to the Galana River in high numbers. The inhabitants of these sites hunted wild animals, fished, and kept domesticated animals. Because of the sparse availability of water away from the Galana River, human settlement in Tsavo focused on the riparian areas and rock shelters to the west.

Swahili people traded with the inhabitants of Tsavo for ivory, catskins, and probably slaves as early as 700 CE (and probably earlier). There is no evidence for direct Swahili "colonization" of Tsavo. Instead, trade was probably accomplished by moving goods to and from the Swahili Coast via extended kin-networks. Trade goods such as cowry shells and beads have been recovered from archaeological sites dating to the early Swahili period.

19th century British and German explorers document people now referred to as the Orma and Watha during their travels through the nyika ("bush" or "hinterland"). Generally viewed as hostile toward their interests. Beginning in the late 19th/early 20th century, the British began a concerted effort to colonise the interior of Kenya and built a railway through Tsavo in 1898. Two Tsavo Man-Eaters terrorised the construction crews led by John Henry Patterson who eventually shot the pair but not before they had killed one hundred and thirty five Indians and local workers. The railway was eventually completed to Kisumu on Lake Victoria.

Tsavo remained the homeland for Orma pastoralists and Watha hunter-gatherers until 1948, when it was gazetted a national park. At that time, the Orma with their livestock were removed and the Watha people were forcefully relocated to Voi and Mtito Andei as well as other locations within the nearby Taita Hills. Following Kenyan independence in 1963, hunting was banned in the park and management of Tsavo was turned over to the authority that eventually became the Kenya Wildlife Service.

== Wildlife ==
Tsavo East National Park is considered one of the world's biodiversity strongholds, providing undeveloped homes to vast numbers of animals.

=== Mammals ===
Famous are the Tsavo lions, a population whose adult males often lack manes entirely. As of 2006, there were about 675 lions in the Amboseli-Tsavo ecosystem.

Some of the many mammals found in the park include:

- Aardwolf
- Yellow baboon
- African buffalo
- Senegal bushbaby
- Bushbuck
- Caracal
- African wildcat
- Southeast African cheetah
- African civet
- Kirk's dik-dik
- African wild dog
- African dormouse
- Blue duiker
- Bush duiker
- Harvey's red duiker
- Common eland
- African bush elephant
- Bat-eared fox
- Northern greater galago
- Grant's gazelle
- Rusty-spotted genet
- Common genet
- Gerenuk
- Giraffe
- African savanna hare
- Springhare
- Coke's hartebeest
- Hunter's hartebeest
- East African hedgehog
- Spotted hyena
- Striped hyena
- Yellow-spotted rock hyrax
- Southern tree hyrax
- Impala
- Black-backed jackal
- Side-striped jackal
- Klipspringer
- Lesser kudu
- African leopard
- Lion
- Banded mongoose
- Dwarf mongoose
- Egyptian mongoose
- Marsh mongoose
- Slender mongoose
- White-tailed mongoose
- Vervet monkey
- Sykes' monkey
- Fringe-eared oryx
- Clawless otter
- Ground pangolin
- Crested porcupine
- Cane rat
- Giant rat
- Naked mole rat
- Honey badger
- Bohor reedbuck
- Black rhinoceros
- Serval
- Elephant shrew
- Bush squirrel
- Red bush squirrel
- Striped ground squirrel
- Unstriped ground squirrel
- Suni
- Common warthog
- waterbuck
- Plains zebra
- Grevy's zebra

=== Birds ===
Over 500 bird species have been recorded in the area, including ostriches, kestrels, buzzards, starlings, weaver birds, kingfishers, hornbills, secretary birds and herons.

=== Dida, The "Queen of Tsavo" ===
Dida was a female elephant that lived in Tsavo East National Park. Famously known for her long tusks and considered one of Africa’s largest female tuskers.

Estimated to be between 60 and 65 years old at the time of her death. Over the years, she cared for several generations of elephants. As Tsavo’s long-standing female leader, Dida represented years of experience and insight passed down through many generations.

Dida died in 2022 from natural causes attributed to her advanced age. Her remains were found after some time, with only bones left, suggesting she had died long before the discovery.

== Threats ==
=== Human-Wildlife Conflict ===
Elephants raiding farms continues to be a major source of human-wildlife conflict amongst the communities living around Tsavo East National Park like Taita Taveta. Several cases of invasions have been reported, with the latest being in May 2025, when an elephant strayed into the community.

Farmers use bees to deter elephants from invading their farms.

In 2017, stray lions from Tsavo East Park strayed into Magarini Constituency, killing several livestock.

A key reason for the human-wildlife conflicts is often drought, which forces the animals into communities, in search of food and water.

=== Poaching ===
Poachers target animals in parks for the game meat and the ivory tusks in some animals such the tusker elephants. The government and partners have however put strong measures in place to minimize poaching in the park.

Satao, a well-known tusker elephant who had lived in Tsavo East National Park for over four decades, was killed by ivory poachers. His body was found mutilated, with the tusks removed, having been struck by a poisoned arrow. He was killed in May 2014.

In 2017, Satao II, another tusker in Tsavo Park was killed by poachers. The body was discovered during a routine flyover of the park, with the tusks still intact. He was 50 years old when was killed. Shortly after the carcass was discovered, two individuals suspected of being involved in the killing were arrested.

Poaching was evident in 2022 during a severe drought, as people hunted wildlife for meat.

=== Drought ===
Prolonged drought is putting pressure on national parks, leading to evaporation of water sources and reduced food availability. This leads to increased mortality, and greater stress on already fragile ecosystems. Weather patterns have become unpredictable due to climate change, further worsening the situation.

In December 2021 Wide Satao was found in a weakened state after his tracking collar sent immobility alerts. Despite efforts by Tsavo Trust and Save the Elephants, he died later that night. His death was attributed to old age, with his declining condition made worse by the prolonged drought affecting the region.

In 2022, the country faced a severe drought that significantly affected the wildlife in parks, including the Tsavo ecosystem. Several elephants, common zebras, buffaloes and other wild animals were lost.
