= List of airports by ICAO code: H =

List of airports by ICAO code: A - B - C - D - EB-EG - EH-EY - FA-FM - FN-FZ - G - H - ~~I~~ - J - K - L - M - N - O - P - Q - R - S - T - U - V - W - ~~X~~ - Y - Z

== HA - Ethiopia ==
Also see airport category and list.

ICAO	IATA	Airport name	Community	Coordinates	Notes
HAAB	ADD	Bole International Airport	Addis Ababa	08°58′40″N 038°47′58″E	
HAAD		Adaba Airport		07°01′23″N 039°16′23″E	
HAAL		Lideta Army Airport	Addis Ababa	09°00′13″N 038°43′34″E	
HAAM	AMH	Arba Minch Airport	Arba Minch	06°02′23″N 037°35′25″E	
HAAX	AXU	Axum Airport	Axum	14°08′13″N 038°46′34″E	
HABC	BCO	Jinka Airport	Jinka	05°45′00″N 036°33′45″E	
HABD	BJR	Bahir Dar Airport	Bahir Dar	11°36′29″N 037°19′17″E	
HABE	BEI	Beica Airport	Beica	09°23′31″N 034°31′09″E	Abandoned
HABU	BCY	Bulchi Airport	Bulchi	06°13′00″N 036°40′00″E	Closed
HACP		Calub Airport		06°09′53″N 044°32′39″E	
HADA		Dansha Airport	Dansha	13°38′10″N 036°55′50″E	
HADC	DSE	Kombolcha Airport	Dessie	11°06′40″N 039°43′30″E	
HADD	DEM	Dembidolo Airport	Dembidolo	08°33′15″N 034°51′30″E	
HADM	DBM	Debre Marqos Airport	Debre Marqos	10°19′16″N 037°44′30″E	
HADO		Dodola Airport	Dodola	07°01′15″N 039°03′00″E	
HADR	DIR	Aba Tenna Dejazmach Yilma International Airport	Dire Dawa	09°37′28″N 041°51′15″E	
HADT	DBT	Debre Tabor Airport	Debre Tabor	11°53′06″N 038°00′32″E	
HAFN	FNH	Fincha Airport	Finicha'a	09°35′00″N 037°22′35″E	
HAGB	GOB	Robe Airport	Goba	07°07′05″N 040°02′45″E	
HAGH	GNN	Ghinnir Airport	Ghinnir	07°08′44″N 040°42′55″E	
HAGL		Geladin Airport		06°59′04″N 046°25′17″E	
HAGM	GMB	Gambela Airport	Gambela	08°07′43″N 034°33′47″E	
HAGN	GDQ	Gondar Airport	Gondar	12°31′11″N 037°26′02″E	
HAGO	GDE	Gode Airport	Gode	05°56′07″N 043°34′43″E	Military
HAGR	GOR	Gore Airport	Gore	08°09′40″N 035°33′10″E	
HAHM	QHR	Harar Meda Airport	Debre Zeyit	08°42′59″N 039°00′21″E	
HAHU	HUE	Humera Airport	Humera	13°49′49″N 036°52′54″E	
HAJJ	JIJ	Jijiga Gerad Wilwal Airport	Jijiga	09°19′51″N 042°54′40″E	
HAJM	JIM	Aba Segud Airport	Jimma	07°39′57″N 036°48′59″E	
HAKD	ABK	Kabri Dar Airport	Kabri Dar	06°43′58″N 044°14′30″E	
HAKL	LFO	Kelafo Airport	Kelafo	05°39′25″N 044°21′00″E	
HALA	AWA	Awasa Airport	Awasa	07°05′42″N 038°23′54″E	
HALL	LLI	Lalibela Airport	Lalibela	11°58′26″N 038°59′28″E	
HAMA		Mekane Salam Airport		10°43′28″N 038°44′29″E	
HAMJ	TUJ	Tum Airport	Tum	06°15′35″N 035°31′10″E	
HAMK	MQX	Alula Aba Nega Airport	Mek'ele	13°28′02″N 039°32′00″E	
HAML		Masslo Airport		06°24′29″N 039°43′26″E	
HAMM		Genda Wuha Airport		12°55′59″N 036°10′01″E	Closed
HAMN	NDM	Mendi Airport	Mendi	09°46′01″N 035°00′00″E	Closed
HAMR		Mui Airport		05°51′53″N 035°44′55″E	
HAMT	MTF	Mizan Teferi Airport	Mizan Teferi	06°57′27″N 035°33′18″E	
HANG	EGL	Neghele Airport	Negele Boran	05°17′38″N 039°42′19″E	Military
HANJ	NEJ	Nejjo Airport	Nejo	09°31′20″N 035°29′45″E	
HANK	NEK	Nekemte Airport	Nekemte	09°02′06″N 036°36′45″E	
HASD		Sodo Airport		06°49′01″N 037°45′00″E	Closed
HASH		Sheik Hussein Airport		07°44′30″N 040°41′44″E	
HASK	SKR	Shakiso Airport	Shakiso	05°41′30″N 038°58′30″E	
HASL	HIL	Shilavo Airport	Shilavo	06°04′40″N 044°45′50″E	Formerly HAPW
HASM	SZE	Semera Airport	Semera	11°47′15″N 040°59′30″E	
HASO	ASO	Asosa Airport	Asosa	10°01′06″N 034°35′10″E	
HASR	SHC	Shire Airport	Shire	14°04′46″N 038°16′15″E	
HATP	TIE	Tippi Airport	Tippi	07°12′09″N 035°24′54″E	
HAWC	WAC	Wacca Airport	Wacca	07°10′01″N 037°10′01″E	Closed

== HB - Burundi ==
Also see airport category and list.

ICAO	IATA	Airport name	Community	Coordinates	Notes
HBBA	BJM	Bujumbura International Airport	Bujumbura	03°19′26″S 029°19′07″E	
HBBE	GID	Gitega Airport	Gitega	03°25′05″S 029°54′45″E	
HBBK		Gihofi Airport		04°02′03″S 030°07′54″E	
HBBL		Nyanza-Lac Airport	Nyanza-Lac	04°20′22″S 029°35′50″E	Closed
HBBO	KRE	Kirundo Airport	Kirundo	02°32′40″S 030°05′40″E	

== HC - Somalia ==
Also see airport category and list.

ICAO	IATA	Airport name	Community	Coordinates	Notes
HCAD	AAD	Adado Airport	Adado	06°05′45″N 046°38′15″E	
HCBM	BXX	Borama Airport	Borama	09°56′44″N 043°09′03″E	
HCBW		Baraawe Airport		01°05′39″N 043°59′43″E	Closed
HCDB		Dhobley Airport		00°24′07″N 040°59′46″E	
HCDL		Dolow Airport		04°08′57″N 042°04′52″E	
HCDM		Dusa Mareb Airport		05°28′19″N 046°21′37″E	
HCGD		Galdogob Airport		07°04′34″N 047°07′18″E	Closed
HCKB		Kalabaidh Airport		09°41′22″N 043°28′30″E	
HCMA	ALU	Alula Airport	Alula	11°57′30″N 050°44′55″E	
HCMB	BIB	Baidoa Airport	Baidoa	03°05′34″N 043°37′04″E	
HCMC	CXN	Candala Airport	Candala (Qandala)	11°29′40″N 049°54′31″E	
HCMD	BSY	Bardera Airport	Bardera	02°20′12″N 042°18′28″E	
HCME	HCM	Eyl Airport	Eyl (Eil)	08°06′15″N 049°49′12″E	
HCMF	BSA	Bosaso Airport	Bosaso	11°16′32″N 049°09′00″E	
HCMG	GSR	Qardho Airport	Qardho (Gardo)	09°32′35″N 049°07′04″E	
HCMH	HGA	Hargeisa International Airport	Hargeisa	09°31′06″N 044°05′20″E	
HCMI	BBO	Berbera Airport	Berbera	10°23′21″N 044°56′28″E	
HCMJ	LGX	Lugh Ganane Airport	Lugh Ganane (Luuq)	03°48′45″N 042°32′45″E	
HCMK	KMU	Kismayo Airport	Kismayo (Kisimayu)	00°23′22″S 042°26′51″E	
HCMM	MGQ	Aden Adde International Airport	Mogadishu	02°00′50″N 045°18′15″E	
HCMN	BLW	Beledweyne Airport (Ugas Khalif Airport)	Beledweyne	04°46′00″N 045°14′20″E	
HCMO	CMO	Hobyo Airport	Obbia (Hobyo)	05°21′21″N 048°30′52″E	
HCMP		Las Anod Airport	Laascaanood (Las Anod)	08°34′00″N 047°20′35″E	
HCMR	GLK	Abdullahi Yusuf International Airport	Galkayo	06°46′51″N 047°27′16″E	
HCMS	CMS	Iskushuban Airport	Iskushuban (Scusciuban)	10°18′50″N 050°12′20″E	
HCMU	ERA	Erigavo Airport	Erigavo	10°38′32″N 047°23′17″E	
HCMV	BUO	Burao Airport	Burao	09°31′58″N 045°33′35″E	
HCMW	GGR	Garowe Airport	Garowe	08°27′39″N 048°34′20″E	Formerly HCGR

== HD - Djibouti ==
Also see airport category and list.

ICAO	IATA	Airport name	Community	Coordinates
HDAG		Assa-Gueyla Airport	Assa-Gueyla	12°11′20″N 042°38′15″E
HDAM	JIB	Djibouti-Ambouli International Airport	Djibouti City	11°32′47″N 043°09′33″E
HDAS	AII	Ali-Sabieh Airport	Ali-Sabieh	11°08′49″N 042°43′12″E
HDCH		Chabelley Airport	Chabelley	11°31′00″N 043°03′43″E
HDDK		Dikhil Airport	Dikhil	11°05′50″N 042°21′00″E
HDHE		Herkale Airport	Herkale	12°26′30″N 043°17′30″E
HDMO	MHI	Moucha Airport	Moucha Island	11°43′47″N 043°12′34″E
HDOB	OBC	Obock Airport	Obock	11°58′06″N 043°16′43″E
HDTJ	TDJ	Tadjoura Airport	Tadjoura	11°47′14″N 042°55′04″E

== HE - Egypt ==
Also see airport category and list.

ICAO	IATA	Airport name	Community	Coordinates	Notes
HEAL	DBB	Al Alamain International Airport	El Alamein	30°55′28″N 028°27′41″E	
HEAR	AAC	El Arish International Airport	El Arish	31°02′16″N 033°49′09″E	
HEAT	ATZ	Assiut Airport	Assiut	27°02′47″N 031°00′43″E	
HEAX	HBE	Alexandria International Airport	Alexandria	30°55′04″N 029°41′47″E	
HEAZ		Almaza Air Base	Cairo	30°05′30″N 031°21′36″E	
HEBL	ABS	Abu Simbel Airport	Abu Simbel	22°22′33″N 031°36′42″E	
HEBR	EES	Berenice International Airport	Berenice	23°58′50″N 035°27′37″E	
HEBS		Beni Suef Air Base	Beni Suef	29°12′08″N 031°00′48″E	
HECA	CAI	Cairo International Airport	Cairo	30°07′19″N 031°24′20″E	
HECP	CCE	Capital International Airport	Proposed new capital of Egypt	30°04′33″N 031°50′00″E	
HECW	CWE	Cairo West Air Base	Cairo	30°07′00″N 030°55′00″E	
HEDK	DAK	Dakhla Oasis Airport	Dakhla Oasis	25°24′40″N 029°00′10″E	
HEEM		Embaba Airport	Giza	30°04′29″N 031°11′29″E	Closed
HEGN	HRG	Hurghada International Airport	Hurghada	27°10′41″N 033°47′57″E	
HEGO	HGO	El Gouna Airport	Hurghada	27°22′00″N 033°40′05″E	
HEGR		El Gora Airport	El Gorah	31°04′30″N 034°08′10″E	
HEGS		Jiyanklis Air Base	Kafr El Dawwar	30°49′11″N 030°11′28″E	
HEKG	UVL	El Kharga Airport	El Kharga	25°28′25″N 030°35′25″E	
HELX	LXR	Luxor International Airport	Luxor	25°40′15″N 032°42′23″E	
HEMA	RMF	Marsa Alam International Airport	Marsa Alam	25°33′25″N 034°35′01″E	
HEMM	MUH	Marsa Matruh International Airport	Mersa Matruh	31°19′30″N 027°13′20″E	
HEMN		El Minya Airport		28°05′26″N 030°44′19″E	
HEOC		October Airport	6th of October City	29°48′46″N 030°49′24″E	
HEOW	GSQ	Sharq Al-Owainat Airport	Sharq Al-Owainat	22°35′00″N 028°43′00″E	
HEPS	PSD	Port Said Airport	Port Said	31°16′46″N 032°14′24″E	
HESC	SKV	St. Catherine International Airport	St. Catherine	28°41′07″N 034°03′45″E	
HESG	HMB	Sohag International Airport	Sohag	26°20′25″N 031°44′20″E	Formerly HEMK
HESH	SSH	Sharm el-Sheikh International Airport	Sharm El Sheikh	27°58′38″N 034°23′41″E	
HESN	ASW	Aswan Airport	Aswan	23°57′51″N 032°49′11″E	
HESX	SPX	Sphinx International Airport	Giza	30°06′35″N 030°53′40″E	
HETB	TCP	Taba International Airport	Taba	29°35′16″N 034°46′41″E	
HETR	ELT	El Tor Airport	El Tor	28°12′30″N 033°38′45″E	

== HH - Eritrea ==
Also see airport category and list.

ICAO	IATA	Airport name	Community	Coordinates
HHAG		Agordat Airport	Agordat	15°32′10″N 037°51′45″E
HHAS	ASM	Asmara International Airport	Asmara	15°17′31″N 038°54′38″E
HHMS	MSW	Massawa International Airport	Massawa	15°41′00″N 039°22′05″E
HHNF		Nakfa Airport	Nakfa	16°40′23″N 038°30′20″E
HHSB	ASA	Assab International Airport	Assab	13°04′18″N 042°38′42″E
HHTS	TES	Teseney Airport	Teseney	15°06′10″N 036°41′00″E

== HJ - South Sudan ==
Also see airport category and list.

South Sudan obtained a dedicated ICAO airport code prefix, HJ, in 2021. However, many airports continue to use the HS prefix that is used by Sudan.

ICAO	IATA	Airport name	Community	Coordinates	Notes
HJAG		Agok Airport	Agok	09°21′36″N 028°35′03″E	
HJAK		Akobo Airport	Akobo	07°46′41″N 033°00′10″E	
HJAR	AEE	Adareil Airport	Adareil	10°03′13″N 032°57′34″E	
HJAW		Aweil Airport	Aweil	08°47′35″N 027°21′37″E	
HJBR		Bor Airport	Bor	06°11′47″N 031°36′05″E	
HJBT		Bentiu Airport	Bentiu	09°18′13″N 029°47′14″E	
HJFA		Paloich Airport	Paloich	10°31′44″N 032°30′04″E	
HJGA		Ganyiel Airport		07°23′56″N 030°28′20″E	
HJGO		Gogrial Airport	Gogrial	08°32′24″N 028°06′00″E	Closed
HJJJ	JUB	Juba International Airport	Juba	04°52′19″N 031°36′04″E	
HJKJ		Kago Kaju Airport	Kago Kaju	03°51′19″N 031°39′32″E	
HJKP		Kapoeta Airport	Kapoeta	04°46′48″N 033°35′06″E	
HJLR		Leer Airport	Leer	08°18′29″N 030°06′55″E	
HJMD		Maridi Airport	Maridi	04°54′10″N 029°26′36″E	
HJNM		Nimule Airport	Nimule	03°35′53″N 032°05′24″E	
HJPA		Pochalla Airport	Pochalla	07°10′48″N 034°05′42″E	
HJPI		Pibor Airport	Pibor	06°47′37″N 033°07′49″E	
HJRB	RBX	Rumbek Airport	Rumbek	06°49′52″N 029°40′09″E	
HJRJ		Raga Airport	Raga	08°27′54″N 025°40′48″E	
HJRK		Renk Airport	Renk	11°38′41″N 032°48′38″E	Formerly HJRN
HJSM	MAK	Malakal Airport	Malakal	09°33′32″N 031°39′08″E	Formerly HJMK
HJTH		Tharjath Airport	Rier Market	08°46′59″N 030°07′51″E	
HJTO		Tonj Airport	Tonj	07°15′58″N 028°39′45″E	
HJTR		Torit Airport	Torit	04°24′40″N 032°34′44″E	
HJTU		Tumbura Airport	Tumbura	05°36′00″N 027°28′21″E	
HJWW	WUU	Wau Airport	Wau	07°43′30″N 027°58′48″E	
HJYA		Yambio Airport	Yambio	04°34′12″N 028°25′32″E	
HJYE		Yei Airport	Yei	04°07′57″N 030°43′17″E	
HJYL		Yirol Airport	Yirol	06°33′36″N 030°30′36″E	

== HK - Kenya ==
Also see airport category and list.

ICAO	IATA	Airport name	Community	Coordinates	Notes
HKAM	ASV	Amboseli Airport	Amboseli	02°38′32″S 037°15′00″E	
HKBA		Busia Airport	Busia	00°27′20″N 034°07′48″E	
HKBM	BMQ	Bamburi Airport	Bamburi	03°58′53″S 039°43′52″E	
HKBR		Bura East Airport	Bura	01°11′06″S 039°48′50″E	
HKBU		Bungoma Airport	Bungoma	00°34′35″N 034°33′05″E	
HKCC		Cottars Mara Airport	Cottar's Camp	01°40′49″S 035°20′35″E	
HKDA		Dadaab Airstrip	Dadaab	00°03′29″N 040°19′05″E	
HKED		Eldoret Boma Airstrip	Eldoret	00°32′13″N 035°16′50″E	
HKEL	EDL	Eldoret International Airport	Eldoret	00°24′16″N 035°14′20″E	
HKEM		Embu Airport	Embu	00°34′08″S 037°29′32″E	
HKES	EYS	Eliye Springs Airport	Eliye Springs	03°14′11″N 035°58′28″E	
HKEW		El Wak Airport	El Wak	02°48′51″N 040°51′19″E	
HKFG	KLK	Kalokol Airport	Kalokol	03°29′24″N 035°50′24″E	
HKFT		Fig Tree Airport	Masai Mara National Park	01°26′02″S 035°11′51″E	
HKGA	GAS	Garissa Airport	Garissa	00°28′07″S 039°38′58″E	
HKGT		Garba Tula Airport	Garba Tula	00°31′12″N 038°30′56″E	
HKHB		Homa Bay Airport	Homa Bay	00°35′30″S 034°28′48″E	
HKHO	HOA	Hola Airport	Hola	01°31′12″S 040°00′14″E	
HKIK		Orly (Olooitikoshi) Airport		01°34′52″S 036°48′46″E	
HKIS		Isiolo Airport	Isiolo	00°20′37″N 037°35′16″E	
HKJK	NBO	Jomo Kenyatta International Airport	Nairobi	01°19′07″S 036°55′33″E	Formerly Nairobi International Airport
HKKA		Kabarak Airport	Kabarak	00°11′21″S 035°57′46″E	
HKKB		Kiambere Airport	Kiambere	00°38′09″S 037°52′38″E	
HKKE	KEU	Keekorok Airport	Masai Mara	01°35′09″S 035°15′06″E	
HKKG	GGM	Kakamega Airport	Kakamega	00°16′12″N 034°47′00″E	
HKKI	KIS	Kisumu International Airport	Kisumu	00°05′10″S 034°43′44″E	
HKKL	ILU	Kilaguni Airport	Kilaguni	02°54′00″S 038°04′26″E	
HKKM		Kakuma Airport	Kakuma	03°42′18″N 034°52′17″E	
HKKP		Kabarnet Airport	Kabarnet	00°32′23″N 035°43′41″E	
HKKR	KEY	Kericho Airport	Kericho	00°23′06″S 035°14′42″E	
HKKS		Kisii Airport	Kisii	00°40′21″S 034°41′20″E	
HKKT	KTL	Kitale Airport	Kitale	00°58′30″N 034°57′36″E	
HKKU		Ithookwe Airstrip	Kitui	01°22′22″S 037°58′41″E	
HKLG		Lokitaung Airport	Lokitaung	04°19′12″N 035°41′24″E	
HKLK	LKG	Lokichogio Airport	Lokichogio	04°12′18″N 034°20′42″E	
HKLO	LOK	Lodwar Airport	Lodwar	03°07′20″N 035°36′36″E	
HKLT		Loitokitok Airstrip	Loitokitok	02°54′35″S 037°31′30″E	
HKLU	LAU	Manda Airport	Lamu	02°14′46″S 040°54′36″E	
HKLY	LOY	Loiyangalani Airport	Loiyangalani	02°46′07″N 036°43′00″E	
HKMA	NDE	Mandera Airport	Mandera	03°56′15″N 041°50′55″E	
HKMB	RBT	Marsabit Airport	Marsabit	02°20′42″N 038°00′00″E	
HKMF		Maasai Mara North Airport		01°08′44″S 035°07′30″E	
HKMG		Magadi Airport	Magadi	01°56′49″S 036°16′48″E	
HKMI		Kisima Airport	Kisima	00°57′00″N 036°48′00″E	
HKMK	JJM	Mulika Lodge Airport	Meru National Park	00°09′54″N 038°11′42″E	
HKML	MYD	Malindi Airport	Malindi	03°12′54″S 040°06′00″E	
HKMM		Migori Airport	Migori	01°06′58″S 034°29′09″E	Formerly HKMJ
HKMO	MBA	Moi International Airport	Mombasa	04°02′24″S 039°35′24″E	
HKMR		Mackinnon Road Airport	Mackinnon Road	03°44′00″S 039°02′42″E	
HKMS	MRE	Mara Serena Airport	Maasai Mara	01°24′18″S 035°00′36″E	
HKMT		Mtito Andei Airport	Mtito Andei	02°42′00″S 038°10′27″E	
HKMU		Makindu Airport		02°17′33″S 037°49′36″E	
HKMY	OYL	Moyale Lower Airport	Moyale	03°27′54″N 039°06′18″E	
HKMZ		Musiara Airstrip		01°17′59″S 035°03′55″E	
HKNI	NYE	Nyeri Airport	Nyeri	00°22′17″S 036°58′53″E	
HKNK	NUU	Nakuru Airport	Nakuru	00°17′59″S 036°09′38″E	
HKNL	NYK	Nanyuki Airport	Nanyuki	00°03′40″S 037°02′31″E	
HKNO		Narok Airport	Narok	01°09′00″S 035°46′01″E	
HKNV		Naivasha Airport	Naivasha	00°47′06″S 036°26′02″E	
HKNW	WIL	Wilson Airport	Nairobi	01°19′12″S 036°48′54″E	
HKNY		Laikipia Air Base	Nanyuki	00°01′51″N 037°01′31″E	
HKOK		Olkiombo Airport		01°24′31″S 035°06′38″E	
HKRE		Eastleigh Airport	Nairobi	01°16′38″S 036°51′44″E	
HKSB	UAS	Samburu Airport	Samburu	00°31′09″N 037°31′48″E	
HKTB		Kichwa Tembo Airstrip		01°15′49″S 035°01′39″E	
HKUK	UKA	Ukunda Airport	Diani Beach	04°17′49″S 039°34′17″E	
HKVG		Vipingo Estate Airport	Vipingo	03°49′00″S 039°47′43″E	
HKVO		Voi Airport	Voi	03°21′44″S 038°31′54″E	
HKWE		Webuye Airport	Webuye	00°35′54″N 034°43′49″E	
HKWJ	WJR	Wajir Airport	Wajir	01°43′48″N 040°05′24″E	

== HL - Libya ==
Also see airport category and list.

ICAO	IATA	Airport name	Community	Coordinates	Notes
HLAM		Amal V12 Airport		29°28′46″N 021°07′21″E	
HLBD		Beda M3 Airport		28°30′12″N 019°00′10″E	
HLFL		Bu Attifel Airport		28°47′43″N 022°04′51″E	
HLGD		Ghardabiya Air Base	Sirte	31°03′38″N 016°36′42″E	
HLGL		Warehouse 59E Airport		28°38′19″N 021°26′17″E	
HLGT	GHT	Ghat Airport	Ghat	25°08′20″N 010°08′40″E	
HLJF		Al Jufra Air Base	Al Jufra	29°11′53″N 016°00′04″E	
HLKF	AKF	Kufra Airport	Kufra	24°10′40″N 023°18′50″E	
HLLB	BEN	Benina International Airport	Benghazi	32°05′50″N 020°16′10″E	
HLLM	MJI	Mitiga International Airport	Tripoli	32°53′30″N 013°17′16″E	
HLLQ	LAQ	Al Abraq International Airport	Bayda	32°47′19″N 021°57′51″E	
HLLS	SEB	Sabha Airport	Sabha	27°00′00″N 014°27′40″E	
HLLT	TIP	Tripoli International Airport	Tripoli	32°39′49″N 013°09′33″E	Closed
HLMB	LMQ	Marsa Brega Airport	Brega	30°22′41″N 019°34′35″E	
HLMS	MRA	Misrata International Airport	Misrata	32°19′32″N 015°03′35″E	
HLNF		Ras Lanuf Airport		30°30′00″N 018°31′35″E	
HLNR		Nafurah 1 Airport		29°12′48″N 021°35′33″E	
HLON		Hun Airport	Hun	29°06′40″N 015°57′50″E	
HLRA		Dahra Airport		29°28′16″N 017°55′46″E	
HLSA		Sarir Airport		27°39′45″N 022°30′31″E	
HLSD		Sidra Airport		30°38′35″N 018°19′15″E	
HLTD	LTD	Ghadames Airport	Ghadames	30°09′02″N 009°42′00″E	
HLTQ		Tobruk Airport	Tobruk	31°51′40″N 023°54′25″E	Formerly HLGN
HLUB		Ubari Airport	Ubari	26°34′03″N 012°49′23″E	
HLWA		Warehouse 59A Airport		28°19′21″N 019°55′48″E	
HLWD		Beni Walid Airport		31°44′21″N 013°57′14″E	
HLWN		Waddan Airport	Waddan	29°08′20″N 016°09′35″E	
HLZA		Zella 74 Airport		28°35′15″N 017°17′55″E	
HLZG		Oxy A103 Airport		29°00′23″N 020°47′10″E	
HLZN		Alzintan Airport	Zintan	31°46′30″N 012°15′00″E	
HLZW		Zuwarah Airport	Zuwarah	32°57′10″N 012°01′00″E	

== HR - Rwanda ==
Also see airport category and list.

ICAO	IATA	Airport name	Community	Coordinates	Notes
HRYG	GYI	Gisenyi Airport	Gisenyi	01°40′38″S 029°15′32″E	
HRYI	BTQ	Butare Airport	Butare	02°35′42″S 029°44′24″E	
HRYN		Nemba Airport	Nemba	02°19′48″S 030°12′00″E	
HRYO		Gabiro Airport		01°32′45″S 030°22′57″E	Closed
HRYR	KGL	Kigali International Airport	Kigali	01°58′07″S 030°08′22″E	Formerly Gregoire Kayibanda Airport
HRYU	RHG	Ruhengeri Airport	Ruhengeri	01°30′00″S 029°38′01″E	
HRZA	KME	Kamembe Airport	Cyangugu	02°27′44″S 028°54′29″E	

== HS - Sudan and South Sudan ==
=== Sudan ===
Also see airport category and list.

ICAO	IATA	Airport name	Community	Coordinates	Notes
HSAT	ATB	Atbara Airport	Atbarah (Atbara)	17°42′35″N 034°03′25″E	
HSCG		Carthago Airport	Carthago	18°45′05″N 036°59′30″E	
HSDB	EDB	Eldebba Airport	Eldebba	18°00′50″N 030°57′35″E	
HSDI	ADV	Ed Daein Airport	Ed Daein	11°24′13″N 026°07′09″E	
HSDL		Dilling Airport	Dilling (Dalang)	11°59′30″N 029°40′25″E	
HSDN	DOG	Dongola Airport	Dongola	19°09′13″N 030°25′48″E	
HSDZ	RSS	Damazin Airport	Damazin	11°47′09″N 034°20′11″E	
HSFS	ELF	El Fasher Airport	Al-Fashir (El Fasher)	13°36′53″N 025°19′28″E	
HSGF	GSU	Azaza Airport	El-Gadarif	14°07′50″N 035°18′25″E	
HSGG	DNX	Galegu Airport	Dinder	12°31′59″N 035°04′01″E	Closed
HSGN	EGN	Geneina Airport	Geneina	13°29′00″N 022°28′00″E	
HSHG		Heglig Airport	Heglig	09°59′36″N 029°23′53″E	
HSKA	KSL	Kassala Airport	Kassala	14°55′30″N 035°52′40″E	
HSKG	GBU	Khashm El Girba Airport	Khashm El Girba	14°55′30″N 035°52′41″E	
HSKI	KST	Kosti Airport	Kosti	13°05′19″N 032°51′10″E	
HSKN		Kenana Airport		13°03′15″N 032°54′25″E	
KSLI		Kadugli Airport	Kadugli (Kaduqli)	11°08′16″N 029°42′04″E	
HSMN	MWE	Merowe Airport	Merowe	18°26′35″N 031°50′35″E	
HSMR		Merowe Town Airport	Merowe	18°27′20″N 031°49′07″E	
HSND		Shendi Airport	Shendi	16°42′18″N 033°26′47″E	
HSNH	NUD	En Nahud Airport	En Nahud	12°42′10″N 028°26′10″E	
HSNN	UYL	Nyala Airport	Nyala	12°03′13″N 024°57′22″E	
HSNR		Sennar Airport	Sennar	13°33′00″N 033°37′01″E	Closed
HSNW	NHF	New Halfa Airport	New Halfa	15°21′20″N 035°43′40″E	
HSOB	EBD	El Obeid Airport	El Obeid	13°09′11″N 030°13′57″E	
HSPN	PZU	Port Sudan New International Airport	Port Sudan	19°26′01″N 037°14′03″E	
HSSK	KRT	Khartoum International Airport	Khartoum	15°35′22″N 032°33′11″E	
HSSN		New Khartoum International Airport	Khartoum	15°15′56″N 032°21′35″E	Not yet open
HSSP		Port Sudan Military Airport	Port Sudan	19°34′39″N 037°12′57″E	
HSSW	WHF	Wadi Halfa Airport	Wadi Halfa	21°48′00″N 031°31′00″E	
HSWD	DNI	Wad Medani Airport	Wad Madani	15°23′15″N 036°19′44″E	Closed
HSWS		Wadi Seidna Air Base	Omdurman	15°49′00″N 032°30′55″E	
HSZA	ZLX	Zalingei Airport	Zalingei	12°56′40″N 023°33′47″E	

=== South Sudan ===
See the section for South Sudan above.

== HT - Tanzania ==
Also see airport category and list.

ICAO	IATA	Airport name	Community	Coordinates
HTAR	ARK	Arusha Airport	Arusha	03°22′00″S 036°37′19″E
HTBU	BKZ	Bukoba Airport	Bukoba	01°19′50″S 031°49′10″E
HTDA	DAR	Julius Nyerere International Airport	Dar es Salaam	06°52′41″S 039°12′10″E
HTDO	DOD	Dodoma Airport	Dodoma	06°10′13″S 035°44′58″E
HTGE	GIT	Geita Airport	Chato	02°44′32″S 031°42′24″E
HTGW		Songwe Airport	Mbeya	08°55′10″S 033°16′25″E
HTIR	IRI	Iringa Airport	Iringa	07°40′10″S 035°45′05″E
HTKA	TKQ	Kigoma Airport	Kigoma	04°53′10″S 029°40′15″E
HTKI	KIY	Kilwa Masoko Airport	Kilwa Masoko	08°54′40″S 039°30′30″E
HTKJ	JRO	Kilimanjaro International Airport	Mount Kilimanjaro	03°25′46″S 037°04′28″E
HTLD		Loliondo Airstrip	Loliondo	02°04′11″S 035°32′45″E
HTLI	LDI	Lindi Kikwetu Airport	Lindi	09°51′01″S 039°45′41″E
HTLM	LKY	Lake Manyara Airport	Lake Manyara	03°22′35″S 035°49′05″E
HTMA	MFA	Mafia Airport	Mafia Island	07°54′50″S 039°40′00″E
HTMB	MBI	Mbeya Airport	Mbeya	08°55′10″S 033°27′50″E
HTMD	MWN	Mwadui Airport	Mwadui	03°31′10″S 033°37′00″E
HTME		Matambwe Airport	Matambwe	07°31′44″S 037°45′43″E
HTMG		Morogoro Airstrip	Morogoro	06°47′50″S 037°39′11″E
HTMI	XMI	Masasi Airport	Masasi	10°44′20″S 038°46′20″E
HTMK		Kikoboga Airstrip	Mikumi National Park	07°19′50″S 037°06′50″E
HTMO		Mombo Airstrip	Mombo	04°53′57″S 038°14′25″E
HTMP	NPY	Mpanda Airport	Mpanda	06°21′20″S 031°04′50″E
HTMR		Msembe Airstrip	Ruaha National Park	07°41′05″S 034°55′20″E
HTMS	QSI	Moshi Airport	Moshi	03°21′45″S 037°19′35″E
HTMT	MYW	Mtwara Airport	Mtwara	10°20′10″S 040°10′55″E
HTMU	MUZ	Musoma Airport	Musoma	01°30′10″S 033°48′08″E
HTMW	MWZ	Mwanza Airport	Mwanza	02°26′40″S 032°56′00″E
HTNA	NCH	Nachingwea Airport	Nachingwea	10°21′25″S 038°46′45″E
HTNG		Ngerengere Air Force Base	Ngerengere	06°43′02″S 038°09′14″E
HTNJ	JOM	Njombe Airport	Njombe	09°21′25″S 034°46′27″E
HTNR		Ngara Airport	Ngara	02°32′30″S 030°42′10″E
HTPE	PMA	Pemba Airport	Pemba	05°15′30″S 039°48′40″E
HTSD		Singida Airstrip	Singida	04°48′40″S 034°43′30″E
HTSE		Same Airstrip	Same	04°03′13″S 037°47′25″E
HTSN	SEU	Seronera Airport	Seronera	02°27′25″S 034°49′17″E
HTSO	SGX	Songea Airport	Songea	10°41′00″S 035°35′00″E
HTSU	SUT	Sumbawanga Airport	Sumbawanga	07°56′56″S 031°36′37″E
HTSY	SHY	Shinyanga Airport	Shinyanga	03°36′35″S 033°30′15″E
HTTB	TBO	Tabora Airport	Tabora	05°04′34″S 032°49′50″E
HTTG	TGT	Tanga Airport	Tanga	05°05′32″S 039°04′18″E
HTWK		West Kilimanjaro Airstrip	Kilimanjaro National Park	03°03′15″S 036°59′55″E
HTZA	ZNZ	Abeid Amani Karume International Airport	Zanzibar	06°13′20″S 039°13′30″E

== HU - Uganda ==
Also see airport category and list.

ICAO	IATA	Airport name	Community	Coordinates	Notes
HUAJ		Adjumani Airport	Adjumani	03°20′21″N 031°45′53″E	
HUAR	RUA	Arua Airport	Arua	03°02′50″N 030°54′44″E	
HUBU		Bundibugyo Airport	Bundibugyo	00°40′15″N 030°01′35″E	
HUEN	EBB	Entebbe International Airport	Entebbe (near Kampala)	00°02′33″N 032°26′37″E	
HUFP		Fort Portal Airport	Fort Portal	00°42′32″N 030°14′53″E	
HUGG		Bugungu Airport		02°12′10″N 031°33′16″E	
HUGU	ULU	Gulu Airport	Gulu	02°48′20″N 032°16′18″E	
HUJI	JIN	Jinja Airport	Jinja	00°27′11″N 033°11′34″E	
HUKB		Kabale Airport	Kabale	01°13′34″S 029°57′36″E	
HUKC		Kampala Airport	Kampala	00°19′35″N 032°35′36″E	Closed
HUKD		Kidepo Airport	Kidepo Valley National Park	03°43′09″N 033°45′15″E	
HUKI	KXO	Kisoro Airport	Kisoro	01°16′48″S 029°43′09″E	
HUKJ	KJJ	Kajjansi Airport	Kajjansi	00°11′48″N 032°33′09″E	
HUKK		Kakira Airport	Karira	00°29′56″N 033°16′57″E	
HUKO		Kotido Airport	Kotido	02°57′06″N 034°07′21″E	
HUKS	KSE	Kasese Airport	Kasese	00°10′59″N 030°06′05″E	
HUKT		Kitgum Airport	Kitgum	03°16′43″N 032°53′24″E	
HULA		Kasenyi Airport	Kasenyi	00°01′45″S 030°08′28″E	
HULI		Lira Airport	Lira	02°14′52″N 032°54′35″E	
HUMA	MBQ	Mbarara Airport	Mbarara	00°33′19″S 030°35′58″E	
HUMI	KCU	Masindi Airport	Masindi	01°45′29″N 031°44′12″E	
HUMO		Moroto Airport	Moroto Town	02°30′18″N 034°35′41″E	
HUMW		Mweya Airport	Mweya	00°11′34″S 029°53′45″E	
HUNA		Namulonge Airport	Namulonge	00°30′51″N 032°37′48″E	
HUNK		Nakasongola Airport	Nakasongola	01°24′28″N 032°27′51″E	
HUPA	PAF	Pakuba Airfield	Pakuba	02°19′35″N 031°29′52″E	
HUSO	SRT	Soroti Airport	Soroti	01°43′39″N 033°37′22″E	
HUTO	TRY	Tororo Airport	Tororo	00°40′48″N 034°10′05″E	
