= List of airports in Kenya =

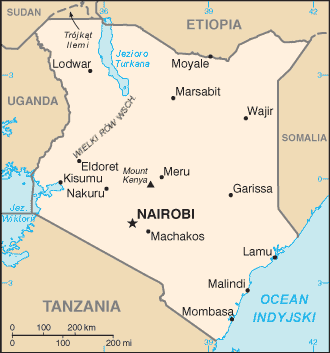
Map of Kenya

This is a list of airports in Kenya, grouped by type and sorted by location.

== Airports ==
Airport names shown in bold indicate the airport has scheduled passenger service on commercial airlines

City served	County	ICAO	IATA	Airport name	Coordinates	Elev. (ft)
**International Civil airports**
**Nairobi**	Nairobi County	HKJK	NBO	**Jomo Kenyatta International Airport**	01°19′07″S 36°55′33″E	5,530 ft
**Nairobi**	Nairobi County	HKNW	WIL	**Wilson Airport**	01°19′12″S 36°48′54″E	5,546 ft
**Mombasa**	Mombasa County	HKMO	MBA	**Moi International Airport**	04°02′24″S 39°35′24″E	200 ft
**Malindi**	Kilifi County	HKML	MYD	**Malindi Airport**	03°12′54″S 40°06′00″E	80 ft
**Kisumu**	Kisumu County	HKKI	KIS	**Kisumu International Airport**	00°05′10″S 34°43′44″E	3,796 ft
**Eldoret**	Uasin Gishu County	HKEL	EDL	**Eldoret International Airport**	00°24′16″N 35°14′20″E	7,050 ft
Lokichogio	Turkana County	HKLK	LKG	Lokichogio Airport	04°12′18″N 034°20′42″E	2,115 ft
**Wajir**	Wajir County	HKWJ	WJR	**Wajir Airport**	01°43′48″N 40°05′24″E	757 ft
Isiolo, Meru	Isiolo County	HKIS		Isiolo Airport	00°20′37″N 37°35′16″E	3,501 ft
**Local Civilian Airports**
**Diani**	Kwale County	HKUK	UKA	**Ukunda Airport**	4°17′49″S 39°34′17″E	98 ft
**Vipingo**	Kilifi County	HKVG	VPG	**Vipingo Airport**	3°48′59.7″S 39°47′43.3″E	86 ft
Mombasa	Mombasa County	HKBM	BMQ	Bamburi Airport	03°58′48″S 39°43′48″E	78 ft
**Lamu**	Lamu County	HKLU	LAU	**Manda Airport**	02°14′46″S 40°54′36″E	20 ft
**Amboseli**	Kajiado County	HKAM	ASV	**Amboseli Airport**	02°38′32″S 037°15′00″E	3,757 ft
Eliye Springs	Turkana County	HKES	EYS	Eliye Springs Airport	3°14′11″N 35°58′31″E	1,395 ft
Hola	Tana River County	HKHO	HOA	Hola Airport	01°31′12″S 40°00′14″E	194 ft
**Nanyuki**	Laikipia County	HKNL	NYK	**Nanyuki Airport**	00°03′40″S 37°02′31″E	6,250 ft
**Kakamega**	Kakamega County	HKKG	GGM	**Kakamega Airport**	00°16′12″N 34°47′00″E	5,020 ft
**Garissa**	Garissa County	HKGA	GAS	**Garissa Airport**	00°28′07″S 39°38′58″E	476 ft
**Kitale**	Trans-Nzoia County	HKKT	KTL	**Kitale Airport**	00°58′30″N 34°57′36″E	6,070 ft
**Lodwar**	Turkana County	HKLO	LOK	**Lodwar Airport**	03°07′20″N 35°36′36″E	1,715 ft
**Kalokol**	Turkana County	HKFG	KLK	**Kalokol Airport**	03°29′24″N 35°50′24″E	1,245 ft
**Kericho**	Kericho County	HKKR	KEY	**Kericho Airport**	00°23′06″S 35°14′42″E	7,165 ft
Kilaguni	Taita-Taveta County	HKKL	ILU	Kilaguni Airport	02°54′00″S 38°04′26″E	2,750 ft
Marsabit	Marsabit County	HKMB	RBT	Marsabit Airport	02°20′42″N 38°00′00″E	4,390 ft
**Maasai Mara**	Narok County	HKKE	KEU	**Keekorok Airport**	01°35′09″S 35°15′06″E	5,801 ft
**Maasai Mara**	Narok County	OLX	HKOK	**Ol Kiombo Airport**		
**Maasai Mara**	Narok County	MDR	HKMZ	**Musiara Airport**		
**Maasai Mara**	Narok County	KTJ	HKTB	**Kichwa Tembo Airport**		
**Maasai Mara**	Narok County	HKR	HKMF	**Maasai Mara North Airport**		
**Masai Mara**	Narok County	HKMS	MRE	**Mara Serena Airport**	01°24′18″S 35°00′36″E	5,600 ft
Loiyangalani	Marsabit County	HKLY	LOY	Loiyangalani Airport	02°46′07″N 36°43′00″E	1,194 ft
Mandera	Mandera County	HKMA	NDE	Mandera Airport	03°56′15″N 41°50′55″E	758 ft
Moyale	Marsabit County	HKMY	OYL	Moyale Airport (Moyale Lower Airport)	03°27′54″N 039°06′18″E	2,790 ft
Nakuru	Nakuru County	HKNK	NUU	Nakuru Airport	00°17′59″S 036°09′38″E	6,234 ft
Nyeri	Nyeri County	HKNI	NYE	Nyeri Airport	00°22′17″S 036°58′53″E	5,830 ft
**Samburu**	Samburu County	HKSB	UAS	**Samburu Airport**	00°31′09″N 37°31′48″E	3,294 ft
**Meru National Park**	Meru County	HKMK	JJM	**Mulika Lodge Airport**	00°09′54″N 38°11′42″E	2,230 ft
Homa Bay	Homa Bay County	HKHB		Homa Bay Airport	0°35′30″S 34°28′48″E	4,242 ft
Kisii	Kisii County	HKKS		Kisii Airport	00°40′21″S 34°41′20″E	4,898 ft
Garba Tula	Isiolo County	HKGT		Garba Tula Airport	00°31′12″N 38°30′56″E	2,000 ft
Maralal	Samburu County	HKMI		Kisima Airport	00°57′00″N 36°48′00″E	5,942 ft
Kakuma	Turkana County	HKKM		Kakuma Airport	3°42′18″N 34°52′17″E	
Bungoma	Bungoma County	HKBU		Bungoma Airport	00°34′35″N 34°33′05″E	4,720 ft
Bura	Tana River County	HKBR		Bura East Airport	01°11′06″S 39°48′50″E	344 ft
Busia	Busia County	HKBA		Busia Airport	00°27′20″N 34°07′48″E	3,990 ft
Embu	Embu County	HKEM		Embu Airport	00°34′08″S 37°29′32″E	4,150 ft
Lokitaung	Turkana County	HKLG		Lokitaung Airport	04°19′12″N 35°41′24″E	1,804 ft
Mackinnon Road	Kwale County	HKMR		Mackinnon Road Airport	03°44′00″S 39°02′42″E	1,181 ft
Magadi	Kajiado County	HKMG		Magadi Airport	01°56′49″S 36°16′48″E	2,100 ft
Makindu	Makueni County	HKMU		Makindu Airport	02°17′33″S 37°49′36″E	3,300 ft
**Migori**	Migori County	HKMM		**Migori Airport**	01°06′56″S 034°29′07″E	2,690 ft
Mtito Andei	Makueni County	HKMT		Mtito Andei Airport	02°42′00″S 38°10′27″E	2,398 ft
Naivasha	Nakuru County	HKNV		Naivasha Airport	00°47′06″S 36°26′02″E	6,380 ft
Narok	Narok County	HKNO		Narok Airport	01°09′00″S 35°46′01″E	6,070 ft
Olooloitikosh	Kajiado County	HKIK		Orly Airpark	1°34′50″S 36°48′38″E	
Voi	Taita-Taveta County	HKVO		Voi Airport	03°21′44″S 38°31′54″E	1,900 ft
Eldoret	Uasin Gishu County	HKED		Eldoret Airstrip	0°32′14″N 35°17′5″E	
Kiwayu	Lamu County		KWY	Kiwayu Airport	01°57′38″S 041°17′51″E	23 ft
Lake Baringo	Baringo County		LBN	Lake Baringo Airport	0°40′10″N 36°6′12″E	
Liboi	Garissa County		LBK	Liboi Airport	00°21′14″N 40°52′40″E	320 ft
Kimwarer	Elgeyo-Marakwet County		KRV	Kimwarer Airport	00°19′12″N 35°39′54″E	4,701 ft
**Angama Mara**	Narok County		ANA	**Angama Mara Airport**	01°16′18″S 34°57′38″E	6,171 ft
**Lewa Downs**	Meru County			**Lewa Airport**	00°11′34″N 37°28′21″E	5,500 ft
Loitokitok	Kajiado County			Loitokitok Airport	02°54′25″S 37°31′17″E	5,322 ft
Tatu City	Kiambu County			Tatu City Airstrip	1°8′41″S 36°55′10″E	
**Military airports**
Nairobi	Nairobi County	HKRE		Moi Air Base	1°16′37.9″S 036°51′44.3″E	5,354 ft
Nanyuki	Laikipia County	HKNY		Laikipia Air Base	00°01′51″N 037°01′31″E	6,119 ft

== See also ==
- Transport in Kenya
- List of airports by ICAO code: H#HK - Kenya
- Wikipedia: WikiProject Aviation/Airline destination lists: Africa#Kenya
