= Garba Tula Airport =

Garba Tula
- IATA: n/a; ICAO: HKGT

Summary
- Airport type: Public, Civilian
- Owner: Kenya Airports Authority
- Serves: Garba Tula, Kenya
- Location: Garba Tula, Kenya
- Elevation AMSL: 2,000 ft / 610 m
- Coordinates: 00°31′12″N 38°30′56″E

Map
- Location of Garba Tula Airport in Kenya; Placement on map is approximate

Runways
Direction	Length		Surface
Direction	ft	m	Surface
02/20	3,280	1,000	Unpaved

Garba Tula Airport is an airport in Kenya.

== Location ==
Garba Tula Airport (IATA: n/a, ICAO: HKGT) is located in Garba Tula District, Eastern Province, in the northeastern part of Kenya, near the town of Garba Tula.

Its location lies approximately 271 kilometres (168 mi), by air, northeast of Nairobi International Airport, the country's largest civilian airport. The geographic coordinates of this airport are: 0° 31' 12.00"N, 38° 30' 56.00"E (Latitude:0.520000; Longitude:38.515555).

== Overview ==
Garba Tula Airport is a small civilian airport, serving Garba Tula and surrounding communities. Situated 610 metres (2,000 ft) above sea level, the airport has a single unpaved runway 02/20 that measures 3,280 feet (1,000 m) long.

== Airlines and destinations ==
None at the moment

== See also ==
- Garba Tula
- Garba Tula District
- Eastern Province (Kenya)
- Kenya Airports Authority
- Kenya Civil Aviation Authority
- List of airports in Kenya
