= Loiyangalani Airport =

- IATA: LOY; ICAO: HKLY

Summary
- Airport type: Public, Civilian
- Owner: Kenya Civil Aviation Authority
- Serves: Loiyangalani, Kenya
- Location: Loiyangalani, Kenya
- Elevation AMSL: 1,194 ft / 364 m
- Coordinates: 02°46′07″N 36°43′00″E

Map
- Location of Loiyangalani Airport in Kenya; Placement on map is approximate

Runways
Direction	Length		Surface
Direction	ft	m	Surface
16/34	3,699	1,127	Bitumen

Loiyangalani Airport is an airport in Loiyangalani, Kenya.

== Location ==
Loiyangalani Airport (IATA: LOY, ICAO: HKLY) is located in Marsabit County, Eastern Province, in the town of Loiyangalani, in the northwestern part of the Republic of Kenya, on the eastern shores of Lake Turkana.

Its location is approximately 441 kilometres (274 mi) north of Nairobi International Airport, the country's largest civilian airport. The geographic coordinates of Loiyangalani Airport are:2° 46' 7.00"N, 36° 43' 0.00"E (Latitude:2.768610; Longitude:36.716667).

== Overview ==
Loiyangalani Airport is a civilian airport that serves the town of Loiyangalani and surrounding communities. Situated at 1,194 feet (364 m) above sea level, the airport has a single broken bitumen and stone runway which is 3,699 feet (1,127 m) long and 65 feet (20 m) wide.

== Airlines and destinations ==
At this time, there is no regular, scheduled airline service to Loiyangalani Airport.

== See also ==
- Kenya Airports Authority
- Kenya Civil Aviation Authority
- List of airports in Kenya
