= Magadi Airport =

- IATA: n/a; ICAO: HKMG

Summary
- Airport type: Public, Civilian
- Owner: Kenya Airports Authority
- Serves: Magadi, Kenya
- Location: Magadi, Kenya
- Elevation AMSL: 2,100 ft / 640 m
- Coordinates: 01°56′49″S 36°16′48″E

Map
- Location of Magadi Airport in Kenya; Placement on map is approximate

Runways
Direction	Length		Surface
Direction	ft	m	Surface
02/20	5,741	1,750	Unpaved

Magadi Airport is an airport near Magadi, Kenya.

== Location ==
Magadi Airport (IATA: n/a, ICAO: HKMG) is located in the Magadi Division of Kajiado County, in southern Kenya, near the town of Magadi on the eastern shores of Lake Magadi, close to the International border with the Republic of Tanzania.

Its location is approximately 97 kilometres (60 mi), by air, southwest of Nairobi International Airport, the country's largest civilian airport. The geographic coordinates of this airport are: 01° 56' 49.2360" S, 036° 16' 48.0072" E (Latitude:-01.9470100; Longitude:036.2800020).

== Overview ==
Magadi Airport is a small civilian airport, serving the town of Magadi and the surrounding communities. Situated 640 metres (2,100 ft) above sea level, the airport has a single unpaved runway that measures 5,741 feet (1,750 m) long.

== Airlines and destinations ==
At this time, there is no regular, scheduled airline service to Magadi Airport.

== See also ==
- Kenya Airports Authority
- Kenya Civil Aviation Authority
- List of airports in Kenya
