= Mackinnon Road Airport =

- IATA: n/a; ICAO: HKMR

Summary
- Airport type: Public, Civilian
- Owner: Kenya Airports Authority
- Serves: Mackinnon Road, Kenya
- Location: Mackinnon Road, Kenya
- Elevation AMSL: 1,181 ft (360 m)
- Coordinates: 03°44′00″S 39°02′42″E

Map
- Location of Mackinnon Road Airport in Kenya; Placement on map is approximate

Runways
Direction	Length		Surface
Direction	ft	m	Surface
12/30	3,707	1,130	Unpaved

Mackinnon Road Airport (IATA: n/a, ICAO: HKMR) is an airport in Mackinnon Road, Kenya.

== Location ==
Mackinnon Road Airport is located in Taita-Taveta County, in the town of Mackinnon Road, in southeastern Kenya, close to the International border with the Republic of Tanzania and to the eastern coast of Kenya, on the shores of the Indian Ocean. The airport lies just below the southern tip of Tsavo East National Park.

Its location is approximately 357 kilometres (222 mi), by air, southeast of Nairobi International Airport, the country's largest civilian airport. Makinnon Road Airport is located approximately 70 kilometres (43 mi), by air, northwest of Moi International Airport, the nearest International Airport.

== Overview ==
Mackinnon Road Airport is a small airport that serves the town of Mackinnon Road and the adjacent Tsavo National Park. Situated at 1,181 feet (360 m) above sea level, the airport has a single unpaved runway that is 3,707 feet (1,130 m) long and 98 feet (30 m) wide.

== Airlines and destinations ==
At the moment there are no regular, scheduled airline services to Mackinnon Road Airport.

== See also ==
- Tsavo National Park
- Kenya Civil Aviation Authority
- List of airports in Kenya
