= Kimwarer Airport =

- IATA: none; ICAO: none

Summary
- Airport type: Public, Civilian
- Owner: Kenya Airports Authority
- Serves: Kimwarer, Kenya
- Location: Kimwarer, Kenya
- Elevation AMSL: 4,701 ft / 1,433 m
- Coordinates: 00°19′12″N 35°39′54″E

Map
- Location of Kimwarer Airport in Kenya; Placement on map is approximate

Runways
| Direction | Length | | Surface |
| Direction | ft | m | Surface |
|---|---|---|---|
| 01/19 | 3,200 | 980 | Unpaved |

Kimwarer Airport is an airport in Kenya.

== Location ==
Kimwarer Airport is located in Elgeyo-Marakwet County in the village of Kimwarer, in the southwestern part of Kenya on the map.

Its location is approximately 250 kilometres (160 mi), by air, northwest of Nairobi International Airport, the country's largest civilian airport. The geographic coordinates of this airport are:0° 19' 12.00"N, 35° 39' 54.00"E (Latitude:0.32000; Longitude:35.665000).

== Overview ==
Kimwarer Airport is a small civilian airport, serving the village of Kimwarer and surrounding communities. The airport is situated 4,701 feet (1,433 m) above sea level. Kimwarer Airport has a single unpaved runway that is 3,200 feet (980 m) long.

== Airlines and destinations ==
There is no regular, scheduled airline service to Nakuru Airport at this time.

== See also ==
- Kenya Airports Authority
- Kenya Civil Aviation Authority
- List of airports in Kenya
