= Kalokol Airport =

Kalokol Airport Fergusons Gulf
- IATA: KLK; ICAO: HKFG

Summary
- Airport type: Public, Civilian
- Owner: Kenya Airports Authority
- Serves: Kalokol
- Location: Kalokol, Kenya
- Elevation AMSL: 1,245 ft / 379 m
- Coordinates: 03°29′24″N 35°50′24″E

Map
- Location of Kalokol Airport in Kenya; Placement on map is approximate

Runways
Direction	Length		Surface
Direction	ft	m	Surface
12-30	3,281	1,000	Asphalt

Kalokol Airport (IATA: KLK, ICAO: HKFG), also named Fergusons Gulf Airport, is an airport located in Kalokol, a village in Turkana County in northwestern Kenya, on the western shores of Lake Turkana, close to the International border with Ethiopia.

By air, Kalokol airport is situated approximately 552 kilometres (343 mi) northwest of Nairobi International Airport, Kenya's largest civilian airport. The geographic coordinates of this airport are:3° 29' 24.00"N, 35° 50' 24.00"E (Latitude:3.490000; Longitude:35.840000).

== Overview ==
Kalokol Airport is a small civilian airport, serving the village of Kalokol. Situated at 1,245 feet (379 m) above sea level, the airport has a single asphalt runway 12-30 measuring 3,281 feet (1,000 m) in length.

== Airlines and destinations ==
None at the moment.

== See also ==
- Kenya Airports Authority
- Kenya Civil Aviation Authority
- List of airports in Kenya
