= Keekorok Airport =

Airport in Kenya

Keekorock Airport
- IATA: KEU; ICAO: HKKE

Summary
- Airport type: Public, Civilian
- Owner: Kenya Airports Authority
- Serves: Keekorok, Kenya
- Location: Masai Mara, Kenya
- Elevation AMSL: 5,801 ft / 1,768 m
- Coordinates: 01°35′09″S 35°15′06″E

Map
- Location of Keekorok Airport in Kenya; Placement on map is approximate

Runways
Direction	Length		Surface
Direction	ft	m	Surface
09/27	4,200	1,280	Unpaved

Keekorok Airport (IATA: KEU, ICAO: HKKE) is an airport in Masai Mara, Kenya.

== Location ==
Keekorok Airport is located in Masai Mara, in Narok County, in southwestern Kenya, close to the International border with the Republic of Tanzania, near the location called Keekorok.

By air, Keekorok Airport lies approximately 225 kilometres (140 mi) west of Nairobi International Airport, Kenya's largest civilian airport. The geographical coordinates of this airport are:1° 35' 9.00"S, +35° 15' 6.00"E (Latitude:-1.585832; Longitude:35.251667).

== Overview ==
Keekorok Airport is a small civilian airport, serving Keekorok in Masai Mara and the neighbouring communities. Situated at 1,768 metres (5,801 ft) above sea level, the airport has one unpaved runway measuring 1,280 metres (4,200 ft) in length.

== Airlines and destinations ==
Airlines	Destinations
748 Air Services	Nairobi–Wilson
Airkenya Express	Nairobi–Wilson
Mombasa Air Safari	Mombasa
Safarilink	Nairobi–Wilson

== See also ==
- Kenya Airports Authority
- Kenya Civil Aviation Authority
- List of airports in Kenya
