= Kericho Airport =

- IATA: KEY; ICAO: HKKR

Summary
- Airport type: Public, Civilian
- Owner: Kenya Airports Authority
- Serves: Kericho, Kenya
- Location: Kericho, Kenya
- Elevation AMSL: 7,165 ft / 2,184 m
- Coordinates: 00°23′06″S 35°14′42″E

Map
- Location of Kericho Airport in Kenya; Placement on map is approximate

Runways
Direction	Length		Surface
Direction	ft	m	Surface
04-22	3,890	1,185	Unpaved

Kericho Airport is an airport in Kenya.

== Location ==
Kericho Airport (IATA: KEY, ICAO: HKKR) is located in Kericho District, Rift Valley Province, in the town of Kericho, in the southwestern part of Kenya on the map.

Its location is approximately 206 kilometres (128 mi), by air, northwest of Nairobi International Airport, the country's largest civilian airport. The geographic coordinates of this airport are:0° 23' 6.00"S, +35° 14' 42.00"E (Latitude:-0.3850000; Longitude:35.245000).

== Overview ==
Kericho Airport is a small civilian airport, serving the border town of Kericho and surrounding communities. The airport is situated 2,184 metres (7,165 ft) above sea level. It has a single unpaved runway 04-22 that is 1,184 metres (3,885 ft) long.

== Airlines and destinations ==
There is no regular, scheduled airline service to Kericho Airport at this time.

== See also ==
- Kericho
- Kericho District
- Rift Valley Province
- Kenya Airports Authority
- Kenya Civil Aviation Authority
- List of airports in Kenya
