= Nakuru Airport =

Airport in Nakuru, Kenya

- IATA: NUU; ICAO: HKNK

Summary
- Airport type: Public, Military, Civilian
- Owner: Kenya Airports Authority
- Serves: Nakuru, Kenya
- Location: Kenya
- Elevation AMSL: 1,900 m / 6,234 ft
- Coordinates: 00°17′59″S 036°09′38″E

Map
- Location of the airport in Kenya

Runways
Direction	Length		Surface
Direction	m	ft	Surface
14/32	1,709	5,607	Asphalt
- Sources: GCM, STV

Nakuru Airport (IATA: NUU, ICAO: HKNK), also referred to as Lanet Military Airstrip, is an airport in the town of Nakuru, in Nakuru County, Kenya. Its location is approximately 150 kilometres (93 mi), by air, northwest of the Jomo Kenyatta International Airport, the country's largest civilian airport. In 2020, the County Government of Nakuru announced a KES 3 billion upgrade of the facility which was to be carried out in two phases, beginning by the end of the year, in efforts to open up the region to increased tourism and horticultural exports.

== Upgrade ==
In July 2020, the Nakuru County Government announced that Lanet Military Airstrip would undergo a KES 3 billion shilling expansion. The project, set to transform the facility into a 'modern international airport', will be implemented in two phases. The initial phase would include the construction of a terminal building, a military lounge, a 1.7 km runway and taxiways, as well as the rehabilitation of the current runway to bitumen standards.

The second phase of construction would focus on expansion of the airport's facilities, with the primary aim of allowing the airport to accommodate much larger aircraft.

Other than opening up the region's economy to more horticultural export and tourism, the airport will also aim to be an emergency landing option for the country's biggest airport, Jomo Kenyatta International Airport, of which it would be the closest international facility.

== See also ==
- Kenya Airports Authority
- Kenya Civil Aviation Authority
- List of airports in Kenya
