= Nyeri Airport =

- IATA: NYE; ICAO: HKNI

Summary
- Airport type: Public, Civilian
- Owner: Kenya Airports Authority
- Serves: Nyeri, Kenya
- Location: Nyeri, Kenya
- Elevation AMSL: 5,830 ft / 1,777 m
- Coordinates: 00°22′17″S 036°58′53″E

Map
- Location of the airport in Kenya

Runways
Direction	Length		Surface
Direction	ft	m	Surface
16/34	4,050	1,230	Unpaved

Nyeri Airport (IATA: NYE, ICAO: HKNI) is an airport in Nyeri County, Kenya.

== Location ==
Nyeri Airport is located 6.5 kilometres (4.0 mi) the northeast of Nyeri, in the Kenyan Central Highlands.

Its location is approximately 91 kilometres (57 mi), by air, north of Nairobi's Jomo Kenyatta International Airport, the country's largest civilian airport. The geographic coordinates of this airport are:0° 20' 24.00"S, 36° 54' 36.00"E (Latitude:-0.34000; Longitude:36.91000).

== Overview ==
Nyeri Airport is a small civilian airport, serving the Central Highlands town of Nyeri and surrounding communities. The airport is situated 1,777 metres (5,830 ft) above sea level, and has a single recently paved runway measuring 4,050 feet (1,230 m) in length. The airport is due to undergo development with the building of a terminal building and increase of the runway length to 2000m under the new county government. Kenyan Air Force FOB Nyeri is located near Nyeri Airport, and there may be Kenyan Air Force assets situated in the perimeter.

== Airlines and destinations ==
There is no regular, scheduled airline service to Nyeri Airport at this time.

== See also ==
- Kenya Airports Authority
- Kenya Civil Aviation Authority
- List of airports in Kenya
