= Bura East Airport =

- IATA: n/a; ICAO: HKBR

Summary
- Airport type: Public, Civilian
- Owner: Kenya Civil Aviation Authority
- Serves: Bura, Kenya
- Location: Bura, Kenya
- Elevation AMSL: 344 ft / 105 m
- Coordinates: 01°11′06″S 39°48′50″E

Map
- Location of Bura East Airport in Kenya; Placement on map is approximate

Runways
Direction	Length		Surface
Direction	ft	m	Surface
17–35	3,280	1,000	Unpaved

Bura East Airport is an airport in Kenya.

== Location ==
Bura East Airport (IATA: n/a, ICAO: HKBR) is located in the town of Bura, Tana River County, in southeastern Kenya, close to the Indian Ocean coast and to the International border with Somalia.

Its location is approximately 340 kilometres (210 mi), by air, east of Nairobi International Airport, the country's largest civilian airport. The geographic coordinates of this airport are:1° 11' 6.00"S, 39° 48' 50.00"E (Latitude: -1.185000; Longitude:39.813890).

== Overview ==
Bura East Airport is a small airport that serves the town of Bura, Tana. At the moment, there is no scheduled airline service to Bura East Airport. Situated at 105 metres (344 ft) above sea level, the airport has a single unpaved runway 17–35, length 1000 m.

== Airlines and destinations ==
None at the moment.

== See also ==
- Bura, Tana
- Tana River District
- Coast Province
- Kenya Airports Authority
- Kenya Civil Aviation Authority
- List of airports in Kenya
