= Kakamega Airport =

Airport in Kakamega, Kenya

- IATA: GGM; ICAO: HKKG

Summary
- Airport type: Public, Civilian
- Owner: Kenya Airports Authority
- Serves: Kakamega, Kenya
- Location: Kakamega, Kenya
- Elevation AMSL: 5,020 ft / 1,530 m
- Coordinates: 00°16′12″N 34°47′00″E

Map
- Location of Kakakamega Airport in Kenya; Placement on map is approximate

Runways
Direction	Length		Surface
Direction	ft	m	Surface
08-26	4,200	1,280	Asphalt (49 ft or 15 m wide)

Kakamega Airport is a small airport in Kenya. It serves the town of Kakamega. At 1,530 metres (5,020 ft) above sea level, the airport has a single asphalt runway which measures 4,200 feet (1,300 m) in length and 49 feet (15 m) in width.

== Location ==
Kakamega Airport (IATA: GGM, ICAO: HKKG) is in Kakamega County in the town of Kakamega, in western Kenya, close to the international border with the Republic of Uganda.

It is approximately 301 kilometres (187 mi) by air northwest of Nairobi International Airport, the country's largest civilian airport. The geographic coordinates of this airport are 0° 16' 12.00"N, 34° 47' 0.00"E (Latitude: 0.270000; Longitude: 34.783332).

The airport currently receives weekly flights by SkyWard Express from Wilson airport (Nairobi).

== See also ==
- Kenya Airports Authority
- Kenya Civil Aviation Authority
- List of airports in Kenya
