= Lokitaung Airport =

Lodwar Airport
- IATA: n/a; ICAO: HKLG

Summary
- Airport type: Public, Civilian
- Owner: Kenya Civil Aviation Authority
- Serves: Lokitaung, Kenya
- Location: Lokitaung, Kenya
- Elevation AMSL: 1,804 ft / 550 m
- Coordinates: 04°19′12″N 35°41′24″E

Map
- Location of Lokitaung Airport in Kenya; Placement on map is approximate

Runways
Direction	Length		Surface
Direction	ft	m	Surface
09/27	2,450 - 2,950	750 - 900	Unpaved

Lokitaung Airport is an airport in Lokitaung, Kenya.

== Location ==
Lokitaung Airport (IATA: n/a, ICAO: HKLG) is located in Turkana County, in the town of Lokitaung, in the northwestern part of the Republic of Kenya, close to the International borders with Ethiopia and South Sudan.

Its location is approximately 635 kilometres (395 mi), by air, northwest of Nairobi International Airport, the country's largest civilian airport. The geographic coordinates of Lodwar Airport are:4° 19' 12.00"N, 35° 41' 24.00"E (Latitude:4.320000; Longitude:35.690000).

== Overview ==
Lokitaung Airport is a civilian airport that serves the town of Lokitaung and surrounding communities. Situated at 1,804 feet (550 m) above sea level, the airport has a single unpaved runway, length poorly marked, but from 750 to 900 meters.

== Airlines and destinations ==
There is no regular, scheduled airline service to Lokitaung Airport at this time.

== See also ==
- Kenya Airports Authority
- Kenya Civil Aviation Authority
- List of airports in Kenya
