= Narok Airport =

- IATA: n/a; ICAO: HKNO

Summary
- Airport type: Public, Civilian
- Owner: Kenya Airports Authority
- Serves: Narok, Kenya
- Location: Narok, Kenya
- Elevation AMSL: 6,070 ft / 1,850 m
- Coordinates: 01°09′00″S 35°46′01″E

Map
- Location of Narok Airport in Kenya; Placement on map is approximate

Runways
Direction	Length		Surface
Direction	ft	m	Surface
11/29	6,001	1,829	Asphalt

Narok Airport is an airport in Narok, Kenya.

== Location ==
Narok Airport, (IATA: ASV, ICAO: HKNO), is located in Narok County, in the southwestern part of the Republic of Kenya, close to the International border with the Republic of Tanzania. Its location is approximately 131 kilometres (81 mi), by air, west of Nairobi International Airport, the country's largest civilian airport. The geographic coordinates of this airport are:1° 9' 0.00"S, 35° 46' 1.00"E (Latitude: -1.150000; Longitude:35.766945).

== Overview ==
Narok Airport is a small airport that serves the town of Narok and surrounding communities. The airport receives unscheduled service from various aircharter service providers and private airplane owners. Situated 1,850 metres (6,070 ft) above sea level, the airport has a single asphalt runway that measures 1,829 metres (6,001 ft) long.

== Airlines and destinations ==
At the moment there is no regular, scheduled airline service to Narok Airport.

== See also ==
- Kenya Airports Authority
- Kenya Civil Aviation Authority
- List of airports in Kenya
