= Homa Bay Airport =

- IATA: none; ICAO: HKHB

Summary
- Airport type: Public
- Operator: Kenya Airports Authority
- Serves: Homa Bay
- Location: Homa Bay, Homa Bay County, Kenya
- Opened: 28 January 2016
- Elevation AMSL: 4,242 ft / 1,293 m
- Coordinates: 0°35′30″S 34°28′48″E

Map
- Location in Kenya

Runways
Direction	Length		Surface
Direction	ft	m	Surface
14/32	3,937	1,200	Asphalt

Homa Bay Airport (ICAO: HKHB), also known as Kabunde Airstrip, is an airport located 6 km (3.7 mi) from the town of Homa Bay in Homa Bay County, Kenya. It was modernised in 2015 and received its first commercial flights in January 2016.

== History ==
In May 2015, the Kenya Airports Authority started to upgrade the airstrip, one of three airstrips across Kenya to be modernised, the others being Migwena Airstrip and Kisii Airport. The upgrade was carried out to improve air service in the area, as residents previously had to travel to the distant Kisumu International Airport; and to boost tourism and business in the region.

The modernisation cost KSh.200 million/= and was contracted to Glanack Investment Ltd Co. The runway was extended to 1.2 km (0.75 mi) and an apron was constructed. In addition, fencing around the airport was reinforced; and the road between Homa Bay and Rongo, which is used to access the airport, was tarmacked.

In late January 2016, the airport was cleared to receive commercial flights, and a final inspection was carried out on 27 January. The first passenger flights landed at Homa Bay on 28 January 2016.

== Facilities ==
Homa Bay Airport includes an apron and runway 14/32, which in 2015 was extended from 790 m (2,600 ft) to the present 1,200 m (3,900 ft) to accommodate for larger aircraft.

== Airlines and destinations ==
Airlines	Destinations
Renegade Air	Nairobi-Wilson

== See also ==
- Kenya Airports Authority
- Kenya Civil Aviation Authority
- List of airports in Kenya
