= Moyale Airport =

Airport in Moyale, Ethiopia–Kenya border

Moyale Airport Moyale Lower Airport
- IATA: OYL; ICAO: HKMY

Summary
- Airport type: Public, Civilian
- Owner: Kenya Civil Aviation Authority
- Serves: Moyale, Kenya
- Elevation AMSL: 2,790 ft (850 m)
- Coordinates: 03°27′54″N 039°06′18″E

Map
- Location of airport in Kenya

Runways
Direction	Length		Surface
Direction	m	ft	Surface
14/32	1,300	4,265	Asphalt

Moyale Airport (IATA: OYL, ICAO: HKMY), also referred to as Moyale Lower Airport, is an airport located in the town of Moyale, Marsabit County, in the northern part of the Republic of Kenya, at the international border with Ethiopia. Its location is approximately 590 kilometres (370 mi), by air, northeast of Nairobi International Airport, the country's largest civilian airport. The geographic coordinates of this airport are:3° 27' 54.00"N, 39° 6' 18.00"E (Latitude:3.46500; Longitude:39.10500).

== Overview ==
Moyale Airport, Kenya is a civilian airport that serves the town of Moyale and surrounding communities. Situated at 850 metres (2,790 ft) above sea level, the airport has a single asphalt runway which measures 4,265 feet (1,300 m) in length and is of unknown width at this time. At the moment there are no known regular, scheduled, airline services to Moyale Airport, Kenya.

== Airlines and destinations ==
Adeshfly Airlines operated by FLY540

== See also ==
- Kenya Airports Authority
- Kenya Civil Aviation Authority
- List of airports in Kenya
