= Embu Airport =

- IATA: n/a; ICAO: HKEM

Summary
- Airport type: Public, Civilian
- Owner: Kenya Airports Authority
- Operator: Kenya Airports Authority
- Serves: Embu
- Location: Kenya
- Elevation AMSL: 4,150 ft / 1,265 m
- Coordinates: 00°34′08″S 37°29′32″E

Map
- Location of Embu Airport in Kenya; Placement on map is approximate

Runways
Direction	Length		Surface
Direction	ft	m	Surface
14/32	3,250	990	Asphalt

Embu Airport is an airport in Kenya.

== Location ==
Embu Airport, (IATA: n/a, ICAO: HKEM), is located in Embu County, in the town of Embu.

Located about 6.2 kilometres (3.9 mi), by road, southeast of Embu's central business district, the airport lies to the immediate northeast of Don Bosco Boys' Secondary School, on Embu-Kiritiri Road.

This is approximately 144 kilometres (89 mi), by road and 105.5 kilometres (65.6 mi), by air, northeast of Nairobi International Airport, the country's largest civilian airport. The geographic coordinates of this airport are 00°34'08.0"S, 37°29'32.0"E (Latitude:-0.568890; Longitude:37.492221).

== Overview ==
Embu Airport is a small civilian airport, serving the town of Embu and surrounding communities. Situated at 1,265 metres (4,150 ft) above sea level, the airport has a single asphalt runway 14/32, which measures 3,250 feet (990 m) in length.

== Scheduled upgrade ==
In August 2016, Martin Wambora, the Governor of Embu County, announced that the county would, in partnership with the national government and foreign private investors, spend KES:10 billion (approx. US$100 million), to refurbish the airport to international standards, including the following upgrades:

- Lengthen the runway to 4,000 metres (13,000 ft)
- Build new terminal buildings
- Build warehouses
- Build a hangar
- Construct an airport apron.

== See also ==
- Kenya Airports Authority
- Kenya Civil Aviation Authority
- List of airports in Kenya
