= Bungoma Airport =

- IATA: none; ICAO: HKBU

Summary
- Airport type: Public, Civilian
- Owner: Kenya Airports Authority
- Serves: Bungoma, Kenya
- Location: Bungoma, Kenya
- Elevation AMSL: 4,720 ft / 1,440 m
- Coordinates: 00°34′35″N 34°33′05″E

Map
- Location of Bungoma Airport in Kenya; Placement on map is approximate

Runways
| Direction | Length | | Surface |
| Direction | ft | m | Surface |
|---|---|---|---|
| 07/25 | 2,400 | 730 | Asphalt - partial |

Bungoma Airport is an airport in Kenya.

== Location ==
Bungoma Airport (ICAO: HKBU) is located in the town of Bungoma, Bungoma County, in western Kenya, close to the International border with the Republic of Uganda.

Its location is approximately 337 kilometres (209 mi), by air, northwest of Nairobi International Airport, the country's largest civilian airport. The geographic coordinates of this airport are:0° 34' 35.00"N, 34° 33' 5.00"E (Latitude:0.576390; Longitude:34.551390).

== Overview ==
Bungoma Airport is a small airport that serves the town of Bungoma. At the moment, there is no scheduled airline service to Bungoma Airport. Situated at 1,440 metres (4,720 ft) above sea level, the airport has a single asphalt runway 07/25 which measures 730 metres (2,400 ft) in length.

== Airlines and destinations ==
None at the moment.

== See also ==
- Kenya Airports Authority
- Kenya Civil Aviation Authority
- List of airports in Kenya
