= Bamburi Airport =

- IATA: BMQ; ICAO: HKBM

Summary
- Airport type: Public, Civilian
- Owner: Kenya Civil Aviation Authority
- Serves: Bamburi, Kenya
- Location: Bamburi, Kenya
- Elevation AMSL: 78 ft / 24 m
- Coordinates: 03°58′48″S 39°43′48″E

Map
- Location of Bamburi Airport in Kenya (Placement on map is approximate)

Runways
Direction	Length		Surface
Direction	ft	m	Surface
18/36	3,232	985	Asphalt

Bamburi Airport is a small airstrip located near Bamburi, north of Mombasa along Kenya’s coast. It primarily serves private charters and light aircraft, providing convenient access to nearby resorts, beaches, and residential areas. The airstrip has minimal infrastructure and is not used for scheduled commercial flights. Its proximity to Nyali and Mombasa’s North Coast makes it useful for tourism, private transfers, and occasional emergency or logistical operations.

== Location ==
Bamburi Airport (IATA: BMQ) is located in Mombasa County, in the town of Bamburi, in southeastern Kenya, close to the Indian Ocean coast.

Its location is approximately 430 kilometres (270 mi), by air, southeast of Nairobi International Airport, the country's largest civilian airport. The geographic coordinates of this airport are:3° 58' 48.00"S, 39° 43' 48.00"E (Latitude: -3.98000; Longitude:39.73000).

== Overview ==
Bamburi Airport is a small airport that serves the town of Bamburi. At the moment, there is no scheduled airline service to Bamburi Airport. Situated at 78 feet (24 m) above sea level, the airport has a single asphalt runway that measures 985 metres (3,232 ft) in length.

== See also ==
- Bamburi
- Mombasa County
- Coast Province
- Kenya Airports Authority
- Kenya Civil Aviation Authority
- List of airports in Kenya
