= Hola Airport =

- IATA: HOA; ICAO: HKHO

Summary
- Airport type: Public, Civilian
- Owner: Kenya Airports Authority
- Serves: Hola, Kenya
- Location: Hola, Kenya
- Elevation AMSL: 194 ft / 59 m
- Coordinates: 01°31′12″S 40°00′14″E

Map
- Location of Hola Airport in Kenya; Placement on map is approximate

Runways
Direction	Length		Surface
Direction	ft	m	Surface
18-36	2,950	900	Unpaved

Hola Airport is an airport in Kenya.

== Location ==
Hola Airport (IATA: HOA, ICAO: HKHO) is located in the town of Hola, Tana River County, in southeastern Kenya, close to the Indian Ocean coast and to the International border with Somalia.

Its location is approximately 345 kilometres (214 mi), by air, east of Nairobi International Airport, the country's largest civilian airport. The geographic coordinates of this airport are:1° 31' 12.00"S, +40° 0' 14.00"E (Latitude:-1.520000; Longitude:40.003890).

== Overview ==
Hola Airport is a small civilian airport, serving Hola and surrounding communities. Situated at 59 metres (194 ft) above sea level, the airport has a single unpaved runway 18-36 that measures 2,950 feet (900 m) long.

== Airlines and destinations ==
At the moment, there is no regular, scheduled airline service to Hola Airport.

== See also ==
- Kenya Airports Authority
- Kenya Civil Aviation Authority
- List of airports in Kenya
