= Busia Airport =

- IATA: n/a; ICAO: HKBA

Summary
- Airport type: Public, Civilian
- Owner: Kenya Airports Authority
- Serves: Busia, Kenya
- Location: Busia, Kenya
- Elevation AMSL: 3,990 ft (1,220 m)
- Coordinates: 00°27′20″N 34°07′48″E

Map
- Location of Busia Airport in Kenya; Placement on map is approximate

Runways
| Direction | Length | | Surface |
| Direction | ft | m | Surface |
|---|---|---|---|
| 13-31 | 3,281 | 1,000 | Unpaved |

Busia Airport is an airport in Kenya.

== Location ==
Busia Airport (IATA: n/a, ICAO: HKBA) is located in Busia County in the town of Busia, in southwestern Kenya, close to the International border with Uganda.

Its location is approximately 375 kilometres (233 mi), by air, northwest of Nairobi International Airport, the country's largest civilian airport. The geographic coordinates of this airport are:0° 27' 20.02"N, 34° 7' 48.00"E (Latitude:0.45560; Longitude:34.13000).

== Overview ==
Busia Airport is a small civilian airport, serving the border town of Busia, Kenya and surrounding communities. Situated at 1,216 metres (3,990 ft) above sea level, the airport has a single unpaved runway 13-31 which measures 3,281 feet (1,000 m) in length.

== Airlines and destinations ==
There is no regular, scheduled airline service to Busia Airport at this time. Runway unserviceable.

== Accidents and incidents ==
On Friday, 24 January 2003, at about 1645 hours, local time, Gulfstream Aerospace G-159 (G-1) aircraft, owned and operated by African Commuter Services Limited (ACS), crashed on attempted initial takeoff climb from Busia Airport.

The aircraft which carried Kenyan Government officials, had originated from Nairobi and was destined for Kisumu. The aircraft carried three crew members and nine passengers. Two of the crew died, including the captain and one of the passengers, a cabinet minister (Ahmed Khalif, then Minister of Labor) also died. There was no fire but the aircraft was damaged beyond repair and was written off.

== See also ==
- Kenya Airports Authority
- Kenya Civil Aviation Authority
- List of airports in Kenya
