= Voi Airport =

Airport in Voi, Kenya

- IATA: n/a; ICAO: HKVO

Summary
- Airport type: Public, Civilian
- Owner: Kenya Airports Authority
- Serves: Voi, Kenya
- Location: Voi, Kenya
- Elevation AMSL: 1,900 ft / 580 m
- Coordinates: 03°21′44″S 38°31′54″E

Map
- Location of Voi Airport in Kenya; Placement on map is approximate

Runways
Direction	Length		Surface
Direction	ft	m	Surface
17/35	4,200	1,280	Unpaved

Voi Airport is an airport in Voi, Kenya.

== Location ==
Voi Airport (IATA: n/a, ICAO: HKVO) is located in Taita-Taveta County, in the town of Voi, in southeastern Kenya, close to the International border with the Republic of Tanzania. The airport lies just beyond the western edge of Tsavo East National Park.

Its location is approximately 290 kilometres (180 mi), by air, southeast of Nairobi International Airport, the country's largest civilian airport. The geographic coordinates of this airport are:3° 21' 44.00"S, 38° 31' 54.00"E (Latitude:-3.362221; Longitude:38.531667).

== Overview ==
Voi Airport is a small airport that serves the town of Voi and the adjacent Tsavo East National Park. Situated 580 metres (1,900 ft) above sea level, the airport has a single paved runway that measures 1,400 metres (4,600 ft) in length. flycounty.com (victor)

== Airlines and destinations ==
At the moment there are no regular, scheduled airline services to Voi Airport.

== See also ==
- Kenya Civil Aviation Authority
- List of airports in Kenya
