= Kisii Airport =

- IATA: n/a; ICAO: HKKS

Summary
- Airport type: Public, Civilian
- Owner: Kenya Airports Authority
- Serves: Kisii
- Location: Kisii, Kenya
- Elevation AMSL: 4,898 ft / 1,493 m
- Coordinates: 00°40′21″S 34°41′20″E

Map
- Location of Kisii Airport in Kenya; Placement on map is approximate

Runways
Direction	Length		Surface
Direction	ft	m	Surface
10-28	3,210	980	Asphalt

Kisii Airport is an airport in Kisii County, Kenya.

== Location ==
Kisii Airport (IATA: n/a, ICAO: HKKS) is located in Suneka District, Kisii County, in the town of Suneka which is approx 8 km from Kisii Town a major commercial Hub, in southwestern Kenya, on the eastern shores of Lake Victoria, close to the International borders with Tanzania and Uganda. This is the only airstrip in Kisii and Nyamira counties.

Its location is approximately 251 kilometres (156 mi), by air, northwest of Nairobi International Airport, the country's largest civilian airport. The geographic coordinates of this airport are:0° 40' 21.00"S, 34° 41' 20.00"E (Latitude:-0.672500; Longitude:34.688890).

== Overview ==
Kisii Airport is a small civilian airport, serving the southwestern Kenya'n town of Kisii, and surrounding communities. Situated at 4,898 feet (1,493 m) above sea level, the airport has a single asphalt runway 10-28 which measures 3,210 feet (980 m) in length.

== Airlines and destinations ==
There is no regular, scheduled airline service to Kisii Airport at this time.

== See also ==
- Kenya Airports Authority
- Kenya Civil Aviation Authority
- List of airports in Kenya
