= HKMM =

HKMM may refer to:

- HKMM, the ICAO airport code for Migori Airport, Migori, Kenya
- Hong Kong Maritime Museum, a non-profit educational institution funded by the international shipping community and the government in Hong Kong
