= NDE (disambiguation) =

An NDE usually refers to a near-death experience—of someone who nearly died.

NDE or Ndé may also refer to:

== Businesses and organisations ==
- Netter Digital Entertainment (1995–2000)
- Neustadt-Dürkheimer Eisenbahn-Gesellschaft, a German railway (1862–1870)
- Nevada Desert Experience, a 1980s anti-nuclear campaign

== Places ==
- Ndé, Cameroon, an administrative division
- Mandera Airport, Kenya (IATA:NDE)

== Other uses ==
- Non-destructive examination, to test an object
- Ndé, an endonym used by the Apache people
