= Lake Baringo Airport =

- IATA: LBN; ICAO: none

Summary
- Airport type: Public
- Serves: Baringo County
- Location: Lake Baringo, Baringo County, Kenya
- Coordinates: 0°40′10″N 36°6′12″E

Map
- Location in Kenya

Lake Baringo Airport (IATA: LBN) is an airport located on the western shores of Lake Baringo, Kenya. It received its first commercial flights in January 2016.

== History ==
In January 2016, Fly-SAX began flights to Lake Baringo from Nairobi–Wilson, thereby inaugurating commercial service at the airport. Flights operate twice a week using Cessna 208 Caravan aircraft. The new service has given a boost to the Baringo County tourism industry.

== Airlines and destinations ==
Airlines	Destinations
Fly-SAX	Nairobi–Wilson

== See also ==
- List of airports in Kenya
