= Nairobi airport rail link =

Infrastructure project in Kenya

Nairobi Airport Rail Link

Overview
- Status: Planning
- Locale: Nairobi
- Stations: TBD - includes new station Jomo Kenyatta International Airport and existing Nairobi railway station

Service
- Type: Airport rail link

Technical
- Line length: approximately 17 km (11 mi)
- Track gauge: 1,000 mm (3 ft 3 3/8 in)

The Nairobi airport rail link is an infrastructure project in Nairobi, in Kenya.

The government of Kenya has proposed a rapid rail connection between Jomo Kenyatta International Airport and central Nairobi. As of October 2010, construction was under way, and tenders had been awarded. The project costs 800 million shillings ($US9.13m), and involves 2 km of new rail to connect to the existing railway at Embakasi.

== Stations ==
The line will likely begin at the existing Nairobi railway station along an existing line to and a 2 km extension to Jomo Kenyatta International Airport.

There are number of stations and stops along the current rail route to Embakasi:

- Makadara railway station - existing station
- Donholm rail stop - minor stop
- Stage MPYA rail stop - minor stop
- Pipeline rail stop - minor stop
- Embakasi railway station - existing station

Both Makadara and Embakasi stations will be rebuilt for the airport link and all other stops either removed or rebuilt.

== See also ==
- Railway stations in Kenya
