= Mandera Airport =

- IATA: NDE; ICAO: HKMA

Summary
- Airport type: Public, Civilian
- Owner: Kenya Airports Authority
- Serves: Mandera, Kenya
- Location: Mandera, Kenya
- Elevation AMSL: 758 ft / 231 m
- Coordinates: 03°56′15″N 41°50′55″E

Map
- Location of Mandera Airport in Kenya; Placement on map is approximate

Runways
Direction	Length		Surface
Direction	ft	m	Surface
05/23	3,600	1,100	Asphalt

Mandera Airport is an airport in Mandera, Kenya.

== Location ==
Mandera Airport (IATA: NDE, ICAO: HKMA) is located in Mandera, Mandera County, Kenya, near the tripoint where the International borders of Kenya, Ethiopia and Somalia intersect.

Its location is approximately 800 kilometres (500 mi), by air, northeast of Jomo Kenyatta International Airport, the country's largest civilian airport. The geographic coordinates of this airport are:3° 56' 15.00"N, 41° 50' 55.00"E (Latitude:3.937500; Longitude:41.848610).

== Overview ==
Mandera Airport is a small civilian airport, serving Mandera and surrounding communities. Situated at 758 feet (231 m) above sea level, the airport has a single asphalt runway that measures 3,600 feet (1,100 m) long.

== Airlines and destinations ==
Adesh fly Airlines operated by FLY 540 aviation services Freedom airlines I-Fly airlines, Boston Air Services owned and operated by East African Safari Express ltd.

== See also ==
- Kenya Airports Authority
- Kenya Civil Aviation Authority
- List of airports in Kenya
