= Migori Airport =

Airport in Kenya

- IATA: none; ICAO: HKMM

Summary
- Airport type: Public, Civilian
- Owner: Kenya Airports Authority
- Serves: Migori, Kenya
- Location: Migori, Kenya
- Elevation AMSL: 2,690 ft / 820 m
- Coordinates: 01°06′56″S 034°29′07″E

Map
- Location of Migori Airport in Kenya; Placement on map is approximate

Runways
Direction	Length		Surface
Direction	ft	m	Surface
14/32		1,050	Unpaved

Migori Airport (ICAO: HKMM) is an airstrip in Migori, Kenya.
