= Magadi, Kenya =

Town in Kenya

Coordinates: 1°53′S 36°16′E

Magadi is located southwest of Nairobi, northeast of Lake Natron in Tanzania (click map to enlarge)

Magadi, Kenya is a town in the Kenya Rift Valley at Lake Magadi, located southwest of Nairobi, in southern Kenya. Magadi is northeast of Lake Natron in Tanzania.It takes about 2.5 hours to drive from Nairobi to Magadi.

The general population of Magadi, Kenya is 980 people, with an elevation of 595 meters (1,952 feet).

Magadi township lies on Lake Magadi's east shore, and is home to the Magadi Soda Company, now owned by Tata India. This factory produces soda ash, which has a range of industrial uses. Magadi is the central town of Magadi division in Kajiado County.

Magadi has gained organized access to the Internet, and computer usage, through the United Nations Development Programme-Kenya for solar-powered laptop computers, begun in July 2002: by the end of 2003, about 10,000 residents (48%) had visited the five E-Centers for Internet computer access, developed by the UN project.

Magadi was a filming location for Fernando Meirelles's film The Constant Gardener, which is based on the book of the same name by John le Carré, although in the film, the shots are supposed to be at Lake Turkana, which are actually at Lake Magadi.

== Tourism ==
Tourists visiting Kenya can visit Magadi and the lake by motorbike. Together with a guide, on the back of a boda boda, they can explore the dusty terrain surrounding the lake. Most tourists decide to spend the night in this vast landscape. Even though it is unusual, some wild animals can be spotted here.
