= Garba Tula =

Garba Tula (shortened to Garba)
- Town
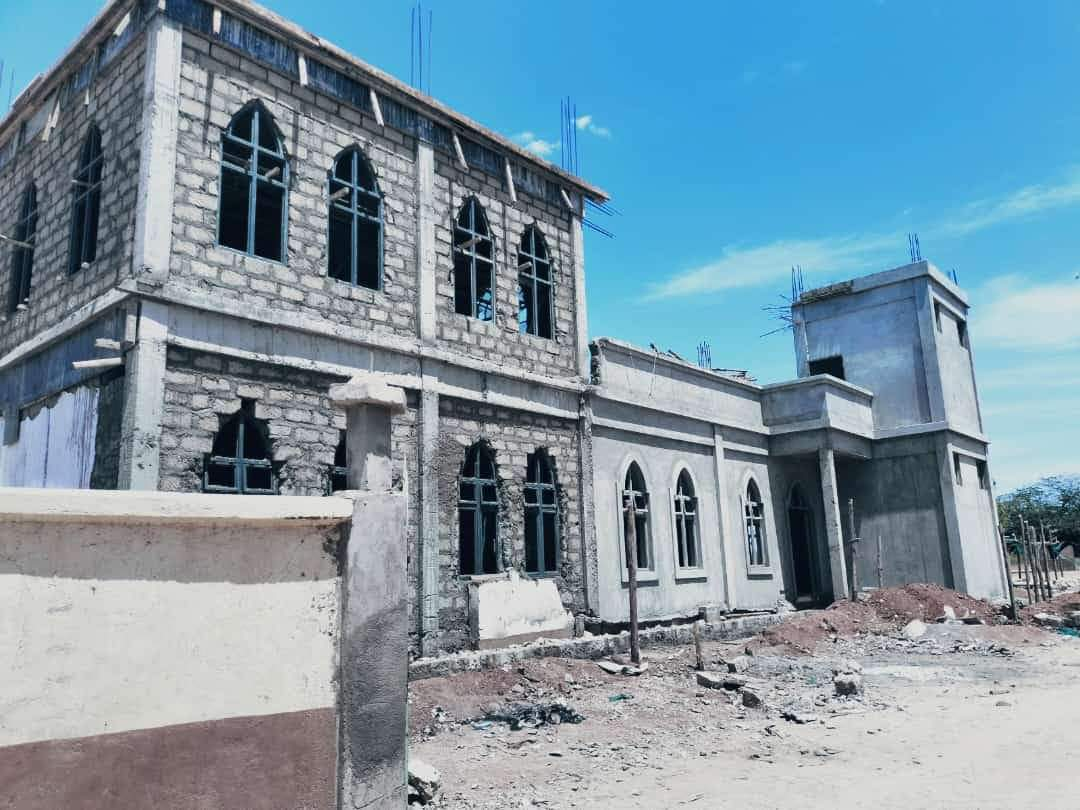
- Jamia Mosque being built in Garba Tula town
- Nickname: El Borte (From Borana Bitter Well)
- Location in Kenya
- Coordinates: 0.52654°N 38.51492°E
- Country: Kenya
- County: Isiolo County
- Time zone: UTC+3 (EAT)
- Postal code: 60301

Garba Tula (also spelled Garbatulla) and popularly nicknamed by the locals El Borte (meaning Bitter Well, probably due to its salty water) is a town in Isiolo County, Northern Kenya. The town has an urban population of about 5,500. In 2007 it was up-graded to a District status. But with the new administrative sub-divisions of Kenya, Garba Tula is a sub-county of Isiolo County, as well as an administrative ward.

As the name suggests, Garbatulla is mainly a Borana inhabited town in Isiolo County, Kenya. In the 1940s Garba Tulla was a very small village and only had three shops on the main road. Mr. Joseph Onyango became the first District Commissioner on 17 November 2007. The town has been known for its famous National School run by NCCK.

Garba Tula is located 120 km East of Isiolo town. The urban center of Mado Gashi is located about 100 km North East of Garba Tula. It is about 90 km to Maua town via Kinna, up to which the road is an all-weather one, and then tarmac which starts right at the gates of Meru National Park which is about 60 km away from Garba Tula town and about 14 km from Kinna town. The locals of the town are the Borana people.
