= Loiyangalani =

- Town
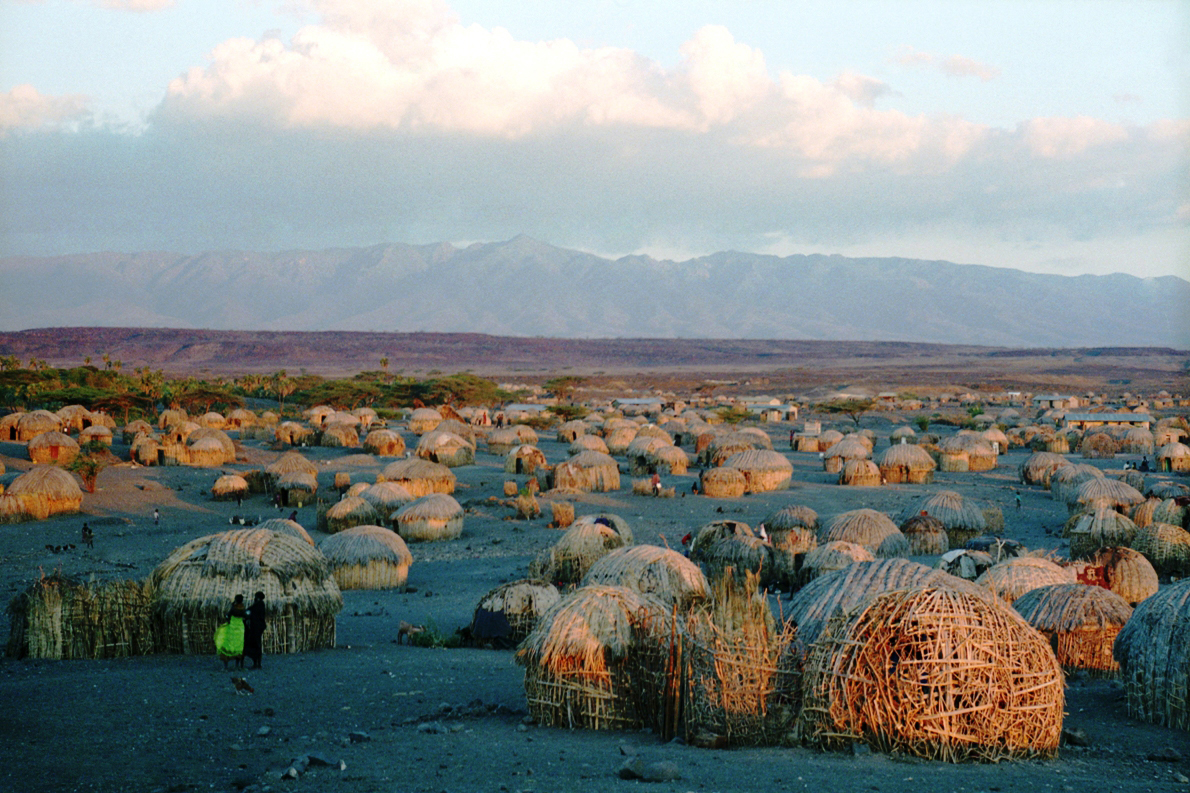

- Location in Kenya
- Coordinates: 2.75774°N 36.71865°E
- Country: Kenya
- County: Marsabit County
- Division: Loiyangalani Division

Population (2009)
  - Total: 5,117
- Time zone: UTC+3 (EAT)

Loiyangalani is a small town located on the southeastern coast of Lake Turkana in Kenya. The town has a population of 5,117. Loiyangalani means "a place of many trees" in the native Samburu tongue. It is home to the Rendille and Elmollo People but now has other Kenyan communities like the Turkana, Luo, Meru, and Somali. The town was founded near a freshwater spring in the 1960s where the Rendille and El Molo people lived. Its main industries include fishing, tourism and gold panning. It is a popular tourist destination in Northern Kenya, as the surrounding El Molo and Turkana villages offer unique (although somewhat commercialized) experiences.

In June 2008, the 1st Cultural Festival took place at Loiyangalani and united all the tribes of the Lake in celebration for one weekend.

The town has an airstrip and lies near Mount Kulal (50 km), known for its forest and stones. There are a few Lodges in the area, the "Oasis Lodge", the "Palmshade Camp", the "Mosaretu Women's Groupe Lodge", and the "Sailo Bandas" all located a few hundred metres from the airstrip.

Loiyangalani Division of Marsabit County is headquartered in Loiyangalani town. The town is sometimes spelled as Loyangalani.

Loiyangalani was the setting for John le Carré's novel The Constant Gardener, and was also a location for the film of the same title. In 2010, Loiyangalani was briefly made a district on its own from the former Laisamis district by the President of Kenya, Mwai Kibaki.
