= Moi International Airport =

International airport in Mombasa

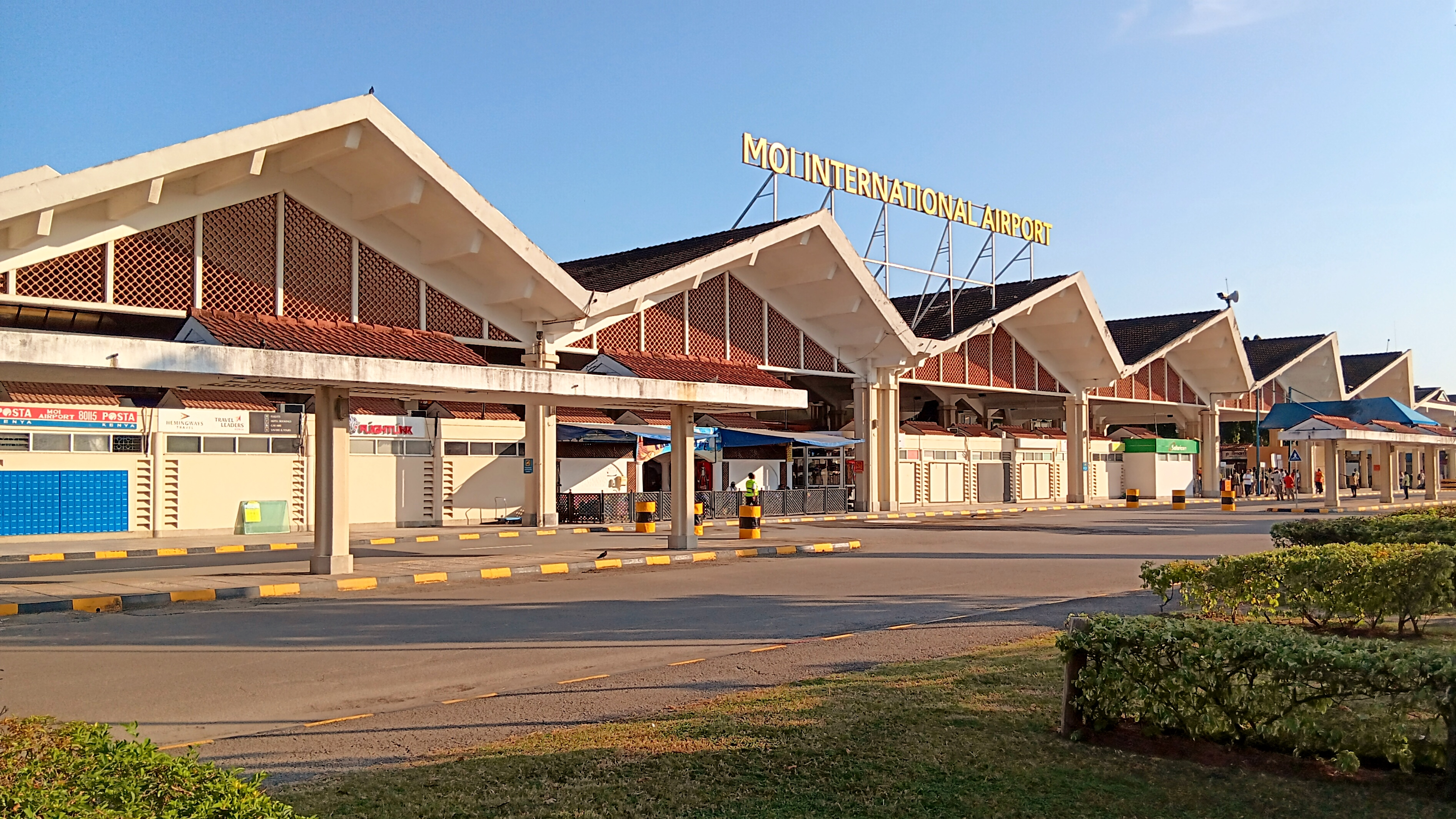
- The terminal building in 2025
- IATA: MBA; ICAO: HKMO

Summary
- Airport type: Public, Civilian
- Operator: Kenya Airports Authority
- Serves: Mombasa
- Location: Mombasa, Kenya
- Hub for: Mombasa Air Safari
- Focus city for: Jambojet; Kenya Airways; Skyward Express
- Elevation AMSL: 200 ft (61 m)
- Coordinates: 04°02′24″S 39°35′24″E

Map
- Location of Moi International Airport in Kenya

Runways
Direction	Length		Surface
Direction	ft	m	Surface
03/21	10,990	3,350	Asphalt
15/33	4,473	1,363	Asphalt

Statistics (2013)
- Passenger numbers: 1,313,168

Moi International Airport (IATA: MBA, ICAO: HKMO) is an international airport in Mombasa, the second-largest city in Kenya. In 2020, the airport was heralded as the "Best Airport in Africa" (with under 2 million passengers annually) by Airports Council International.

== Overview ==
Moi International Airport serves the city of Mombasa and surrounding communities. It lies approximately 425 kilometres (264 mi), by air, southeast of Jomo Kenyatta International Airport, the largest and busiest airport in the country. Mombasa Airport is operated by Kenya Airports Authority. It was named after former Kenyan President Daniel arap Moi during his tenure.

At 61 metres (200 ft) above sea level, the airport has two runways: Runway 1 (3/21) measures 3,350 metres (10,990 ft) in length and is equipped with an ILS instrument landing system. Runway 2 (15/33) measures 1,260 metres (4,130 ft) in length. Both runways are bitumen paved.

== History ==
The airport was built during the Second World War by the Engineer Corps of the South African Army. During the war, it was used by the Fleet Air Arm as a land base of the British Eastern Fleet which was based at nearby Kilindini Harbour from 1942, by the Royal Air Force (AHQ East Africa and No. 246 Wing RAF) which operated anti-submarine Catalina flying boats off the East Africa coast and by the South African Air Force which was engaged in the war against Italy in Abyssinia.

Benair Engineering constructed its first private aircraft maintenance hangar in 1997 as a temporary structure and it is still standing today. The hangar is located adjacent to the government hangar built to maintain Catalina aircraft during WW2 as part of the British East Africa war effort. Benair has been the principal aircraft maintenance facility since its inception at the Kenya coast and the name is based on the Chief engineer Geoffrey Benaglia. Principal customers include Dorenair, Dodsons International, Bluesky Aviation, Precision Air (Tanzania) and Mombasa Air Safari.

Starting on 18 August 1992, Moi International Airport was used as the headquarters for the US Central Command's regional command and control headquarters for Operation Provide Relief until 4 December of that same year when it was subordinated and merged with Operation Restore Hope.

From July to September 1994, Moi International Airport was used almost continuously as a refueling station during the Operation Support Hope humanitarian mission into Rwanda. Empty C-141 and C-5 freighter jets returning to Europe flew to Mombasa due to the scarcity of fuel in the African interior. The airlift through Mombasa ceased by October due to runway expansion work.

== Facilities ==
Moi International Airport has three terminals. Terminal 1 is used for international services, Terminal 2 handles domestic operations, and a separate General Aviation Terminal is used for private and charter flights.

=== Terminal 1: International flights ===
Terminal 1 is the main international terminal. It houses immigration and customs facilities, duty-free shops, departure and arrival gates, and baggage handling systems. Airlines operating scheduled and charter flights between Mombasa and Europe, the Middle East, and regional destinations use this terminal. Some airlines such as Kenya Airways use Terminal 1 for both domestic and international.

=== Terminal 2: Domestic flights ===
Terminal 2 is dedicated to domestic routes. It is used by carriers such as Jambojet and Safarilink for connections between Mombasa and Nairobi as well as other cities in Kenya. Facilities include check-in counters, baggage services, and passenger lounges.

=== General Aviation Terminal (GAT) ===
The General Aviation Terminal serves private aviation, business jets, and charter flights. It provides dedicated handling, quicker clearance, and facilities tailored for non-scheduled operations. It is also used for medical evacuation flights and high-end tourism charters

== Airlines and destinations ==
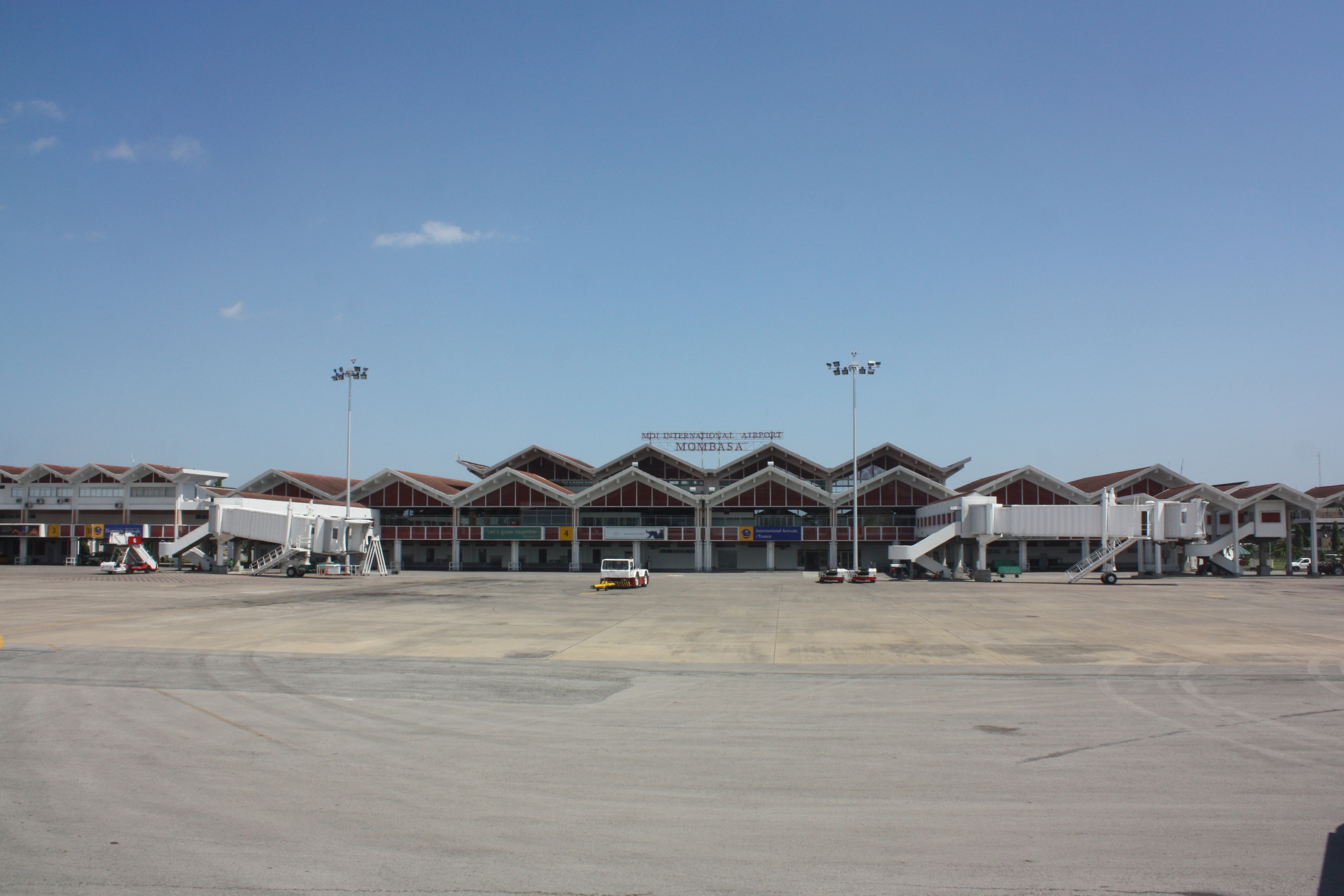
Apron view

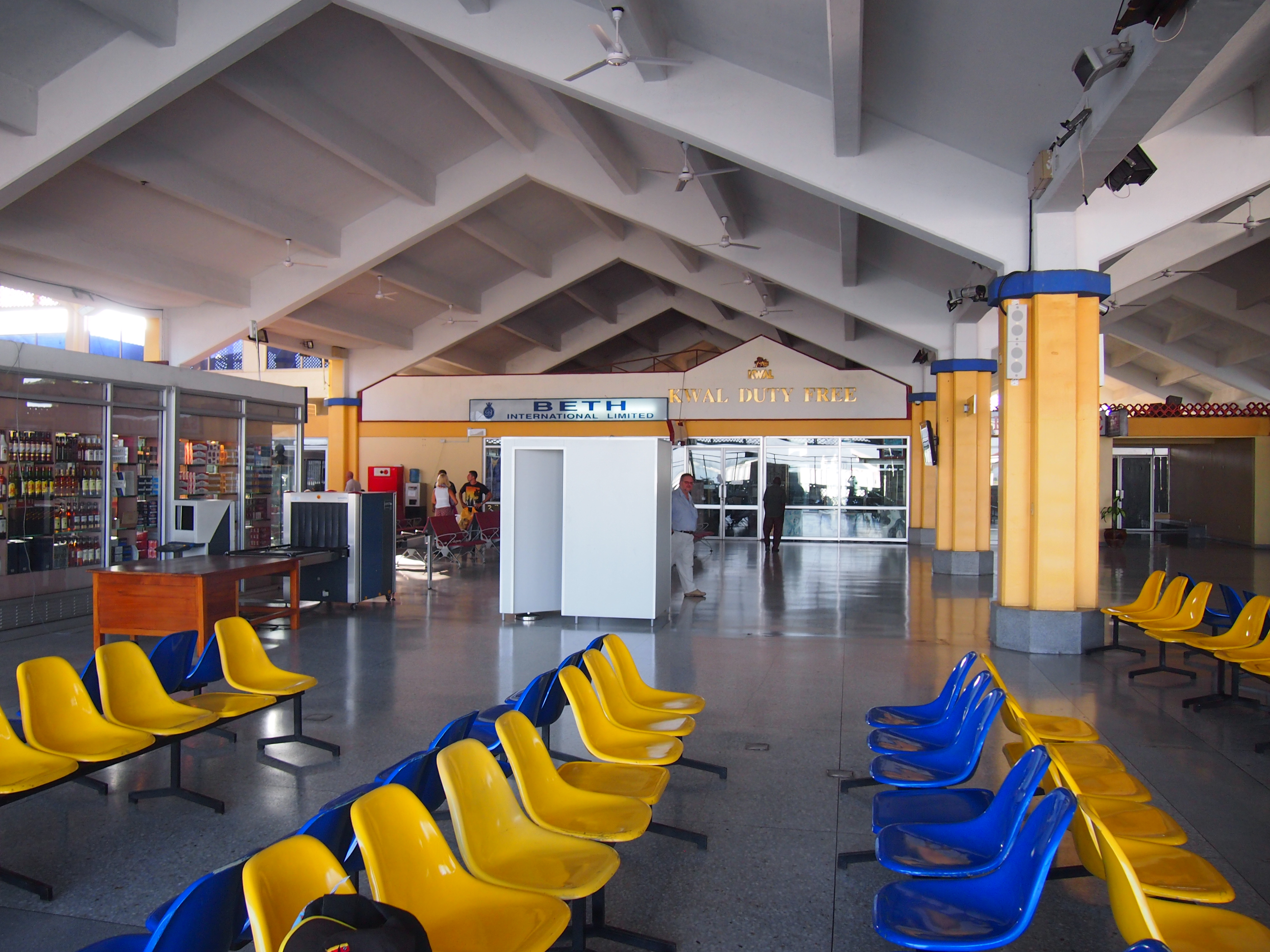
Departure gate area

The following airlines operate regular scheduled and charter flights at Mombasa Moi Airport:

Airlines	Destinations
748 Air	Nairobi–Jomo Kenyatta
Condor	Seasonal: Frankfurt
Air Cairo	Hurghada (begins 25 December 2026)
Discover Airlines	Frankfurt
Enter Air	Seasonal charter: Wrocław
Ethiopian Airlines	Addis Ababa
Flightlink	Dar es Salaam, Zanzibar
flydubai	Dubai–International
Freedom Airline	Nairobi–Jomo Kenyatta
Jambojet	Eldoret, Kisumu, Nairobi–Jomo Kenyatta, Zanzibar
Kenya Airways	Nairobi–Jomo Kenyatta
Mombasa Air Safari	Amboseli, Keekorok, Lamu, Malindi, Masai Mara, Ukunda/Diani Beach
Neos	Milan–Malpensa; Seasonal: Rome–Fiumicino, Verona
Rwandair	Kigali, Zanzibar
Safarilink	Nairobi–Wilson, Zanzibar
Skyward Express	Dar es Salaam, Lamu, Nairobi–Jomo Kenyatta, Nairobi–Wilson
Smartwings	Seasonal charter: Prague
TUI fly Netherlands	Seasonal charter: Amsterdam
Turkish Airlines	Istanbul
Uganda Airlines	Entebbe

== Accidents and incidents ==
In 2002, a group of terrorists fired two Strela missiles at an Israeli aircraft as they took off from Moi International Airport. Neither missile hit the aircraft.
