= Kenya Civil Aviation Authority =

Government regulator

- Logo of the Kenya Civil Aviation Authority

Authority overview
- Formed: October 24, 2002; 23 years ago
- Superseding Authority: Kenya Directorate of Civil Aviation
- Headquarters: Aviation House, Jomo Kenyatta International Airport Embakasi, Nairobi, Kenya
- Minister responsible: Mr Davis Chirchir, Ministry of Transport, Infrastructure, Housing and Urban Development
- Authority executives: Mr. Brown M. M. Ondego, MBS, Chairman; Mr. Emile N. Arao, Director General
- Key document: Kenya Civil Aviation Regulations (KCARS) 2013
- Website: www.kcaa.or.ke

Kenya Civil Aviation Authority (KCAA) is a state corporation of Kenya that is responsible for regulating the aviation industry in Kenya and for providing air navigation services in the Kenya flight region.

The KCAA offers training in the aviation professions through its affiliated East African School of Aviation.

The agency maintains its headquarters in the Aviation Building at the junction entry to Jomo Kenyatta International Airport in Embakasi, Nairobi.

== History ==
Kenya ratified the 1944 Convention on International Civil Aviation (The Chicago Convention) on 1 May 1964, becoming a member of the International Civil Aviation Organization (ICAO) - United Nations’ specialized agency responsible for International Civil Aviation.

The Civil Aviation (Amendment) Act, 2002 established the KCAA in 2002. The functions of the KCAA were previously performed by two departments of the Ministry of Transport: the Civil Aviation Board (CAB) and the Directorate of Civil Aviation (DCA).

The primary functions are geared towards regulation and oversight of Aviation Safety & Security; economic regulation of Air Services and development of Civil Aviation; provision of Air Navigation Services, and training of aviation personnel as guided by the provisions of the convention on international civil aviation, related International Civil Aviation Organisation (ICAO) Standards and Recommended Practices (SARPs), the Kenya Civil Aviation Act, 2013 and the civil aviation regulations.

== See also ==
- Government of Kenya
- Kenya Airports Authority
- Civil aviation authority
- List of civil aviation authorities
