= Kenya Airports Authority =

Kenyan Government department

- Type: Government
- Industry: Transport
- Founded: 1991
- Headquarters: Jomo Kenyatta International Airport; Nairobi, Kenya
- Key people: Henry Ogoye (Ag. Managing Director & CEO)
- Products: Airport operations and services
- Number of employees: 1900
- Website: www.kaa.go.ke

Kenya Airports Authority (KAA) is the owner and operator of nine civilian airports and airstrips in Kenya. Kenya Airports Authority was established by an act of Parliament in 1992, by the ruling Kenya African National Union government. The KAA Act, Cap 395, provides for the powers and functions of the Authority. Its head office is on the property of Jomo Kenyatta International Airport in Embakasi, Nairobi.

== KAA Interests ==
=== Airports ===
- Jomo Kenyatta International Airport – Nairobi
- Moi International Airport – Mombasa
- Eldoret International Airport – Eldoret
- Wilson Airport – Nairobi
- Kisumu International Airport – Kisumu
- Isiolo International Airport
- Malindi Airport – Malindi
- Wajir Airport – Wajir

=== Airstrips ===
- Lokichoggio Airport – Lokichoggio
- Manda Airport – Manda Island
- Ukunda Airport – Diani Beach

== See also ==
- List of airports in Kenya
