= Jomo Kenyatta International Airport =

International airport in Nairobi, Kenya

Jomo Kenyatta International Airport Uwanja wa ndege wa kimataifa wa Jomo Kenyatta
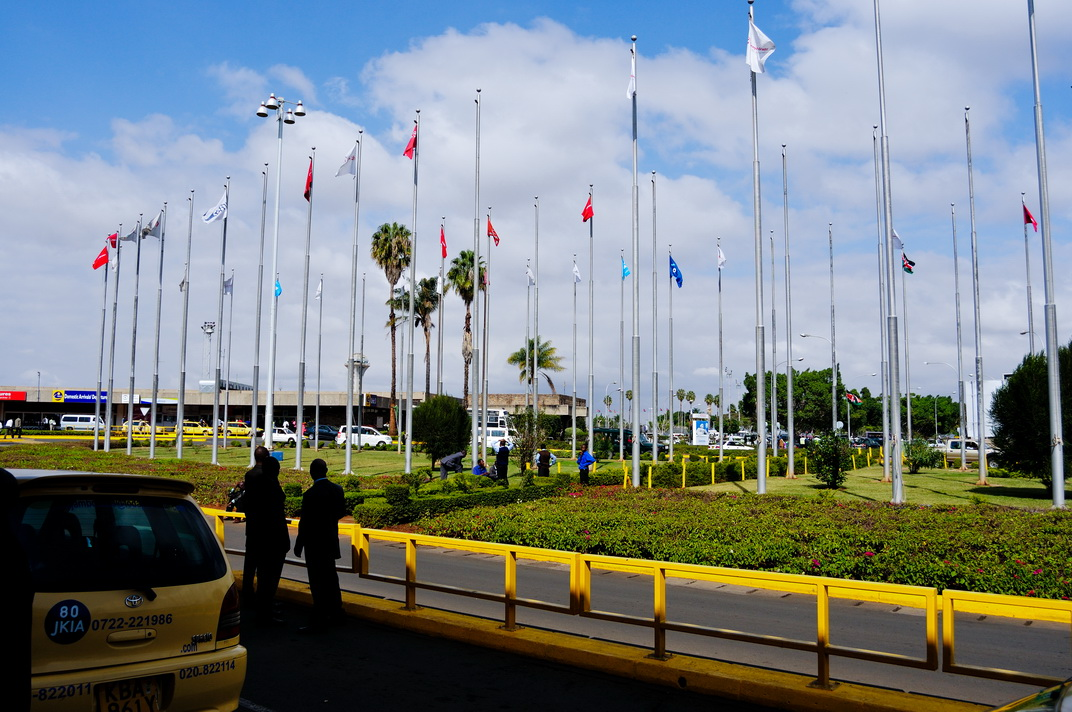
- IATA: NBO; ICAO: HKJK; WMO: 63740

Summary
- Airport type: Public
- Operator: Kenya Airports Authority
- Serves: Nairobi Metropolitan Region
- Location: Embakasi, Nairobi, Kenya
- Opened: 9 March 1958; 68 years ago
- Hub for: Kenya Airways; Jambojet; African Express Airways
- Elevation AMSL: 1,624 m (5,328 ft)
- Coordinates: 01°19′07″S 36°55′33″E
- Website: kaa.go.ke

Map
- Location within Kenya

Runways
Direction	Length		Surface
Direction	m	ft	Surface
06/24	4,117	13,507	Asphalt

Statistics (2024)
- Passengers: 9,067,400
- Freight Traffic: 364,822 tonnes
- Latitude and longitude provided by Kenya Airports Authority

Jomo Kenyatta International Airport (IATA: NBO, ICAO: HKJK) is an international airport serving Nairobi, the capital and largest city of Kenya. It is located in the Embakasi suburb, approximately 18 kilometres (11 mi) southeast of Nairobi city centre. The airport has scheduled flights to destinations in over 50 countries. Originally named Embakasi Airport, the airport's name was changed in 1978 to honour Jomo Kenyatta, who was Kenya's first president and Prime Minister. The airport served over 9 million passengers and over 364,000 tonnes of cargo in 2024, making it the sixth busiest airport in passenger traffic in Africa. It is the busiest out of the four international airports in Kenya, the other three international airports being Kisumu International Airport, Eldoret International Airport and Moi International Airport in Mombasa.

The postal code for Jomo Kenyatta International Airport (JKIA) is 00501.

== History ==
=== 1950s and 1960s ===
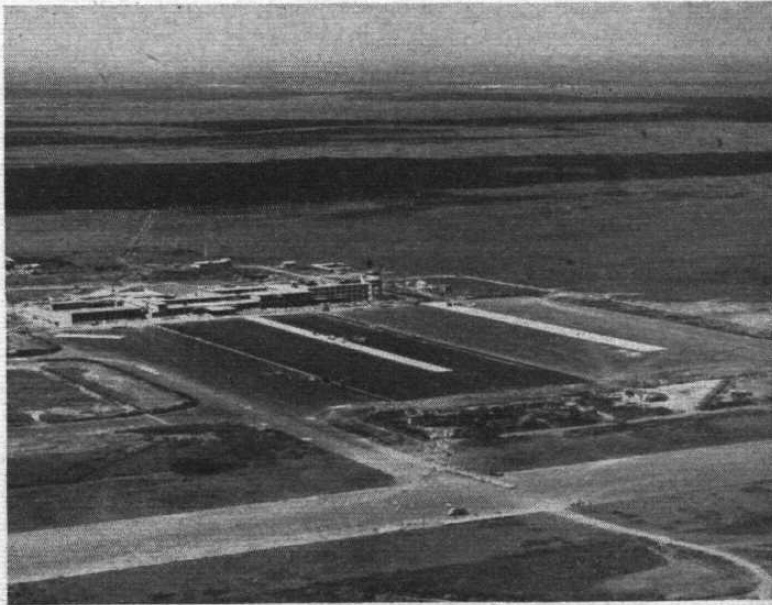
Embakasi Airport in 1958

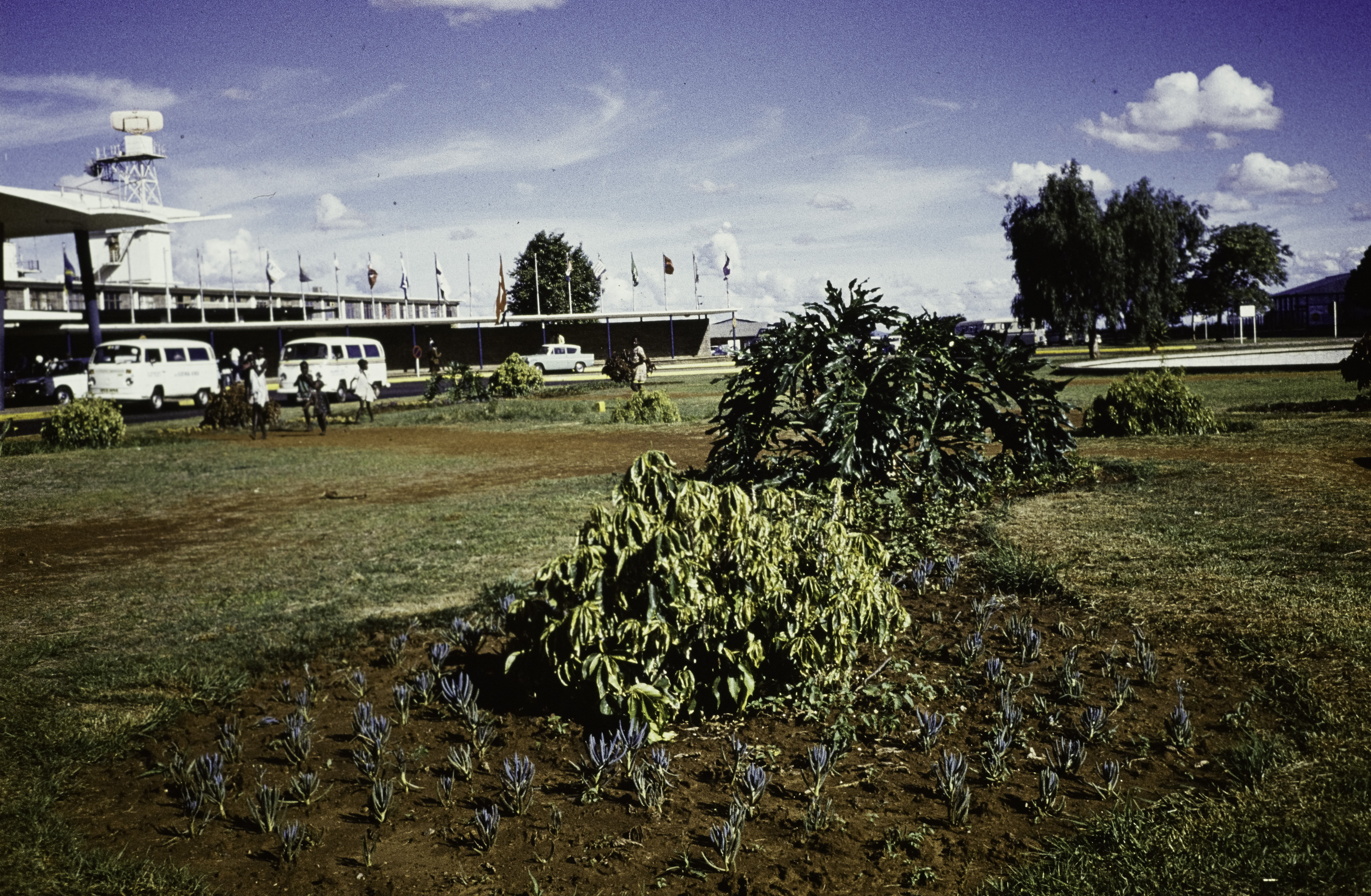
Embakasi Airport in 1975

Discussions about building the airport date back to 1945. At that time, the colonial power—Britain—and its national airline, BOAC, were worried that the existing airport at Eastleigh was inadequate for post-War civilian airliners. The costs of improving Eastleigh versus developing a new airport occupied planners for eight years. Who would pay was a major issue.

The task was by no means straightforward, and many problems, largely of a civil engineering nature, had to be overcome before the runway could be built. An extensive amount of the airport's construction was done utilizing forced labourers, many of whom were suspected Kenya Land and Freedom Army members. Due to the enormous pressure to finish the airport and the high amount of labour necessary, the labourers were worked to the point where some of them died of exhaustion. The working conditions were so poor that there were reports of suicides and self-mutilation among the labourers.

On Sunday 9 March 1958, Embakasi Airport (now JKIA) was opened by the last colonial governor of Kenya, Sir Evelyn Baring.

At the time in 1958, Nairobi was one of the few towns in the world that could boast of a 1965 airport with an expansion option at hand. The number of aircraft movements then was less than 600 per month. The airport architect was strongly influenced by the design of Kloten, Zurich, in the planning and design of Embakasi, although similarities were by no means obvious. Both airports are arranged so that arrival passengers can see completely through the building; the minimum of signs is required. And although Embakasi was designed to meet Nairobi's particular needs, both airports shared a lightness and spaciousness that was at the time extraordinarily refreshing. The fitting and colour schemes employed at the then Embakasi Airport were first-class.

=== 1970s, 1980s and 1990s ===
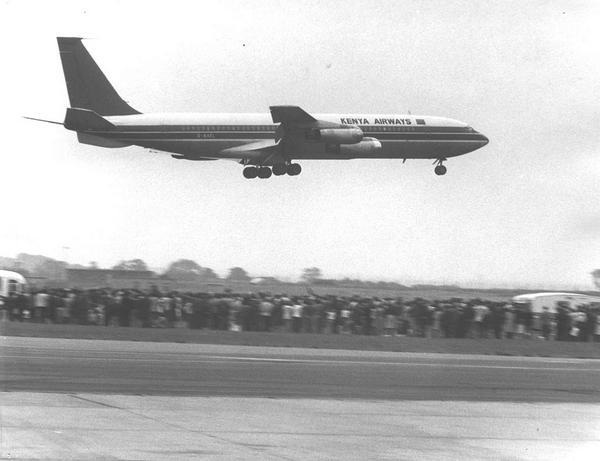
A Kenya Airways Boeing 707 at a Nairobi airshow in 1977

In 1972, the World Bank approved funds for further expansion of the airport, including a new international and domestic passenger terminal building, the airport's first dedicated cargo and freight terminal, new taxiways, associated aprons, internal roads, car parks, police and fire stations, a State Pavilion, airfield and roadway lighting, fire hydrant system, water, electrical, telecommunications and sewage systems, a dual carriageway passenger access road, security, drainage and the building of the main access road to the airport (Airport South Road). The total cost of the project was over US$29 million (US$111.8 million in 2013 dollars). On 14 March 1978, construction of the current terminal building was completed on the other side of the airport's single runway and opened by President Kenyatta.

In October 1994, a British Airways Concorde landed at the airport for purposes of testing the aircraft's performance at high altitude.

=== 2000–present ===
On 10 June 2008, Kenya Vision 2030 was launched by President Mwai Kibaki. Under the vision, JKIA's aging infrastructure was to be upgraded to World Class standards. New terminals and runway upgrades were to be added in phases. The African Development Bank carried out an Environmental Impact Assessment on the development of Phase 1 of the proposed Green Field Terminal (GFT) which was expected to increase the capacity of JKIA to about 18.5 million passengers annually by the year 2030. The Greenfield Terminal project was to encompass the construction of a four level terminal building comprising a central processing area, a transit hotel, landside retail centres, arrivals and departures plaza. Ancillary facilities which would have included an access road, car parking, access taxiways, Ground Service Equipment (GSE) and bus parking areas.

On 29 March 2016, the KES 56 billion (US$560 million) Greenfield Terminal Project was terminated by Kenya Airports Authority because the contractor failed to secure funds, thus ending Kenya's vision of having the largest terminal in Africa.

In February 2017, the airport was awarded a Category One Status by the Federal Aviation Administration of the United States, thus allowing possible direct flights between the US and Nairobi. Five other African countries have direct flights to the US (South Africa, Ethiopia, Egypt, Morocco, and Cabo Verde).

=== 2026 expansion ===
On 23 June 2026, the government signed a contract with China Road and Bridge Corporation for the construction of a KES 154bn new passenger terminal and the refurbishment of existing facilities.

The new terminal has a planned capacity of 10 million passengers annually, with provision for further expansion. The project also includes new taxiways and aircraft parking aprons. The existing terminals will also be expanded to a capacity of 12 million passengers annually, bringing the airport's combined capacity to approximately 22 million.

In September 2026, the Kenya Airports Authority reported that the project was expected to take 54 months.

== 2013 fire ==
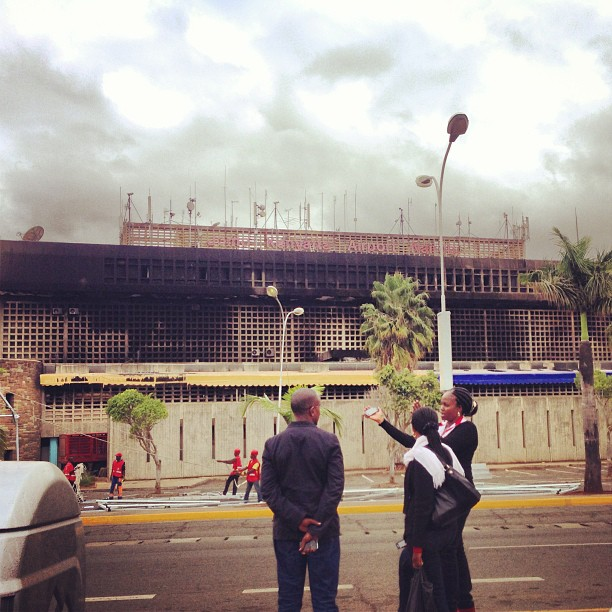
Aftermath of 2013 fire at JKIA

On 7 August 2013, a fire originating in the immigration area caused massive damage to the airport, destroying two of the three units contained in the building. Unit 3, usually dedicated to domestic operations, was used temporarily for international traffic. Incoming flights were diverted to Uganda, Tanzania, and other airports in Kenya. A new unit (Unit IV) was under construction at the time and was scheduled to open in August 2013, but it finally opened on 1 July 2014 and was renamed Terminal 1A. This terminal was not damaged in the fire.

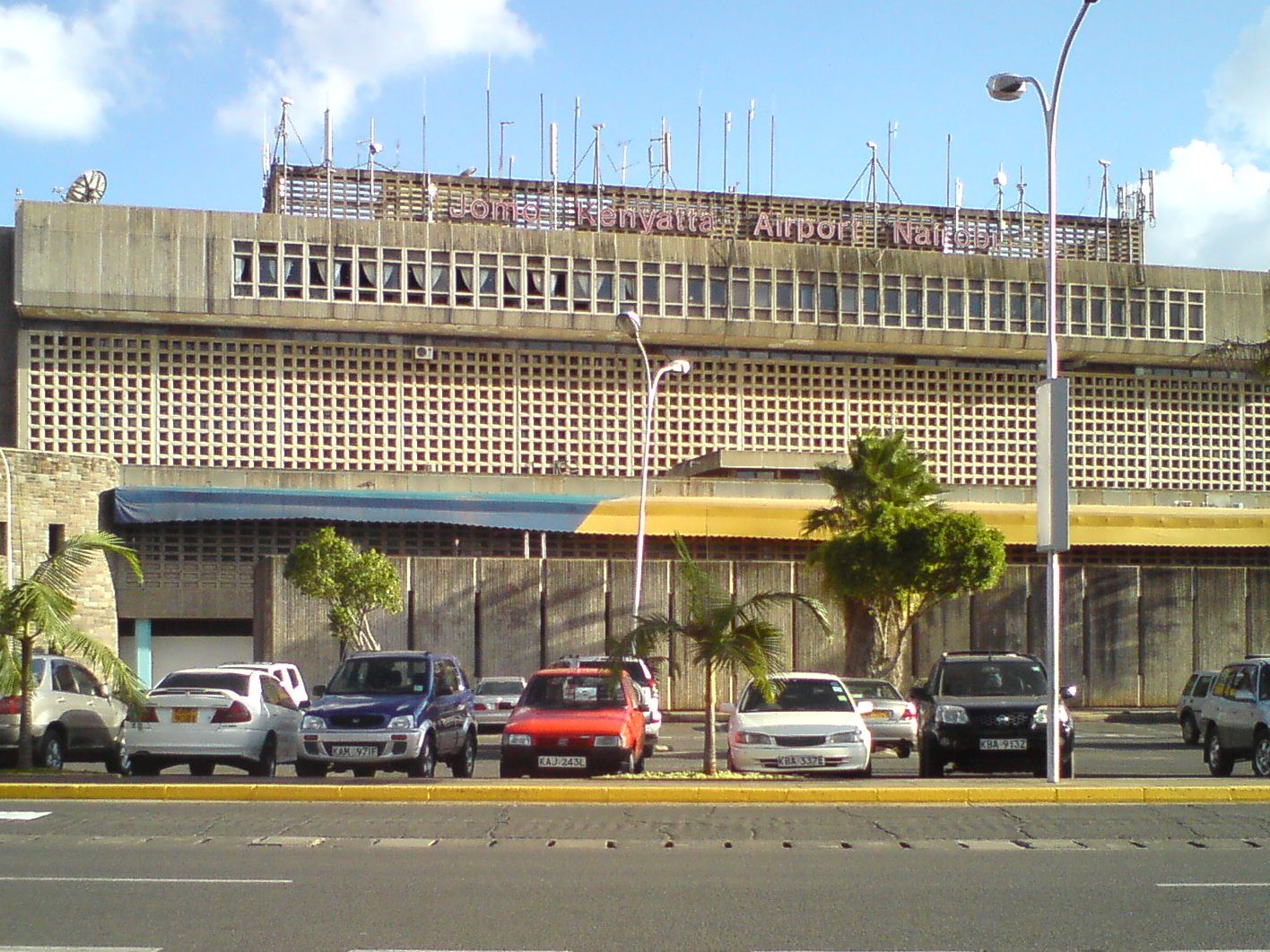
The terminal building of Jomo Kenyatta International Airport as it appeared prior to the 2013 fire.

At approximately 4:30 am local time, a fire originating in the immigration section of Unit I (used for international departures) rapidly spread to adjoining Unit II, which is used for international arrivals. The building's construction (completed in 1978), a roof collapse in Unit I, and heavy traffic in the area hindered initial efforts to extinguish the blaze. Initial media reports showed some firefighters using buckets to fight the fire. Several groups, including the Kenya Army and firefighters from private companies, assisted in fighting the fire. After six hours, on-scene officials indicated that the fire had been contained.

After the fire had been extinguished, businesses affected by the fire reported that items were missing from their businesses. Various reports indicated that first responders had looted fire-damaged businesses during and after the fire, leading some to believe that the fire could have been put out sooner had all the firefighters kept their focus on extinguishing the blaze. Tourists who were displaced by the fire also reported that they were assaulted by thugs who blocked access to the main gate, where the tourists were attempting to retrieve their belongings. There were no immediate reports of injuries to firefighting personnel or other airport employees. A spokesman for Kenya Airways, the primary tenant at the airport, indicated that two of its employees had been transported to a local hospital for observation. One of the individuals was treated for smoke inhalation.

=== Aftermath ===
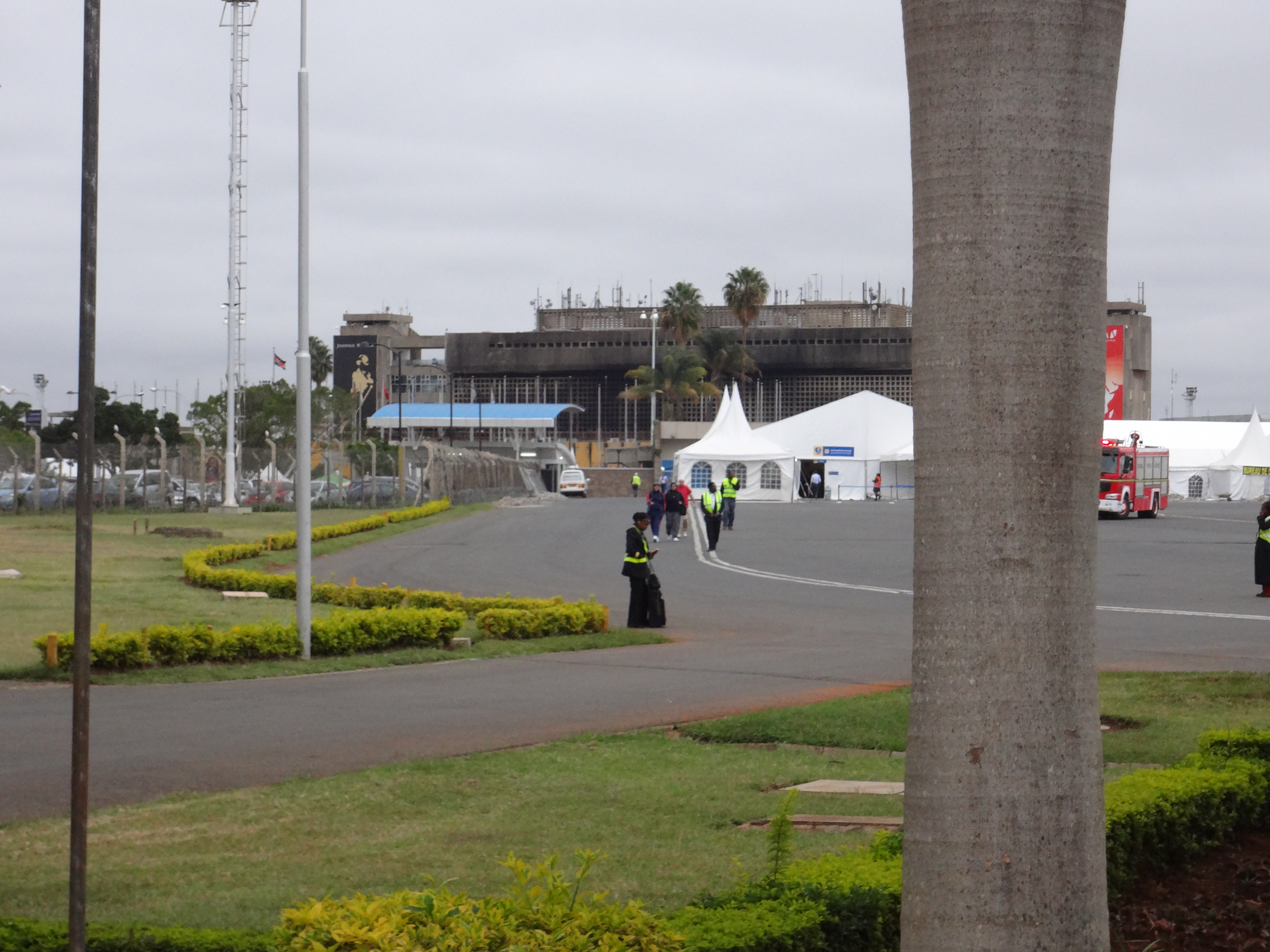
Post-fire damage to the exterior of the terminal building. Following the fire, temporary tents were established on the apron to handle international arrivals. Photo taken approximately 2 weeks after the fire.

After the fire was extinguished, a preliminary investigation was started. Possible terrorism was an initial concern because the fire occurred on the fifteenth anniversary of the terrorist bombings of United States embassies in Kenya and Tanzania plus the fact that Kenya has been involved in an armed conflict with Al-Shabaab in neighbouring Somalia. Investigators, however, soon ruled out terrorism as the cause of the fire, as no explosive devices were discovered during the initial investigation. The cause was later confirmed to be an electrical fault in a distribution board.

The international arrival and departure units were completely destroyed in the fire. Airport officials have elected to use Unit III (used for domestic arrivals and departures) to handle some international traffic. Operations were partly re-established on 8 August.

In June 2015, a new, fully functional temporary terminal building became operational. This terminal building was planned for a design life of 10 years, until completion of the planned new permanent facility.

== Worker's strikes ==
=== 2024 strike ===
On 11 September 2024, airport workers held a strike against proposals to lease the facility to the Adani Group of India for 30 years. The Law Society of Kenya and the Kenya National Commission on Human Rights also criticised the proposal, citing the airport being a "strategic national asset". The two groups also filed petitions in the High Court against the proposal, which led to it being suspended pending a final decision.

=== 2026 strikes ===
On 9 February 2026, airport workers' organisations across the country issued a notice for a planned strike. It was triggered by unfair staff hiring practices, poor compensation and proposed changes to the management of JKIA which were opposed by workers unions. It started on 17 February and ended the next day when the Kenya Aviation Workers Union (KAWU) signed a return to work formula after successful talks with the Kenya Civil Aviation Authority (KCAA) and other stakeholders.

According to KAWU, government did not implement the return to work formula forcing it to resume the previously suspended strike for two days; 30 and 31 August. It resulted in thousands of passengers getting stranded, flight delays at times exceeding 6 hours, flight disruptions including at JKIA. The end of the strike was announced on 1 September after negotiations with various aviation stakeholders. KAWU, the airport and civil aviation authorities, and Jambojet signed another return to work agreement to end the strike while negotiations on outstanding issues continued.

== Facilities ==
The passenger airport consists of two buildings. Terminal 1 is a semi-circular complex divided into five units, 1A to 1E. Terminal 2 stands apart from that complex and is reached by road or shuttle; there is no airside walkway between the two. The original civilian terminal, on the north side of the runway, is used by the Kenya Air Force and is still sometimes called Old Embakasi Airport.

Airline assignments shift. Passengers are advised to check the terminal printed on the ticket.

=== Terminal 1 ===
Terminal 1A opened on 1 July 2014 as the main replacement for the international building damaged in the 2013 fire. Kenya Airports Authority gives it a capacity of 2.5 million passengers a year. It has three levels, 30 check-in desks, 12 departure gates and five baggage carousels, with shops and restaurants airside. Kenya Airways and other SkyTeam carriers use it for most international arrivals and departures.

Units 1B and 1C are separate entrances to Terminal 1 and share the same gates. Both units are used for international departures for airlines that do not operate from 1A.

Terminal 1D, physically part of the same main building as units A-C, serves as the domestic unit.

Terminal 1E was built as a temporary pre-fabricated facility after the 2013 fire pending construction of the then-planned Greenfield Terminal. It has however remained in use as an arrivals point for flights departing from 1B and 1C.

=== Terminal 2 ===
Terminal 2 was built as a temporary prefabricated facility in 2015 to relieve congestion while the planned Greenfield Terminal was developed. Designed to handle 2.5 million passengers annually, it could be dismantled and reassembled at another airport.

The terminal is mainly used by low-cost and regional carriers, both for domestic and international flights.

=== Planned new terminal ===
Construction of a new passenger terminal started in September 2026, with a planned annual capacity of 10 million passengers and provision for further expansion.

=== Airfield ===
The airport has one operational runway, 06/24, 4,117 m (13,507 ft) of asphalt and 60 m (200 ft) wide. It is an ICAO code F pavement and can take aircraft in the class of the Airbus A380 and Boeing 747-8. Edge lighting is installed; there is no full centre-line approach lighting of the sort planned for a second strip. Plans for that second runway are treated under Expansion.

=== Lounges ===
Kenya Airways unveiled the Simba Lounge and Pride Lounge in Terminal 1A in November 2014 and opened them the following year. The two rooms were built at a reported cost of about KES 130–135 million and seat a few hundred people between them. They serve Kenya Airways Premier World and SkyTeam Sky Priority passengers. A further Kenya Airways room, the Msafiri Lounge, is in Terminal 1D for domestic departures.

Paid and alliance lounges in the same complex have included the Swissport Aspire Lounge in Terminal 1B, a Plaza Premium Lounge in Terminal 1D, and a Turkish Airlines lounge used by Star Alliance passengers, most recently described in Terminal 1E. Locations have changed as units have been reassigned, so notices at the airport are the reliable guide.

Terminal 2 has two airside rooms on level 1, the Mara Lounge and the Mount Kenya Lounge. Both are run as 24-hour contract lounges.

=== Other facilities ===
African Express Airways has its head office on the airport grounds. The head office of the Kenya Airports Authority is also at the airport.

== Airlines and destinations ==
=== Passenger ===
Airlines	Destinations
748 Air	Mombasa, Ukunda/Diani Beach
Air Arabia	Sharjah
Air France	Paris–Charles de Gaulle
Air Tanzania	Dar es Salaam, Zanzibar
Airlink	Johannesburg–O.R. Tambo
ASKY Airlines	Lomé
British Airways	London–Heathrow
Brussels Airlines	Brussels
China Southern Airlines	Changsha, Guangzhou
Daallo Airlines	Mogadishu
Egyptair	Cairo
Emirates	Dubai–International
Ethiopian Airlines	Addis Ababa
Etihad Airways	Abu Dhabi
Flightlink	Kilimanjaro, Zanzibar
Flydubai	Dubai–International
Flynas	Riyadh
Freedom Airline Express	Garowe, Mandera, Mombasa
Gulf Air	Bahrain
IndiGo	Mumbai
Jambojet	Eldoret, Entebbe, Kisumu, Lamu, Malindi, Mombasa, Ukunda
Jubba Airways	Mogadishu
Kenya Airways	Abidjan, Accra, Addis Ababa, Amsterdam, Antananarivo, Bangkok–Suvarnabhumi, Bujumbura, Cape Town, Dakar–Diass, Dar es Salaam, Dubai–International, Dzaoudzi, Entebbe, Freetown, Guangzhou, Harare, Johannesburg–O.R. Tambo, Juba, Kigali, Kilimanjaro, Kinshasa–N'djili, Kisumu, Lagos, Lilongwe, Livingstone, London–Gatwick, London–Heathrow, Lubumbashi, Lusaka, Mahé, Malindi, Maputo, Mauritius, Mogadishu, Mombasa, Monrovia–Roberts, Moroni, Mumbai, Nampula, Ndola, New York–JFK, Paris–Charles de Gaulle, Victoria Falls, Zanzibar
KLM	Amsterdam
Lufthansa	Frankfurt
Malawi Airlines	Lilongwe
Precision Air	Dar es Salaam, Kilimanjaro
Qatar Airways	Doha
RwandAir	Kigali
SalamAir	Muscat
Saudia	Jeddah
Skyward Airlines	Eldoret, Lodwar, Malindi, Mombasa
TAAG Angola Airlines	Luanda–Agostinho Neto
Turkish Airlines	Istanbul
Uganda Airlines	Entebbe
Zambia Airways	Dar es Salaam, Lusaka

=== Cargo ===
Airlines	Destinations
Astral Aviation	Aktobe, Dar es Salaam, Delhi, Dubai–Al Maktoum, Entebbe, Harare, Hong Kong, Johannesburg–O.R. Tambo, Juba, Kigali, Liège, Lilongwe, Lusaka, Maputo, Mogadishu, Mumbai, Mwanza, Pemba, Zanzibar; Charter: Aden, Djibouti, Guangzhou, Hargeisa
FedEx Express	Dubai–International
My Freighter Airlines	Tashkent
Ethiopian Airlines	Eldoret

== Statistics ==
Annual passenger statistics
Year	Passengers
2001	2,969,000
2002	3,057,000
2003	3,451,000
2004	3,999,000
2005	4,239,000
2006	4,449,000
2007	4,861,000
2008	4,751,200
2009	5,078,100
2010	5,485,800
2011	6,291,200
2012	6,271,900
2013	5,946,900
2014	6,386,500
2015	6,480,400
2016	7,111,500
2017	7,270,800
2018	8,019,100
2019	8,182,900
2020	2,811,200
2021	3,974,100
2022	6,556,500
2023	8,210,100
2024	9,067,300
2025	8,732,300
Source: Kenya National Bureau of Statistics

== Ground transport ==
The main entrance to Jomo Kenyatta International Airport is on Airport South Road, which can be accessed by an exit from the A109 highway (Mombasa Road). The new 2022 expressway can connect travellers to the airport with no turns or traffic from the city.

Passengers can also travel to and from the airport via city Bus Route Number 34.

On 7 December 2020, a rail link to central Nairobi went into operation.

== Accidents and incidents ==
- On 20 November 1974, Lufthansa Flight 540, a Lufthansa Boeing 747-130, D-ABYB, LH 540, "Hessen" (German state), delivered 1970, crashed on take-off from runway 24 in Nairobi killing 59 of the 157 on board. The aircraft was on a flight from Frankfurt to Nairobi then Johannesburg. This was the first fatal accident and third hull loss of a Boeing 747.
- On 17 May 1989, a Boeing 707-330B operated by Somali Airlines aborted take-off and then overran the wet runway and crashed into a rice field. The plane had 70 passengers and crew on board, but no fatalities resulted. The airplane was damaged beyond repair.
- On 4 December 1990, a Boeing 707-321C freighter operated by Sudania Air Cargo struck an electricity pole 5 kilometres (3.1 mi) short of runway 06 and crashed in flames. Visibility was 500 metres (1,600 ft) in fog with a 30 metres (98 ft) cloud base. All 10 occupants on board died. The airplane was damaged beyond repair.
- On 2 July 2014, a Fokker 50 crashed after takeoff due to a mechanical failure, killing all four people on board.
- On 4 January 2015, a Fokker 50 carrying six people crashed after a landing gear failure. Of the six on board, no injuries were reported. Jomo Kenyatta Airport was temporarily closed and all flights were diverted to Moi International Airport, Mombasa.
