= List of airlines of Kenya =

This is a list of airlines currently operating in Kenya:

Airline	Image	IATA	ICAO	Callsign	Hub airport(s)	Notes
748 Air Services		H4	IHO	SEFEAS	Nairobi-Kenyatta Airport	
Aberdair Aviation			BDV	ABERDAV	Nairobi-Wilson Airport	
Aero-Pioneer Group					Nairobi-Wilson Airport	
Acariza Aviation					Nairobi-Wilson Airport	
AD Aviation Aircharters					Nairobi-Wilson Airport	
Aeronav Air Services					Nairobi-Wilson Airport	
AeroSpace Consortium			AKQ	MOONFLIGHT	Nairobi-Kenyatta Airport	
African Express Airways		XU	AXK	EXPRESS JET	Nairobi-Kenyatta Airport	
Air Direct-Connect		DQ	DCP		Nairobi-Kenyatta Airport	
Airkenya Express		P2	XAK	SUNEXPRESS	Nairobi-Wilson Airport	
Airlink Kenya					Nairobi-Wilson Airport	
AirTraffic Africa			ATY	AIRCARE	Nairobi-Wilson Airport	
Airworks Kenya Limited			AKS	AKEL	Nairobi-Wilson Airport	Scheduled and non scheduled Operations
ALS - Aircraft Leasing Services		K4	ALW		Nairobi-Wilson Airport	
Astral Aviation		8V	ACP	ASTRAL CARGO	Nairobi-Kenyatta Airport	
Aushaan Air			HAN	KING BEE	Nairobi-Wilson Airport	
Avro Express					Nairobi-Wilson Airport	
Blue Bird Aviation			BBZ	COBRA	Nairobi-Wilson Airport	
Blue Sky Aviation Services			SBK	MAWINGU	Mombasa-Moi Intl. Airport	
Buffair Services			BUF	SPEEDHAWK	Nairobi-Wilson Airport	
Capital Airlines			CPD	CAPITAL DELTA	Nairobi-Wilson Airport	
DAC Aviation		JX			Nairobi-Wilson Airport	
Fanjet Express			FJE	FANJET	Nairobi-Wilson Airport	
Fly540		5H	FFV	SWIFT TANGO	Nairobi-Kenyatta Airport	
Eastafrican.com		B5	EXZ	TWIGA	Nairobi-Kenyatta Airport	
Everett Aviation			EVK	EVERETT	Mombasa-Moi Intl. Airport	
Freedom Airline Express		4F	FDT	FREEDOM EAGLE	Nairobi-Wilson Airport	
Global Airlift			GAW	SKYCRAWLER	Nairobi-Wilson Airport	
Great Airways					Nairobi-Kenyatta Airport	
IBM Airlines					Jomo Kenyatta International Airport	
Jambojet		JM	JMA	CHUI	Nairobi-Kenyatta Airport	
Jetways Airlines		WU	JWX	JETWAYS	Nairobi-Wilson Airport	
Jubba Airways (Kenya)		3J	JBW	AIRJUB	Nairobi-Kenyatta Airport	
KASAS					Nairobi-Wilson Airport	
Kenya Airways		KQ	KQA	KENYA	Nairobi-Kenyatta Airport	
Knight Aviation					Nairobi-Wilson Airport	
LadyLori					Nairobi-Wilson Airport	
Mombasa Air Safari			RRV	SKYROVER	Mombasa-Moi Intl. Airport	
Pan African Airways		5F	ODM	JETAFRICA	Nairobi-Kenyatta Airport	
Penial Air			PEL	AIRPEN	n/a	
Phoenix Aviation			PHN	JADESTAR	Nairobi-Wilson Airport	
Queensway Air Services					Nairobi-Wilson Airport	
Reliance Air Charters					Nairobi-Wilson Airport	
Renegade Air			RNG	RENEGADE	Wajir Airport	
Ribway Cargo Airlines					Nairobi-Kenyatta Airport	
Safari Express Cargo		ZF	SXY	SAFARI EXPRESS	Nairobi-Kenyatta Airport	
Safarilink Aviation		F2	XLK	SAFARILINK	Nairobi-Wilson Airport	
Safe Air		K3	SAQ	SINBAD	Nairobi-Wilson Airport	
Silverstone Air Services		K5	SLR	SILVERSTONE	2013	
Skytrail Air Safaris					Bamburi Airport	
Skyward Airlines		OW	SEW	SKYWARD AIRLINES	Nairobi-Wilson Airport	
Solenta Aviation Kenya					Nairobi-Kenyatta Airport	
Tamarind Air					Nairobi-Kenyatta Airport	
Timbis Air		2T	TBS	TIMBIS	Nairobi-Kenyatta Airport	
Transafrican Air		TA	TAK	TRANSAFRICAN	Nairobi-Kenyatta Airport	
Transworld Safaris					Nairobi-Wilson Airport	
Trident Aviation					Nairobi-Wilson Airport	
Tubania Aviation Group					Nairobi-Wilson Airport	
Yellow Wings Air Service			ELW	YELLOW WINGS	Nairobi-Wilson Airport	
Z. Boskovic Air Charters Ltd.			ZBA	BOSKY	Nairobi-Wilson Airport	Founded 1964

== See also ==
- List of defunct airlines of Kenya
- List of airports in Kenya
- List of airlines
