= Eastafrican.com =

Kenyan airline

Eastafrican
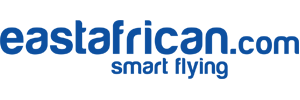
IATA	ICAO	Call sign
B5	EXZ	TWIGA
- Founded: 2012
- Hubs: Jomo Kenyatta International Airport, Wilson Airport
- Focus cities: Local and regional
- Fleet size: 5
- Destinations: 17
- Parent company: Fly540
- Headquarters: Wilson Airport, Nairobi, Kenya
- Key people: Don Smith (CEO and Founder) Charles Wako (Chairman)
- Website: eastafrican.com

East African Safari Air Express Ltd trading as Eastafrican.com is a Kenyan airline based at Wilson Airport in Nairobi. Originally East African Safari Air, the airline was rebranded as Fly-SAX after its purchase by the parent company of Kenyan airline Fly540, then later to Eastafrican.com

== History ==
Before its current iteration, the airline began operations as East African Safari Air Limited, founded by Anthony A. Kegode and incorporated in May 1989. The company later changed its name to East African Safari Air Express.

In September 2004, East African Safari Air Express was placed into receivership. At that time, the airline was transporting an estimated 25,000 passengers per month on various routes. East African Safari Air Express emerged from receivership and operated scheduled regional and domestic services with a fleet of McDonnell-Douglas DC-9s and a Fokker F28 that once belonged to competing Kenyan airline JetLink Express.

In November 2010, the airline was grounded in a dispute over payment of airline leases. In December 2010, low-cost carrier Fly540 purchased the assets of East African Safari Air Express, and the operation was re-branded as Fly-SAX (an ode to its former Safari Air Express moniker) in September 2012. The airline carried over the same IATA (B5) and ICAO (EXZ) airline codes to the new brand.

In April 2013, Fly540 signed an acquisition agreement with Tanzanian airline Fastjet that would see Fastjet assume Fly540's operations in order to establish Fastjet service in Kenya. This purchase leaves it unclear whether or not Fly-SAX will continue as a separate entity, as Fastjet staff have indicated that the Fly540 brand will eventually be phased out.

== Destinations ==
As of January 2016, Eastafrican.com flies to the following destinations:

Country	City/County	Airport
Comoros	Moroni	Prince Said Ibrahim International Airport
Kenya	Baringo County	Lake Baringo Airport
Kenya	Garissa	Garissa Airport
Kenya	Isiolo	Isiolo Airport
Kenya	Kitale	Kitale Airport
Kenya	Kwale County	Ukunda Airport
Kenya	Lamu	Manda Airport
Kenya	Lodwar	Lodwar Airport
Kenya	Malindi	Malindi Airport
Kenya	Mombasa	Moi International Airport
Kenya	Nairobi	Jomo Kenyatta International Airport ^{[Hub]}
Kenya	Nairobi	Wilson Airport ^{[Hub]}
Kenya	Nanyuki	Nanyuki Airport
Kenya	Narok County	Mara Serena Airport
Kenya	Wajir	Wajir Airport
Somalia	Mogadishu	Aden Adde International Airport
Uganda	Entebbe	Entebbe International Airport

== Fleet ==
=== Current fleet ===
The Eastafrican.com fleet consists of the following aircraft (as of August 2017):

Eastafrican.com Fleet
Aircraft	In Fleet	Orders	Passengers		
Aircraft	In Fleet	Orders	C	Y	Total
Bombardier CRJ200ER	1	—	—	50	50
Douglas DC-9-10	1	—	—	80	80
Douglas DC-9-10	1	---	20	---	20
Fokker F28 Fellowship 4000	1	—	—	67	(Stored due to lack of Flight Crew)
Beechcraft B1900	1	----	--	19	19
Cessna 208 Caravan	2	---	--	9	9
Total	7	—			

== Accidents ==
On 5 June 2018, a Cessna 208 Caravan operating as Fly-SAX Flight 102 from Kitale Airport to Wilson Airport in Nairobi disappeared en route, losing contact with air traffic control while over the Aberdare Range in central Kenya. The plane had two crew and ten passengers on board.

The wreck of the Cessna C208 aircraft, registration number 5Y-CAC, was found at around 6.45 am ( GMT+3 ) by the aerial search team at Elephant Point, some 11,000 feet above sea level.

A few hours after the discovery of the wreckage, Fly-SAX confirmed through a press release on their website that there were no survivors. The total number of fatalities was 10.
