= List of defunct airlines of Kenya =

This is a list of defunct airlines of Kenya.

Airline	Image	IATA	ICAO	Callsign	Commenced operations	Ceased operations	Notes
Aero Air Service					2009	2009	Operated Beech Baron, Cessna 172, Cessna 206, Cessna 208, DHC-6 Twin Otters
Aero Kenya					1997	2010	Operated Beech 1900
African Air Cars					1946	1949	Founded by Ralph Blair Whitehead. Operated Avro Anson, Percival Proctor
African Airlines International		SY	AIK	AFRICAN AIRLINES	1987	2003	Operated Antonov An-32, Boeing 707-321C
African Cargo Airways			EAI		1990	1996	Operated Lockheed L-100 Hercules
African Cargo Services Ltd			ACB	AFRICARGO	1975	1978	Operated Bristol Britannia
African Commuter Services					1996	2003	Operated Gulfstream I, HS 748
African Safari Airways		A2	QSC	ZEBRA	1967	2008	
Afrika Aviation			FRK	AFRIFAST	2000	2005	
Air Al-Faraj					1997	1998	Operated Beech 1900
Air East Africa					1993	1996	Operated Boeing 727
Air Flamingo					1964	1965	Operated Cessna 150, Cessna 180, Cessna 206
Air Kenya		QP			1970	1987	Merged with Sunbird to form Airkenya Aviation. Operated Douglas C-47, DHC-6 Twin Otters, Cessna Caravan
Airkenya Aviation		QP	SAL		1987	2007	Renamed to Airkenya Express. Operated Douglas C-47, DHC-6 Twin Otters
Airstream Kenya					2011	2015	Operated HS 748
Amphibians					1978	1978	Operated Britten-Norman Trislander
Autair Helicopters					1964	1970	Subsidiary of Autair
Avonair					1964	1968	Operated Cessna 206
Branton Air Service					1993	1997	Operated Douglas DC-3
Britex Air Services					2017	2017	Operated Embraer Brasilia
British East Africa Airways					1964	1965	Operated Lockheed L-049 Constellation
Campling Bros. & Vanderwal					1946	1964	Operated Beech Baron, Cessna 182, Cessna 210, Macchi MB.320, de Havilland Moth Minor
Caspair		QP	SAL	SUNBIRD	1946	1979	Renamed to Sunbird Aviation. Operated Douglas C-47, de Havilland Dragon Rapide, DHC-6 Twin Otters, BN-2 Islander
CMC Aviation					1961	2011	Rebranded as DAC East Africa
CHS Aviation					1990	1998	Rebranded East African Safari Air
Clairways					1947	1953	Operated Avro Anson
Coast Air			CQA	COASTAIR	?	?	
Cooper Skybird Aircharters			SKY		1980s	1980s	Operated Britten-Norman Trislander
DAS Air Cargo			DAZ	DASAIR	1983	2007	Operated Boeing 707, Douglas DC-10
Eagle Aviation		Y4	EQA	MAGNUM	1986	2003	Merged into East African Express. Operated ATR 42, Boeing 737, DHC-6 Twin Otters, Fokker F28, Let Turbolet
East African Air Charters					2004	2008	
East African Airways		EC	EC	EASTAF	1945	1977	
East African Safari Air Express		B5	EXZ	DUMA	2002	2012	Rebranded as Fly SAX
East Coast Airlines			ECK	EAST COAST	1980s	1980s	Operated Boeing 757
Equator Airlines		3P	PKA	EQUATOR	1990	1999	Renamed to African Express Airways
Falcon Air Charters					1990	1999	To ALS – Aircraft Leasing Services. Operated Beech 1900
Fast Airways			TFS	FAST TRANSPORT	1997	2000	
Flamingo Airlines		F7	KFL	NAKURU	2000	2009	Launched by Kenya Airways and branded Kenya Flamingo Airlines. Absorbed by Kenya Airways. Operated Saab 340
Fly County Airlines					2015	2017	
Fly SAX		B5	EXZ	DUMA	2012	2019	Renamed to EastAfrican
Freight Air Service Transport			TFS	FAST TRANSPORT	1997	2000	Operated Boeing 747
Global Star Airlines					1997	1999	Operated Boeing 727, Douglas DC-3
Gulf Falcon Air Services			AKF	AFRICAN FALCON	2000	2000	Operated Boeing 747
Ibis Aviation					1997	1998	Operated Beech Super King Air, Cessna Titan
JetLink Express		J0	JLX	KEN JET	2006	2012	
Kaskazi Aviation					2001	2006	
Kencargo Airlines International				KEN JET	2001	2004	
Kenya Air Charters		KB		KENCHARTER	1978	1979	
Kenya Aircraft Company					1925	1929	
Kenya Flamingo Airways		F7	KFL		1978	2000	Rebranded as Flamingo Airlines. Operated Saab 340
Lennox Airlines			LAK		1986	2000	Operated Boeing 707-320
Malindi Air Services					1977	1999	Operated Let Turbolet
Noon and Pearce Air Charters					1946	1955	
North Sea Aerial & General Transport Company					1926	1927	Airmail services
Pharazyn Air Charters					1955	1963	Operated Beech Bonanza, Piper Pacer
Pioneer Airlines					1979	1987	Renamed to African Express Airways
Prestige Air Services					1985	2009	
Rapid Air					1970	1974	Renamed to Mombasa Air Safari
Regional Air		QT	RAW	BLUERAY	2000	2005	
Relief Air Transport					1993	1996	Flew humanitarian aid for the UN. Operated Curtiss C-46
Ribway Cargo Airlines					2014	2016	Operated Douglas DC-8-70
Ross Air					2001	2006	
Silverstone Air		K5	SLR	SILVERSTONE	2017	2019	
Simba Air Cargo			SRE	SIMBAIR	1995	2001	Operated Boeing 707, HS 748
Simbair					1971	1977	Subsidiary of East African Airways
Sincereways Kenya					1996	1998	Operated Douglas DC-6B
Sky Bird Air Safaris					2002	2004	Subsidiary of ALS merged in
Sky Relief Services					2000s	2010s	Operated Fokker F27, DHC-5 Buffalo
Skyward International Aviation		OE	SEW		2010	2014	To Skyward Express
Skyways					1948	1951	
Skyways Airlines					1996	2005	
Skyways Kenya					1996	2001	Operated Gulfstream I
SouthEast Airlines					2014	2015	Operated Douglas DC-9-30
Stridestar International Airlines					1985	1986	
Sunbird Aviation						1987	Merged with Air Kenya to form Airkenya Express
Sunbird Charters					1968	1979	
Superior Aviation					2004	2008	
Ticair Charters					1968	1975	
Trackmark Cargo					1989	2009	Operated HS 748
Tristar Air					2018	2019	Operated Fokker 50, Beech King Air, Cessna Caravan
Ukunda Airways					1988	1990	Operated Dornier 228
Western Airways					1998	2004	Established as Western Kenya Air Charters
Wilkenair					1960	1970	Established ad Caspair
Wilson Air					1933	1936	
Wilson Airways					1929	1939	Founded by Florence Kerr Wilson, Thomas Campbell-Black and Archibald W. Watkins. Operated DH.60G Gipsy Moth, Avro 619 Five

== See also ==
- List of airlines of Kenya
- List of airports in Kenya
