= Silverstone Air =

Kenyan airline

Coordinates: 01°19′23″S 36°48′30″E

IATA	ICAO	Call sign
K5	SLR	SILVERSTONE
- Founded: 2017
- Ceased operations: 2020
- Operating bases: Wilson Airport
- Focus cities: Nairobi, Mombasa, Kisumu
- Fleet size: 11
- Destinations: 8
- Headquarters: Wilson Airport
- Key people: Mohamed Somow; Managing Director; Owen Muigai; Owner
- Website: Homepage

Silverstone Air Services Limited, trading as Silverstone Air, was a privately owned airline in Kenya, licensed by the Kenya Civil Aviation Authority with an air operator's certificate.

== Location ==
The headquarters of Silverstone Air were located on the ground floor of Aerlink House, at Wilson Airport, in the south-western part of Nairobi, the capital and largest city of Kenya. The geographical coordinates of the airline's headquarters are:1°19'23.0"S, 36°48'30.0"E (Latitude:-1.323056; Longitude:36.808333).

== History ==
Silverstone Air was owned and operated by Kenyans. The airline was founded in 2017. It operated scheduled, charter and cargo flights inside Kenya. Scheduled flights were available to Kisumu, Mombasa, Lamu, Eldoret, Malindi, Lodwar, Ukunda.

On 12 March 2020 the airline suspended all flights due to non-compliance problems.

== Destinations ==
From its hub in Nairobi Wilson Airport, the company operated scheduled services to destinations within Kenya. The airline also operated direct return flights to Mombasa from Kisumu International Airport.

Country	City	Airport	Notes	Refs
Kenya	Eldoret	Eldoret International Airport	—	
Kenya	Kisumu	Kisumu International Airport	Hub	
Kenya	Lamu	Lamu Airport	—	
Kenya	Lodwar	Lodwar Airport	—	
Kenya	Malindi	Malindi Airport	—	
Kenya	Mombasa	Mombasa International Airport	—	
Kenya	Nairobi	Wilson Airport	Hub	
Kenya	Ukunda	Ukunda Airport	—	

== Fleet ==
As of September 2019, Silverstone Air operated the following aircraft:

Silverstone Air
Aircraft	In fleet	Order	Passengers	Notes
Bombardier CRJ 100ER(F)	1	0		
Bombardier Dash 8-100	2	0	37	
Bombardier Dash 8-300	3	0	50	
Fokker 50	3	0	50	
Fokker 50F	2	0		
Total	11	0		

== Incidents and accidents ==
In September 2020, a Silverstone Air Fokker 50 cargo plane crashed in Mogadishu, Somalia during landing. No fatalities were recorded. On 12 October 2019, a Silverstone Air Fokker 50 aircraft bound for Mombasa Airport, with continuing service to Lamu Airport, veered off the runway at Wilson Airport in Nairobi. While attempting to take off, with a total of 55 people on board, 50 passengers and five crew members, the aircraft veered off the runway and crashed through the fence, coming to rest in the brush. Nine people on board were injured and the aircraft was damaged.

On 28 October 2019, a Dash 8-300, registration 5Y-BWG, operated by Silverstone Air, lost its rear-right wheel assembly on take-off from Lodwar Airport, with four passengers and five crew members on board. Originally destined for Wilson Airport in Nairobi, the flight was diverted to Eldoret International Airport, where it made a safe emergency landing. The detached wheel assembly was recovered by the public outside Lodwar Airport, in Turkana County.

As a result of a safety audit by the Kenya Civil Aviation Authority following these two accidents, the airline was ordered on 12 November 2019 by the Kenyan Civil Aviation Authority to suspend operations with the Dash 8 for seven days.

On 19 September, a Fokker 50 (5Y-MHT) after take-off at Mogadishu, the aircraft returned to the Aden Adde International Airport in Mogadishu for an emergency landing. During that landing, the aircraft veered off the runway and impacted a perimeter wall.

== See also ==
- Airlines of Africa
- List of airlines of Kenya
