= Fly540 =

Kenyan airline

| IATA | ICAO | Call sign |
|---|---|---|
| 5H | FFV | SWIFT TANGO |
- Founded: 2006
- Ceased operations: September 2022
- Hubs: Jomo Kenyatta International Airport
- Fleet size: 2
- Destinations: 10
- Headquarters: Nairobi, Kenya
- Key people: Don Smith (CEO)
- Website: fly540.com

Five Forty Aviation Ltd, trading as Fly540, was a low-cost airline based in Nairobi, Kenya. It commenced operations in 2006 with both passenger and cargo services. The airline had two subsidiary airlines, Fly540 Ghana (suspended in May 2014 and since sold) and Fly540 Angola (suspended in May 2014), but had since focused its business expansion plans in East Africa. The company slogan was Your Local Airline. The airline ceased operations in September 2022, and was placed into receivership in August 2026.

== History ==
=== Initial domestic services ===
Fly540 started operations between Nairobi and Mombasa on November 24, 2006. The airline's name refers to its price of KSh5,540 per adult return fare between the above-mentioned cities.

Lonrho Africa was a major investor in the company, paying US $1.5 million for a 49% stake.

Passenger numbers rose by 93% to 171,160 in the year ending 30 September 2008, compared to 88,571 in 2007. At the same time, the load factor amounted to 63%, down from 65.8% in 2007.

=== Pan-African ambitions ===
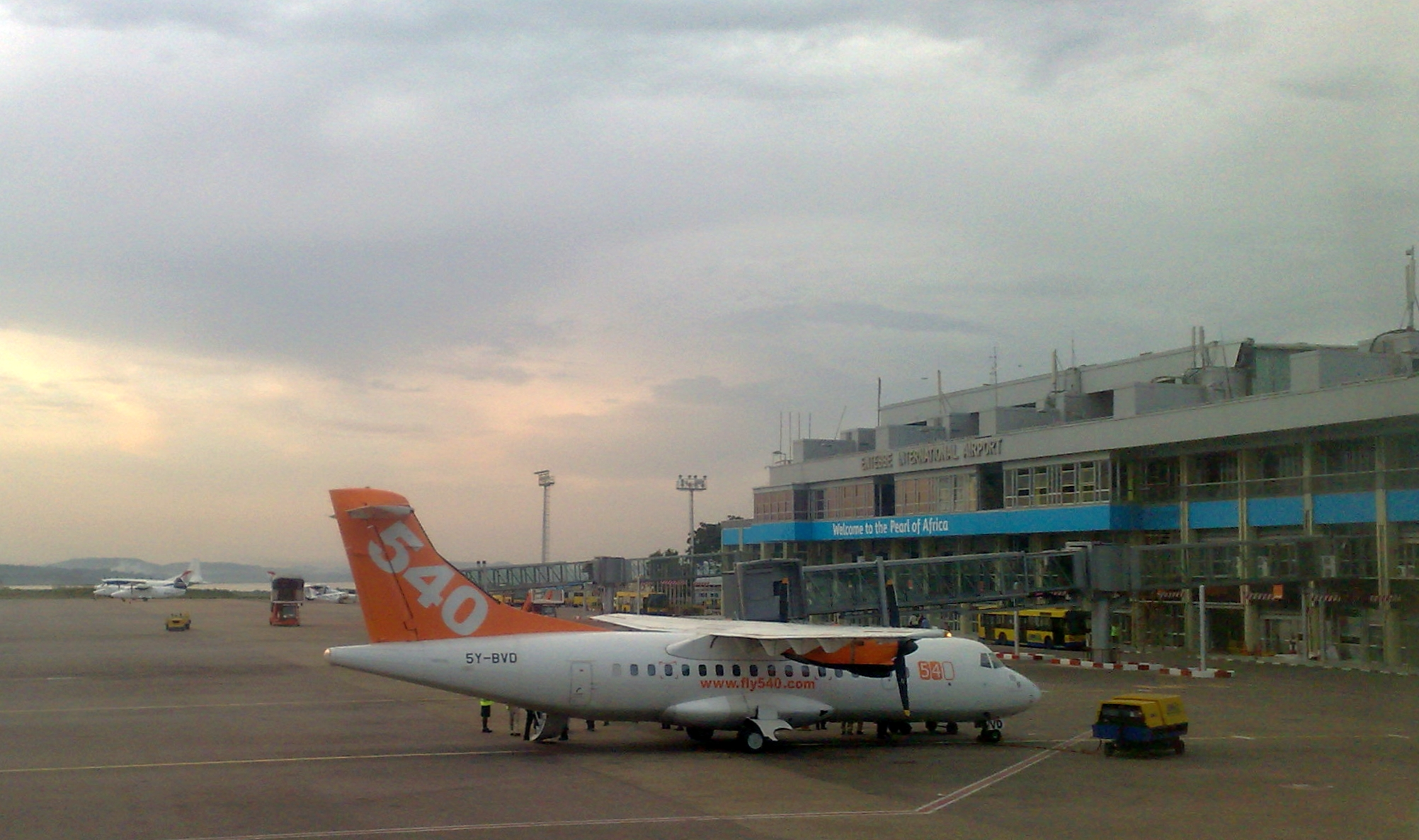
A Fly540 ATR 42 at Entebbe International Airport

The original scheduled flights included freight and passenger services between Nairobi and Mombasa, while Kisumu became a destination in January 2007. Daily flights on the Nairobi-Malindi-Lamu route were added to Fly540's domestic services in February 2007.

International operations commenced in October 2007 with flights to Juba in South Sudan and Goma in the Democratic Republic of the Congo; service to Entebbe in Uganda began in February 2008. Additionally, Fly540 Tanzania launched direct flights between Dar es Salaam and Mwanza, on the western shores of Lake Victoria.

Initially the company operated 11 flights a week and it was hoped that in time its Fokker 28 aircraft, which carried 28 people, would be upgraded to a 50-seat CRJ100.

=== Investment by Fastjet ===
In June 2012, Fly540 was sold for $85.7 million (Sh7.3 billion) to British investment firm Rubicon Diversified Investments (now Fastjet Plc), who purchased the airline from Lonrho group. Rubicon said it had chosen to acquire Fly540 as its platform for the launch of a budget airline in Africa, to be modelled on EasyJet, Europe's second largest low-cost carrier.

The first flights were transferred to the new airline, Fastjet, on 29 November 2012. These were two domestic routes in Tanzania; it had been expected that all Fly540 flights would quickly be transferred to Fastjet, in turn, as the various arrangements and permissions required for each route were agreed upon.

Following the acquisition of Lonrho's 49% interest in Five Forty Aviation Kenya Ltd, and a further 49.98% economic interest in the company approved at a Fastjet General meeting on 29 June 2012, it became apparent that the vendor did not consider the additional acquisition had completed. The dispute led to legal claims by both parties over the ownership and other matters. A Memorandum of Understanding was reached on 23 April 2013 where both parties agreed to stop legal proceedings against each other because Fastjet did not believe they had control or significant influence. As of 1 July 2014, a settlement was agreed between Fastjet and Don Smith [CEO] in which Fastjet transferred all shares in Five Forty Aviation Kenya LTD to Don Smith and Fastjet relinquished any further interest in Five Forty Aviation Ltd. The Five Forty brand name is now for sole use of Five Forty Aviation Kenya Ltd.

=== Suspension ===
Fly540's operations in Kenya were suspended in November 2022 by the country's Competition Authority following complaints over false advertising, short notice before cancellation of flights, and delayed refunds. The carrier was ordered to refund a batch of tickets sold after the date on which its Air Operators Certificate expired as well as any ticket before that date "where flights were cancelled arbitrarily."

In 2025, a Kenyan court ordered the sale of aircraft leased to Fly540.

== Corporate affairs ==
Since the acquisition of Lonrho (BVI) Ltd's interest on 29 June 2012, Five Forty Aviation Ltd is now 100% privately owned.

== Destinations ==
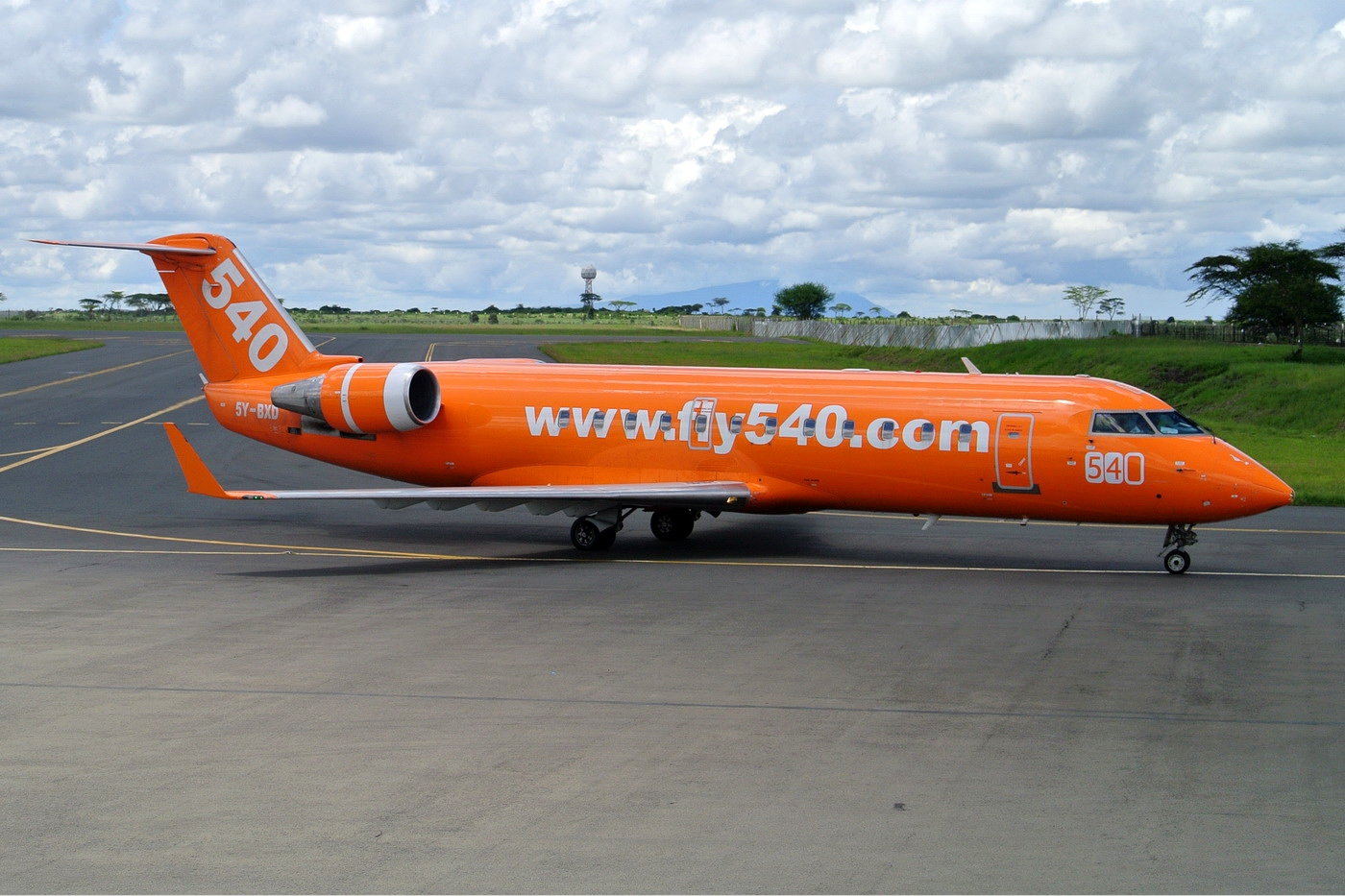
A Fly540 Canadair Regional Jet CRJ-100ER pictured at Jomo Kenyatta International Airport, Nairobi, in 2012

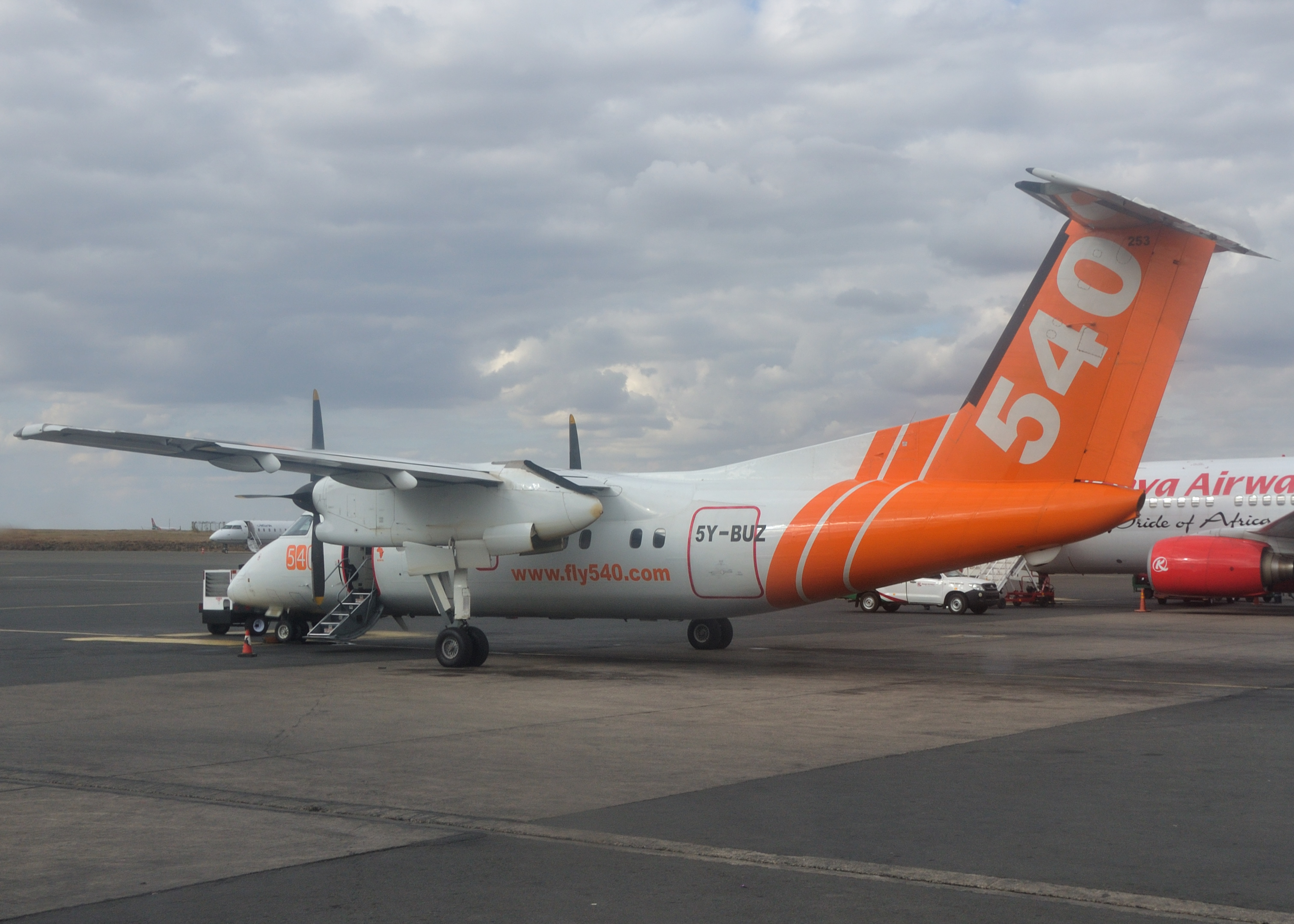
Fly540 de Havilland Canada DHC-8-100

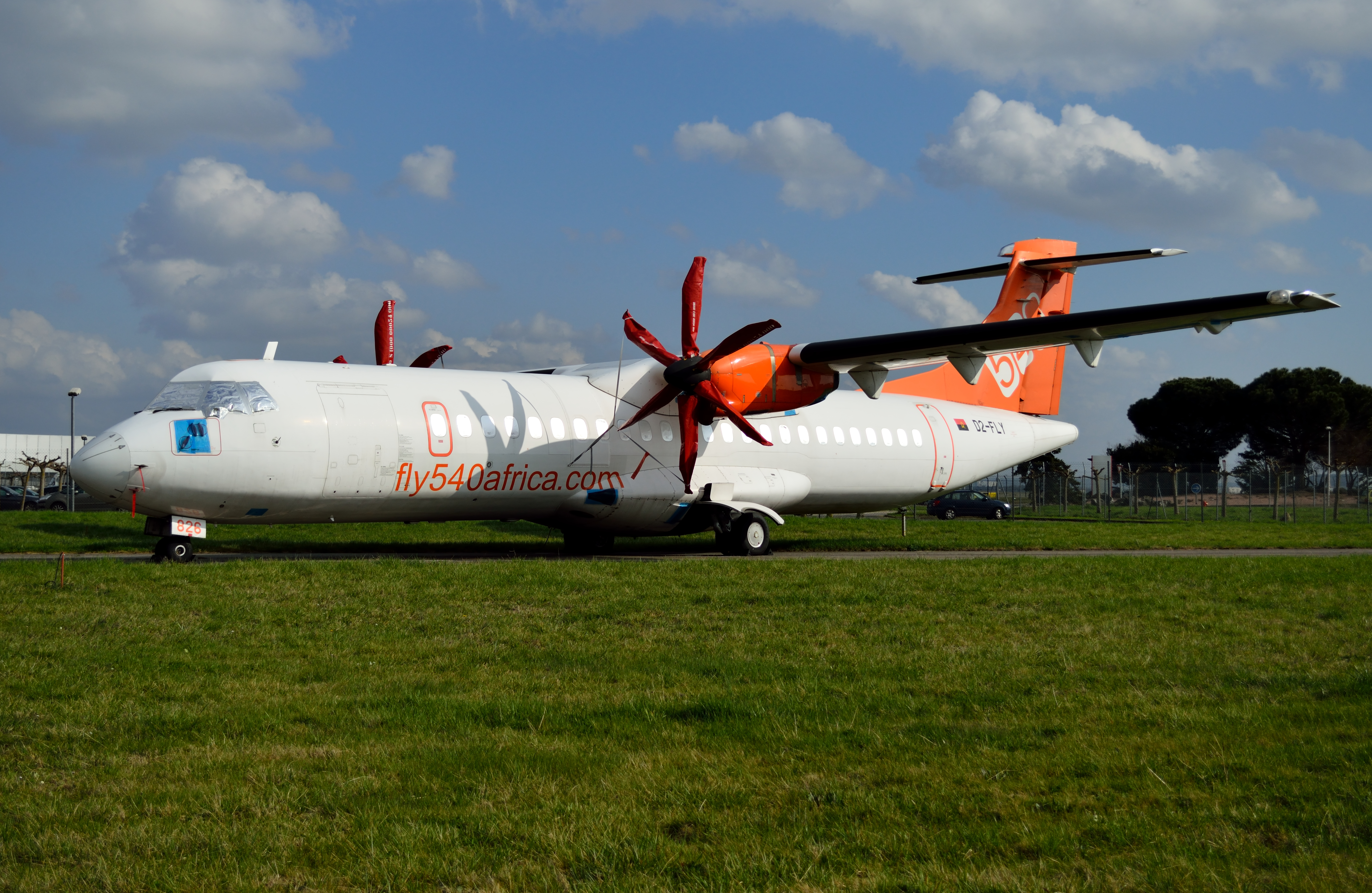
Fly540 ATR 72, stored at Toulouse airport

As of February 2016, Fly540 flies to the following destinations.

| Country | City | Airport | Notes |
|---|---|---|---|
| Kenya | Eldoret | Eldoret International Airport | |
| Kenya | Kisumu | Kisumu International Airport | |
| Kenya | Lamu | Manda Airport | |
| Kenya | Lodwar | Lodwar Airport | |
| Kenya | Malindi | Malindi Airport | |
| Kenya | Mombasa | Moi International Airport | |
| Kenya | Nairobi | Jomo Kenyatta International Airport ^{[Hub]} | |
| South Sudan | Juba | Juba International Airport | |
| Tanzania | Zanzibar | Abeid Amani Karume International Airport | |

== Fleet ==
=== Current fleet ===
As of August 2025, Fly540 operates the following aircraft:

Fly540 fleet
| Aircraft | In service | Orders | Passengers | Notes |
|---|---|---|---|---|
| Bombardier Dash 8-Q200 | 1 | — | | |
| Bombardier Dash 8-Q300 | 1 | — | | |
| Total | 2 | 0 | | |

=== Fleet development ===
In January 2008, the company signed a US$150 million contract for eight ATR 72-500s to be delivered in 2008 and 2009. These orders have since been cancelled In April 2014, Fastjet announced that two ATRs and both DC-9 aircraft were to be withdrawn from service: the ATRs are to be sold, and the DC-9s are to be returned to their lessors.

=== Former fleet ===
The airline previously operated the following aircraft:

- 2 Bombardier CRJ100ER (as of August 2017):
- 2 Bombardier CRJ200LR (as of August 2019):
- 1 Bombardier Dash 8-100

== Accidents ==
- On 13 August 2008, a Fokker F27 Friendship, registered as 5Y-BVF, flying from Nairobi Airport to K50 Airport, Somalia, crashed into a Radio masts/tower. All three occupants died.
- On 27 January 2011, a Fokker F27 FriendshipCRF, registered as 5X-FFD, overran the runway at Wilson Airport, Kenya. This was the second attempt for take-off after the first one resulted in aborting the takeoff. All four occupants survived.
- On 28 February 2020, a de Havilland Dash 8-300 operating for Fly540 experienced an engine failure while departing from Lokichar. The aircraft was operating as a charter flight to Nairobi's Wilson Airport with 49 oil workers and 5 crew members onboard. The aircraft returned to Lokichar, where it overran the runway.

== See also ==
- List of airlines of Kenya
