= Nanyuki Airport =

Airport in Kenya

Nanyuki Airfield
- IATA: NYK; ICAO: HKNL

Summary
- Airport type: Public, Civilian
- Owner: Kenya Airports Authority
- Operator: Tropic Air Kenya
- Serves: Nanyuki, and Northern Kenya
- Location: Nanyuki, Kenya
- Elevation AMSL: 6,250 ft / 1,905 m
- Coordinates: 00°03′40″S 37°02′31″E

Map
- Location of Nanyuki Airport in Kenya; Placement on map is approximate

Runways
Direction	Length		Surface
Direction	ft	m	Surface
03/21	3,900	1,200	Asphalt

Nanyuki Airport is a small domestic airport located just outside Nanyuki town in Laikipia County, Kenya. It serves as a gateway to Mount Kenya, Laikipia Plateau, and various private conservancies and lodges in the region. The airport mainly handles charter and scheduled flights from Nairobi’s Wilson Airport, operated by carriers like Tropic Air Kenya and Safarilink. It has a single runway and limited terminal facilities, catering primarily to tourism and local business travel.

== Location ==
Nanyuki Airport, (IATA: NYK, ICAO: HKNY), is in Nanyuki, Laikipia County, in the Kenyan East Rift Valley.

Located on the western foothills of Mount Kenya, it lies only 8 kilometres (5.0 mi), south of the Equator. It is approximately 140 kilometres (87 mi), by air, north of Jomo Kenyatta International Airport, the country's largest civilian airport.

== Overview ==
At 1,905 metres (6,250 ft) above sea level, the airport has a single asphalt runway which measures 1,200 metres (3,900 ft) in length.

Nanyuki Airfield is a government-owned, privately leased airfield, serving private and commercial air operators. The airfield handles mostly small, light, single-engine aircraft and some twin engined aircraft. Most traffic through Nanyuki is routed from Nairobi, carrying tourists to Mara Serena Airport, Samburu Airport, Laikipia, Lewa and Meru. The airfield is leased by Tropic Air Kenya, offering air charter and helicopter services.

== Airlines and destinations ==
Airlines	Destinations
Airkenya Express	Masai Mara, Nairobi–Wilson
Safarilink	Nairobi–Wilson
Tropic Air Kenya	Laikipia, Meru, Samburu

== Services ==
Nanyuki Airfield is open from 6 am to 6 pm daily, with all traffic reporting to the Nanyuki air traffic controller. Aircraft fuel is usually available. Barney's Restaurant is open from 8 am to 5 pm daily, serving hot and cold drinks, breakfast, lunch and snacks. The gift shop is also open daily, selling African arts, crafts and gifts.

== History and development ==
In the late 1960s, the Nanyuki Airfield was originally along the Nanyuki – Rumuruti Road. This was a grass airfield, mainly used by small, single-engine, privately owned aircraft. During the 1970s the present site was purchased by the Kenya government for military and official business and named the Laikipia Air Base.

The new civil airfield for Nanyuki was allocated along the Nanyuki – Naro Moru road about 10 kilometres (6.2 mi), outside Nanyuki, and was named Nanyuki Civil Airfield. At the time, it was almost entirely used by privately owned small, light, single-engine aircraft. The site comprised a tarmac runway and a caretaker's hut.

In the early 1990s, the airfield became home to Tropic Air Kenya – a small air charter company operating single-engine Cessna aircraft and helicopters. It is also a key airport for Air Kenya, East African Safari Air, and Fly540 who operate daily scheduled services linking Nanyuki with Nairobi, Lewa, Laikipia, Samburu, Meru and the Maasai Mara.

Offices and facilities have been built. To accommodate the many thousands of passengers that pass through the airfield each year, Tropic Air Kenya established a waiting area, with a restaurant, shop and toilet facilities.

== See also ==
- Nanyuki
- Laikipia County
- Rift Valley Province
- Kenya Airports Authority
- Kenya Civil Aviation Authority
- List of airports in Kenya
