= XLK =

XLK may refer to:

- Safarilink Aviation, the ICAO code XLK
- .xlk, a filename extension for the Microsoft Excel
