= Amboseli Airport =

Airport in Kajiado County, Kenya

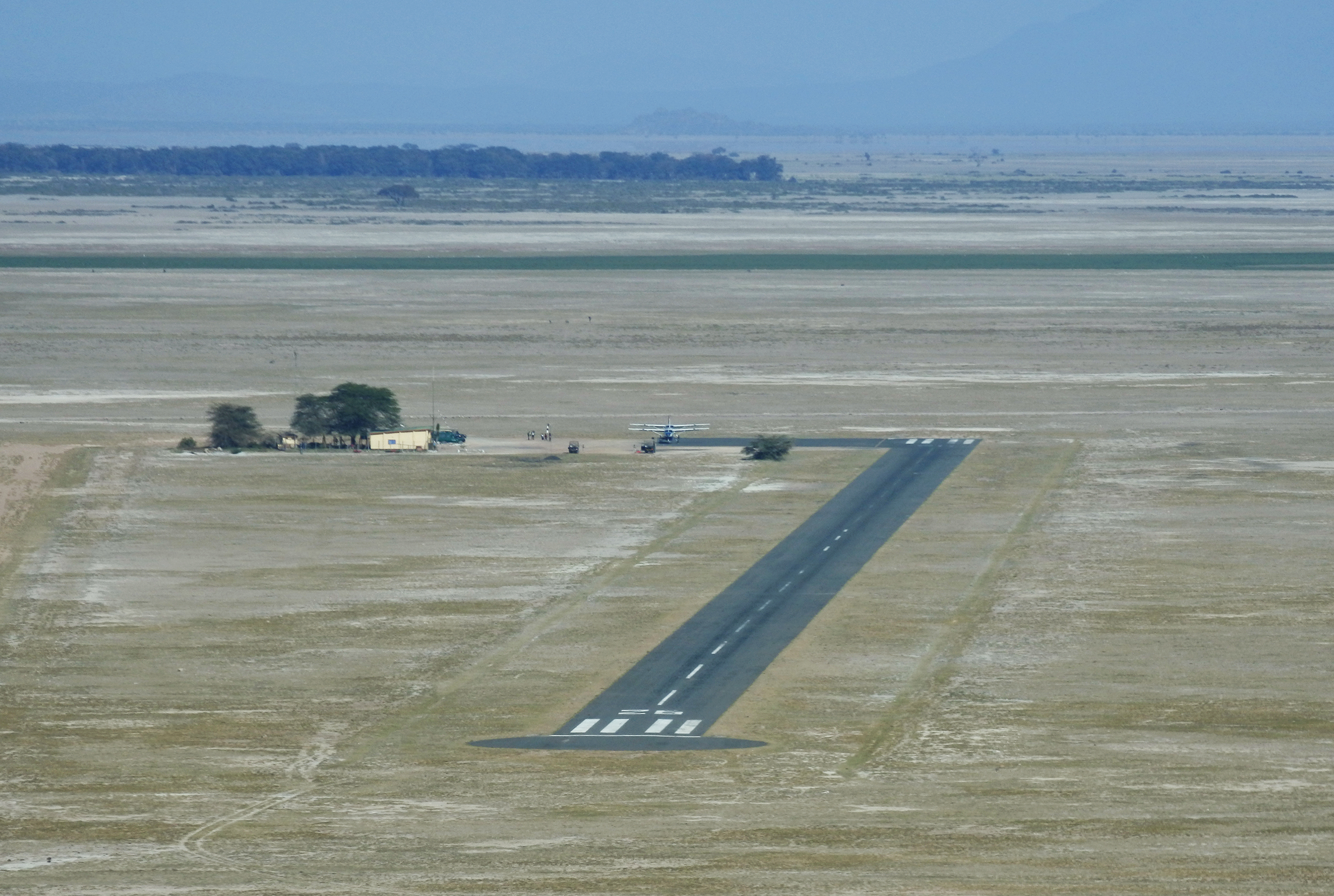
- IATA: ASV; ICAO: HKAM

Summary
- Airport type: Public, Civilian
- Owner: Kenya Civil Aviation Authority
- Serves: Amboseli, Kenya
- Location: Amboseli, Kenya
- Elevation AMSL: 3,757 ft / 1,145 m
- Coordinates: 02°38′32″S 037°15′00″E

Map
- Location of Amboseli Airport in Kenya (Placement on map is approximate)

Runways
Direction	Length		Surface
Direction	ft	m	Surface
08/26	3,871	1,180	Asphalt

Amboseli Airport (IATA: ASV, ICAO: HKAM) is an airport in Kenya.

== Location ==
Amboseli Airport is in Kajiado County, in Amboseli National Park, in south-central Kenya, close to the international border with the Republic of Tanzania.

It is approximately 156 kilometres (97 mi), by air, south of Jomo Kenyatta International Airport, the country's largest civilian airport. The geographic coordinates of Amboseli Airport are 2° 38' 42.00"S, 37° 15' 0.00"E (Latitude: -2.64500; Longitude:37.25000).

== Overview ==
Amboseli Airport serves Amboseli National Park. The small airport receives regular scheduled service from Airkenya and unscheduled service from aircharter service providers.

At 1,145 metres (3,757 ft) above sea level the airport has a single asphalt runway that measures 1,180 metres (3,870 ft) in length.

== Airlines and destinations ==
Airlines	Destinations
Airkenya Express	Nairobi–Wilson
Mombasa Air Safari	Mombasa
Safarilink	Nairobi–Wilson

== See also ==
- Amboseli National Park
- Kenya Airports Authority
- Kenya Civil Aviation Authority
- List of airports in Kenya
