= Mara Serena Airport =

Airport in Kenya

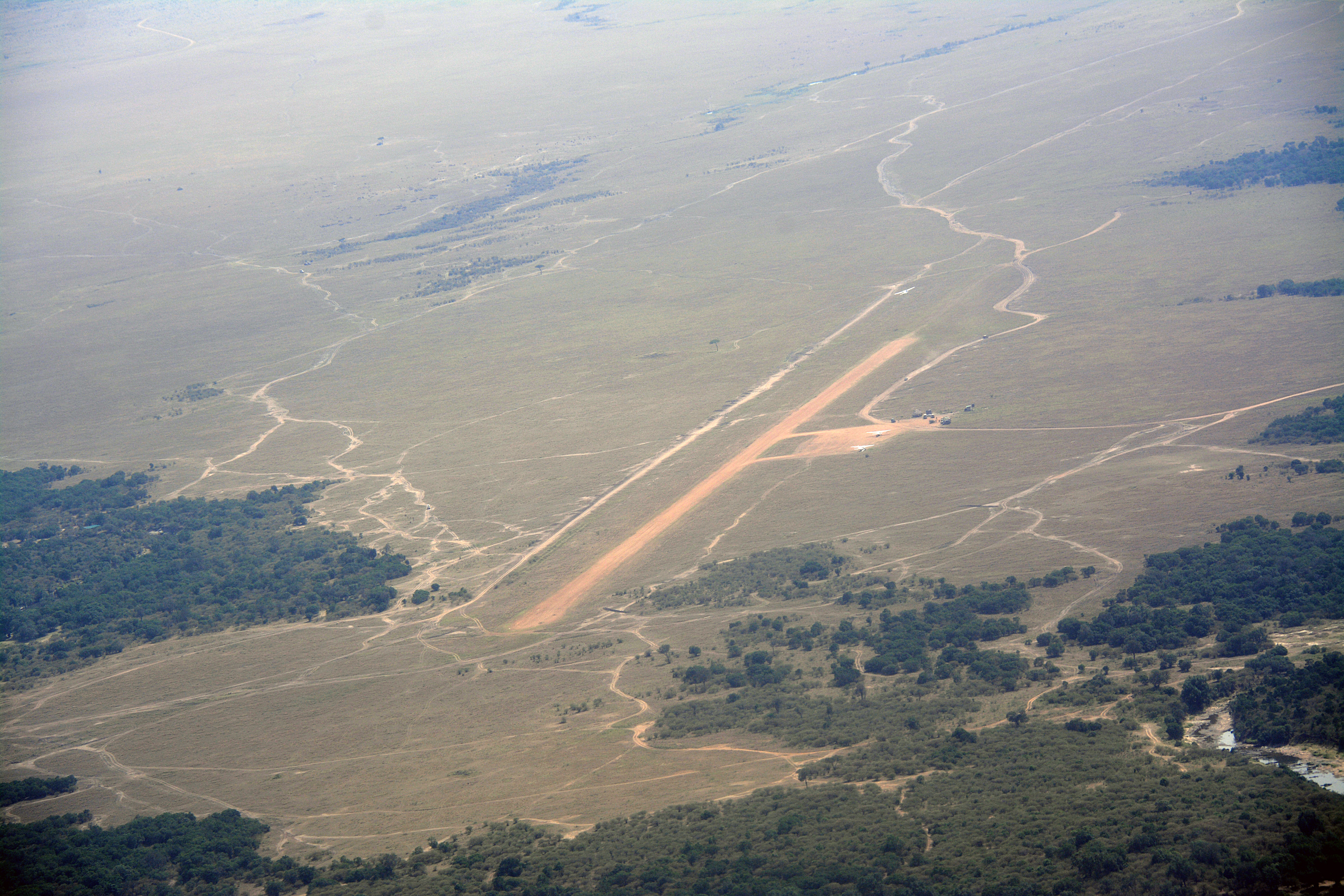
- IATA: MRE; ICAO: HKMS

Summary
- Airport type: Public, Civilian
- Owner: Kenya Airports Authority
- Serves: Maasai Mara, Kenya
- Location: Maasai Mara, Kenya
- Elevation AMSL: 5,600 ft / 1,707 m
- Coordinates: 01°24′18″S 35°00′36″E

Map
- Location of Mara Serena Airport in Kenya

Runways
Direction	Length		Surface
Direction	ft	m	Surface
09/27	3,445	1,050	Unpaved

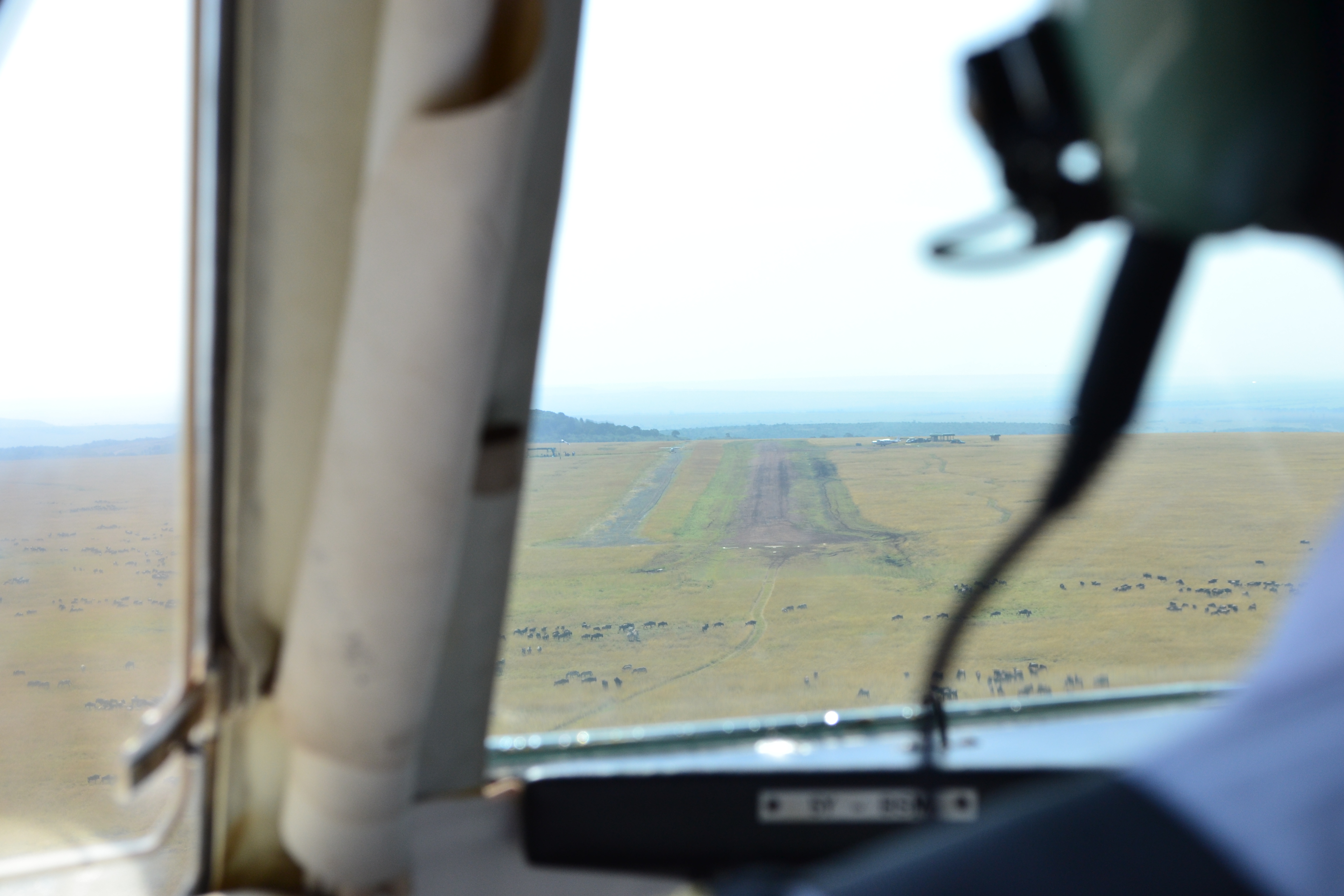
Final Approach

Mara Serena Airport is an airstrip in Maasai Mara, Kenya.

== Location ==
Mara Serena Airport (IATA: MRE, ICAO: HKMS) is located in Maasai Mara, in Narok County, in southwestern Kenya, close to the border with Tanzania.

Mara Serena Airport lies approximately 225 kilometres (140 mi) southwest of Nairobi International Airport, Kenya's largest civilian airport. The geographical coordinates of this airport are:1° 24' 18.00"S, 35° 0' 36.00"E (Latitude:-1.405000; Longitude:35.010000). Mara Serena Airport is an all weather gravel airstrip serving tourist flights to Maasai Mara. This airstrip is one of several in Maasai Mara, some of which are in fact tarmac paved airstrips such as Keekorok Airstrip. In total, Maasai Mara and the surrounding conservancies have a network of close to 10 airstrips and which one you fly to depends on which camp or lodge you will be staying at in the Reserve. A useful link has been provided below to see both a Map of the various airstrips as well as the details of each including Maasai Mara airport codes.

== Overview ==
Mara Serena Airport is a small civilian airport, serving Maasai Mara and the neighbouring communities. Situated at 1,707 metres (5,600 ft) above sea level, the airport has one unpaved runway measuring 3,445 feet (1,050 m) in length.

== Airlines and destinations ==
Airlines	Destinations
Aerolink Uganda	Entebbe
Airkenya Express	Nairobi–Wilson, Nanyuki, Samburu
Eastafrican.com	Nairobi–Wilson
Mombasa Air Safari	Mombasa
Safarilink	Lewa Downs, Migori, Nairobi–Wilson, Naivasha

== See also ==
- Maasai Mara
- Trans Mara District
- Rift Valley Province
- Kenya Airports Authority
- Kenya Civil Aviation Authority
- List of airports in Kenya
