= Lewa Airport =

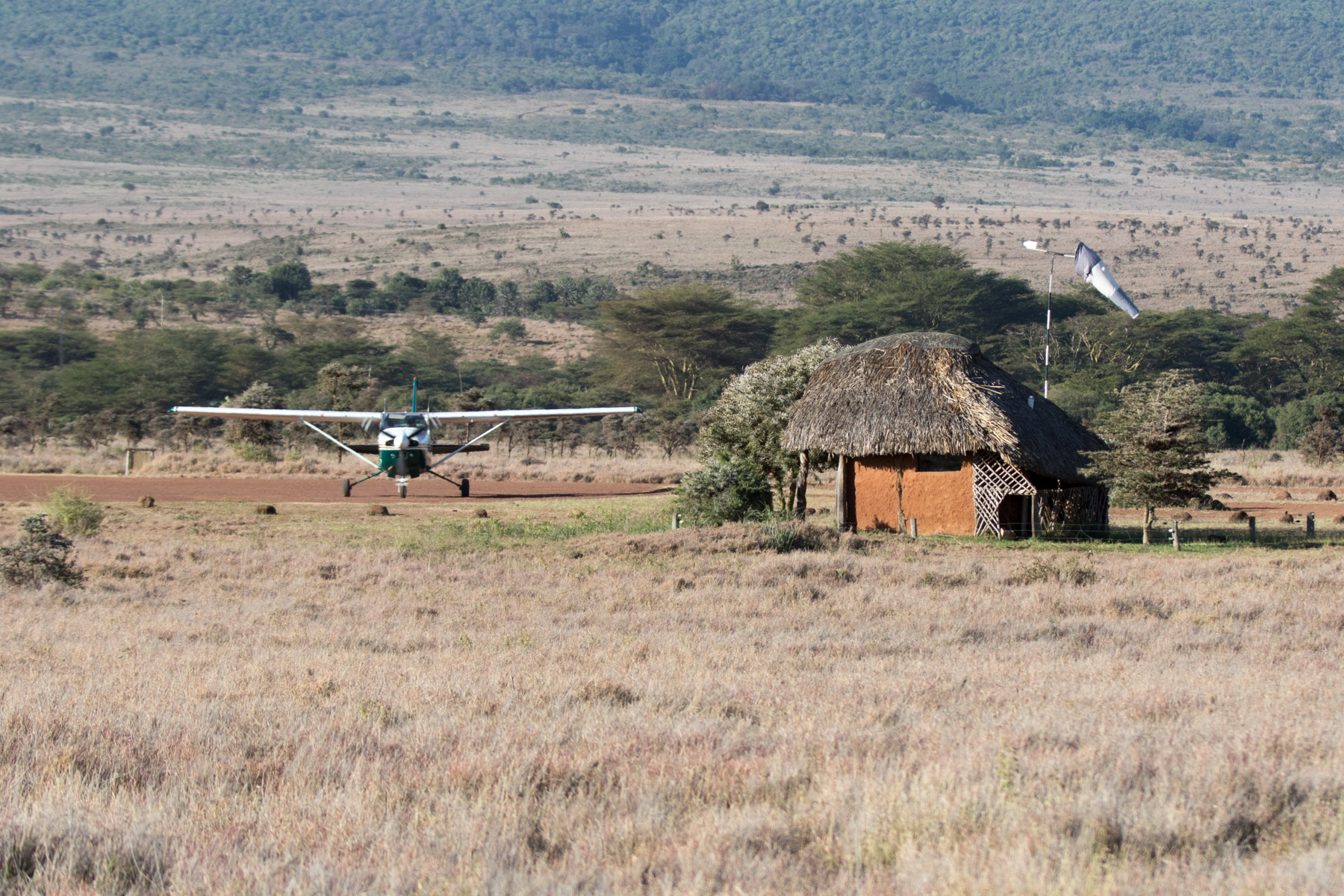
- Lewa Airport with departure lounge and plane on stand
- IATA: n/a; ICAO: n/a

Summary
- Airport type: Public, Civilian
- Owner: Kenya Airports Authority
- Serves: Lewa Wildlife Conservancy
- Location: Lewa Downs, Kenya
- Elevation AMSL: 5,500 ft / 1,700 m
- Coordinates: 00°11′34″N 37°28′21″E

Map
- Location of Lewa Airport in Kenya; Placement on map is approximate

Runways
| Direction | Length | | Surface |
| Direction | ft | m | Surface |
|---|---|---|---|
| 14/32 | 4,100 | 1,200 | Unpaved |

Lewa Airport is an airport in Kenya.

== Location ==
Lewa Airport (IATA: n/a, ICAO: n/a) is located in Lewa Wildlife Conservancy, in Isiolo District, Eastern Province (Kenya).

Its location is approximately 198 kilometres (123 mi), by air, north of Nairobi International Airport, the country's largest civilian airport. The geographic coordinates of Lewa Airport are: 0° 11' 34.00"N, 37° 28' 21.00"E (Latitude:0.192778; Longitude:37.472500).

== Overview ==
Lewa Airport is a small civilian airport, serving Lewa Wildlife Conservancy and surrounding communities. Situated at 5,500 feet (1,700 m) above sea level, the airport has an unpaved runway that measures 4,100 feet (1,200 m) in length.

== Airlines and destinations ==
| Airlines | Destinations |
|---|---|
| Airkenya Express | Nairobi–Wilson |
| Safarilink | Maasai Mara, Nairobi–Wilson |

== See also ==
- Lewa Wildlife Conservancy
- Isiolo District
- Eastern Province (Kenya)
- Kenya Airports Authority
- Kenya Civil Aviation Authority
- List of airports in Kenya
