= Renegade Air =

Kenyan airline

IATA	ICAO	Call sign
—	RNG	RENEGADE
- Founded: 2012
- Hubs: Wilson Airport
- Fleet size: 20
- Destinations: 3 (WIL, KIS, WJR, HBY)
- Headquarters: Nairobi, Kenya
- Website: flyrenegadeair.com

Renegade Air (ICAO: RNG) is a regional airline based at Wilson Airport in Nairobi, Kenya. Renegade Air was founded in 2012. It now serves the market between Wilson Airport, Wajir Airport and Kisumu International Airport, using Bombardier Dash 8-Q300 aircraft along these routes. Aside from scheduled passenger services they offer private charters, ACMI Leasing, Evacuation and Relief services.

== Fleet ==
=== Current fleet ===
As of July 2026, Renegade Air operates the following aircraft:

Renegade Air fleet
Aircraft	In fleet	Orders	Notes
ATR 42-300F	3	—	
ATR 42-500	1	—	
ATR 72-500F	1	—	
Bombardier CRJ100ER	1	—	
Bombardier CRJ200LR	1	—	
De Havilland Canada DHC-8-100	5	—	
De Havilland Canada DHC-8-300	2	—	
De Havilland Canada DHC-8-Q200	1	—	
Fokker 50	4	—	
Fokker 70	1	—	
Total	20		

== Accidents and incidents ==
- 9 August 2024: A de Haviland Dash 8-300, 5Y-SMI, operating for the United Nations Humanitarian Air Service, lost all landing gear wheels during takeoff from Maban, South Sudan. The aircraft continued to its destination, Malakal Airport, and made a no-gear landing after burning off fuel. All 35 people on board survived.
