= Ukunda Airport =

Airport in Kenya

Diani Airport
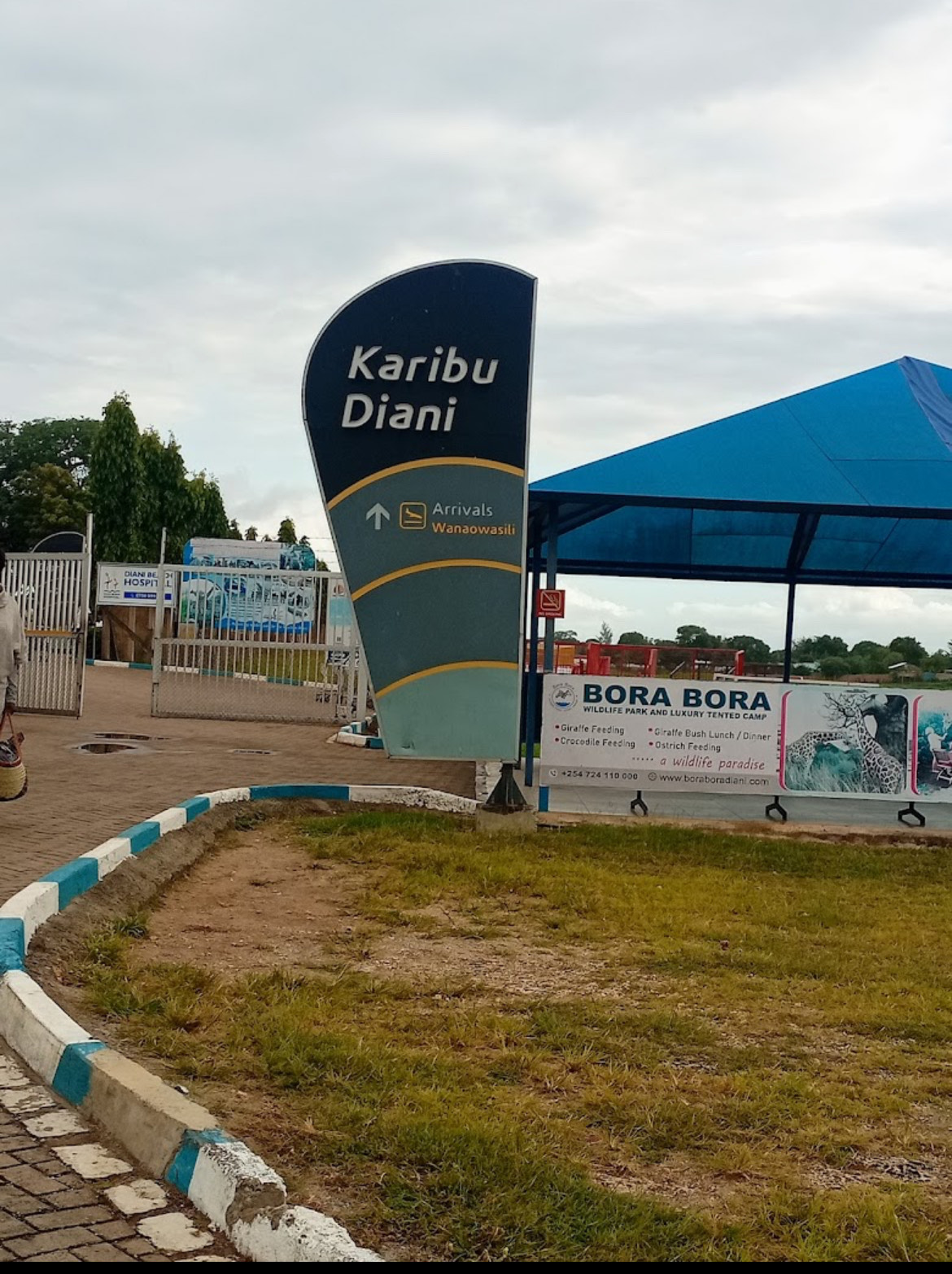
- IATA: UKA; ICAO: HKUK

Summary
- Airport type: Public
- Owner: Kenya Airports Authority
- Location: Diani, Kwale County, Kenya
- Elevation AMSL: 98 ft (30 m)
- Coordinates: 4°17′49″S 39°34′17″E
- Website: https://dianiairport.com

Map
- Location within Kenya

Runways
Direction	Length		Surface
Direction	m	ft	Surface
01/19	1,174	3,851	Tarmac

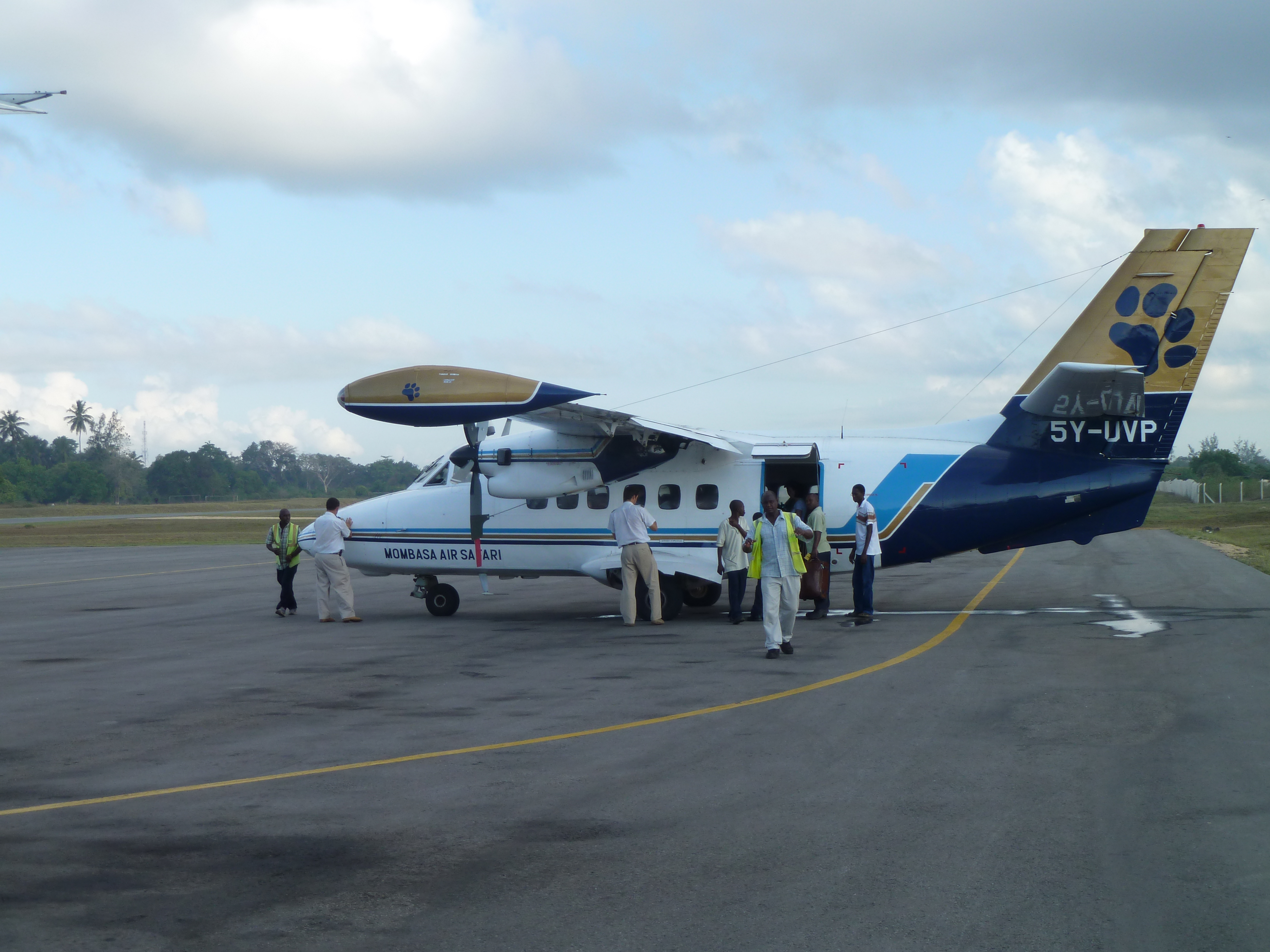
Ukunda Airport, Kenya

Ukunda Airport (IATA: UKA, ICAO: HKUK) is a regional airport near Diani Beach in Kwale County, Kenya. The airport serves the local areas of Diani, Ukunda, Tiwi and Msambweni.

The airport operates under the name Diani Airport.

== Services ==
The airport started operating Air Kenya services to and from Nairobi's Wilson airport in 2013. Many services used to be private charter, providing tourist access between beach resorts and inland game reserves.

The start of budget airlines that ferry domestic and international tourists back and forth to Nairobi has sped up the development of Diani Beach as the main tourist beach hub in Kenya.

Diani Beach Airport operates daily flights from Nairobi Wilson (WIL) and Nairobi Jomo Kenyatta (NBO), and flights to the Masai Mara, Moi International Airport Mombasa (MBA) and Kilifi.

The Kenya Airports Authority has reported its intention to extend the runway, allowing access to larger aircraft. It is then expected that the airport will offer flights to Zanzibar, Arusha and Dar es Salaam.

In January 2019, the Kenya Civil Aviation Authority (KCAA), commissioned a mobile airport control tower, procured at a price of KSh150 million (approx. US$1.5 million), for use at this airstrip.

== Expansion ==
An expansion programme began in 2020. The first phase, completed in November 2023 at a cost of KSh173 million, included a 200-metre runway extension and construction of an apron.

The expansion includes a new taxiway and an extended runway, allowing larger aircraft to use the airport. A new terminal building is planned in the next phase of the expansion, with direct international flights as the ultimate declared goal.

== Airlines and destinations ==
Airlines	Destinations
748 Air	Nairobi–Jomo Kenyatta
Jambojet	Nairobi–Jomo Kenyatta
Mombasa Air Safari	Mombasa, Maasai Mara, Amboseli, Tsavo West (Finch Hattons)
Safarilink	Nairobi–Wilson
Skyward Express	Nairobi–Wilson
Fly ALS	Nairobi–Wilson (seasonal)

== Accidents ==
At 14:15 EAT on 28 November 2002, an Eagle Aviation Let L-410 Turbolet en route to Ukunda from Musiara Airstrip crashed at Mara Intrepids Airstrip after developing engine problems. The crew had decided to attempt an emergency landing, but crashed before landing. There was one fatality, a crew member; the other 18 passengers and remaining crew members survived.
