= Malakal Airport =

Airport in South Sudan

Malakal Airport Estb.1934
- IATA: MAK; ICAO: HSSM

Summary
- Airport type: Public, Civilian
- Owner: Civil Aviation Authority of South Sudan
- Serves: Malakal, South Sudan
- Elevation AMSL: 1,290 ft (390 m)
- Coordinates: 09°33′32″N 031°39′08″E

Map
- Location of airport in South Sudan

Runways
Direction	Length		Surface
Direction	m	ft	Surface
05/23	2,000	6,562	Asphalt

Malakal Airport (IATA: MAK, ICAO: HSSM) is an airport serving Malakal, a city in Malakal County in the Upper Nile State of South Sudan. The airport is located just north of the city's central business district, adjacent to the main campus of Upper Nile University. Malakal is near the international border with the Republic of Sudan and the border with Ethiopia.

Malakal is the smaller of two international airports in South Sudan. The largest, Juba International Airport, lies approximately 521 kilometres (281 NM) to the south in the capital city of Juba.

As part of the United Nations Mission in Sudan (UNMIS), the airport was a major staging point for United Nation operations to South Sudan and will continue to do so under the new United Nations Mission in South Sudan (UNMISS) mandate.

== Facilities ==
The airport resides at an elevation of 1,291 feet (393 m) above mean sea level. It has one runway designated 05/23 with an asphalt surface measuring 2,000 by 38 metres (6,562 ft × 125 ft).

== Accidents and incidents ==
- 10 November 2015: A Hawker Siddeley HS-780 Andover, TL-AEW, impacted a field and burned, shortly after takeoff from Malakal Airport. All four crew members survived the accident; however, the airplane was consumed by fire.
- 9 February 2024: An African Express Airways McDonnell Douglas MD-82, 5Y-AXL, sustained substantial damage when it was involved in an accident when the main gear collapsed and the airplane came to rest on its belly short of runway 4. There were no injuries.
- 31 March 2024: A Safe Air Boeing 727-200F, 5Y-IRE, collided with the MD-82 while attempting to land at the airport.
- 9 August 2024: A Renegade Air de Haviland Dash 8-300, 5Y-SMI, operating for the United Nations Humanitarian Air Service, made a no-gear landing after losing all landing gear wheels during takeoff from Maban. All 35 people on board survived.

== See also ==
- Malakal
- Upper Nile State
- Greater Upper Nile
- List of airports in South Sudan
