= Malindi Airport =

Airport in Kenya

Malindi International Airport
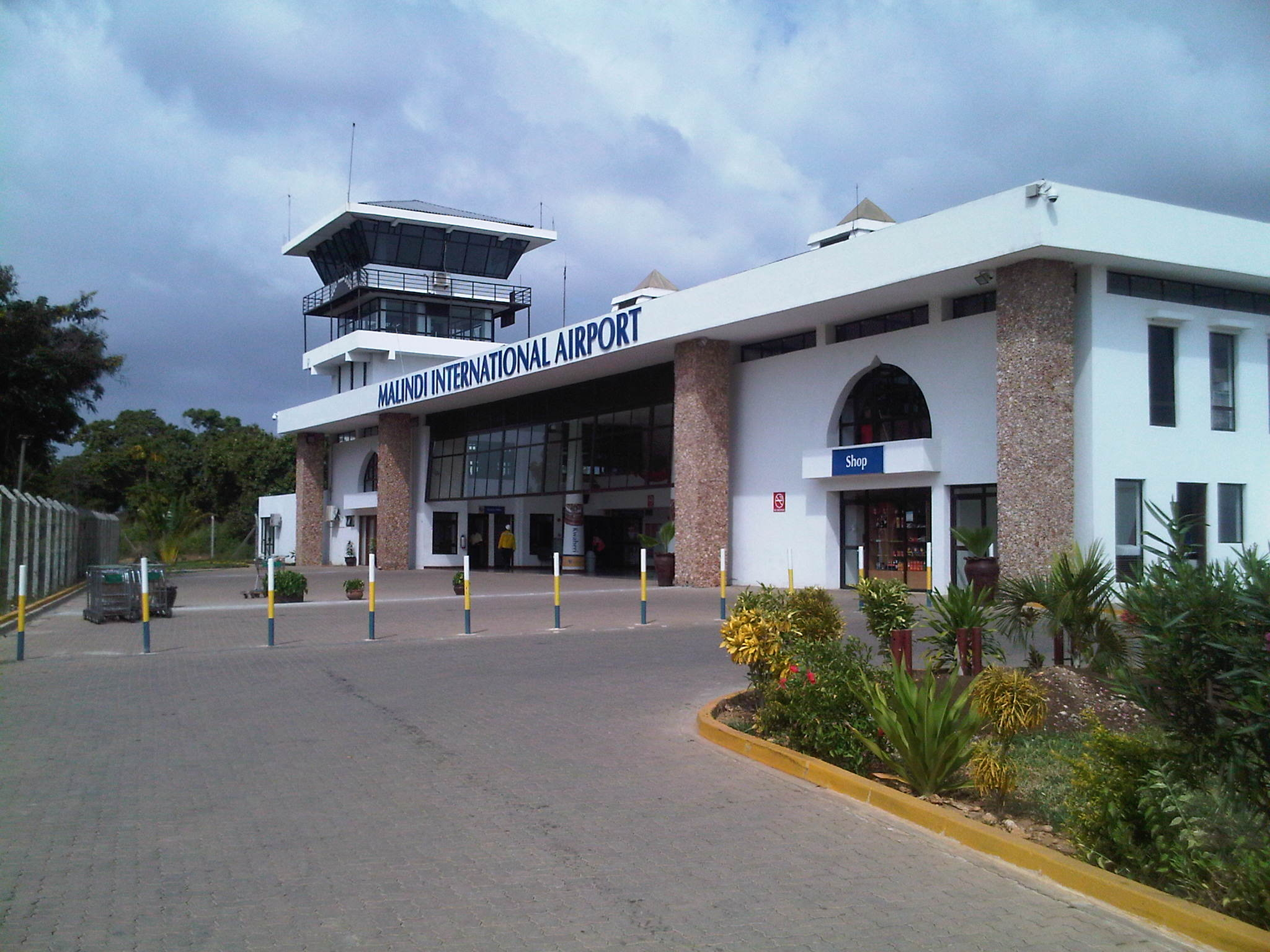
- Terminal building at Malindi International Airport (January 2015)
- IATA: MYD; ICAO: HKML

Summary
- Airport type: Public, Civilian
- Operator: Kenya Airports Authority
- Serves: Malindi
- Location: Malindi, Kenya
- Elevation AMSL: 80 ft (24 m)
- Coordinates: 03°12′54″S 40°06′00″E

Map
- Location of airport in Kenya

Runways
Direction	Length		Surface
Direction	ft	m	Surface
17/35	4,600	1,400	Asphalt
08/26	3,549	1,082	Asphalt

== Overview ==
Malindi International Airport (IATA: MYD, ICAO: HKML) is an airport in Kenya. It serves the coastal towns of Malindi, Watamu, Mambrui, and the greater northern coast tourism circuit.

It is located west of the central business district of the town of Malindi, in Kilifi County, in southeastern Kenya, at the Indian Ocean coast.

The airport mainly handles domestic flights, with the length of its runway limiting larger aircraft. While international visitors generally arrive through Nairobi or Mombasa, the airport is a designated international port of entry with immigration services.

== Expansion ==
The airport was expanded with a new terminal building, control tower, and rehabilitation of the runways in 2011 and 2012. A KES 242.8 million project to resurface the main runway and apron was reported 60 per cent complete in April 2026.

Further expansion of the airport has been delayed by land acquisition and compensation disputes. In December 2025, the national and Kilifi County governments announced plans to extend the runway, modernize the terminal and upgrade navigation systems to accommodate larger aircraft and direct international flights.

In March 2026, the government announced that land would be acquired to extend the main runway from 1.4 km to three km. Compensation remained unresolved as of July 2026.

== Airlines and destinations ==
Airlines	Destinations
Safarilink	Nairobi–Wilson, Lamu
Skyward Express	Nairobi–Wilson, Lamu
Jambojet	Nairobi–Jomo Kenyatta
Mombasa Air Safari	Lamu, Mombasa
