= Skyward Airlines =

Private airline in Kenya

Coordinates: 01°19′22″S 36°48′27″E

Skyward Airlines Ltd
IATA	ICAO	Call sign
OW	SEW	—
- Founded: 2013
- Operating bases: Wilson Airport (Passenger); Jomo Kenyatta International Airport (Cargo)
- Focus cities: Nairobi, Mombasa, Malindi
- Fleet size: 13
- Destinations: 9
- Headquarters: Wilson Airport
- Key people: Mohamed Abdi (Chairman)
- Website: Official website

Skyward Airlines, (IATA: OW, ICAO: SEW), is a private airline operating in Kenya. It provides scheduled passenger and cargo services from its two main operational bases at Wilson Airport (for passenger services) and Jomo Kenyatta International Airport (for cargo operations), both located in Nairobi, the capital city of Kenya.

== Location ==
The airline's headquarters are located at Wilson Airport, within Nairobi. Wilson Airport lies approximately 5 kilometres (3 mi) southwest of the city centre by road.

Skyward Airlines operates from a dedicated facility at Wilson Airport, exclusively for its staff and clients. The building includes modern passenger amenities such as a cafeteria.

== History ==
Skyward Airlines was founded in 2013 by two Kenyan pilots, one of whom currently serves as the chairman and the other as the managing director. The airline inherited some equipment and routes from the now-defunct Skyward International Aviation.

In April 2025, the airline officially rebranded under the name Skyward Airlines.

Following its establishment, Skyward Airlines began commercial operations providing passenger, charter, and cargo services between Nairobi and destinations in neighboring Somalia, including the transport of miraa from Nairobi. With time and fleet expansion, the airline diversified its network to include routes to oil-producing counties in northwestern Kenya and key coastal tourist destinations.

== Destinations ==
As of April 2025, Skyward Airlines operates scheduled services to the following destinations:

- Kenya
  - Nairobi – Wilson Airport (Passenger hub) / Jomo Kenyatta International Airport (Cargo hub)
  - Eldoret – Eldoret International Airport
  - Lodwar – Lodwar Airport
  - Mombasa – Moi International Airport
  - Malindi – Malindi Airport
  - Lamu – Lamu Airport
  - Ukunda – Ukunda Airport
  - Kakamega – Kakamega Airstrip
  - Kitale – Kitale Airport
  - Migori – Migori Airport
  - Dar es Salaam – Julius Nyerere International Airport

== Fleet ==
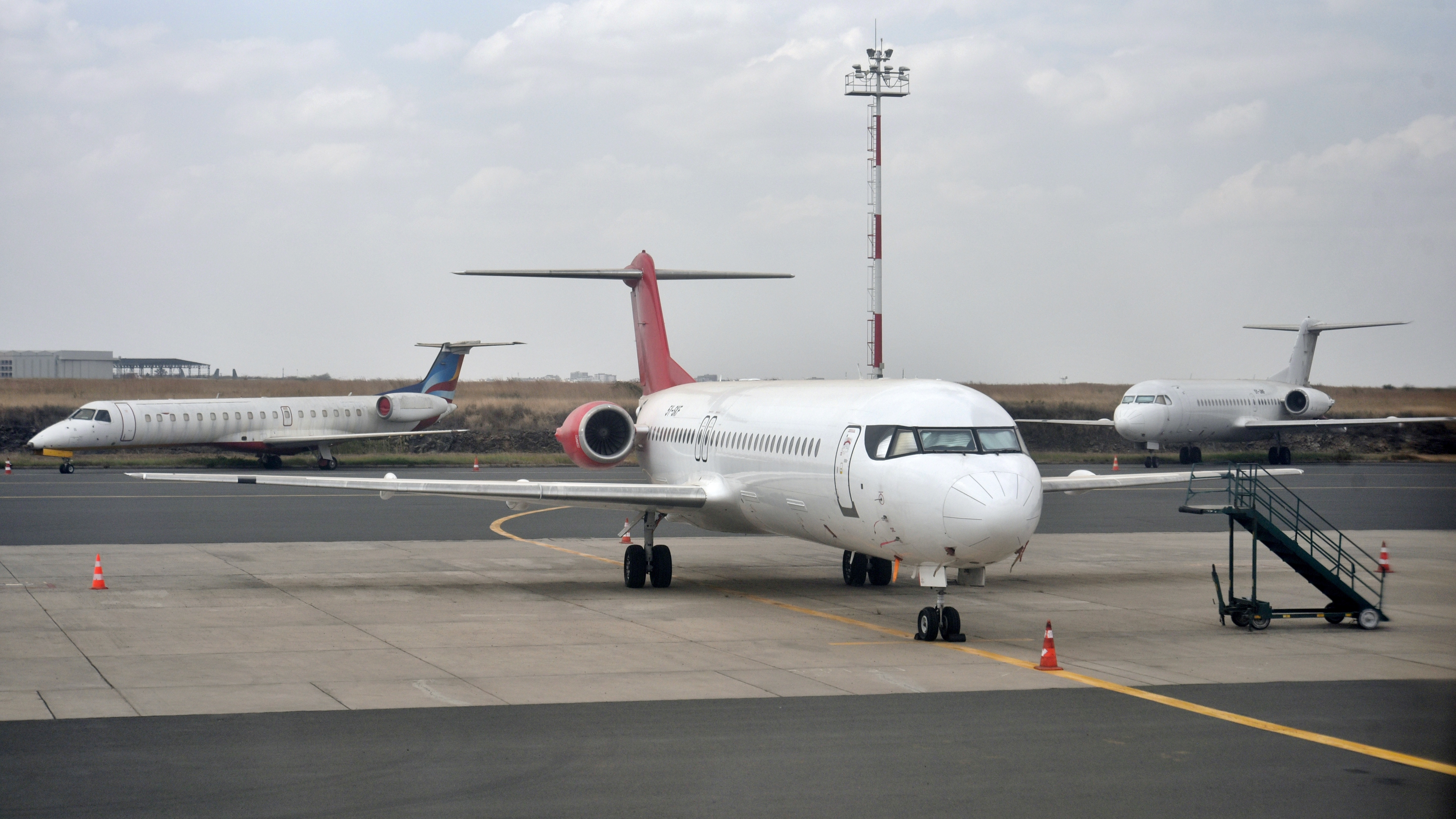
A Skyward Airlines Fokker 100 at Jomo Kenyatta International Airport, Nairobi, Kenya, in 2025

As of July 2026, Skyward Airlines operates the following aircraft:

Skyward Airlines fleet
Aircraft	In fleet	Passengers
Fokker 50	3	50
Fokker 70	2	70
Fokker 100	2	110
Dash 8-100	2	
Dash 8-300	1	
Dash 8-Q200	1	
Dash 8-Q400	2	
Total	13	

== Accidents and incidents ==
- On 21 July 2021, a De Havilland Canada Dash 8-100 (registration 5Y-GRS) operated by Skyward Airlines crash-landed at El Wak, Kenya, when its landing gear collapsed.

== See also ==
- List of airlines of Kenya
- Airlines of Africa
