= Samburu Airport =

Airport in Samburu County, Kenya

- IATA: UAS; ICAO: HKSB

Summary
- Airport type: Public, Civilian
- Owner: Kenya Airports Authority
- Serves: Samburu, Kenya
- Location: Samburu, Kenya
- Elevation AMSL: 3,294 ft / 1,004 m
- Coordinates: 00°31′09″N 37°31′48″E

Map
- Location of Samburu Airport in Kenya; Placement on map is approximate

Runways
Direction	Length		Surface
Direction	ft	m	Surface
12/30	2,650	810	Asphalt

Samburu Airport is an airport in Samburu County, Kenya.

== Location ==
Samburu Airport (IATA: UAS, ICAO: HKSB) is located in Samburu National Reserve, Samburu County, Rift Valley Province, near the geographical center of the Republic of Kenya.

Located 231 kilometres (144 mi), by air, north of Nairobi International Airport. The geographic coordinates of this airport are:0° 32' 9.00"N, 37° 31' 48.00"E (Latitude:0.535835; Longitude:37.530000).

== Overview ==
Samburu Airport is a small civilian airport, serving Samburu National Reserve. Situated 1,004 metres (3,294 ft) above sea level, the airport has a single asphalt runway that measures 2,650 feet (810 m) long.

== Airlines and destinations ==
Airlines	Destinations
Airkenya Express	Masai Mara, Nairobi–Wilson
Safarlink	Nairobi–Wilson

== See also ==
- Samburu National Reserve
- Samburu County
- Rift Valley Province
- Kenya Airports Authority
- Kenya Civil Aviation Authority
- List of airports in Kenya
