= Kisumu International Airport =

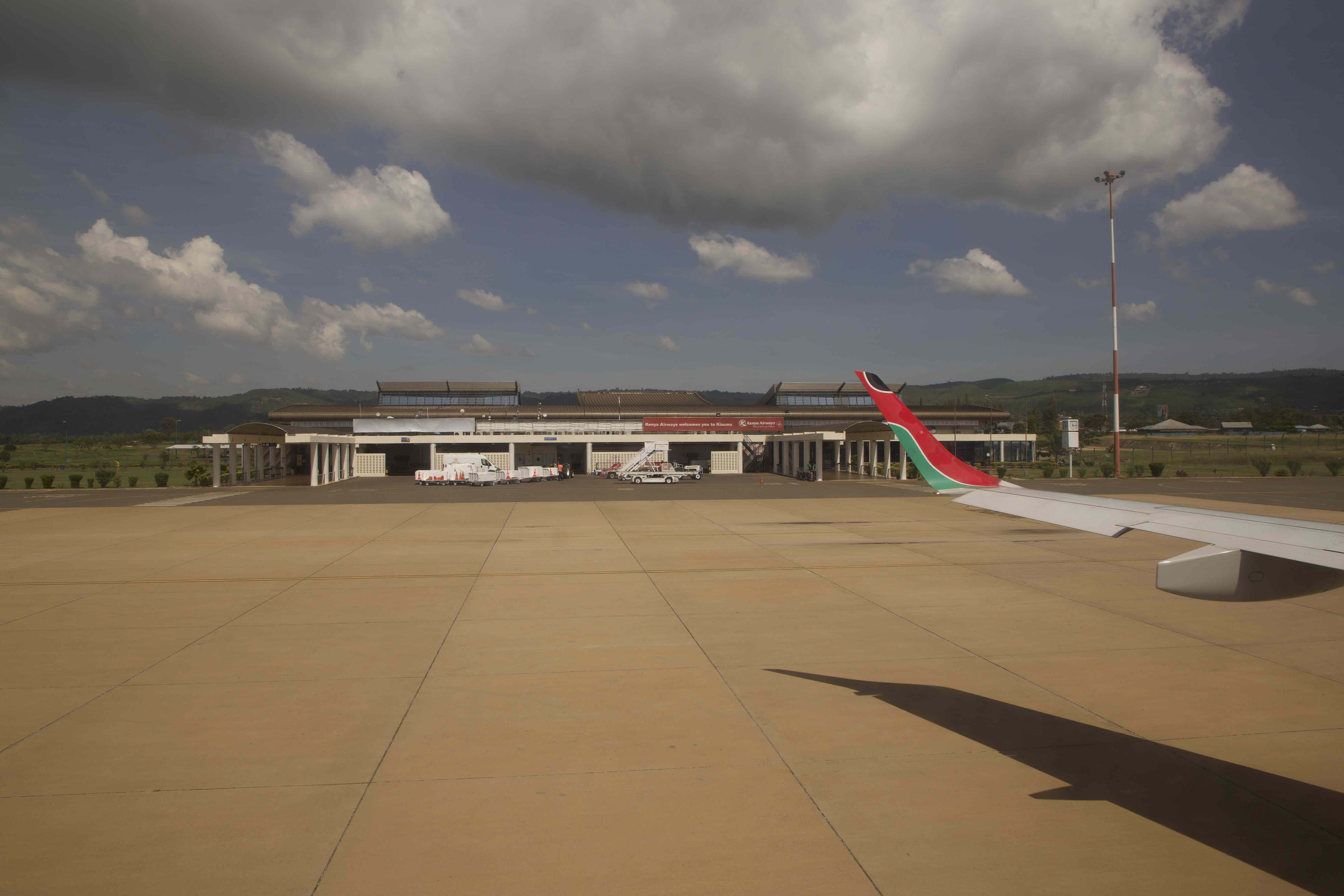
- IATA: KIS; ICAO: HKKI

Summary
- Airport type: Civil
- Operator: Kenya Airports Authority
- Location: Kisumu
- Elevation AMSL: 3,796 ft (1,157 m)
- Coordinates: 00°05′10″S 34°43′44″E
- Website: www.kenyaairports.co.ke

Map
- Location of airport in Kenya

Runways
Direction	Length		Surface
Direction	ft	m	Surface
06/24	10,826	3,300	Asphalt

Statistics (2013)
- Passenger numbers: 401,300

Kisumu International Airport is an international airport in Kisumu, the third-largest city in Kenya (IATA: KIS, ICAO: HKKI). It is the third-busiest airport in Kenya, the busiest airport in Kenya west of Nairobi, and the country's fourth international airport.

KIA is set for a second phase of a 4.9 billion shilling expansion that will include the construction of a parallel taxiway, cargo apron and associated facilities.

== Airlines and destinations ==
Airlines	Destinations
Jambo Jet	Mombasa, Nairobi–Jomo Kenyatta
Kenya Airways	Nairobi–Jomo Kenyatta
Renegade Air	Nairobi–Wilson
Safarilink	Entebbe, Nairobi–Wilson
