= Wajir Airport =

Airport in Wajir County, Kenya

- IATA: WJR; ICAO: HKWJ

Summary
- Airport type: Public, Civilian
- Owner: Kenya Airports Authority
- Serves: Wajir
- Location: Wajir County, Kenya
- Elevation AMSL: 757 ft / 231 m
- Coordinates: 01°43′48″N 40°05′24″E

Map
- Location of the Airport in Kenya

Runways
Direction	Length		Surface
Direction	ft	m	Surface
15/33	9,170	2,795	Asphalt

Statistics (2013)
- Passenger numbers: 123,000 (2015/2016)

Wajir Airport is an airport in Wajir County, Kenya.

== Location ==
Wajir Airport (IATA: WJR, ICAO: HKWJ) is located in Wajir town. Traditionally inhabited by ethnic Borana and later Somalis, the area lies near the Jubbada Hoose region of southern Somalia.

By air, Wajir Airport is situated approximately 495 kilometres (308 mi) northeast of Jomo Kenyatta International Airport, Kenya's largest civilian airport. Situated 231 metres (758 ft) above sea level, the airport has a single asphalt runway measuring 2,795 metres (9,170 ft) in length. The geographical coordinates of this airport are: 1° 43' 48.00"N, 40° 5' 24.00"E (latitude:1.73000; longitude:40.09000).

== History ==
The Wajir Airport was built by an Israeli construction Company HZ between 1977 and 1978, as a military airbase for the Kenya Air Force.

In November 2006, the Kenyan government decided to suspend direct scheduled flights to and from Somalia owing to security concerns vis-a-vis the then existing Islamic Courts Union. Following pressure by politically influential Somali traders to resume the cargo flights, the Kenya Civil Aviation Authority (KCAA) lifted its suspension a few months later in August 2007. It also indicated that all flights should thereafter stop at the Wajir Airport for customs, immigration and security screening before continuing onto their final destination. The Kenyan authorities subsequently outsourced the construction of a new terminal in the airport and assigned KCAA, customs, immigration and security officials to operate in the facility. On 7 September 2007, the Wajir Airport was commissioned to officially accommodate both passenger and military flights.

In 2012, US Navy Seabees built a new tarmac runway that can take heavy aircraft.

== Facilities and staff ==
The airport has about 100 workers, mainly consisting of police officers. There are two military camps situated within the airport's limits. An army camp is located on the western side of the terminal building, with an air force compound approximately 0.5 kilometres (500 m), south of the perimeter fence. Security personnel guard the airport's only entrance to assure security.

== Airlines and destinations ==
Wajir Airport handles about seven flights per day. As of September 2012, civil flights are offered twice a week by Echo. Most flights, however, are cargo. Some charter and military flights are additionally accommodated. As of August 2021, flights from Somalia have had to make a stop-over at Wajir Airport.

Airlines	Destinations
Fly-SAX	Nairobi–Jomo Kenyatta, Nairobi–Wilson
Jambojet	Nairobi–Jomo Kenyatta

== See also ==
- List of airports in Kenya
