= Timbis Air =

Kenyan airline

IATA	ICAO	Call sign
2T	TBS	TIMBIS
- Founded: November 2009
- Hubs: Jomo Kenyatta International Airport
- Fleet size: 8
- Parent company: Kenya Homes Limited
- Headquarters: Nairobi, Kenya
- Website: timbisair.com

Timbis Air is a regional airline based in Nairobi, Kenya founded in November 2009 that operates regional regular schedule and charter services. Its main base is Jomo Kenyatta International Airport, Nairobi.

== Fleet ==
The Timbis Air fleet consists of the following aircraft (as of February 2020):

Timbis fleet
Aircraft	In service	Orders	Passengers	Notes
CRJ 100	2	—		
Boeing 727	2	—		
Cessna 208 Caravan	2	—		
Antonov 26	2	—		
Total	8			
