= Eldoret International Airport =

International airport in Eldoret

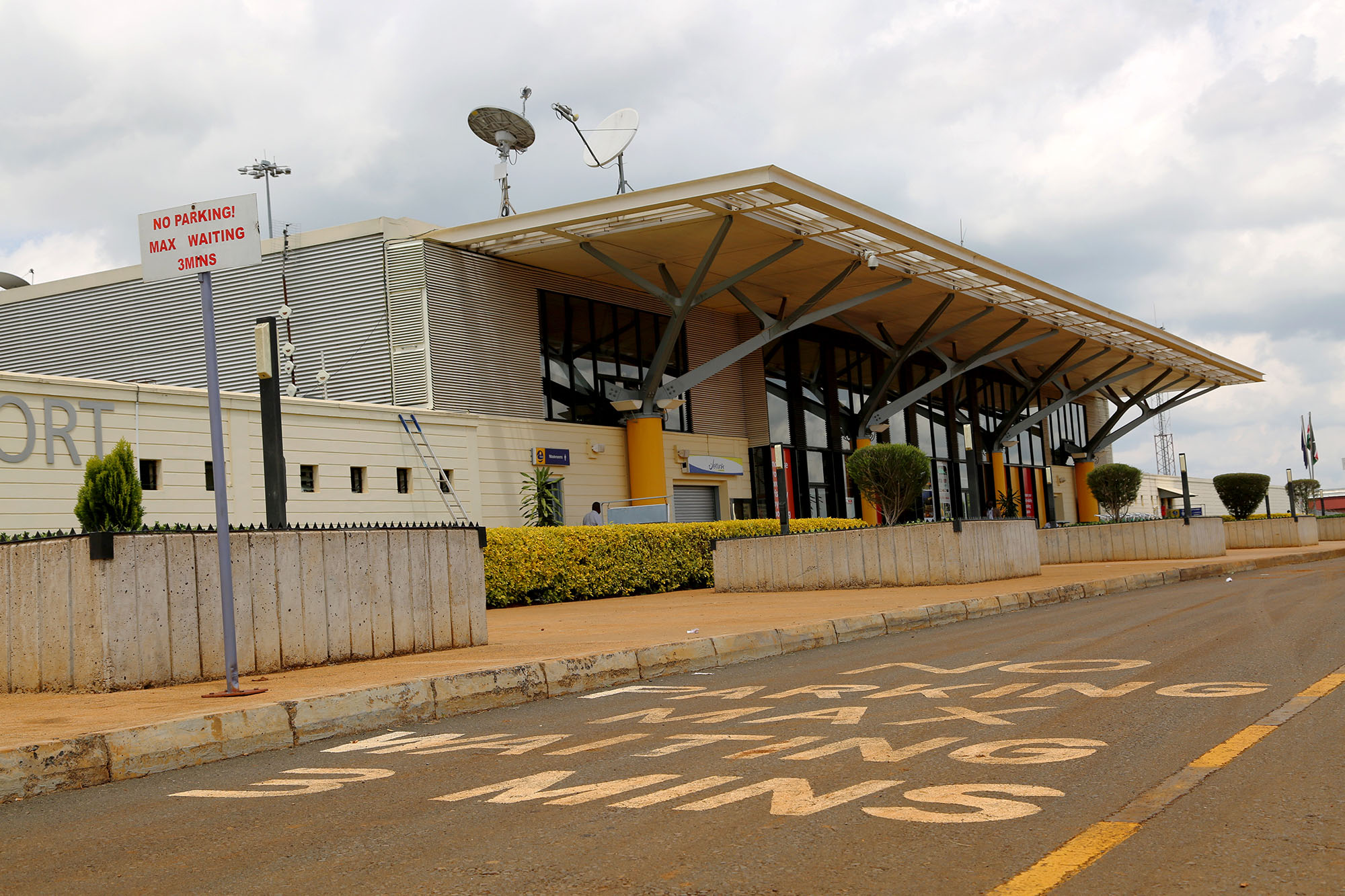
- IATA: EDL; ICAO: HKEL

Summary
- Airport type: Public, Civilian
- Owner: Kenya Airports Authority
- Serves: Eldoret
- Location: Eldoret, Kenya
- Elevation AMSL: 7,050 ft / 2,150 m
- Coordinates: 00°24′16″N 35°14′20″E

Map
- Location of Eldoret Airport in Kenya; Placement on map is approximate

Runways
Direction	Length		Surface
Direction	ft	m	Surface
08/26	11,400	3,475	Asphalt

Statistics (2013)
- Passenger numbers: 111,250

Eldoret International Airport is located in Uasin Gishu County, near Eldoret city in western Kenya. It serves as both a domestic and international airport, supporting passenger flights and significant cargo operations, especially for agricultural exports. The airport features a long paved runway and a modern terminal, and is one of Kenya's designated international ports of entry. Its strategic location makes it important for regional connectivity and economic activity in the Rift Valley.

== Location ==
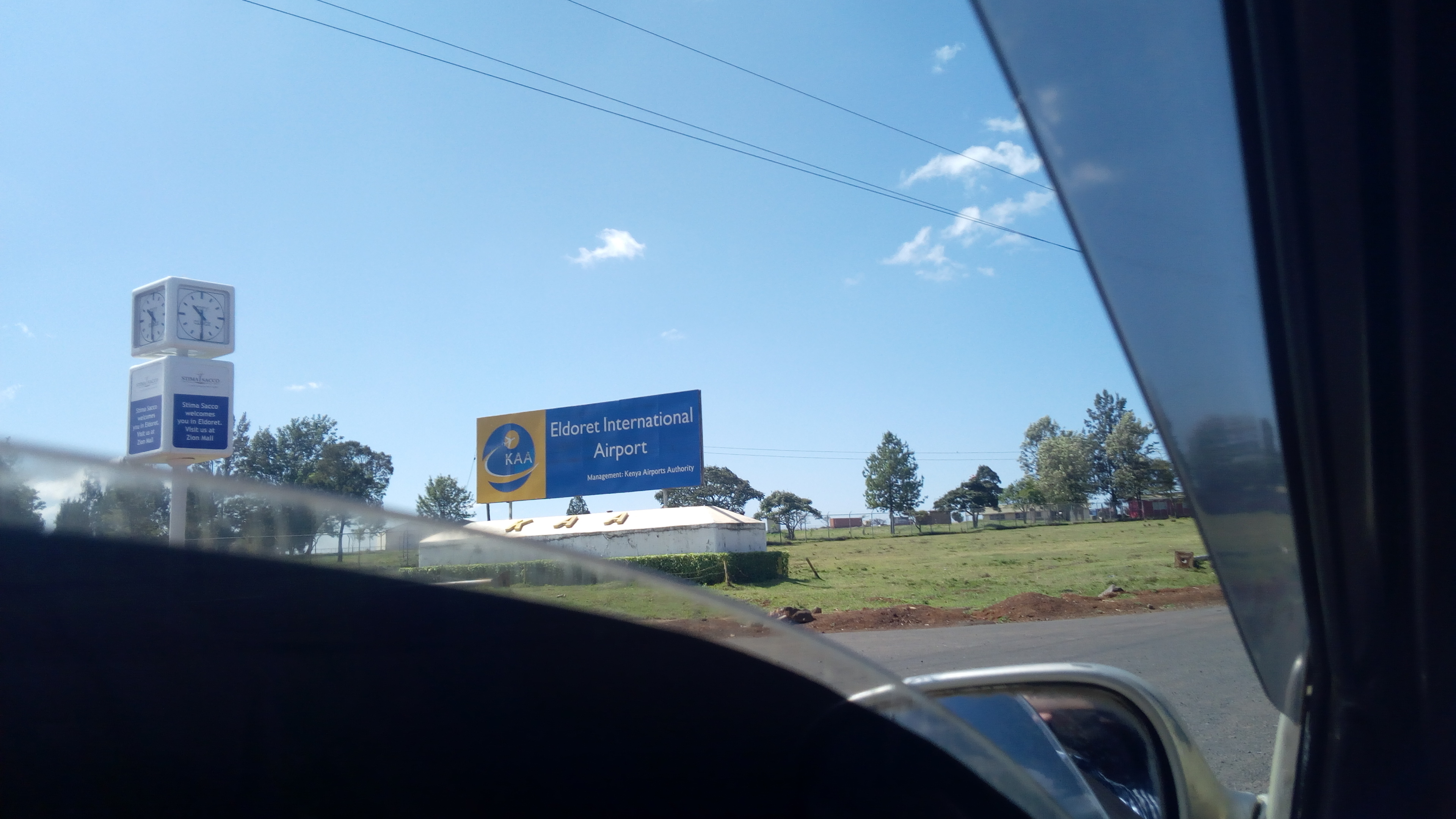
Sign to Eldoret International Airport along the Eldoret-Kisumu Road

Eldoret Airport, (IATA: EDL, ICAO: HKEL), is located in the city of Eldoret, in Uasin Gishu County, in midwestern Kenya, close to the international border with Uganda. Its location is approximately 17 kilometres (11 mi), by road, south of the central business district of Eldoret in Kapseret Ward. This location lies approximately 269 kilometres (167 mi), by air, northwest of Jomo Kenyatta International Airport, the largest civilian and military airport in the country.

== Overview ==
Eldoret International Airport is a large airport that serves the city of Eldoret and the surrounding communities. Situated at 2,150 metres (7,050 ft) above sea level, the airport has a single asphalt runway that measures 3,475 metres (11,401 ft) in length. The airport has immigration and customs facilities and is open for international operations daily from 06:00 to 18:30 local time. Operations can be extended upon request.

== History ==
The airport was established in 1995. It is administered by the Kenya Airports Authority. Currently, the airport has two scheduled international cargo flights and several ad hoc freighters per week. The airport is open from Monday to Sunday from 03.30 hours to 17.30 hours GMT, but the hours can be extended on request. Currently, the airport has three scheduled international cargo flights and several ad hoc freighters per week.

Eldoret International Airport was built with the vision of achieving accelerated economic growth, through integration and opening up of the Western region to local and international markets. The airport is also expected to promote the exploitation of the rich tourism circuit of Western Kenya, which is largely unexploited.

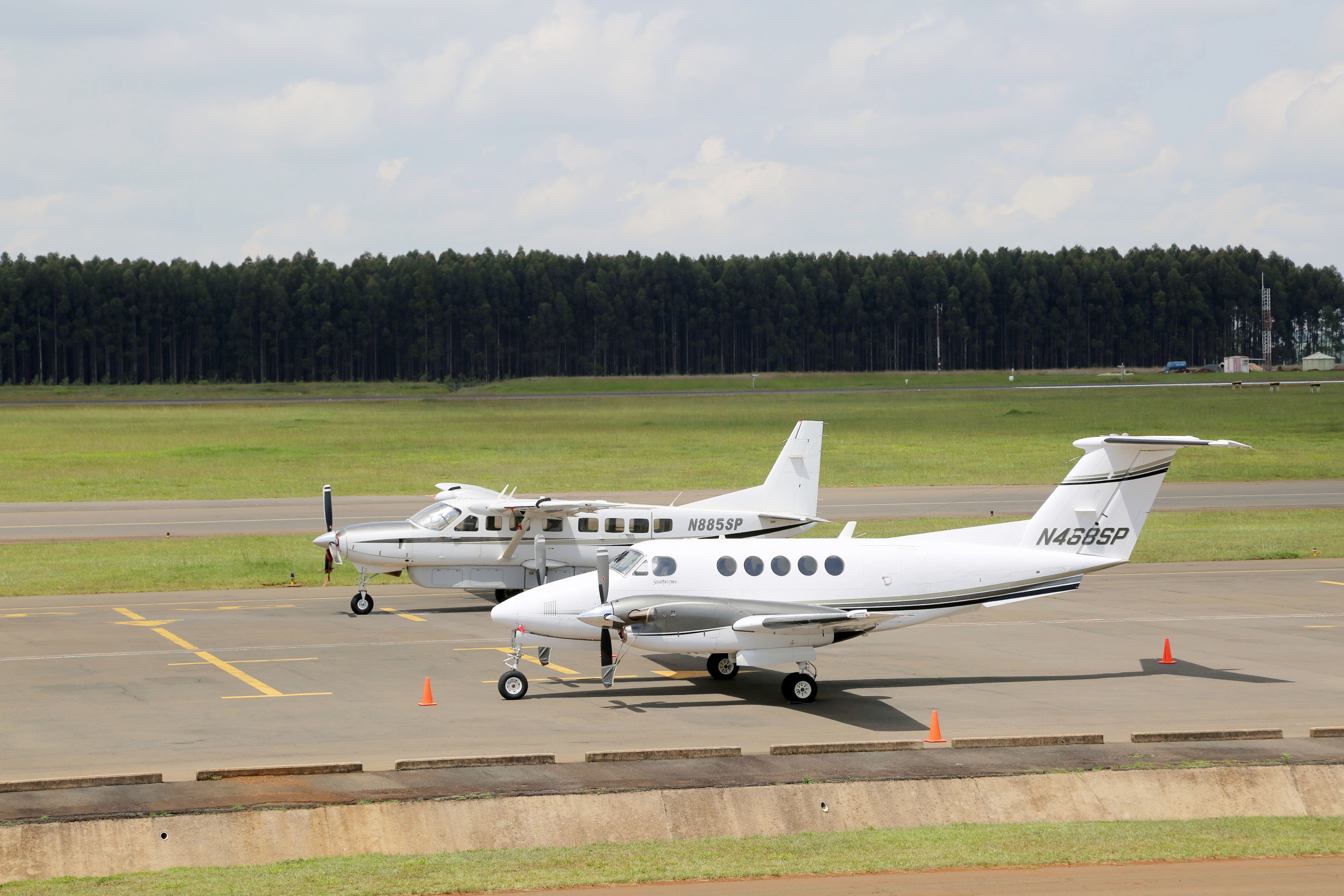
Two planes on the runway of Eldoret International Airport.

== Airlines and destinations ==
=== Passenger ===
Airlines	Destinations
Jambojet	Mombasa, Nairobi–Jomo Kenyatta
Skyward Express	Lodwar, Nairobi–Wilson

=== Cargo ===
Airlines	Destinations
Astral Aviation	Nairobi–Jomo Kenyatta, Sharjah
Kenya Airways Cargo	Sharjah
Ethiopian Airlines	Nairobi–Jomo Kenyatta, Sharjah

== Passenger numbers ==
Year	Passenger numbers
2011	86,351 ▲
2012	91,399 ▲
2013	111,250 ▲

== See also ==
- Eldoret
- Uasin Gishu County
- List of airports in Kenya
