= Jambojet =

Low-cost airline of Kenya

IATA	ICAO	Call sign
JM	JMA	CHUI
- Founded: 13 September 2013; 13 years ago
- Commenced operations: 1 April 2014; 12 years ago
- Hubs: Jomo Kenyatta International Airport
- Secondary hubs: Moi International Airport
- Fleet size: 11
- Destinations: 8
- Parent company: Kenya Airways
- Headquarters: Nairobi, Kenya
- Key people: Vincent Rague (Chairman); Karanja Ndegwa (CEO)
- Total equity: KSh.100,000/=
- Employees: 213 (2019)
- Website: www.jambojet.com

Jambojet Limited is a Kenyan low-cost airline that started operations on 1 April 2014. It is a subsidiary of Kenya Airways and is headquartered in Nairobi, Kenya.

== History ==
Willem Alexander Hondius was appointed as CEO in September 2013, reporting to the board of directors, chaired by Ayisi Makatiani. Before his appointment, Hondius was general manager for KLM Royal Dutch Airlines for Eastern Africa based in Nairobi since 2012. The airline aimed to directly employ 24 employees, hire 20 pilots from Kenya Airways, and source 30 crew members from third parties.

Operations commenced on 1 April 2014. The Kenya Civil Aviation Authority authorised the airline to fly to Burundi, Comoros, the Democratic Republic of the Congo, Ethiopia, Madagascar, Mayotte, Rwanda, Somalia, South Sudan, Tanzania, and Uganda.

== Corporate affairs ==
=== Ownership ===
The airline is a wholly owned subsidiary of Kenya Airways. Its equity consists of 5,000 shares each with a nominal value of KSh 20/=.

=== Business trends ===
Jambojet's performance and financial figures are fully incorporated within the Kenya Airways Group report and accounts.

Available figures for Jambojet are shown below - until March 2017, accounting dates were for the year ending 31 March; this changed to year ending 31 December from 2017, to align with accounting dates for the parent company. (Note also: Jambojet commenced operations in April 2014; therefore start-up costs, but no income, arose in the financial year to March 2014.)

	2014	2015	2016	Mar 2017 (12m)	Dec 2017 (9m)	2018
Turnover (KSh. billion/=)	0	2.61	3.44	3.75	2.64	4.99
Profit (EBT) (KSh. million/=)	−118	−287	126	−25	−101	77
Number of employees	n/a	29	35	54	85	
Number of passengers (millions)	0	0.48	0.57	0.59	0.43	
Passenger load factor (%)	0	92				
Number of aircraft (at year end)	2	4	4	4	5	5
Notes/sources						

== Destinations ==
As of January 2024, Jambojet flies to seven airports within Kenya as well as one international destination. Jambojet suspended operations into Entebbe and Kigali in August 2020 due to the COVID-19 pandemic. Jambojet is currently the largest domestic carrier in Kenya, carrying over 1 million passengers in 2022 and projecting to carry at least 1.2 million passengers in 2023.

Country	City	Airport	Notes	Refs
DR Congo	Goma	Goma International Airport	Suspended	
Kenya	Eldoret	Eldoret International Airport		
Kenya	Kisumu	Kisumu International Airport		
Kenya	Lamu	Manda Airport		
Kenya	Malindi	Malindi Airport		
Kenya	Mombasa	Moi International Airport	Secondary hub	
Kenya	Nairobi	Jomo Kenyatta International Airport	Primary hub	
Kenya	Ukunda	Ukunda Airport		
Rwanda	Kigali	Kigali International Airport	Suspended	
Somalia	Mogadishu	Aden Adde International Airport	Terminated	
Tanzania	Zanzibar City	Abeid Amani Karume International Airport		
Uganda	Entebbe	Entebbe International Airport		

== Fleet ==
=== Current fleet ===
As of July 2026, Jambojet operates the following aircraft:

Jambojet fleet
Aircraft	In service	Orders	Passengers	Notes
De Havilland Canada Dash 8-Q400	11	—	78	
De Havilland Canada Dash 8-Q400	11	—	82	
Total	11	—		

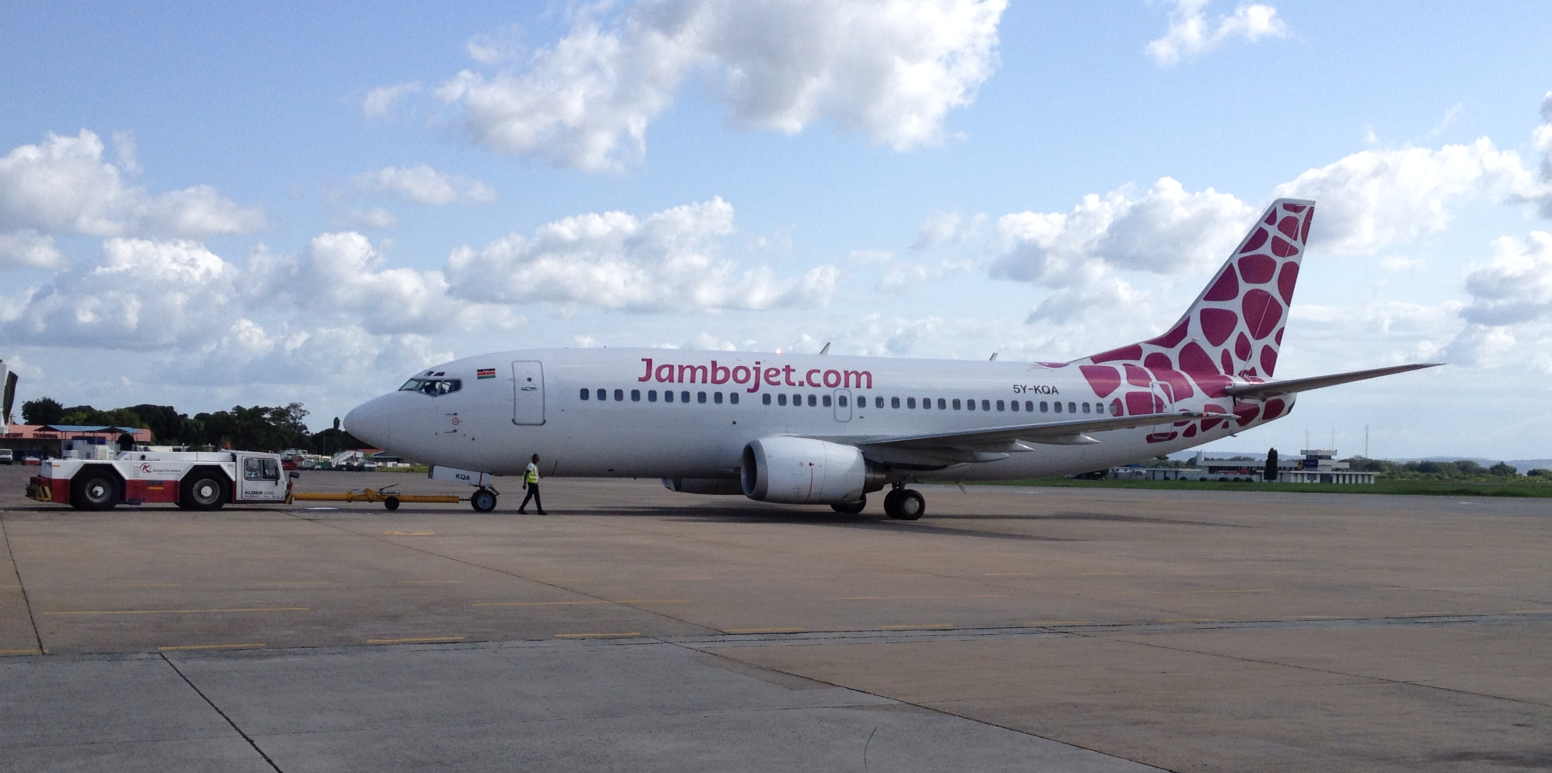
A former Jambojet Boeing 737-300 at Moi International Airport in 2014

=== Former fleet ===
As of August 2025, Jambojet operated 8 De Havilland Canada Dash 8-Q400.

The company has also previously operated the following aircraft:

- Boeing 737-300

== See also ==
- Transport in Kenya
- Jubba Airways
