= Manda Airport =

Airport in Kenya

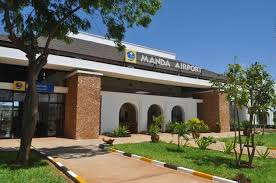
- IATA: LAU; ICAO: HKLU

Summary
- Airport type: Public, civilian
- Owner: Government of Kenya
- Operator: Kenya Airports Authority
- Serves: Lamu
- Location: Manda Island, Lamu Archipelago, Kenya
- Elevation AMSL: 20 ft / 6 m
- Coordinates: 02°14′46″S 40°54′36″E

Map
- Location of Manda Airport in Kenya; Placement on map is approximate.

Runways
Direction	Length		Surface
Direction	ft	m	Surface
16/34	6,330	1,930	Asphalt
08/26	3,054	931	Dirt/grass

Manda Airport (IATA: LAU, ICAO: HKLU), also called Lamu Airport, is an airport in Kenya. Manda Airport is a small domestic airport located on Manda Island, serving the Lamu Archipelago in Kenya's coastal region. It provides air access to Lamu Town, a UNESCO World Heritage Site, as well as nearby islands like Shela and Manda. The airport has a single runway and basic facilities, mainly handling domestic flights from Nairobi, Mombasa, and Malindi. Access to Lamu Island from the airport is via a short boat ride.

== Location ==
Manda Airport is located on Manda Island in the Lamu Archipelago of Lamu County on the western shore of the Indian Ocean, on the Kenyan coast.

Its location is approximately 450 kilometres (280 mi), by air, southeast of Nairobi International Airport, the country's largest civilian airport. The geographic coordinates of this airport are 2° 14' 46.00"S, 40° 54' 36.00"E (Latitude: -2.246110; Longitude: 40.910000).

== Overview ==
Manda Airport is a small civilian airport on Manda Island, serving the Lamu Archipelago in Kenya. Situated at 6 metres (20 ft) above sea level, the airport has two runways. The first runway (15/33) is paved with asphalt and measures 6,330 feet (1,930 m) in length and 100 feet (30 m) in width. The second runway (08/26) is unpaved and is 3,054 feet (931 m) long and 46 feet (14 m) wide.

== Airlines and destinations ==
Airlines	Destinations
Jambojet	Nairobi–Jomo Kenyatta
Safarilink	Kiwayu, Nairobi–Wilson
Skyward Express	Mombasa, Nairobi–Wilson

== Accidents and incidents ==
On 14 October 2003 at about 9.00 am local time, a Cessna 208 Caravan I owned and operated by Airkenya Express, with one pilot and no passengers, took off from Wilson Airport in Nairobi, headed for Manda Airport in Lamu, approximately 450 kilometres (280 mi), by air, to the southeast. Soon after becoming airborne, the aircraft lost height, crash-landed in Nairobi National Park and overturned. The pilot sustained minor injuries. The aircraft was written off.

The airport is near the Camp Simba US naval base. Al-Shabaab militants attacked the base in January 2020. The airport was temporarily closed.

== See also ==
- Kenya Airports Authority
- Kenya Civil Aviation Authority
- List of airports in Kenya
