= Wilson Airport =

Airport in Nairobi, Kenya

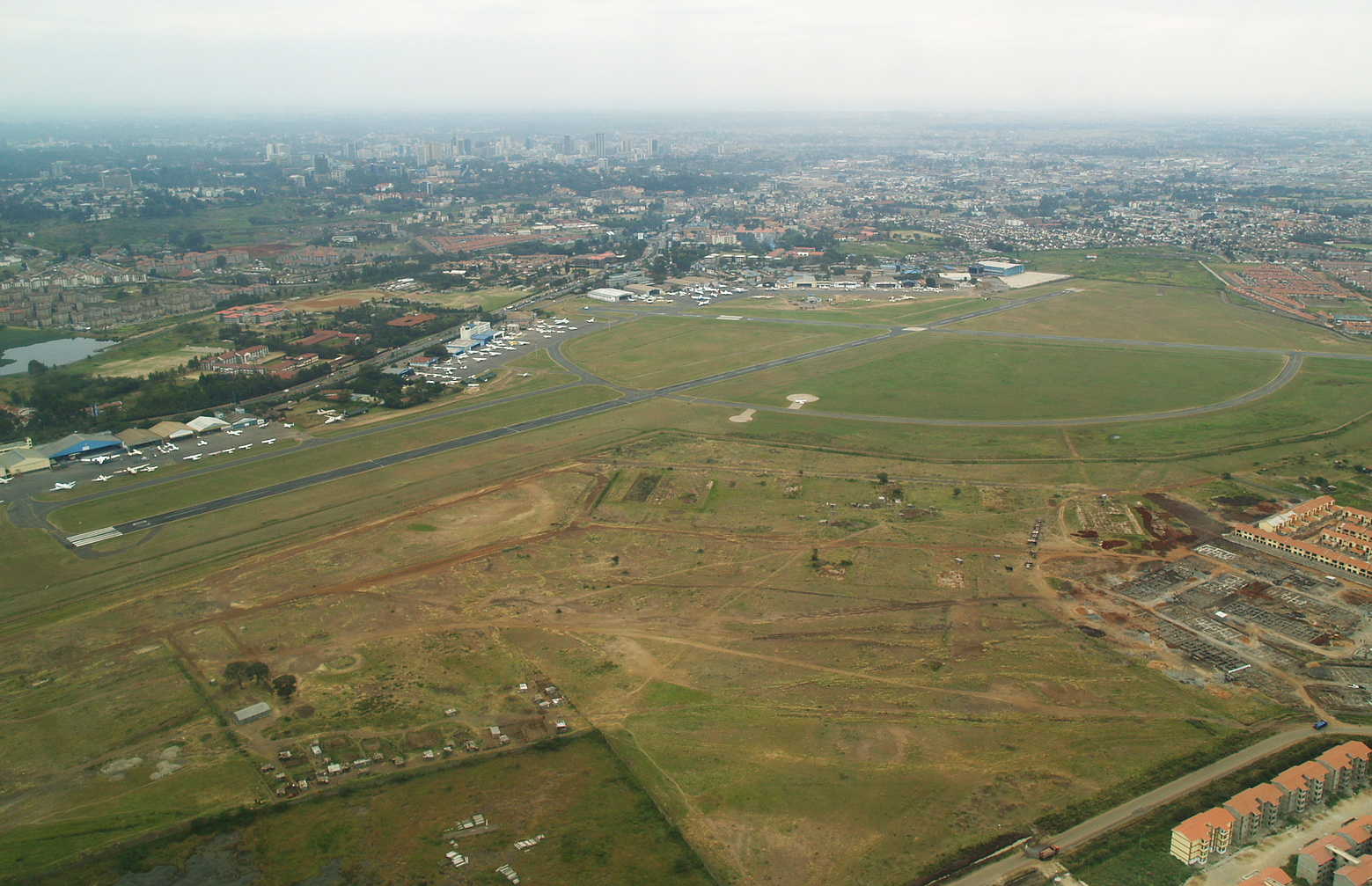
- Aerial view of Wilson Airport
- IATA: WIL; ICAO: HKNW

Summary
- Airport type: Public
- Owner: Kenya Airports Authority
- Serves: Nairobi
- Location: Lang'ata, Nairobi, Kenya
- Opened: 1929; 97 years ago
- Hub for: Aircraft Leasing Services; Airkenya Express; Renegade Air; Safarilink
- Focus city for: Mombasa Air Safari
- Elevation AMSL: 1,690 m / 5,546 ft
- Coordinates: 01°19′12″S 36°48′54″E

Map
- Location of Wilson Airport in Kenya; Placement on map is approximate

Runways
Direction	Length		Surface
Direction	m	ft	Surface
07/25	1,463	4,798	Asphalt
14/32	1,560	5,052	Asphalt

Statistics (2017)
- Passenger numbers: 528,000

Wilson Airport (IATA: WIL, ICAO: HKNW) is an airport in Nairobi, Kenya. It has flights to many regional airports in Kenya while Nairobi's main airport, Jomo Kenyatta International Airport, serves domestic and many international destinations.

The airport serves domestic flights to Kenyan cities, and an international flight to Tanzania.

== Location ==
Wilson Airport is in Nairobi County, in the city of Nairobi, the capital of Kenya and the largest metropolitan centre in that country. It lies approximately 4 kilometres (2.5 mi) by road south of the central business district. Nearby suburbs include Langata, South C, and Kibera.

This location is approximately 18 kilometres (11 mi) by road west of Jomo Kenyatta International Airport, the largest civilian airport in the country.

== Overview ==
The airport serves domestic and international traffic. It is used mostly by general aviation traffic. Industries that use Wilson Airport extensively include tourism, health care and agriculture. Wilson Airport averages traffic of around 120,000 landings and take-offs annually.

Airkenya and other small airlines use Wilson Airport for scheduled domestic passenger services, instead of Jomo Kenyatta International Airport. Missionary aviation operators AMREF, Mission Aviation Fellowship (MAF) and AIM AIR use Wilson Airport as their airport base on the African continent. It is used also for flight training. The airport is under the supervision of Kenya Airports Authority (KAA).

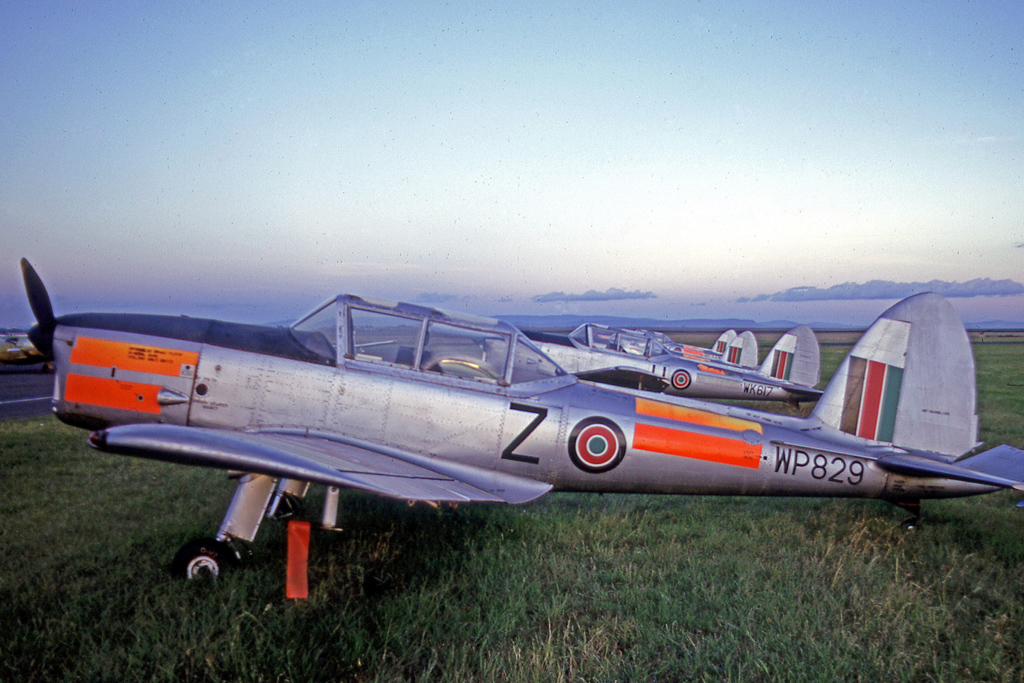
De Havilland Chipmunk trainers of the Kenya Air Force at Wilson Aerodrome in April 1973

As a result of faster check-in times and fewer flight delays, as compared to Jomo Kenyatta International Airport, Wilson Airport is commonly used by business executive aircraft for domestic and international travel. Common domestic destinations from Wilson Airport include Kisumu Airport, Mombasa International Airport and Eldoret International Airport.

At 5,546 feet (1,690 m) above sea level, Wilson Airport has two asphalt runways: Runway 1 (heading 07/25) measures 4,798 feet (1,462 m) long and 72 feet (22 m) wide; Runway 2 (heading 14/32) measures 5,052 feet (1,540 m) long and 76 feet (23 m) wide.

== History ==
The airport was established as Nairobi West Aerodrome in 1929 by Florence Kerr Wilson, a wealthy widow, whose airline Wilson Airways was based there. Built at a cost of £50,000 (£3.2 million in 2020), Mrs Wilson hired pilot Tom Campbell Black to run the airport. After the outbreak of World War II in 1939, the airport, its aircraft fleet and its pilots were taken over by the then colonial government and made a Fleet Air Arm base until after the war when it continued functioning as a civilian airport. In 1962, it was named Wilson Airport in honour of its founder who died in 1968.

== Airlines and destinations ==
Airlines	Destinations
Airkenya Express	Amboseli, Kilimanjaro, Lamu, Lewa Downs, Maasai Mara, Malindi, Meru, Nanyuki, Samburu, Ukunda/Diani Beach
Flightlink	Arusha
Mombasa Air Safari	Amboseli, Maasai Mara
Renegade Air	Homa Bay, Kisumu, Wajir
Safarilink	Amboseli, Entebbe Kilaguni, Kilimanjaro, Kiwayu, Kisumu, Lamu, Lewa Downs, Maasai Mara, Mombasa, Naivasha, Nanyuki, Samburu, Ukunda/Diani Beach, Zanzibar
Skyward Airlines	Eldoret, Kakamega, Kitale, Lamu, Lodwar, Malindi, Mombasa, Ukunda/Diani Beach, Vipingo

== Accidents and incidents ==
- On 24 December 1968, a Douglas C-47A 5Y-ADI of the Kenya Police Air Wing crashed shortly after takeoff. The incident was attributed to inadequately secured cargo. All three people on board were killed.
- On 11 October 2019, a Silverstone Air Services Fokker 50 registration 5Y-IZO operating flight 620 to Mombasa, Kenya, overran the runway on takeoff from Wilson. The aircraft was extensively damaged but there were no fatalities.
- On 5 March 2024, a Safarilink Aviation de Havilland Dash 8-300, registration 5Y-SLK, shortly after takeoff from Wilson collided with a Cessna 172, registration 5Y-NNJ, operated by a local flying school. The Cessna crashed and the two occupants were killed. The Dash 8 had minor damage and landed back at Wilson with no casualties.

== See also ==
- Kenya Airports Authority
- Kenya Civil Aviation Authority
- List of airports in Kenya
