= Airkenya Express =

Kenyan airline

IATA	ICAO	Call sign
P2	XAK	SUNEXPRESS
- Founded: 1987
- Hubs: Wilson Airport
- Subsidiaries: Aerolink Uganda, Regional Air
- Fleet size: 9
- Destinations: 12 (area only total, particulars not included)
- Parent company: Air Kenya Express Limited
- Headquarters: Nairobi, Kenya
- Website: airkenya.com

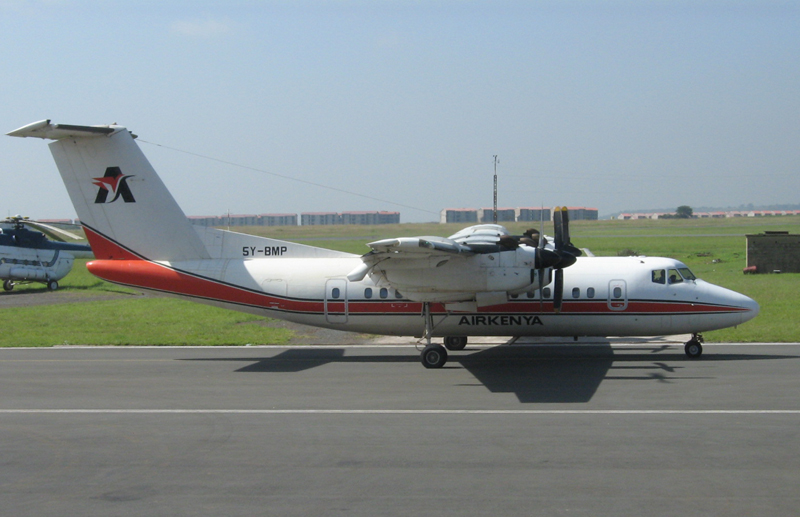
Airkenya Dash 7

Airkenya Express is an airline based in Nairobi, Kenya. It operates domestic scheduled and charter services, as well as scheduled flights to Tanzania. Its main base is Wilson Airport, Nairobi.

== History ==
Air Kenya 1990 Logo

Airkenya Express was formed and started operations in 1987 from the merger of Air Kenya and Sunbird Aviation. The two companies had over 20 years of general aviation experience in East Africa. Airkenya Aviation became Airkenya Express in January 2007. The airline is wholly owned by a Kenyan-controlled consortium and has 165 employees. It carried 100,000 passengers in 2014, as against 120,000 in 2013.

AirKenya has two wholly owned subsidiaries: Regional Air Services in Tanzania launched in 1997 and AeroLink in Uganda launched in 2012.

== Services ==
Airkenya Express Limited operates to the following airports (as of July 2021):

Domestic scheduled destinations:

- Amboseli (Amboseli Airport)
- Lewa Downs (Lewa Airport)
- Maasai Mara (Keekorok, Kichwa, Musiara, Ngerende, Olekiombo, Serena, Shikar and Siana airstrips.)
- Meru (Mulika Lodge Airport)
- Nairobi-Wilson
- Nanyuki (Nanyuki Airport)
- Samburu (Samburu Airport)

International scheduled destinations:

- Kilimanjaro, Tanzania (Kilimanjaro International Airport)

== Accidents and incidents ==
- In February 1992, Douglas DC-3C 5Y-BBN was written off at an airstrip in the Maasai Mara. The aircraft was scrapped in situ in 1993.

== Fleet ==
The Airkenya fleet consists of the following aircraft (as of August 2017):

Airkenya fleet
Aircraft	In service	Orders	Passengers	Notes
De Havilland Canada DHC-8-200	3 (as of July 2026)	—	37	
Cessna Grand Caravan C208B	3	—	11	
De Havilland Canada DHC-6-300 Twin Otter	2(as of July 2026)	—	18	
De Havilland Canada Dash 7-100	2(as of July 2026)	—	50	
Total	10			
