= Safarilink Aviation =

Kenyan airline

IATA	ICAO	Call sign
F2	XLK	SAFARILINK
- Founded: 2004
- Hubs: Wilson Airport
- Frequent-flyer program: Safari Bonus
- Fleet size: 15
- Destinations: 18
- Headquarters: Nairobi, Kenya
- Key people: Mbuvi Ngunze; Non-Executive Chairman
- Employees: 250+
- Website: flysafarilink.com

Safarilink Aviation Limited (operating as Safarilink) (IATA: F2, ICAO: XLK) is a regional airline based at Wilson Airport in Nairobi, Kenya.

== Fleet ==
=== Current fleet ===
The Safarilink Aviation fleet consists of the following aircraft (as of November 2026):

Safarilink Aviation fleet
Aircraft	In service	Orders	Passengers	Notes
Cessna 208B Caravan	11	—	12	(as of November 2026)
De Havilland Canada Dash 8-100 Subvariant -106, Registration 5Y-SLD	1	—	37	(as of November 2026)
De Havilland Canada Dash 8-Q200 Subvariant -202, Registration 5Y-SLO	1	—	37	(as of November 2026)
De Havilland Canada Dash 8-Q300 Subvariants -311 (5Y-SLC) and -315 (5Y-SLK)	2	—	50	(as of November 2026)
De Havilland Canada Dash 8-Q300 Subvariants -311 (5Y-SLC) and -315 (5Y-SLK)	2	—	52	(as of November 2026)
Total	15	—		

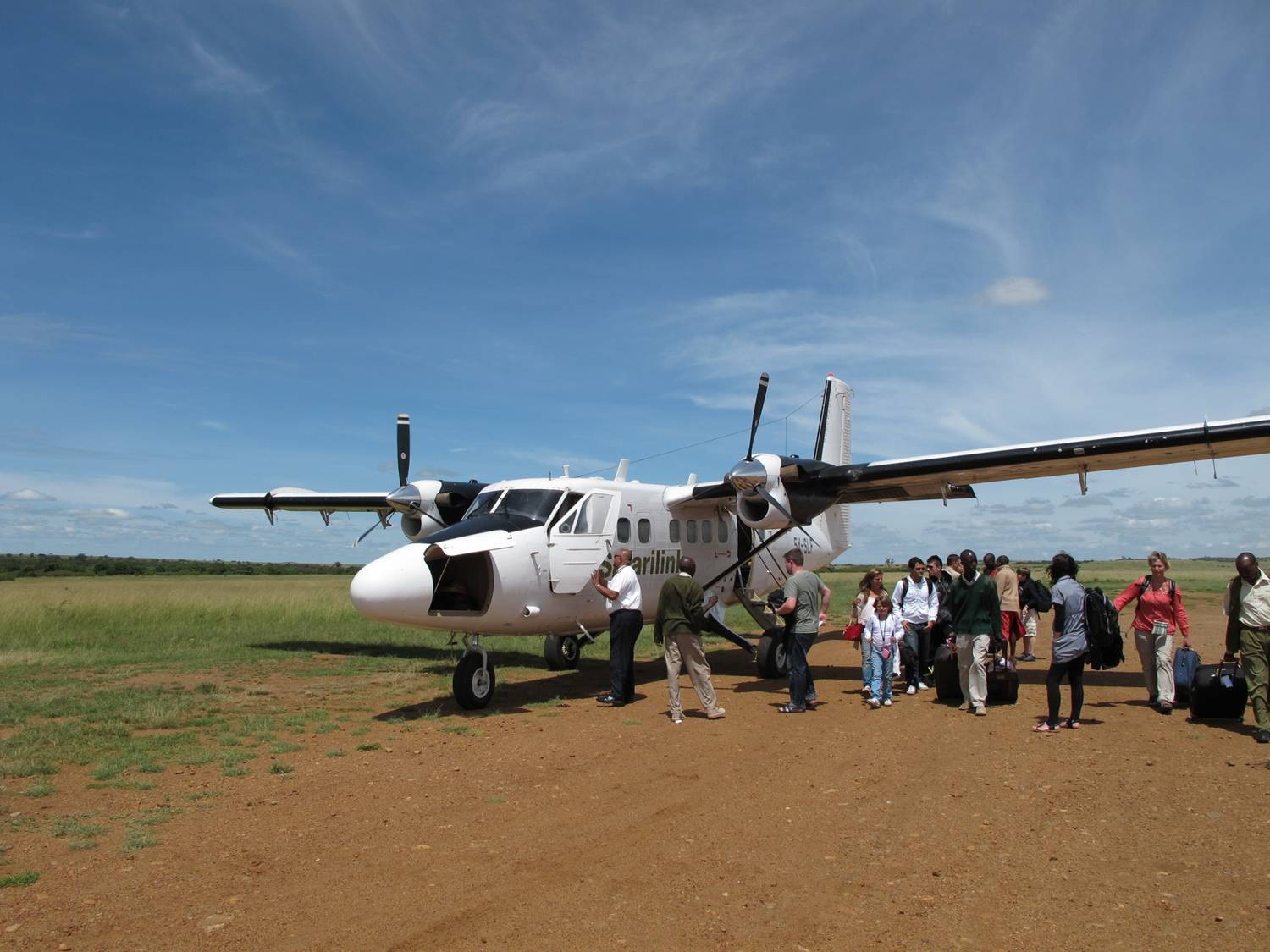
Safarilink Twin Otter at Mara-Olkiombo airstrip in April 2010

=== Historical fleet ===
The airline's fleet previously also included the following aircraft type:

- De Havilland Twin Otter

== Destinations ==
As of August 2019, the airline serviced the following destinations, among others.

Country	City	Airport	Notes	Refs
Kenya	Amboseli	Amboseli Airport	—	
Kenya	Diani Beach	Ukunda Airport	—	
Tanzania	Kilimanjaro	Kilimanjaro International Airport	—	
Tanzania	Zanzibar	Zanzibar International Airport	—	
Kenya	Kitale	Kitale Airport	—	
Kenya	Lamu	Manda Airport	—	
Kenya	Lewa Downs	Lewa Airport	—	
Kenya	Lodwar	Lodwar Airport	—	
Kenya	Loisaba	Loisaba Airstrip	—	
Kenya	Masai Mara	Mara Serena Airport	—	
Kenya	Mombasa	Moi International Airport	—	
Kenya	Nairobi	Wilson Airport	Hub	
Kenya	Naivasha	Naivasha Airport	—	
Kenya	Nanyuki	Nanyuki Airport	—	
Kenya	Samburu	Samburu Airport	—	
Kenya	Shaba	Shaba Airstrip	—	
Kenya	Tsavo West National Park	Mtito Andei Airport	—	
Kenya	Vipingo Ridge	Vipingo Ridge Airstrip	—	

== Associations and memberships ==
In September 2019, Safarilink Aviation became a member of the African Airlines Association (AFRAA).

== Accidents and incidents ==
- On 5 March 2024, Safarilink Aviation Flight 053, a Dash 8-315 registered as 5Y-SLK on a scheduled flight to Ukunda Airport, collided on climbout from Wilson Airport with a Cessna 172M on a local training flight. Flight 053 returned to Wilson Airport and landed safely with no injuries to the 39 passengers and five crew, while the Cessna crashed in nearby Nairobi National Park, killing the two pilots on board. As of July 2024, the accident is under investigation.
