= Mombasa Air Safari =

Kenyan airline

IATA	ICAO	Call sign
–	RRV	SKYROVER
- Founded: 1970; 56 years ago (as Rapid Air); 1974; 52 years ago (renamed Mombasa Air Services); 1985; 41 years ago (renamed Mombasa Air Safari)
- Fleet size: 9
- Destinations: 13
- Headquarters: Mombasa International Airport
- Website: www.mombasaairsafari.com

Mombasa Air Safari (known as MAS) is a Kenyan scheduled airline.

== History ==
Originally started in 1970 as Rapid Air, the company was purchased in 1974 and renamed Mombasa Air Services. Based in Mombasa MAS has, since that date, always served the coast tourism industry. An additional MAS company, Malindi Air Services, was created with the purchase of Sunbird Aviation (Malindi) in 1977. A further company, Mombasa Air Services (Ukunda) Limited was added the same year with the purchase of Amphibians Ltd, based at Diani Beach at Ukunda airfield. The three companies were known as the M.A.S. group, and a fourth organisation, Mombasa Air School, was added to the group as an ab-initio pilot training school in 1978.

To inject capital and provide growth, the MAS group of companies was sold in 1982 to CMC Aviation, owned by Cooper Motor Corporation, a publicly traded company, based in Nairobi. The MAS identity was changed to Cooper Skybird. In 1986 there was a further change of ownership to another publicly traded group, and the airline was named Prestige Air, and all its operations were transferred to Nairobi. The company eventually wound down and ceased flight operations.

In 1985 the original owners brought back the MAS name with a new aviation company under a new AOC that became known as Mombasa Air Safari. MAS operates along the Kenya coast with hubs at Mombasa ( Moi Airport) and Diani Beach (Ukunda Airfield) with regular departures also from Malindi.

The airline colours are dark blue, light blue and gold and in 2004 the logo was changed to a lion's paw, which is featured on all MAS aircraft tail fins. The MAS Air Operator Certificate Number 016 provides for air charter and also scheduled services for both PAX and CARGO operation. In 2008 the Kenya Ministry of Transport granted MAS the status of a designated carrier for services to Tanzania.

In 1995 the owners/directors of MAS created a separate maintenance company, Benair Engineering Limited, that holds an Authorised Maintenance Certificate (AMO), based at Mombasa's Moi International Airport, to service the MAS fleet and undertake third-party maintenance for other airlines such as Blue Sky Aviation Services. Benair is an authorised LET Service Centre.

== Destinations ==
In 2018, Mombasa Air Safari flew to the following locations:

- Amboseli
- Diani Beach
- Island of Lamu
- Malindi
- Masai Mara
- Meru National Park
- Mombasa International Airport
- Samburu
- Tsavo
- Nairobi Wilson Airport
- Zanzibar
- Juba
- Pemba

== Fleet ==
As of July 2026, Mombasa Air Safari operates the following aircraft:

Aircraft	In service	Orders	Notes
De Havilland Canada DHC-8-100	1	—	
Total	1	—	

Mombasa Air Safari operates eight Cessna 208 Grand Caravan aircraft.

== Accidents and incidents ==
In 1998 aircraft with registration number 5Y-MAS, a 19-seat Let L-410 Turbolet crashed immediately after takeoff from Ol Kiombo Airstrip in the Masai Mara. No passengers were on board. Both pilots died. The accident report found no technical problem and cited possible pilot error with the flap settings.

Two pilots and two passengers died on Wednesday 22 August 2012, after a 19-seat Let L-410UVP-E9, registration number 5Y-UVP, with 13 people on board, including 2 crew, crashed at an airstrip in the Maasai Mara Game Reserve. Six passengers on board the aircraft, belonging to Mombasa Air Safari, were seriously injured as the pilots took off from Ngerende Airstrip near the Mara Safari Club.

On October 28, 2025, Mombasa Air Safari Flight 203 operated by a Cessna 208 Caravan, registered as 5Y-CCA, crashed near Kwale, Kenya. The aircraft carried one pilot and ten foreign tourists, from Hungary and Germany, who were all killed in the crash.
