= List of airports in South Sudan =

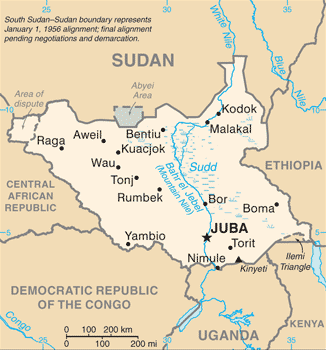
Map of South Sudan

The 10 states of South Sudan, grouped in the three historical provinces of the Sudan. Bahr el Ghazal Equatoria Greater Upper Nile

This is a list of airports in South Sudan, sorted by location.

South Sudan, officially the Republic of South Sudan, is a landlocked country in east-central Africa bordered by Ethiopia to the east, Kenya to the southeast, Uganda to the south, the Democratic Republic of the Congo to the southwest, the Central African Republic to the west, and Sudan to the north. South Sudan's capital and largest city is Juba. The country is divided into 10 states.

== Airports ==
Airport names shown in bold indicate the airport has scheduled service on commercial airlines.

| City served | State | ICAO | IATA | Airport name |
|---|---|---|---|---|
**Public airports**
| Adareil | Eastern Nile | | AEE | Adareil Airstrip |
| Akobo | Eastern Bieh | HSAK | | Akobo Airport |
| Aweil (Uwayl) | Aweil State | HSAW | | **Aweil Airport** |
| Bentiu | Northern Liech | HSBT | | Bentiu Airport |
| Bor | Unity State | HSBR | | Bor Airport |
| Duar | Jonglei State | | | Thar Jath Airstrip |
| Gogrial (Qaqriyal) | Gogrial State | HSGO | | Gogrial Airport |
| Juba | Central Equatoria State | HJJJ | JUB | **Juba International Airport *** |
| Kajo Keji | Central Equatoria State | HSKJ | | Kajo Keji Airstrip |
| Kapoeta | Namorunyang | HSKP | | Kapoeta Airport |
| Malakal | Upper Nile State | HSSM | MAK | **Malakal Airport *** |
| Maridi | Maridi State | HSMD | | Maridi Airport |
| Nimule | Imatong State | HSNM | | Nimule Airport |
| Paloich | Upper Nile State | HSFA | | **Paloich Airport** |
| Pochalla | Upper Nile State | HSPA | | Pochalla Airport |
| Pibor | Boma State | HSPI | | Pibor Airport |
| Raga | Lol State | HSRJ | | Raga Airport |
| Renk | Upper Nile State | HSRN | | Renk Airport |
| Rumbek | Western Lakes | HSMK | RBX | **Rumbek Airport** |
| Tonj (Tong) | Tonj State | HSTO | | Tonj Airport |
| Torit | Imatong State | HSTR | | Torit Airport |
| Tumbura | Gbudwe | HSTU | | Tumbura Airport |
| Wau | Wau State | HSWW | WUU | **Wau Airport** |
| Yambio | Gbudwe | HSYA | | Yambio Airport |
| Yei | Yei River State | HSYE | | **Yei Airport** |
| Yirol | Eastern Lakes | HSYL | | Yirol Airport |

* - International airports

== See also ==
- Transport in South Sudan
- List of airports by ICAO code: H#HS - Sudan and South Sudan
- List of airports in Sudan
- Wikipedia:WikiProject Aviation/Airline destination lists: Africa#Sudan
