= Golden Wings Aviation =

South Sudanese airline

Golden Wings Aviation South Sudan

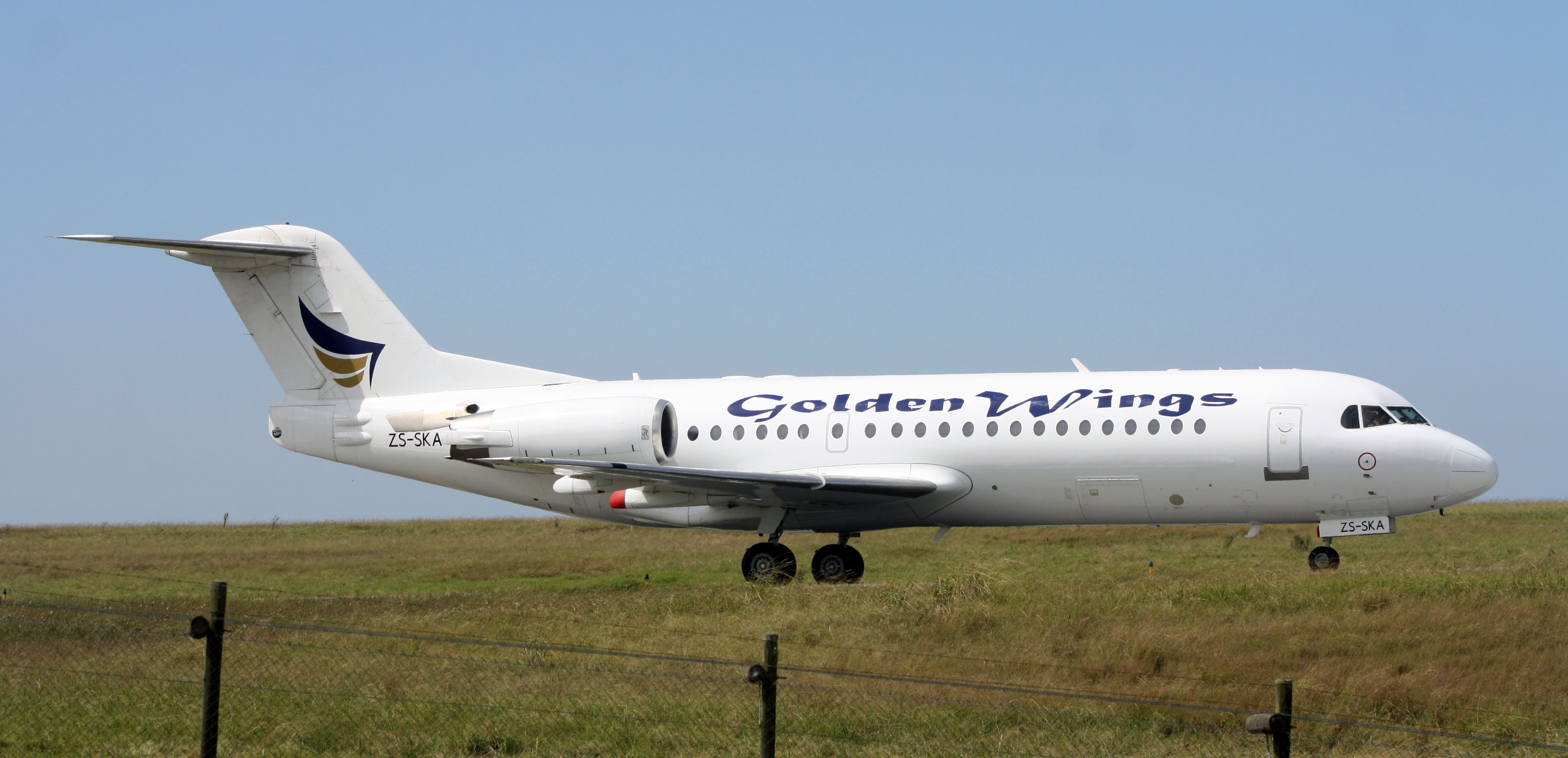
- Fokker F70 in 2016
IATA	ICAO	Call sign
n/a	n/a	n/a
- Founded: 2014
- Operating bases: Juba International Airport
- Focus cities: Juba, Wau
- Fleet size: 8
- Destinations: 2
- Headquarters: Juba International Airport, Juba, South Sudan
- Key people: Obaj William Olau (managing director & CEO)
- Website: www.goldenwingssouthsudan.com

Golden Wings Aviation South Sudan (IATA: n/a, ICAO: n/a) was a privately owned airline based in Juba, South Sudan. The carrier operated as a regional affiliate of South African carrier, Golden Wings Aviation, under a South African Air Operator's Certificate.

== History ==
Golden Wings Aviation was founded in 2014 by Obac William Olawo, a South Sudanese businessman from Upper Nile state as a South Sudanese start-up. The company successfully launched domestic flights between the South Sudanese capital of Juba and Wau, the capital of the Western Bahr el Ghazal state, using a Fokker 70 wet-leased from South Africa's SKA Aviation. Managing director Obaj William Olau said the route would operate four times weekly.

At the time of opening, the new airline intended to establish additional domestic flights to Malakal, Yei, and Aweil with regional services to Entebbe International Airport in Uganda, also planned in the future. The present turmoil in the country is seen as a bonus to local airlines, as travelers opt for air transport over road transport to avoid ambushes, besides many of the key trunk roads across the South Sudan still being in a poor state.

=== Company news ===
On July 16, 2015, it was announced that Golden Wings would lease a Yak-42D Skyliner Aviation from Moldovan ACMI/charter specialist MEGAviation, to expand service. At that time, the airline had expanded charter and scheduled services to Palouch, Malakal, Wau, Yaida, Aweil, Yambio, and Rumbek, all in South Sudan. Services to Khartoum in neighboring Sudan were also available.

In July, Golden Wings Aviation also announced that it had been named as the official franchise holder for Million Air, an award-winning fixed-base operator in the United States. Talks are now underway that could see the firm utilize the Million Air name and brand for various projects at various airports in South Africa and across the continent as a whole that could see the firm utilize the Million Air name and brand for various projects at various airports in South Africa and across the continent as a whole.

On February 15, 2016, it was announced Golden Wings was expanding their operations from originally focusing on South Sudan to exploring new opportunities in Ghana, Nigeria and Uganda amongst various other African countries. At this point, Golden Wings Aviation’s fleet has grown rapidly and now consisted of 12 aircraft. The company possesses a Fokker F70, a 75-seater regional jet liner powered by two Rolls-Royce TAY 620-15 engines, two Beechcraft 1900Ds, regional turboprop airliners powered by two Pratt & Whitney PT6A67Ds and two de Havilland Dash 8 Q300s. A C-208 Caravan was later added to their fleet, and Golden Wings also manages a Boeing 727 Freighter for SKA International and was expected to add a 100-seater VVIP aircraft, as of February 2017.

On May 25, 2016, the company announced it was closing down operations in Bor, Panyangor, Pibor, Yei and Yambio following the rising inflation rates. Other destinations which were discontinued included Asmara, Cairo and Nairobi.

In July 2016, the airline began services to Entebbe International Airport in neighboring Uganda.

== Destinations ==
As of 9 October 2017, Golden Wings Aviation served the following destinations:

=== Current destinations ===
^{Hub}	Hub
¤	Focus cities
^{[T]}	International destinations

Country	City	Airport	Notes	Refs
South Sudan	Juba	Juba International Airport	*Main HUB; *Founding destination	
South Sudan	Wau	Wau Airport	*Focus city *Founding destination	
South Sudan	Aweil	Aweil Airport	*Opened in 2015	
South Sudan	Malakal	Malakal Airport	*Opened in 2015	
South Sudan	Paloich	Paloich Airport	*Opened in 2015	
South Sudan	Rumbek	Rumbek Airport	*Opened in 2015	
Sudan	Khartoum	Khartoum International Airport	*Opened in 2015	
Uganda	Entebbe	Entebbe International Airport	*Opened in 2016	

=== Future and discontinued destinations ===
^	Future destinations
^{[T]}	Terminated destinations

Country	City	Airport	Notes	Refs
South Sudan	Bor	Bor Airport	Closed operations in 2016	
South Sudan	Pibor	Pibor Airport	Closed operations in 2016	
South Sudan	Yambio	Yambio Airport	Closed operations in 2016	
South Sudan	Yei	Yei Airport	Closed operations in 2016	
Egypt	Cairo	Cairo International Airport	Closed operations in 2016	
Eritrea	Asmara	Asmara International Airport	Closed operations in 2016	
Kenya	Nairobi	Jomo Kenyatta International Airport	Closed operations in 2016	

== Fleet ==
As of October 2017, the Golden Wings Aviation fleet consisted of the following aircraft:

Golden Wings Aviation fleet
Aircraft	In service	Orders	Passengers	Notes
Fokker F70	1	—	75	
Beechcraft 1900Ds	2	—		
Havilland Dash 8 Q300s	2	—		
C-208 Caravan	1	—		
Yak-42D	1	—	100-120	Leased
Boeing 727	1	—		Freighter for SKA International
TOTAL	8	—	0	

The GWASS – Golden Wings Aviation South Sudan fleet previously included the following aircraft (as of 9 October 2017):

- 1 Fokker 50 - 58 max cap. Leased from SKA South Africa.
