= Southern Star Airlines =

South Sudanese domestic airline

- "The Southern Pride"
IATA	ICAO	Call sign
4P	–	–
- Founded: 2011
- Commenced operations: 2011
- Ceased operations: 2011
- Hubs: Juba Airport
- Fleet size: 1
- Destinations: 5
- Headquarters: Juba, South Sudan
- Key people: Ahmad Issa (Chairman & MD)
- Website: flysouthernstar.com

Southern Star Airlines was a short-lived South Sudanese domestic airline based in Juba, the capital and largest city of South Sudan. Southern Star Airlines was founded since the independence of the country on 9 July 2011. The airline owned only one aircraft, which was one de Havilland Canada DHC-8-100. Southern Star Airlines' inaugural flight took place on 20 August 2011. However, after only two months of "erratic operations", the airline closed, shut down all operations, and gave away its one and only aircraft to the Kenyan-based airline ALS.

== History ==
Southern Star Airlines formed in 2011 shortly after its independence from Sudan. Ahmad Issa was appointed as the chairman and managing director of the company when it formed. The airline acquired one Bombardier Dash 8 for the airline, registration 5Y-BZI. The aircraft, previously leased to airlines such as Piedmont Airlines, Sakhalin Aviation, and TMK Air Commuter, was first leased to Piedmont Airlines back in 1988, and eventually was leased to Southern Star Airlines in August 2011. The first flight from the airline took place on 20 August 2011. The airline maintained steady operations, but two months into its business, the airline shut down all of its operations. The sole aircraft of the airline was leased to ALS - Aircraft Leasing Services in December 2011. The aircraft has been with that airline ever since.

== Destinations ==
All of Southern Star Airlines destinations were exclusively inside of South Sudan. The destinations Southern Star Airlines served were Juba (landing at Juba International Airport), Malakal (landing at Malakal Airport), Rumbek (landing at Rumbek Airport), Aweil (landing at Aweil Airport), and Wau (landing at Wau Airport).

== Fleet ==
When the airline shut down all operations in October 2011, its fleet consisted of only one aircraft:

Aircraft type	Registration	Number owned	Status
De Havilland Canada DHC-8-100	5Y-BZI	1	Leased to Aircraft Leasing Services
