= Golden Wings (disambiguation) =

Golden Wings is an album by German singer Zoe Wees.

Golden Wings may also refer to:

== Aviation ==
- Golden Wings Aviation, defunct airline in South Sudan
- Golden Wings Charters, airline in The Bahamas
- Golden Wings Flying Museum, defunct museum in Minnesota

== Other uses ==
- Golden Wings and Other Stories, by William Morris
- Golden Wings in Snowfield, roller coaster in Beijing

== See also ==
- Golden Wing Club, Ansett Australia airport lounges
- Kura Pokkhir Shunne Ura, Bangladeshi art film
