= Thar Jath Airstrip =

- IATA: n/a; ICAO: n/a

Summary
- Airport type: Public, Civilian
- Owner: n/a
- Serves: Duar, South Sudan
- Location: Duar, South Sudan
- Coordinates: 08°46′55″N 30°07′52″E

Map
- Location of Thar Jath Airstrip in South Sudan

Runways
Direction	Length		Surface
Direction	ft	m	Surface
14/32	6,561 (est.)	2,000 (est.)	Unpaved

Thar Jath Airstrip is an airport in South Sudan.

== Location ==
Thar Jath Airstrip (IATA: n/a, ICAO: n/a) is located in Guit County, Unity State, in the Greater Upper Nile Region of South Sudan, near the town of Duar.

This location lies approximately 464 kilometres (288 mi), by air, north of Juba International Airport, the largest airport in South Sudan. The geographic coordinates of this airport are: 8° 46' 55.24"N, 30° 7' 52.42"E (Latitude: 8.782013; Longitude: 30.131228). The elevation of Thar Jath Airstrip is unknown. The airport has a single unpaved runway, the dimensions of which are not publicly known at this time.

== Overview ==
Thar Jath Airstrip is a small civilian airport that serves the town of Duar and surrounding communities. It also serves the Thar Jath oil field. There are no known scheduled airlines serving this airport at this time, but the United Nations Humanitarian Air Service served the field from Rumbek Airport.

== See also ==
- Block 5A, South Sudan
- Unity State
- List of airports in South Sudan
