= Pochalla Airport =

Airport in South Sudan

- IATA: n/a; ICAO: HSPA

Summary
- Airport type: Public, Civilian
- Owner: Civil Aviation Authority of South Sudan
- Serves: Pochalla, South Sudan
- Location: Pochalla, South Sudan
- Elevation AMSL: 2,000 ft / 600 m
- Coordinates: 07°10′48″N 34°05′42″E

Map
- Location of Pochalla Airport in South Sudan

Runways
Direction	Length		Surface
Direction	ft	m	Surface
			Unpaved

Pochalla Airport is an airport serving Pochalla in South Sudan.

== Location ==
Pochalla Airport (IATA: n/a, ICAO: HSPA) is located in Pochalla County in the Greater Pibor Administrative Area, in the town of Pochalla, in eastern South Sudan, at the international border with Ethiopia.

This location lies approximately 375 kilometres (233 mi), by air, east of Juba International Airport, the largest airport in South Sudan. The geographic coordinates of Pochalla Airport are: 7° 10' 48.00" N, 34° 5' 42.00"E (Latitude: 7.1800; Longitude: 34.0950). Pochalla Airport is situated 600 metres (2,000 ft) above sea level. The airport has a single unpaved runway.

== Overview ==
Pochalla Airport is a small civilian airport that serves the town of Pochalla and Boma National Park. There are no scheduled flights at Pochalla Airport at this time.

== See also ==
- Greater Pibor Administrative Area
- Greater Upper Nile
- List of airports in South Sudan
