= John Lee Tae-seok =

South Korean Roman Catholic priest

The Reverend John Lee Tae-seok SDB
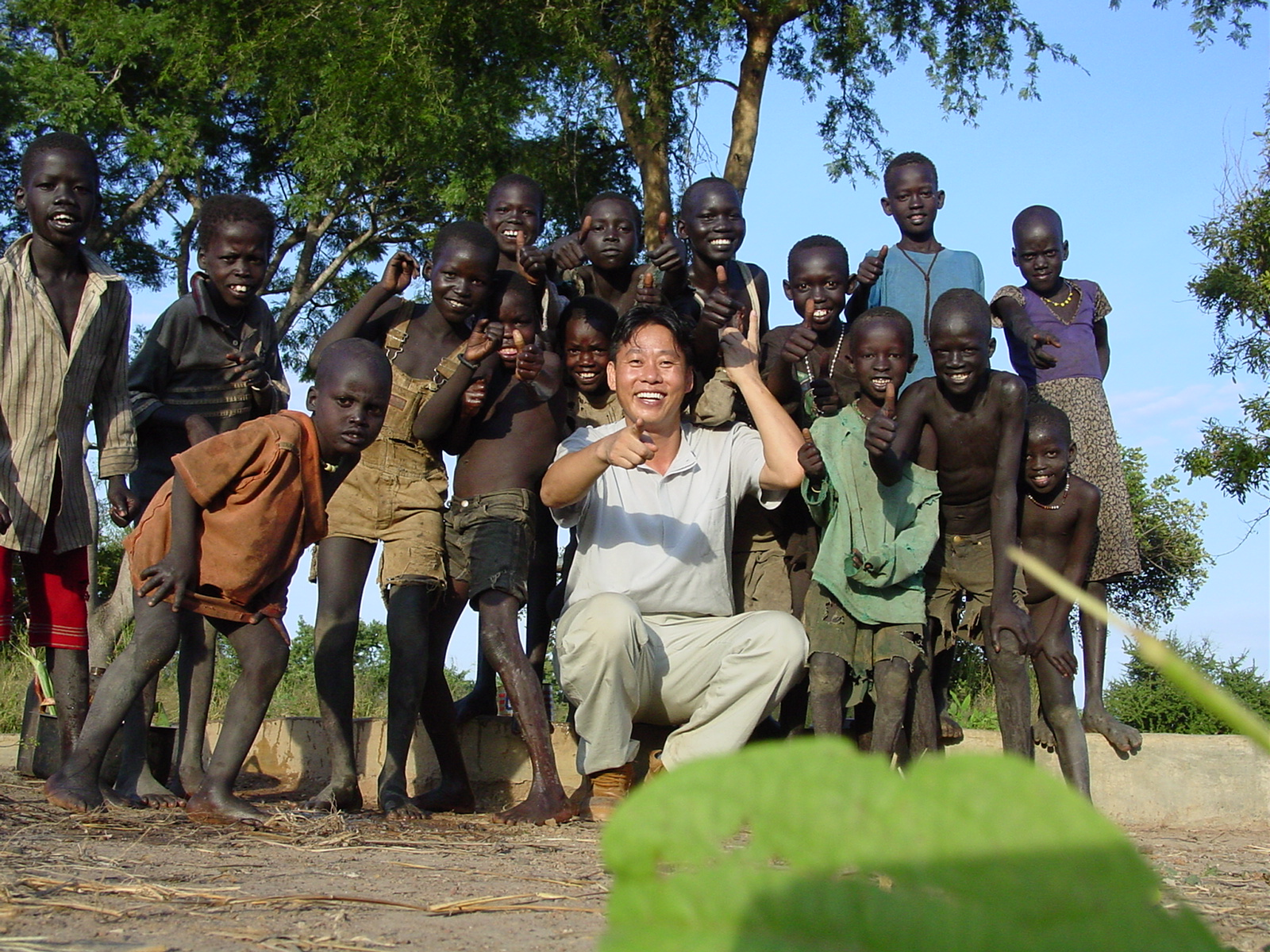
- Born: Lee Tae-seok; October 17, 1962; Busan, South Korea
- Died: January 14, 2010 (aged 47); Seoul, South Korea
- Burial place: Damyang, South Jeolla, South Korea; 35.370728°N 126.965663°E
- Known for: Volunteer work in South Sudan

Korean name
- Hangul: 이태석
- Hanja: 李泰錫
- RR: I Taeseok
- MR: I T'aesŏk

John Lee Tae-seok, SDB (October 17, 1962 – January 14, 2010) was a South Korean Catholic missionary priest, teacher, architect, doctor, and brass band conductor.

== Early life ==
Lee was born in Busan, South Korea.

Born among 10 siblings in Nambumin-dong, Busan, he was baptized as an infant by 'Father Aloisio Schwarz' at Songdo Cathedral. At the age of nine, his father died, and his mother continued to raise her children. When he was in elementary school, he saw the movie "Molokai," which is about the lives of Hansen's disease patients abandoned on Hawaii's Molokai Island and Belgian missionary Damian. After this experience, he promised to live the same life as Father Damian. During his school days, he continued religious activities such as Sunday school teaching, youth associations, student council, choir, and acolyte (the role of helping priests) in Songdo Cathedral.

He graduated from Kyungnam High School in 1981 and graduated from Inje University Medical School in 1987. While serving as a military doctor, he aspired to become a Catholic priest. After completing his military service, he joined the 'Salesian Society of Don Bosco Korea Province' in August 1991, especially with a keen interest in youth education. He then entered the Gwangju Catholic University in 1992 as a member of the 'Salesian Society'. He became novice on January 24, 1993, and he made his first profession on January 30, 1994. After completing his two-year philosophy course at Gwangju Catholic University, he also practiced a two-year course at the Salesian Monastery in Daelim-dong, Seoul. He then studied at the Pontifical Salesian University in 1997. While attending there, he met Brother Comino who had already served as a missionary in Korea for 20 years and was sent to Sudan in 1991. When Brother Comino stopped by Rome on vacation, Tae-seok Lee was encouraged to become a missionary after hearing Sudan's story from Brother Comino. When he stopped by Kenya in Africa for a missionary experience on vacation in 1999, he met a priest named James, an Indian-born Salesian who was active in Tonj, South Sudan. After visiting Tonj, he was strongly impressed and decided to devote his life to the poor children of Tonj.

== Education and military service ==
He studied medicine at Inje University, graduating in 1987, before joining the Korean military where he worked as a medical officer.

In 1992 he graduated in theology at Gwangju Catholic University.

== Career ==
He left to Africa as a missionary in October 2001 and was appointed to Tonj, Warrap state of Southern Sudan, on 7 December. He saw the misery of a village devastated by poverty, hunger, and disease there, and he was devoted to medical volunteer work and relief movements as well as missionary work. He built a 12-room hospital and built a clinic, took care of 200 to 300 patients a day, and toured around 80 nearby villages and vaccinated villagers. He also taught math and music by creating a school and setting up a 12-year course in elementary, middle and high school. He built a dormitory and taught musical instruments by making a 'Tonj brass band'.

In 2005 his unstinting work was officially recognized, and he received the Seventh Injae Humanitarian Award. He did not look after his own health and on January 14, 2010, he died.

== Death ==
When Tae-Sok briefly entered Korea on vacation in November 2008, he was diagnosed with stage 4 colon cancer and could not return to Tonj. He died on January 14, 2010, at 5:35 a.m. in the age of 48 at Catholic University Seoul St. Mary's Hospital in Seocho District, Seoul, in the presence of brothers of the Salesian Society, his family and relatives. His remains were buried in Salesian Priest's Cemetery, a Catholic cemetery in Damyang-gun, Jeollanam-do. His story was published in the Salesian Society magazine "The Salesian Family". It also published in "Bible Life" by the 'Caritas Sisters of Jesus' and also introduced in a book titled "Father, Will You Be My Friend?".

While he was fighting the cancer which would eventually take his life, he received the Second Korean-American Esteemed Doctor Award.

Tae-seok is buried in Damyang Catholic Park.

== Legacy ==
- 2005 Seventh Injae Humanitarian Award
- 2009 Korean American Esteemed Doctor Award

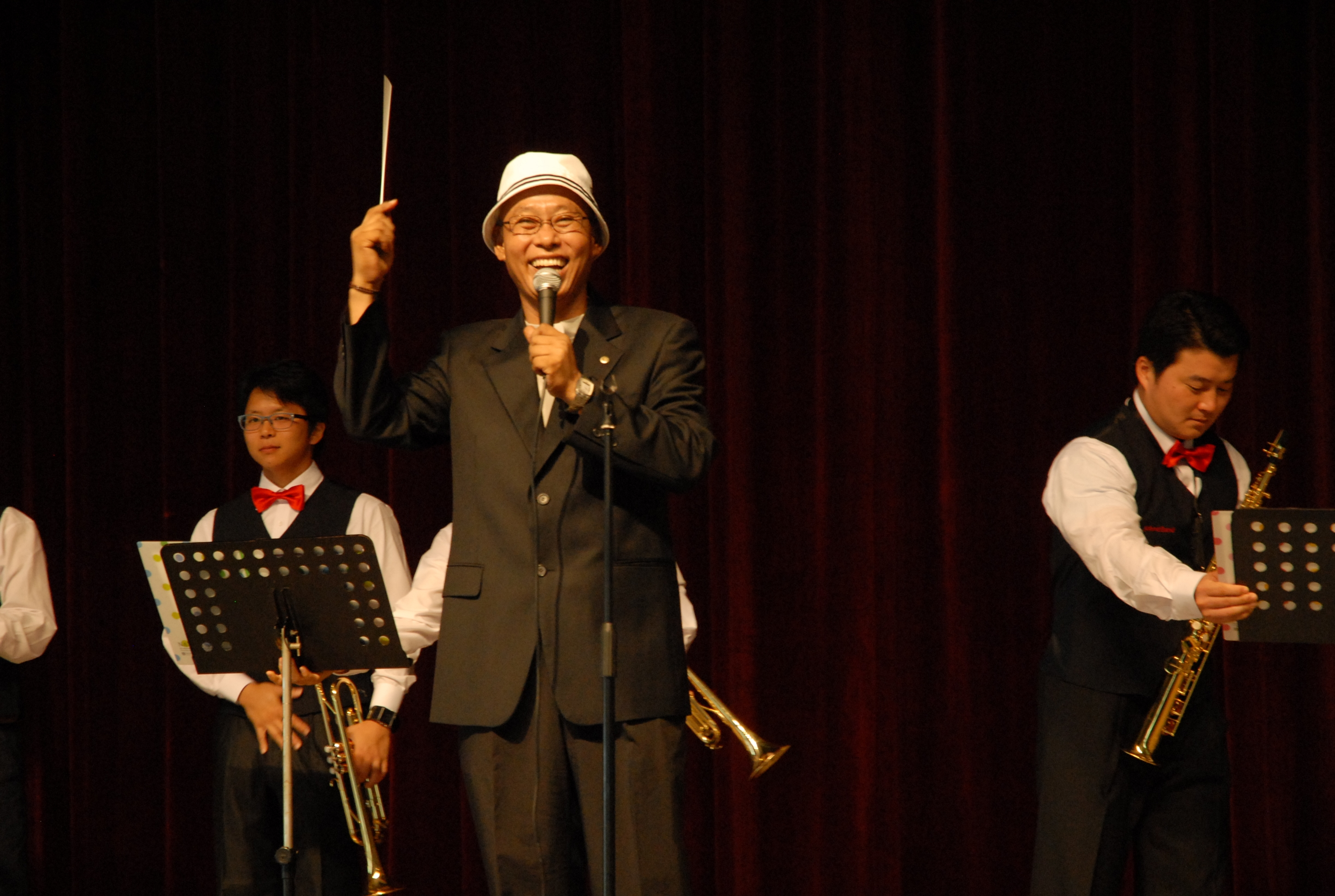
John's band in Korea 2009

His work is featured in the 2010 film Don't Cry for Me, Sudan.

His medical clinic continues under the leadership of his former student, Dr. Thomas Taban Akot.

He is the first foreigner to feature in South Sudanese school text books as a result of volunteer work.

The 35-member brass band's work continues and visited his grave in 2012.

During his lifetime, Tae-seok Lee, along with his supporters, founded a foundation to help South Sudanese youth. Its name is Sudan Children's Scholarship Association. Another name is Fr. John Lee memorial Foundation.

The Lee Tae-seok Love Sharing foundation was created in 2012 and renamed to the Lee Tae-seok Foundation in 2020. On 2 April 2020 it was formally registered as an NGO in South Sudan.
