= Anywoli =

Ethiopian mancala game

- Ranks: Two
- Sowing: Multilap
- Region: Ethiopia, Sudan

Anywoli is a traditional mancala game played by the Anuak people of the Gambela province, in Ethiopia, as well as in the Akobo, Pochalla and Jokau regions of Sudan. The name of the game means "bringing to life" ("giving birth"). Anywoli has similarities to mancalas found in Nigeria and Ghana, such as Ba-awa and Obridjie.

== Rules ==
The board used to play Anywoli has two rows of twelve holes each. Anuak call these holes "oto" (pl.: "udi"), meaning "house". At game setup, four seeds are placed in each hole. Seeds are called "nyibaré", meaning "children (sons) of the board game".

Players take turns; each owns one of the rows.

At his or her turn, the player takes all the seeds from one of his/her holes and relay sows them counterclockwise. The sowing ends when the last seed falls in an empty hole or when a capture occurs.

Capture occurs whenever, during play, a hole holds exactly four seeds: those seeds are removed from the game, and taken by the player who owns the hole. In the special case where the last seed of a sowing is placed in a hole holding three seeds (thus forming a four-seed hole), the captured seeds are taken by the player who is moving, independent of who owns the hole. This also ends the player's turn.

When only 8 seeds are left on a board, the player who moved first at the beginning of the game captures them and the game ends. The winner is the player who captured most seeds.
