= Gola Boyoi Gola =

South Sudanese politician

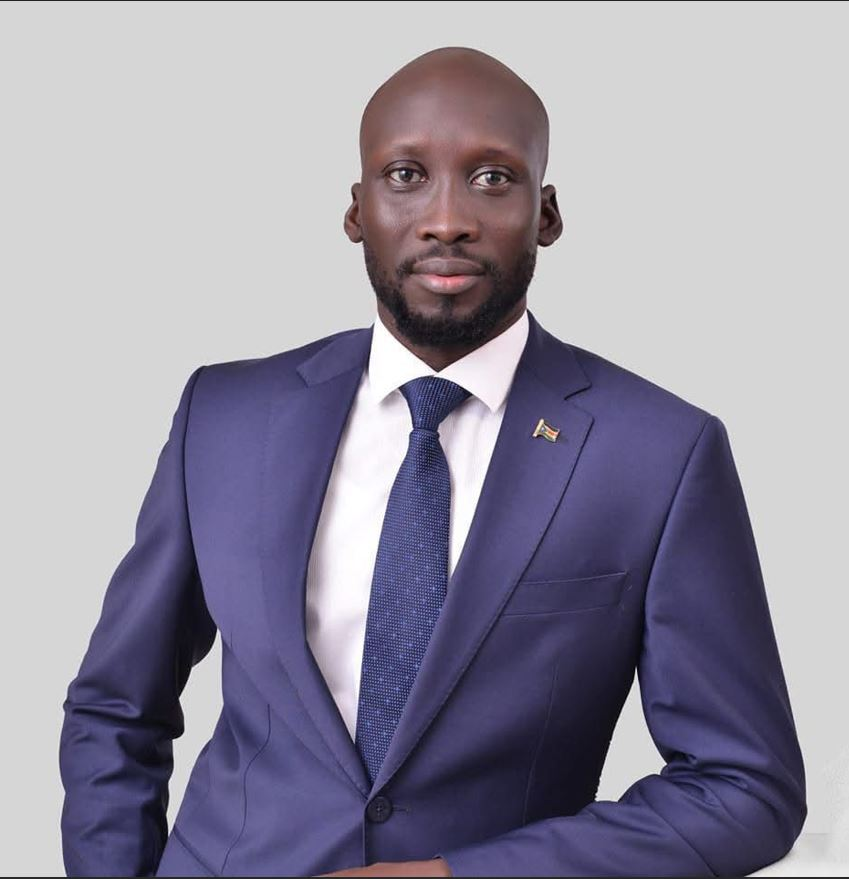

Chief Administrator of Greater Pibor
- Incumbent
- Assumed office July 2025
- Preceded by: Peter Guzulu Maze
- In office 15 April 2024 – 17 January 2025
- Preceded by: Lokoli Ame Bullen
- Succeeded by: Peter Guzulu Maze

Personal details
- Party: Sudan People's Liberation Movement (SPLM)

Gola Boyoi Gola is a South Sudanese politician. He is the Chief Administrator of the Greater Pibor Administrative Area. He was appointed to the position in April 2024 in a presidential decree by President Salva Kiir, replacing Lokoli Ame Bullen. Gola was relieved from the position on January 17, 2025, in a presidential decree, after serving barely 9 months, but was reinstated in July 2025.

== Political career ==
Gola previously served as the Chairperson of the South Sudan National Youth Union. He was elected as president of the youth union in a four-year tenure following an election marred with controversy in Juba in 2019. Following his win, Gola was accused of intimidating his opponents, claims he dismissed. In August 2023, Gola's cabinet announced that it would step down after its four-year reign ended.

== Suspension from union office ==
in May 2022, the South Sudan minister of youth and sports, Albino Bol, suspended Gola over claims that he overstepped his jurisdictions as youth leader. Albino accused Gola of writing a letter to the president of the Arab Republic of Egypt and the leader of the Sudan Sovereign Council about the issue of Abyei Administrative Area. But Gola defied his suspension and remained in office, terming the suspension as unconstitutional.

In November 2022, Gola issued an apology to the minister after a seven-month standoff between the two youth leaders.

=== Suspension lifted ===
In December 2022, Minister Albino lifted the suspension after Gola apologised in a letter to the minister in November of the same year.
