= HSMK =

HSMK may refer to:

- Humayun Saqib Muazzam Khan
- Rumbek Airport's ICAO code
