= Pibor Airport =

- IATA: n/a; ICAO: HSPI

Summary
- Airport type: Public, Civilian
- Owner: Civil Aviation Authority of South Sudan
- Serves: Pibor, South Sudan
- Location: Pibor, South Sudan
- Elevation AMSL: 1,352 ft / 412 m
- Coordinates: 06°47′37″N 33°07′49″E

Map
- Location of Pibor Airport in South Sudan

Runways
Direction	Length		Surface
Direction	ft	m	Surface
	3,599	1,097	Unpaved

Pibor Airport is an airport serving the town of Pibor, in South Sudan.

== Location ==
Pibor Airport (IATA: n/a, ICAO: HSPI) is located in Pibor County in the Greater Pibor Administrative Area in the town of Pibor. The airport is located approximately 3 kilometres (1.9 mi) west of the Pibor market.

This location lies approximately 274 kilometres (170 mi), by air, northeast of Juba International Airport, the largest airport in South Sudan. The geographic coordinates of Pibor Airport are: 6° 47' 24.00"N, 33° 8' 6.00"E (Latitude: 6.7900; Longitude: 33.1350). The airport is situated 412 metres (1,352 ft) above sea level. The airport has a single unpaved runway, measuring 1,097 metres (3,599 ft).

== Overview ==
Pibor Airport is a small civilian airport that serves the town of Pibor and surrounding communities. There are no known scheduled airlines serving Pibor Airport at this time.

== See also ==
- Pibor
- Greater Pibor Administrative Area
- Greater Upper Nile
- List of airports in South Sudan
