= Jill Seaman =

American doctor

- Education: Middlebury College, University of Washington School of Medicine
- Awards: MacArthur Fellows Program
- Scientific career
- Workplaces: Médecins Sans Frontières, Sudan Medical Relief

Jill Seaman is an American doctor who used to work with Médecins Sans Frontières (MSF). She is a native of Moscow, Idaho and a graduate of Middlebury College and the University of Washington School of Medicine.

== Life ==
Early in her career, she was a public health care provider to the Yup'ik Native American tribe of Alaska. Her most notable work was eight years in the South Sudan fighting an epidemic of visceral leishmaniasis, between 1989 and 1997. The MSF clinic in Duar, Unity State was destroyed by militia in June 1998 as part of a drive to clear the region of people so the Block 5A oil concession could be developed. Since that time she has been an advocate for increased aid and research for this and other parasitic diseases. She is the founder of Sudan Medical Relief (formerly the Sudan TB Project), launched in 2000. In 2000 Jill Seaman and Sjoukje de Wit, RN, returned to Duar to provide treatment for tuberculosis.

Seaman was named a MacArthur Fellow in 2009.
