= Kajo Keji Airstrip =

Kajo Keji Airport
- IATA: n/a; ICAO: HSKJ

Summary
- Airport type: Public, Civilian
- Owner: Civil Aviation Authority of South Sudan
- Location: Kajo Keji, South Sudan
- Elevation AMSL: 3,123 ft (952 m)
- Coordinates: 03°51′19″N 31°39′32″E

Map
- Location of Kago Kaju Airport in South Sudan

Runways
Direction	Length		Surface
Direction	ft	m	Surface
13/31	2,990 (est.)	910 (est.)	Unpaved

Kajo Keji is an airstrip serving the town of Kajo Keji, in South Sudan.

== Overview ==
Kajo Keji Airstrip (IATA: n/a, ICAO: HSKJ) is located in Kajo Keji County, in Central Equatoria State, in the town of Kajo Keji, near the International border with the Republic of Uganda.

The distance between Juba International Airport and Kajo Keji Airstrip by air is approximately 112.8 km (70.1 mi). The geographic coordinates of Kago Kaju Airport are: 3° 51' 19.00"N, 31° 39' 32.00"E (Latitude: 3.9170; Longitude: 31.6670). This airport sits at an elevation of 952 metres (2,500 ft) above sea level. The airstrip has a single unpaved runway, the dimensions of which, are not publicly known at this time.

== See also ==
- Equatoria Region
- List of airports in South Sudan
