= Ba-awa =

Mancala from Ghana

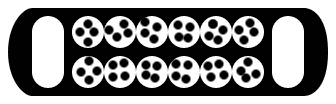
- Starting setup
- Ranks: Two
- Sowing: Multilap
- Region: Ghana

Ba-awa is a variant of the game of mancala originating in Ghana. Although played in some of the same regions as Oware, it is simpler and in traditional societies is considered a game for women and children. Ba-awa is related to games j'erin and obridjie played in Nigeria. It is also similar to mancala game anywoli played at the Ethiopian-Sudanese border.

== Rules ==
These are the rules as used by the Twi, an Akan people from Ghana.

=== Equipment ===
The Ba-awa board has six pits in front of each player, and (optionally) one pit at each end which stores captured seeds.

The only pieces are 48 undifferentiated seeds or other small objects.

=== Setup ===
Typically, several games are played in a row.

At the beginning of the first game four seeds are placed in each pit except the end pits. Subsequent games also begin with four seeds in each pit, however the ownership of the pits may have changed.

=== Object ===
The nominal object of a match is to gain control of all the pits on the board; however, this is so hard the game is usually only played to ten or eleven pits.

=== Sowing ===
Players take turns moving the seeds. On a turn, a player chooses one of the pits under their control. The player removes all seeds from this pit, and distributes them in each pit counter-clockwise from this pit, in a process called sowing. Seeds are not distributed into the end scoring pits. If the last seed ends in an occupied pit, then all the seeds in that pit including the last one are resown starting from that pit. These multiple turns continue until the sowing process ends, either in an empty pit or a capture of four seeds.

=== Capturing ===
If at any time during sowing, a pit has exactly four seeds, all four are immediately captured and removed from play. There can be many such captures during sowing. Also, if the last pit sown into then has four seeds, these four seeds are captured and the sowing process ends.

== End of the game ==
When there are just eight seeds left on the board, the player who began the game takes these and the game ends. In the next game, each player begins with a pit for each four seeds captured. Since captures are always made in multiples of four, this will be even.
