= Baba Medan Konya =

South Sudanese politician

Baba Medan Konya has been the Governor of Boma State, South Sudan since 24 December 2015. He is the first governor of the state, which was created by President Salva Kiir on 2 October 2015.
