= Hawker Siddeley Andover =

Military transport aircraft series by Hawker Siddeley, later British Aerospace

HS 780 Andover
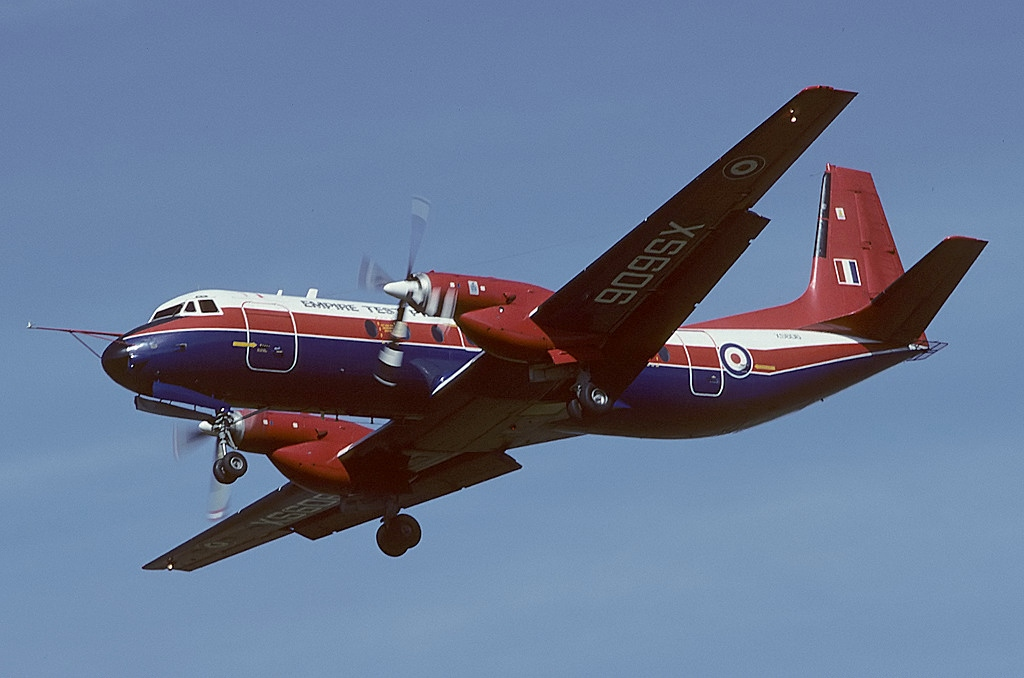
- Andover C.1 operated by Empire Test Pilots' School, this example being seen in 1995.

General information
- Type: Transport aircraft
- Manufacturer: Hawker Siddeley
- Status: Retired
- Primary users: Royal Air Force Royal New Zealand Air Force; 748 Air Services
- Number built: 37

History
- First flight: 21 December 1963
- Retired: 1998 (RNZAF) early 2000s (RAF) 2015 (Commercial)
- Developed from: Hawker Siddeley HS 748

The Hawker Siddeley HS 780 Andover is a twin-engined turboprop military transport aircraft produced by Hawker Siddeley for the Royal Air Force (RAF), developed from the Avro-designed HS 748 airliner. The Andover was named after the Avro Andover, a biplane transport used by the RAF for medical evacuation between the first and second world wars; and RAF Andover, where some of its trials were carried out. The Andover had a kneeling landing gear to make ramp loading easier.

== Design and development ==
At the start of the 1960s the Royal Air Force (RAF) issued a requirement for a medium tactical freighter. Avro started work on a military variant of the Rolls-Royce Dart-powered twin-engined Avro 748 airliner. Handley Page also proposed a variant of the Handley Page Herald. Both types were tested by the RAF in February 1962 at Martlesham Heath in Suffolk. A prototype Avro 748 Srs 2 was used for the trials.

The RAF decided to order a military variant of the 748, designated the Avro 780; and the original Avro 748 prototype was modified with an upswept rear fuselage and rear loading ramp as the Avro 748MF, to test the military version. It had more powerful Dart Mk 301s engines and a unique kneeling landing gear. In April 1963, the RAF ordered 31 aircraft with the service designation Andover C.1. The 748MF first flew from Woodford Aerodrome on 21 December 1963. The aircraft had larger four-bladed propellers than the 748, which required a greater distance between the engines and the fuselage, although the wingtips were reduced by 18 inches to maintain the same wingspan as the 748. A dihedral tailplane was also fitted to keep it clear of the propeller slipstream.

The first production Andover C.1 flew from Woodford on 9 July 1965 and the first four aircraft were used for trials and tests with Hawker Siddeley and the Aeroplane and Armament Experimental Establishment at Boscombe Down. Following a release to service in May 1966, the fifth production aircraft was delivered to No. 46 Squadron RAF at RAF Abingdon in June 1966. Subsequent RAF types are the Andover CC.2 VIP transport and Andover E.3 electronic calibration aircraft.

== Operational history ==
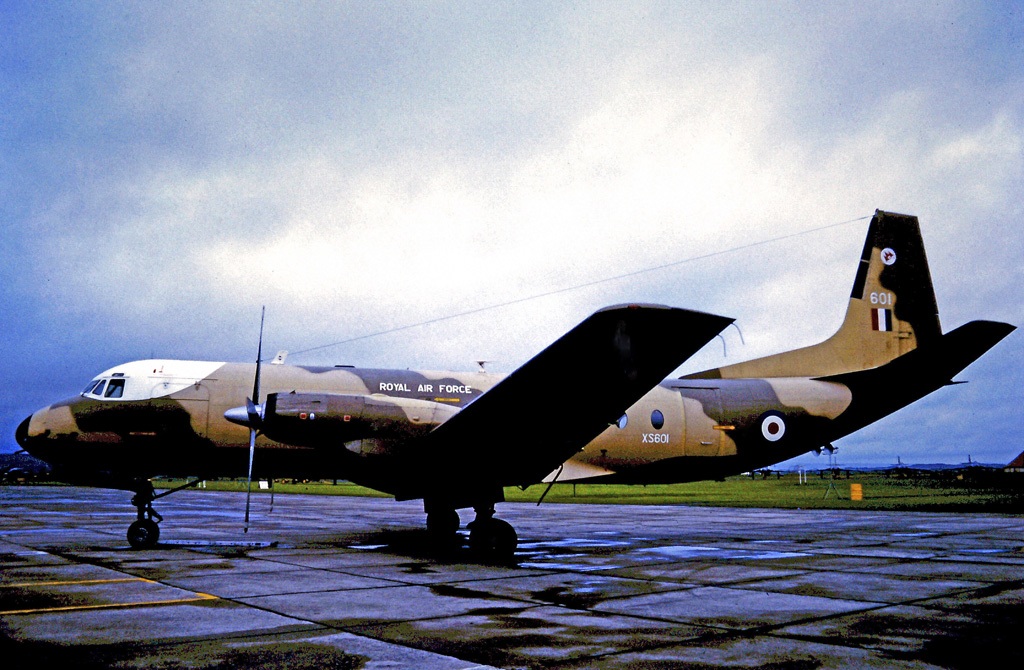
Andover C.1 of 46 Squadron RAF in 1971

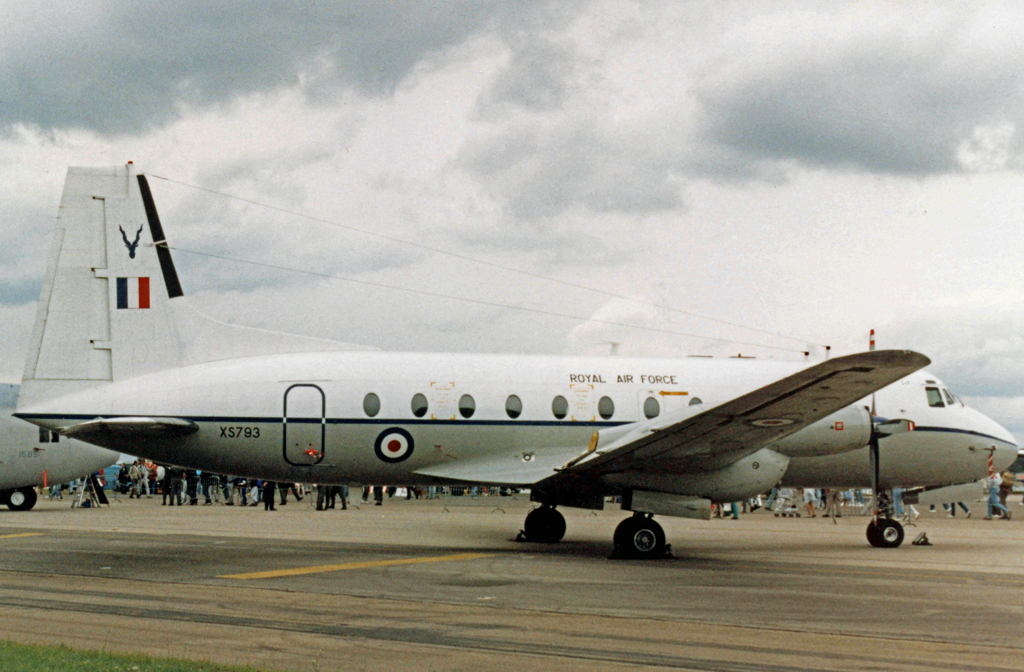
Andover CC.2 of 60 Squadron RAF in 1987

The Andover C.1 was flown for the first time on 9 July 1965 and the first four examples were flown to RAF Boscombe Down for acceptance trials that year. The full contract of 31 aircraft were delivered to squadrons in Transport Command. These were No. 46 Squadron RAF at RAF Abingdon and later RAF Thorney Island, No. 52 Squadron RAF at RAF Seletar (Far East) and No. 84 Squadron RAF at RAF Sharjah (Middle East).

There was a follow-on order placed with Hawker Siddeley for six aircraft as the CC.2, a version of the standard HS 748, and these went initially to 21 Squadron at RAF Khormaksar. The squadron had these for six months before being disbanded; the aircraft went to 32 Squadron at RAF Northolt, the "Metropolitan Communications Squadron". The aircraft were with 32 Squadron for over 18 years, including some time spent on detachment at RAF Bruggen (Germany).

Three of the RAF Andovers continued to fly into the second decade of the 21st century, a C.1 with the Empire Test Pilots' School and one C.1 with the Heavy Aircraft Test Squadron of the Joint Test and Evaluation Group. The remaining aircraft was a modified C.1 converted for photo-reconnaissance, the Andover C.1(PR), serial number XS596; the UK-named aircraft under the Treaty on Open Skies; all three were based at RAF Boscombe Down.

The Royal New Zealand Air Force operated ten aircraft from 1976, acquired from the RAF while still relatively new. These saw service with UN missions to Somalia and on the Iran-Iraq border and in disaster-relief work in the Pacific. The type was retired from service in 1998. The main difficulty with the Andover's service in New Zealand was its limited range—1,000 nmi (1,900 km) of Pacific Ocean separates New Zealand from its nearest neighbours. New Zealand's Andovers were purchased to replace the Bristol Freighter which had even shorter range.

In 1996, Zaire's president Mobutu Sese Seko hired Western European mercenaries (mostly French and Belgian), in an attempt of stopping a Rwandan-led advance in the First Congo War. These mercenaries (part of the White Legion) relied on a single Andover to ferry men and supplies between their bases (they also used a Pilatus Turbo Porter, but it crashed shortly after arriving in Zaire). Despite Kabila's rebels attempts to shoot it down, the White Legion's Andover is presumed to have survived the war, being last seen in an airfield at Kisangani in March 1997.

== Variants ==
Avro 748MF
Prototype Avro 748 converted to military prototype which included an upswept rear fuselage and rear loading ramp and unique kneeling landing gear.
Andover C.1
First production series for RAF, 31 aircraft built.
Andover C.1(PR)
Two C1 aircraft were converted for Photographic Reconnaissance duties.
Andover CC.2
Not a variant of the cargo/transport Andover but a VIP transport version of the HS 748.
Andover E.3 / E.3A
Seven C.1 aircraft were converted for radio and airport nav aid calibration. Four aircraft were equipped with an inertial referenced flight inspection system (IRFIS) and were designated E3. The other three aircraft didn't have this equipment installed, and were designated E3A.

== Operators ==
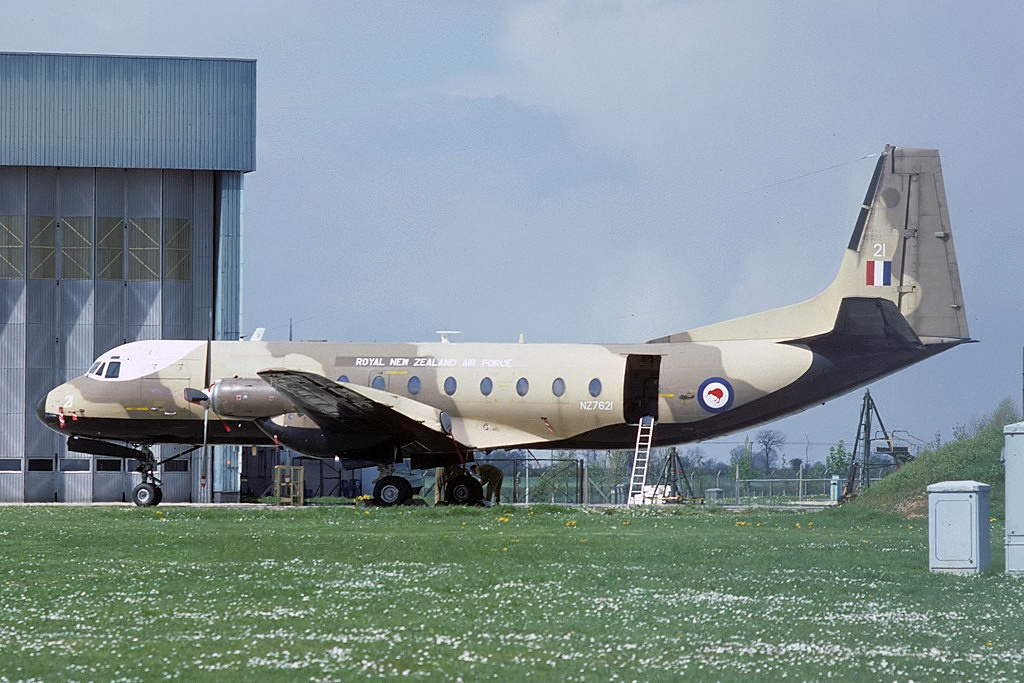
An RNZAF Andover in 1977

=== Military operators ===
NATO
One Royal Air Force aircraft was loaned to NATO and based at Oslo, Norway for use by the Commander Air Force North.

New Zealand

- Royal New Zealand Air Force
  - No. 1 Squadron RNZAF
  - No. 42 Squadron RNZAF

United Kingdom

- Royal Air Force
  - No. 21 Squadron RAF used one aircraft in 1967
  - No. 32 Squadron RAF based at RAF Northolt used for VIP transport and communications work.
  - No. 46 Squadron RAF based at RAF Abingdon and later RAF Thorney Island operated Andovers between 1966 and 1970.
  - No. 48 Squadron RAF based at RAF Changi used for VIP transport between 1969 and 1970
  - No. 51 Squadron RAF
  - No. 52 Squadron RAF based at RAF Seletar and later RAF Changi between March 1967 and December 1969
  - No. 60 Squadron RAF
  - No. 84 Squadron RAF based at RAF Sharjah, operated Andovers (replacing the Blackburn Beverley) from 1967 to 1971 mainly in a search and rescue role in the Gulf area.
  - No. 115 Squadron RAF based at RAF Brize Norton later RAF Benson, operated Andovers (replacing the Armstrong Whitworth AW.660 Argosy) from 1976 in the radio aids calibration role.
  - No. 242 Operational Conversion Unit RAF
  - Queen's Flight RAF
  - Empire Test Pilots' School
  - Royal Aircraft Establishment
  - Defence Research Agency
- Hunting Aviation
  - Military Flight Checking Unit

Zaire

- Forces Armées Zaïroises
  - White Legion used one to transport men and supplies to various French mercenary bases between Kinshasa and Kisangani in the First Congo War.

=== Civil operators ===
Both former RAF and RNZAF aircraft were later sold to civil operators, mainly in Africa. As of July 2010 a total of six ex-military Andovers remained in commercial service, operated by:

Democratic Republic of the Congo

- Air Kasai (1)
- Air Transport Office (1)
- International Trans Air Business (2)
- Waltair (1)

Kenya

- 748 Air Services (2)

As of July 2013 only one Andover remained in commercial service, operated by Kenyan company Wilken Aviation. The aircraft was damaged beyond repair in a non-fatal accident at Malakal Airport in South Sudan on 10 November 2015, leaving no aircraft of the type in commercial service.

== Accidents and incidents ==
- In March 2003, a 748 Air Services Hawker Siddeley Andover, registration 3C-KKB, was damaged beyond repair when it crash landed at Rumbek Airport, in what was then Sudan but is now South Sudan, following an engine failure.
- On November 10, 2015, the last remaining Hawker Siddeley Andover operated by Kenyan company Wilken Aviation was damaged beyond repair in a non-fatal accident at Malakal Airport in South Sudan, leaving no aircraft of the type in commercial service.

== Aircraft on display ==
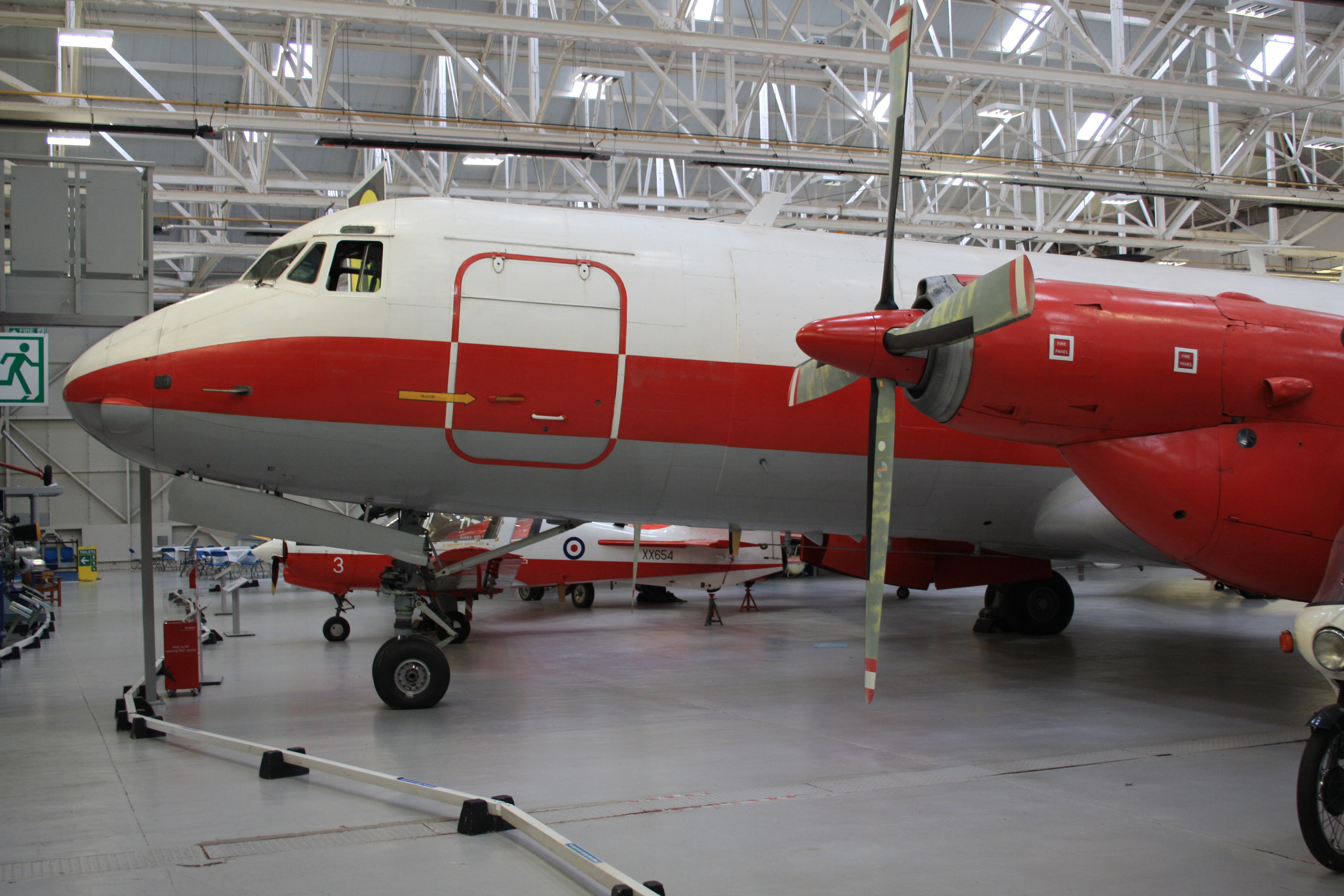
The Andover E.3A on display at Royal Air Force Museum Midlands in 2014

The following aircraft are on public display:

=== New Zealand ===
- Andover C.1 serial NZ7621, a former Royal Air Force aircraft sold to the Royal New Zealand Air Force in 1977, is on display at the Royal New Zealand Air Force Museum in Christchurch.

=== United Kingdom ===
- Andover E.3A serial XS639, a former navigation aid calibration Andover, is exhibited in the Royal Air Force Museum Midlands, located at RAF Cosford in Shropshire.

== Specifications (Andover C.1) ==
Data from Jane's All The World's Aircraft 1966–67

General characteristics

- Crew: 2-3
- Capacity: 52 troops, 40 paratroops or 24 stretcher cases / 14,365 lb (6,516 kg) payload
- Length: 78 ft 0 in (23.77 m)
- Wingspan: 98 ft 3 in (29.95 m)
- Height: 30 ft 1 in (9.17 m)
- Wing area: 831.4 sq ft (77.24 m^{2})
- Airfoil: root: NACA 23018; tip: NACA 4412
- Empty weight: 29,324 lb (13,301 kg) basic operating weight
- Max takeoff weight: 51,000 lb (23,133 kg)
- Fuel capacity: 1,440 imp gal (1,729 US gal; 6,546 L) fuel in integral wing tanks
- Powerplant: 2 × Rolls-Royce RDa.12 Dart Mk 201 turboprop engines, 3,245 shp (2,420 kW) each equivalent
- Propellers: 4-bladed Dowty Rotol, 14 ft 6 in (4.42 m) diameter constant-speed fully-feathering reversible-pitch propellers

Performance

- Maximum speed: 278 kn (320 mph, 515 km/h) at 15,000 ft (4,572 m)
- Cruise speed: 235 kn (270 mph, 435 km/h) at 40,000 lb (18,144 kg)AUW
- Stall speed: 78 kn (90 mph, 144 km/h) flaps and undercarriage extended
- Range: 1,239 nmi (1,426 mi, 2,295 km) with fuel for 200 nmi (230 mi; 370 km) diversion and 30 min holding
- Service ceiling: 24,000 ft (7,300 m)
- Rate of climb: 1,200 ft/min (6.1 m/s)
- Take-off run: 1,030 ft (314 m)
- Take-off distance to 50 ft (15 m): 1,950 ft (594 m)
- Landing run: 1,010 ft (308 m)

== See also ==
Related development

- Hawker Siddeley HS 748
- British Aerospace ATP

Aircraft of comparable role, configuration, and era

- de Havilland Canada DHC-5 Buffalo
- Handley Page Herald

Related lists

- List of civil aircraft
