= J'erin =

Nigerian game

- Ranks: Two
- Sowing: Multilap
- Region: Nigeria

Je'rin, also known as jérin-jérin and Ayo, is a mancala game which is very similar to Ba-awa. It is played by Yoruba people in Nigeria.

== Rules ==
The game has the same rules as Ba-awa except the following:

- The contents of two adjacent holes (a total of eight seeds) are used for the opening move.
- When there are just eight seeds left on the board, the player who captured the first four with the last seed of a lap anywhere on the board takes these and the game ends.
