= Palogue oil field =

Oil field in Melut Basin, South Sudan

Palogue
- Country: South Sudan
- Region: Melut Basin
- Offshore/onshore: onshore
- Operator: Dar Petroleum Operating Company DPOC

Field history
- Discovery: 2003
- Start of production: 2003

Production
- Current production of oil: 160,000 barrels per day (~8.0×10^{6} t/a)
- Estimated oil in place: 389 million tonnes (~ 460×10^{6} m^{3} or 2900 million bbl)

The Palogue oil field is an oil field located in Melut Basin near the settlement Palogue also known as Paloich. It was discovered in 2003 and developed by China National Petroleum Corporation. It began production in 2003 and produces oil. The total proven reserves of the Palogue oil field are around 2.9 billion barrels (389 million tonnes), and production is centered on 22,000 barrels per day (3,500 m^{3}/d).

Paloich Airport and Palouge Power Plant are located in the area to serve oil production needs.

In course of the South Sudanese Civil War, the oil installations at Palogue remained under government control but repeatedly came under attacks from SPLM-IO rebels loyal to Riek Machar. In course of the Pagak offensive in 2017, however, the SPLA claimed to have driven all insurgents from the oil fields and fully secured them.
