= 748 Air Services =

Airline in Kenya

Seven Four Eight Air Services

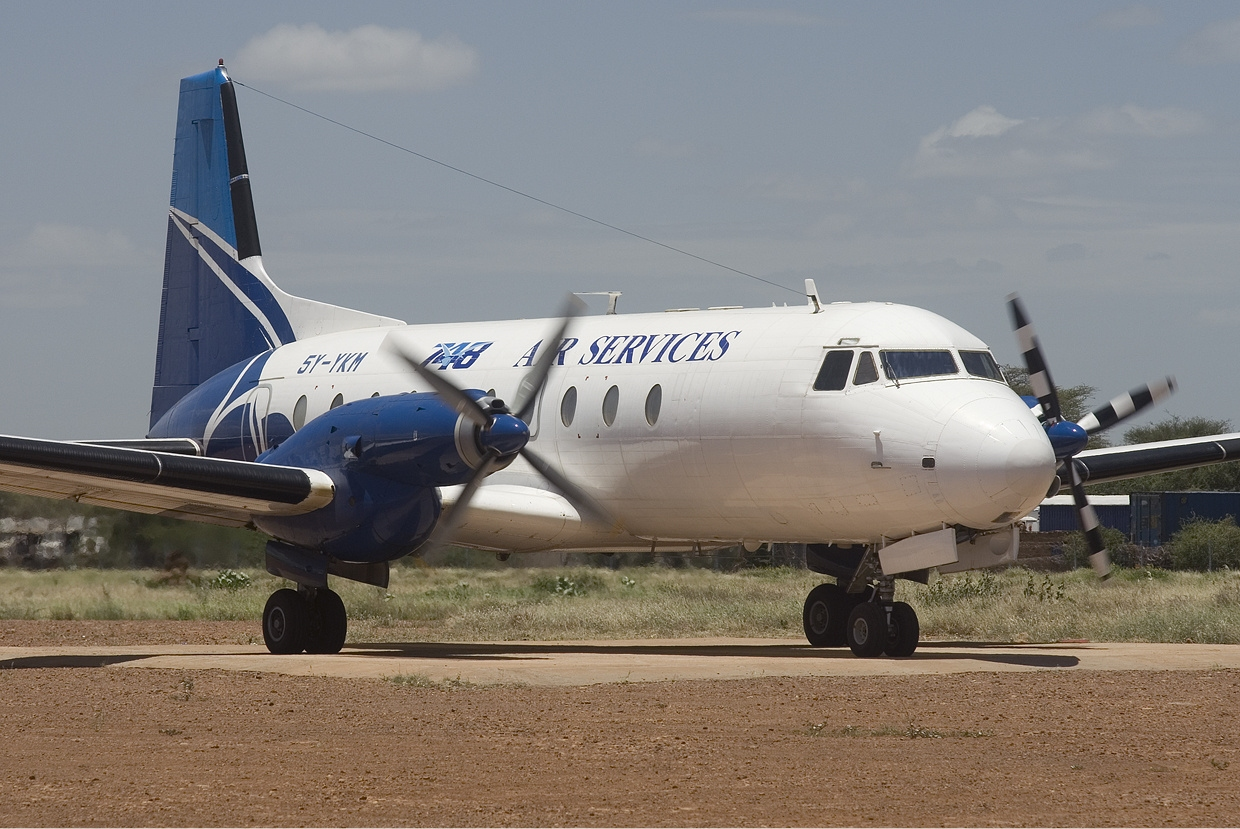
IATA	ICAO	Call sign
FE	IHO	748
- Founded: 1994
- AOC #: 118
- Hubs: Wilson Airport
- Secondary hubs: Juba International Airport
- Focus cities: Juba, Lokichogio
- Fleet size: 12
- Destinations: 78
- Headquarters: Nairobi, Kenya
- Key people: Ahmed Jibril
- Employees: 150-250
- Website: www.748airservicesltd.com

Seven Four Eight Air Services, also known doing business as 748 Air Services is a charter airline operating in the passenger and cargo business. Its head office is in Wilson Airport in Nairobi, Kenya.

== History ==
The airline was established in 1995 by Ahmed Rashid Jibril, its first managing director. Its first aircraft was a Hawker Siddeley 748 giving also the name of the company. The aircraft was used on a charter basis for relief and humanitarian organizations operating in remote areas of Sudan, currently what is South Sudan, Somalia, East Africa and Central Africa.

The airline grew over the years and as of 2019 operated twelve aircraft.

== Fleet ==
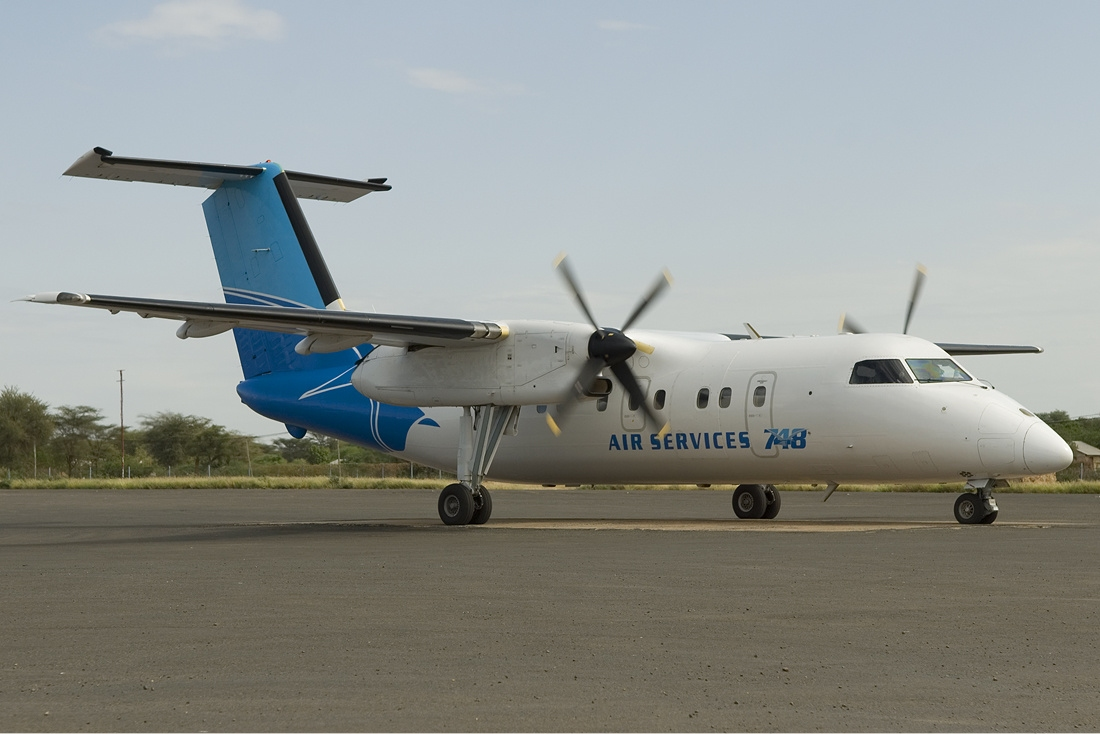
748 Air Services DHC-8-100 at Lokichogio Airport, 2009

=== Current fleet ===
As of July 2026, 748 Air Services operates the following aircraft:

748 Air Services fleet
Aircraft	In service	Orders	Passengers	Notes
Bombardier Dash 8-100	5	—	37	
Bombardier Dash 8-Q400	7	—	78	
Total	12			

=== Former fleet ===
As of August 2025 748 Air Services operated 5 Bombardier Dash 8-100 and 7 Bombardier Dash 8-Q400.

The airline also previously operated the following aircraft:

- 1 further Bombardier Dash 8-100
- British Aerospace 748
- Hawker Siddeley HS. 780 Andover

== Accidents and incidents ==
- In March 2003, a 748 Air Services Hawker Siddeley Andover, registration 3C-KKB, was damaged beyond repair when it crash landed at Rumbek Airport, in what was then Sudan but is now South Sudan, following an engine failure.
- In December 2009, a 748 Air Services British Aerospace 748-398 Srs. 2B, registration 5Y-YKM, was damaged when it suffered a runway excursion at Tonj Airport, in what was then Sudan but is now South Sudan. One of the occupants was killed, though he was alive after the plane came to a halt. A woman on the ground fainted and suffered minor injuries.
- On 17 February 2014, a 748 Air Services British Aerospace 748-371 Srs. 2B, registration 5Y-HAJ, was damaged beyond repair operating a domestic humanitarian aid cargo flight on behalf of the International Organization for Migration from Juba in South Sudan to Bentiu during the South Sudanese conflict. The aircraft landed at Bentiu Airport, veered off the runway and travelled across a ditch, then its wing hit two parked vehicles. One member of the aircraft's crew died and the other three were injured.
