= Ager Gum =

Military leader and song composer from Sudan (1941–1996)

- Born: 1941; Dinkaland
- Died: 1996 (aged 54–55)
- Military career
- Allegiance: Sudan
- Branch: Army
- Rank: General
- Unit: Sudan People's Liberation Army

Ager Gum (1941–1996) was a military leader and song composer from Sudan. She was an army general of the Sudan People's Liberation Army group, now the official army of the country of South Sudan.

She was known to be an active member of the infamous female SPLA battalion "Katifa banat" that fought during the Sudanese Civil war against the Khartoum government.

== Biography ==
Ager Gum was born in Dinkaland in the Sudan in 1941 at time when North and South Sudan were still one country. She was born in Nyang in present-day South Sudan to a mother from the Yibel tribe. After three failed marriages by the age of twenty-seven, Ager Gum left her Dinka community to start a new life in the urban town of Rumbek, the capital of Lakes State, central South Sudan, and the former capital of the country. While she was in Rumbek, she started composing songs about unsuccessful marriages in her community. The themes of her compositions were mainly directed toward men, who she said "want sex rather than real relationships". She joined the South Sudanese liberation movement against the north in 1968 and rose to become a general with the Sudan People's Liberation Army after going to war alongside men.
