= Tonj Airport =

- IATA: none; ICAO: HSTO

Summary
- Airport type: Public, Civilian
- Owner: Civil Aviation Authority of South Sudan
- Serves: Tonj, South Sudan
- Location: South Sudan
- Elevation AMSL: 431 m / 1,414 ft
- Coordinates: 07°15′58″N 028°39′45″E

Map
- Location of airport in South Sudan

Runways
Direction	Length		Surface
Direction	ft	m	Surface
16/34			Unpaved

Tonj Airport (ICAO: HSTO) is an airport serving Tonj in South Sudan. It is located in Tonj South County in Warrap State, in the town of Tonj, in the Bahr el Ghazal region of South Sudan. The airport is just outside town to the west of the central business district.

This location lies approximately 420 kilometres (260 mi), by air, northwest of Juba International Airport, the largest airport in South Sudan. The geographic coordinates of this airport are: 7° 15' 59.89"N, 28° 39' 44.35"E (Latitude: 7.266639; Longitude: 28.662322). Tonj Airport is situated 431 metres (1,414 ft) above sea level. The airport has a single unpaved runway, the dimensions of which are not publicly known at this time.

== Overview ==
Tonj Airport is a small civilian that serves the town of Tonj and surrounding communities. The airport does not yet receive regular scheduled airline service.

== Accidents ==
On 20 December 2009, a turboprop British Aerospace BAe-748-398, with four crew members and 37 passengers, registration 5Y-YKM, operated by 748 Air Services, overshot the runway while landing, striking a cluster of houses and killing a woman and her child on the ground. None of the occupants were injured but the plane was damaged beyond repair and was written off.

== See also ==
- Tonj
- Warrap (state)
- Bahr el Ghazal
- List of airports in South Sudan
