= Albino Bol =

South Sudanese politician

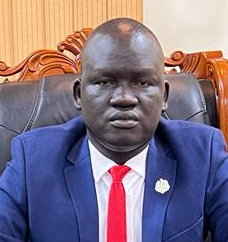
A portrait of Dr. Albino Bol. Photo: Woja Emmanuel

Dr. Albino Bol Dhieu is a South Sudanese politician and former Minister of Youth and Sports in South Sudan from 12 March 2020, until November 2023.He is a member of the Sudan People's Liberation Movement.

== Early life and education ==
Albino Bol was born in Northern Bahr el Ghazal State in a village called Ariek Riak about 5 kilometers east of Aweil town to Mr. Dhieu Bol Man and Mrs. Aluel Akol Malual.

He started his education in 1993 at Aweil El-Medina Primary School up to 1997 before he left for Khartoum while already in primary four. In 1998 he then went to Abubaker Sidiq Primary School for boys in Jabra City south of Khartoum where he finished his primary school in 2001. In 2002 he joined Khartoum El-Jadida Modern Secondary School for boys to 2006 and completed Sudan School Certificate.

In 2007, Bol was then admitted to the University of Juba School of Medicine and graduated in 2014 with a bachelor of surgery and medicine.

== Political career ==
During his school time Albino Bol was a SPLM students league activist where he participated in and spearheaded youth forums and engagements.

In 2007 he was first elected as the spokesperson of University of Juba college association, a position he held up to 2008. Then from 2009 to 2010 he was elected to Juba University Students Union as Spokesperson and Secretary of Information.

After graduating in 2014 he continued with his rallies until he became the first elected President of the Youth Union during the first convention of South Sudan National Union and event conducted at the Freedom Hall in Juba on 27 March 2015 up to March 2019 spending four years in office.

In March 2019 Bol was appointed as the National Minister of Youth and Sports.

In November 2023 President Kiir made changes to his cabinet and dismissed Bol as Minister. No formal reason was given for the dismissal.

== Political directives ==
Albino Bol Dhieu issued a suspension letter to Gola Boyoi Gola, Chairperson of South Sudan National Youth Union, after social media circulated two letters allegedly written to the president of Egypt and the Deputy President of the Sudan Sovereign Council.
