= Tonj =

Tonj Kalkuel
- City
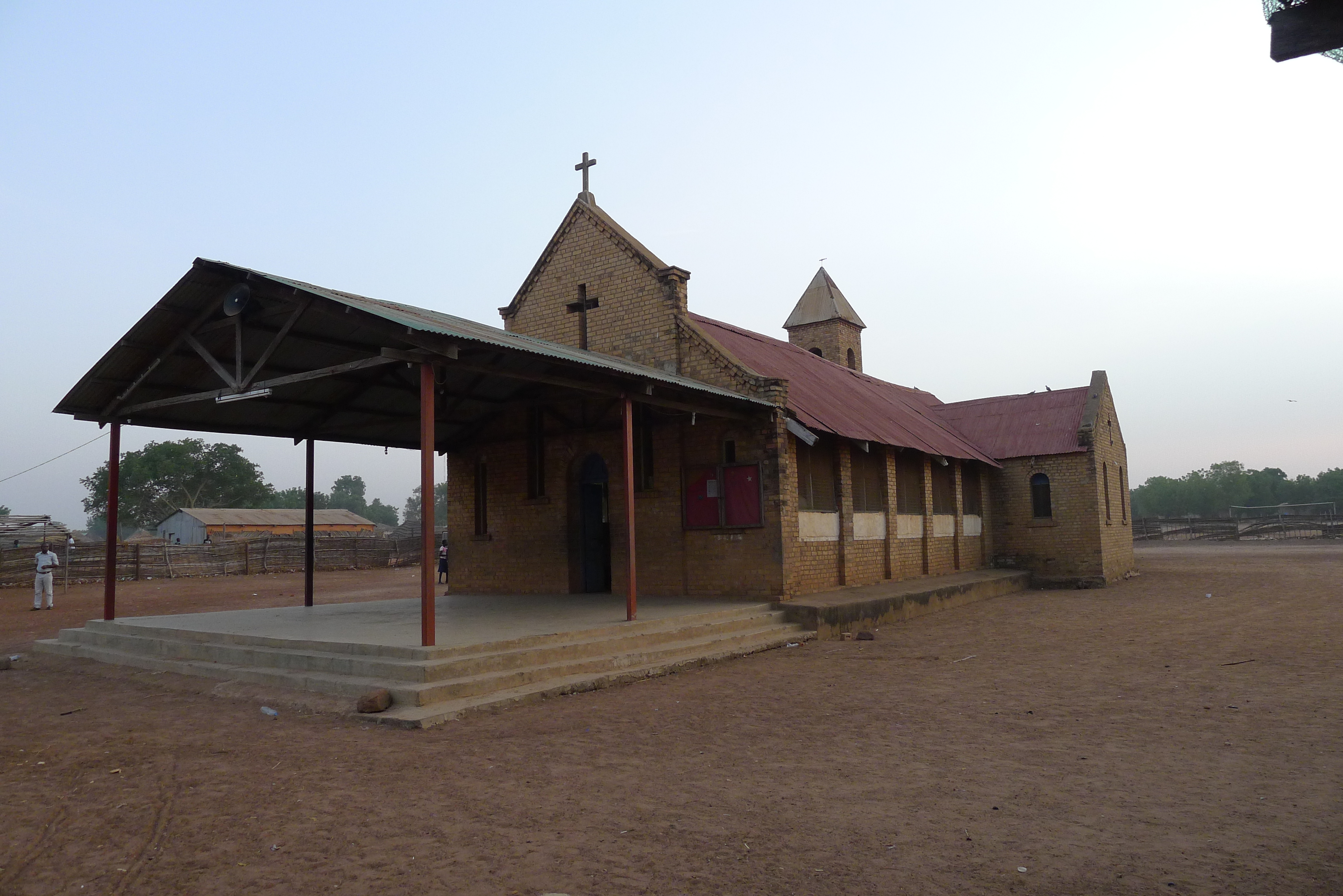
- A Catholic church in Tonj
- Nickname: Gen-ngeu
- Location in South Sudan
- Coordinates: 07°16′48″N 28°40′48″E
- Country: South Sudan
- Region: Bahr el Ghazal
- State: Warrap State
- County: Tonj South County

Government
  - Type: Local Government
- Elevation: 1,401 ft (427 m)

Population (2010 Estimate)
  - Total: 17,340 people
- Time zone: UTC+3 (EAT)

Tonj is a town located in Warrap State, in the Bahr el Ghazal region of South Sudan. It is known by various names, including Kalkuel, Genanyuon, Jurkatac, Madiera, Genngeu, and Tonjdit. The town is bordered by Rumbek, Cueibet, Yambio, Bentiu, and Gogrial. As of 2010, its population is 17,340.

== History and economy ==
Tonj is one of the largest towns in Warrap and the oldest town in South Sudan, home to various tribes such as Dinka, Bongo, and Luo people. The town is divided into three counties—Tonj North, Tonj South, and Tonj East - and has undergone further subdivisions.

Tonj was under the jurisdiction of the Jur River (Luo River) during the colonial period of British rule. During the Second World War, Tonj served as an area of economic strength for the British Empire in Africa. The British government built the first colonial school in South Sudan, called Princes School, in Tonj in 1944 as a gift to the Jur River (Luo River) chiefs who contributed smoked meat for ally forces during the war in North Africa. This school was headed by Eric Daniel, also known as Makerdit. Additionally, Tonj District was reported to have provided significant support to the British Empire through food logistics. Thousands of bulls and cows were collected from the area to be sent to the war front.

Tonj has produced many leaders during the colonial period and after the independence of Sudan and South Sudan, such as William Deng Nhial, Dr. John Garang De Mabior, and Omer Hassien Bashir, who have studied in some of the schools in the town. The town is also ranked as one of the oldest and most historical cities in South Sudan.

An influential politician from Tonj District, Veteran William Deng Nhial, was among the first ideological South Sudanese intellectuals to have argued for South Sudan's right to freedom. In 1996, when the Arab-based government wanted to create a state for the Gogrial and Tonj Communities, they called it Warrap State. Warrap is another small urban center within Tonj Region, and the capital was to be located in Warrap.

Tonj Region was a very large constituency out of which Gogrial emerged, and Abyei Region before 1905 was part of its administration. In the early and late 1990s, the SPLM/A movement fighting the Khartoum regime was in the Tonj Region, around the areas of Thiet, Yinhkuel, Ngabagook, and Mayom Abun. Tonj and Rumbek were used during the war as logistics centers in the fight against the Arabs.

Dinka (Muonyjang) communities across South Sudan are well-versed in Wanhalel Dinka Customary Laws (Ganuun Wanhalel); all those laws that are now used to govern Dinka Communities were first drafted and formulated in Wanhalel, Tonj South.

Economically, Kalkuel is a very rich region. It has plenty of oil underground waiting to be exploited for the benefit of the general South Sudanese, and most of the swampy areas fall within this region between them and Unity State. Toich areas extend from the Konggor area, Lou Ariik, Apuk Padoc, Lou Paher, Thony Amoun Marol, and Luanyjang swampy areas. Tuony also keeps a lot of cattle.

== Political participation ==
When war broke out in 2013, the people of Tonj participated in bringing peace back to South Sudan and defended the constitution and the sovereignty.

1. Mayiik Ayii Deng

2. Awut Deng Acuil

3. Nhial Deng Nhial

4. Gen. Akol Koor Kuc

5. Gen. Alieu Ayieny Alieu

6. Gen. Bol Akot Bol

7. Gen. Magok Magok Deng

== Notable people that have affiliated with Tonj ==
=== John Lee Tae-seok ===
South Korean Fr. John Lee Tae-seok worked as a Catholic missionary, priest, doctor, teacher, and mentor to the people of Tonj. He worked at the leper colony. Lee Tae-seok was responsible for the introduction of a school, the Don Bosco Hospital, as well as forming the nation's first brass band which brought fame to the town. In memory of Lee Tae-seok, who died of cancer in 2010, the Korean TV network KBS and the South Sudanese government are working on a joint project called "Smile, Tonj" to rebuild Tonj.

=== Emmanuel Jal ===
Musician, actor and activist Emanuel Jal was born in Tonj.

=== James Thuch Madhier ===
Humanitarian James Thuch Madhier was born in Tonj.

=== Thomas Taban Akot ===
Medical Doctor, Thomas Taban Akot.

== Education ==
Tonj has continued to send its children to school but still faces limited access to education, especially in rural areas. Notable Tonj schools include Don Bosco Primary and Secondary Schools, Bakhita Primary and Secondary Schools, and Makerdit Primary School, among others. Some of the few Tonj students that shocked South Sudan and East Africa, include:

Tito Yak Kuol shocked Kenya in both Kenyan Primary and Secondary Leaving Examinations. Tito Yak attended Harvard College, making him the first south Sudanese to have gone to Harvard College.

Emmanuel Malou Deng shocked South Sudanese with his unparalleled performance in the South Sudan Secondary National Examinations by being the fifth best student countrywide. Emmanuel has gone on to attend Columbia College (New York).

Mary Nyanbul Gum shocked both Sudanese, South Sudanese, and Tuony by being the first female South Sudanese to occupy the second position in the entire Sudan in the 2013 Sudan School Certificate of Secondary Education. Nyanbul went on to attend Brown University, graduating in 2020.

Albino Akol Atem also made a record in the Sudan School Certificate of Secondary Education by being the tenth best in the entire Sudan. He has gone to study at the University of Juba, a premier University in South Sudan.

== Transport ==
Three main roads lead out of Tonj:

- A43-North leads northwest to Wau, South Sudan
- A43-South leads southeast to Rumbek
- A smaller road leads directly north to merge with the Yirol-Yoynyang Road at Thar Jath
- The town is also served by Tonj Airport

== Subsections of Tonj ==
Tonj is inhabited by two tribes, the Bongo and the Dinka. Dinka is divided into the following communities:

=== Tonj East County ===
- Luac-jang
- Akook
- Thiik
- Luac-koth
- Jal-wau (Kong-ngor, Ador, Bac, and Pakor)

=== Tonj South County ===
- Bongo
- Muok
- Yar
- Thony
- Apuk Jurwiir
- JurLuel

=== Tonj North County ===
- Lou Mawien Ariik
- Apuk Padoc
- Konggor
- Awan Parek (Awan, Jur-Bol, Jur-Lian)
- Lou Paher
- Noi
- Atok
- Abiem
- Abuok
- Leer (Ajak and Kuac)
- Nyang Akoch

== See also ==
- Tonj Airport
- Warrap (state)
- Bahr el Ghazal
