= Duar =

- Location in South Sudan
- Coordinates: 8.772291°N 30.12434°E
- Country: South Sudan
- Region: Greater Upper Nile
- State: Unity State
- County: Guit County
- Time zone: UTC+2 (CAT)

Duar is a large village in the Guit County of Unity State, in the Greater Upper Nile region of South Sudan. It is on the main oil road leading south from Bentiu, and is close to the Thar Jath Central Processing Facility in the Block 5A oil concession.

The village is in a Jikany Nuer region. A clinic operated by Médecins Sans Frontières was established in the village in 1989 by Dr. Jill Seaman to treat patients with visceral leishmaniasis. The disease was spreading quickly, in part due to civil war, which was causing population movement, reducing resistance through malnutrition and hindering provision of control and treatment. On 27 June 1998 Duar was attacked by Paulino Matiep's SSUM militia. The Medecins Sans Frontieres compound was burned and destroyed, as were the school and the community offices. Paulino's forces raided cattle camps, killing the animals for food. About 25% of the population fled, some to islands in the Nile where they felt they would be safe.

After the civil war, a divisional headquarters for the Sudanese Peoples Liberation Army was constructed by Arkel International in Duar. The site was in a swamp near to the Nile, and had to be raised above flood level. 3,000 truck loads of fill material were brought in from two quarries about 150 kilometres (93 mi) distant, a difficult task due to poor road quality and north–south political tensions. The 2,500 square metres (27,000 sq ft) facility is self-contained, with a 3 megawatt power plant.
