= Arkel International =

US-based private construction company

- Type: Private
- Founded: 1954; 72 years ago
- Headquarters: Baton Rouge, Louisiana, U.S.
- Area served: Worldwide
- Key people: Mr. George Knost (president); John Moore (CEO)

Arkel International is an American privately held construction firm based in Baton Rouge, Louisiana, United States. The company serves organizations, governments, and militaries.In 2008 Arkel had about 300 employees and $85 million in annual sales.

== Foundation and expansion ==
The company was founded in 1954, at first undertaking construction of chemical and refinery complexes in the Mississippi River valley. It then expanded into other parts of the United States, and then internationally. Although Arkel is diverse, Arkel International specializes in construction in challenging environments, building secure facilities with self-contained power supplies.

== Sugar refineries ==
Arkel's first overseas project was a large sugar refinery in Sudan. The Kenana project was huge, involving a 40-megawatt power station, conduits, canals pumping stations, crushers and so on, and ended up costing $613 million. In 1974 it was awarded to Lonrho, but after cost overruns in 1977 the management contract was awarded to Arkel. Arkel won a government contract in Kenya for an overhaul and expansion of Nzoia Sugar Company in 1988. The project was troubled, with delays and cost overruns, and eventually a review committee recommended cancellation.

== Other contracts ==
A joint venture with a Sudanese investor, Arkel-Talab Cargo Services, provided air transport in the Sudan in the 1980s. They had supported Chevron Corporation until that company withdrew from oil exploration in Sudan in 1984. They were being considered in 1986 as a contractor to the U.S. government to deliver emergency supplies. In March 1986 Arkel was awarded a contract worth almost $6 million by the U.S. Army Corps of Engineers to build facilities for the Sudan Air Force. With a civil war in progress in the south, it was difficult to get materials to the construction site, and the project ran into a series of delays. As Arkel was finishing the job they got involved in a legal dispute with a subcontractor. Two of Arkel's employees were then arrested, common practice in Sudan legal disputes, but later released.

Arkel became a contractor to the U.S. Government in 2003. Projects in this role were to provide construction services in conflict, post-conflict and remote, underdeveloped regions of the world. The projects included integrated logistics and critical power solutions. In April 2006 Arkel won a contract from the U.S. Department of Homeland Security for maintenance and deactivation of manufactured homes and travel trailers. The contract was worth up to $100 million. These units are for use in disaster relief situations such as the aftermath of Hurricane Katrina. In 2009, the company was a member of the International Stability Operations Association, which supports the private military industry. In April 2010 the company won a $6.4 million contract to supply 16 pre-engineered buildings, with electrical power and force protection barriers, to Camp Leatherneck in Helmand Province, Afghanistan.
