= Boma State =

State of South Sudan from 2015 to 2020

Boma
- State of South Sudan
- Location of Boma in South Sudan
- Country: South Sudan
- Counties: 2: Pibor; Pochalla
- Capital: Pibor

Government
  - Governor: Baba Medan Konya (first); David Yau Yau (last)

Area
  - Total: 41,654 km^{2} (16,083 sq mi)

Population (2008 census)
  - Total: 214,676
  - Density: 5.1538/km^{2} (13.348/sq mi)
- Time zone: UTC+3
  - Summer (DST): not observed

Boma State was a state in South Sudan that existed between 2 October 2015 and 22 February 2020. It was located in the Greater Upper Nile region and was formerly part of the state of Jonglei. The state bordered Akobo State, Imatong State, Jonglei State, Kapoeta State, Bieh State, Terekeka State and the country of Ethiopia to the east.

== History ==
Before Boma State was created on 2 October 2015, the area existed as a special administrative unit under called Greater Pibor Administrative Area (GPAA) which is headed by a Chief Administrator whose status is like that of state Governor. This came in an attempt to end the conflict that devastated Jonglei State for three years. The fighter demanded autonomy from Jonglei State government which marginalized the minorities such Murle, Anyuak, Jie and Kachipo.

On 2 October 2015, President Salva Kiir issued a decree establishing 28 states in place of the 10 constitutionally established states. The decree established the new states largely along ethnic lines. A number of opposition parties and civil society groups challenged the constitutionality of the decree. Kiir later resolved to take it to parliament for approval as a constitutional amendment. In November the South Sudanese parliament empowered President Kiir to create new states.

Baba Medan Konya was appointed as the Governor for Boma State on 24 December 2015. In February 2018, David Yau Yau became the state's governor. The state was dissolved in 2020.

== Geography ==
Boma State was located in the Greater Upper Nile region and it bordered the states of Akobo to the northwest, Imatong to the southwest, Kapoeta to the southeast, Jonglei to the west, and the country of Ethiopia to the east.

It host Boma National Park, one of the largest national parks in Africa.

=== Administrative divisions ===
After Boma State was created, the state's seven greater counties under Greater Pibor Administrative Area (GPAA) were further split up into fourteen local government administrative units. GPAA was a special administrative status given to the two former Jonglei counties of Pibor and Pochalla as a result of peace accord between the central government and Gen. David Yauyau led South Sudan Democratic Movement/Army, Cobra Faction in 2014. Under GPAA the number of counties were raised to seven; namely Pochalla North, Pochalla South, Pibor, Lekuangole, Gumuruk, Jebel Boma and Vertet.

The fourteen counties of the former Boma State were the following:

- Pibor North, Pibor South, Vertet, Liloth, Lilibok, Gumuruk, Lotila and Jebel Boma Counties (all carved out of Pibor County)
- and Pochalla, Adongo, Awetaballa, Burator and Otegu Counties (all carved out of Pochalla County)

There were seven sub counties in the state. Those sub counties were expected to either be upgraded into separate counties or demoted to return under the existing counties.

=== Towns and cities ===
The capital of the state was Pibor, South Sudan. The population of Pibor was estimated at less than 1,000 people in 2011. Another in the state of Boma include Pochalla, South Sudan, which lies directly on the border with Ethiopia. The town is about 470 kilometers (290 miles) from Juba via road.
