= Aweil Airport =

- IATA: n/a; ICAO: HSAW

Summary
- Airport type: Public, Civilian
- Owner: Civil Aviation Authority of South Sudan
- Serves: Aweil, South Sudan
- Location: Aweil, South Sudan
- Elevation AMSL: 1,394 ft (425 m)
- Coordinates: 08°47′35″N 027°21′37″E

Map
- Location of Aweil Airport in South Sudan

Runways
Direction	Length		Surface
Direction	ft	m	Surface
18/36	6,561 (est.)	2,000 (est.)	Unpaved

Aweil Airport is an airport serving the town of Aweil, in South Sudan.

== Location ==
Aweil Airport (IATA: n/a, ICAO: HSAW) is located in Aweil Central County in Aweil State, in the town of Aweil, near the international border with the Republic of Sudan and the border with Abyei Region. The airport was formerly located downtown, within the central business district of Aweil. In 2011, this facility was closed and a new airport northwest of Aweil opened. The new airport is located approximately 5.5 kilometres (3.4 mi) from both Aweil and the town of Malweil.

This location lies approximately 640 kilometres (400 mi), by air, northwest of Juba International Airport, the largest airport in South Sudan. The geographic coordinates of this airport are: 8° 47' 35.73"N, 27° 21' 37.82"E (Latitude: 8.793261; Longitude: 27.360506). Aweil Airport sits at an elevation of 425 metres (1,394 ft) above sea level. The airport has a single unpaved runway with an estimated length of 2,000 metres (6,600 ft).

== Overview ==
Aweil Airport is a small civilian airport that serves the town of Aweil and surrounding communities. Southern Star Airlines provided scheduled air service on Wednesdays and Sundays to Juba until their bankruptcy in 2012.

== See also ==
- Aweil
- Northern Bahr el Ghazal
- Bahr el Ghazal
- List of airports in South Sudan
