= Paloich Airport =

Airport in South Sudan

Paloich Tyr Airport, Heliport
- IATA: (HGI); ICAO: HSFA

Summary
- Airport type: Public, Civilian
- Owner: Dar Petroleum Operating Company DPOC
- Operator: DPOC
- Serves: Palogue oil field, South Sudan
- Elevation AMSL: 1,270 ft / 385.741 m
- Coordinates: 10.529°N 32.501°E

Map
- Location of airport in South Sudan

Runways
Direction	Length		Surface
Direction	m	ft	Surface
01/19	2,500	8,202	Asphalt

Paloich Airport, Heliport (also Palogue, Palouge Paloug, Paluge) is the airport in the Melut County of Upper Nile State in South Sudan which provides transport operations for the adjacent Palogue oil field and the settlement Paloich.

== See also ==
- List of airports in South Sudan
