= Gwangju Catholic University =

University in South Korea

Coordinates: 35.0161°N 126.8646°E

- Hangul: 광주가톨릭대학교
- Hanja: 光州가톨릭大學校
- RR: Gwangju Gatollik daehakgyo
- MR: Kwangju Kat'ollik taehakkyo

Gwangju Catholic University (Korean: 광주가톨릭대학교) is a Catholic seminary located in Naju (near Gwangju), South Korea.
