= Golden Wings Charters =

Charter airline based in Nassau, Bahamas

Golden Wings Charter

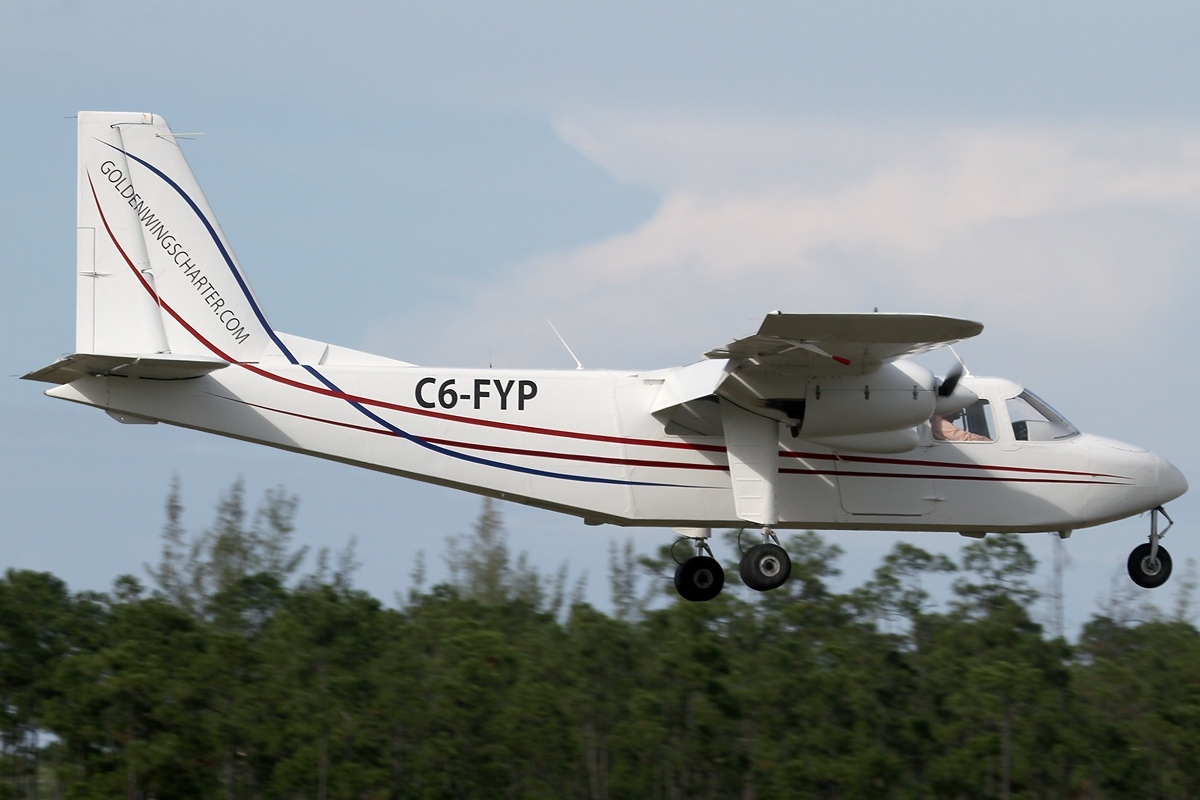
- Golden Wings Charters Britten-Norman BN-2 Islander at Nassau Airport
IATA	ICAO	Call sign
-	-	-
- Founded: 2002
- Fleet size: See Fleet Information below
- Headquarters: Nassau, Bahamas

Golden Wings Charter is an Air Charter airline based in Nassau, Bahamas.

== Fleet Information ==
- 1 - Piper PA-31 Navajo
- 2 - Piper Aztec
