= Aircraft Leasing Services =

Kenyan airline

ALS – Aircraft Leasing Services
IATA	ICAO	Call sign
K4	–	–
- Hubs: Wilson Airport
- Fleet size: 25
- Headquarters: Nairobi, Kenya
- Employees: 200+
- Website: als.co.ke

ALS – Aircraft Leasing Services is a regional airline based in Nairobi, Kenya.

== History ==
ALS started operations in 1985 with a single two-seat Cessna 150 which was initially leased out to a flying school; and has seen steady growth ever since.

== Fleet ==
=== Current fleet ===
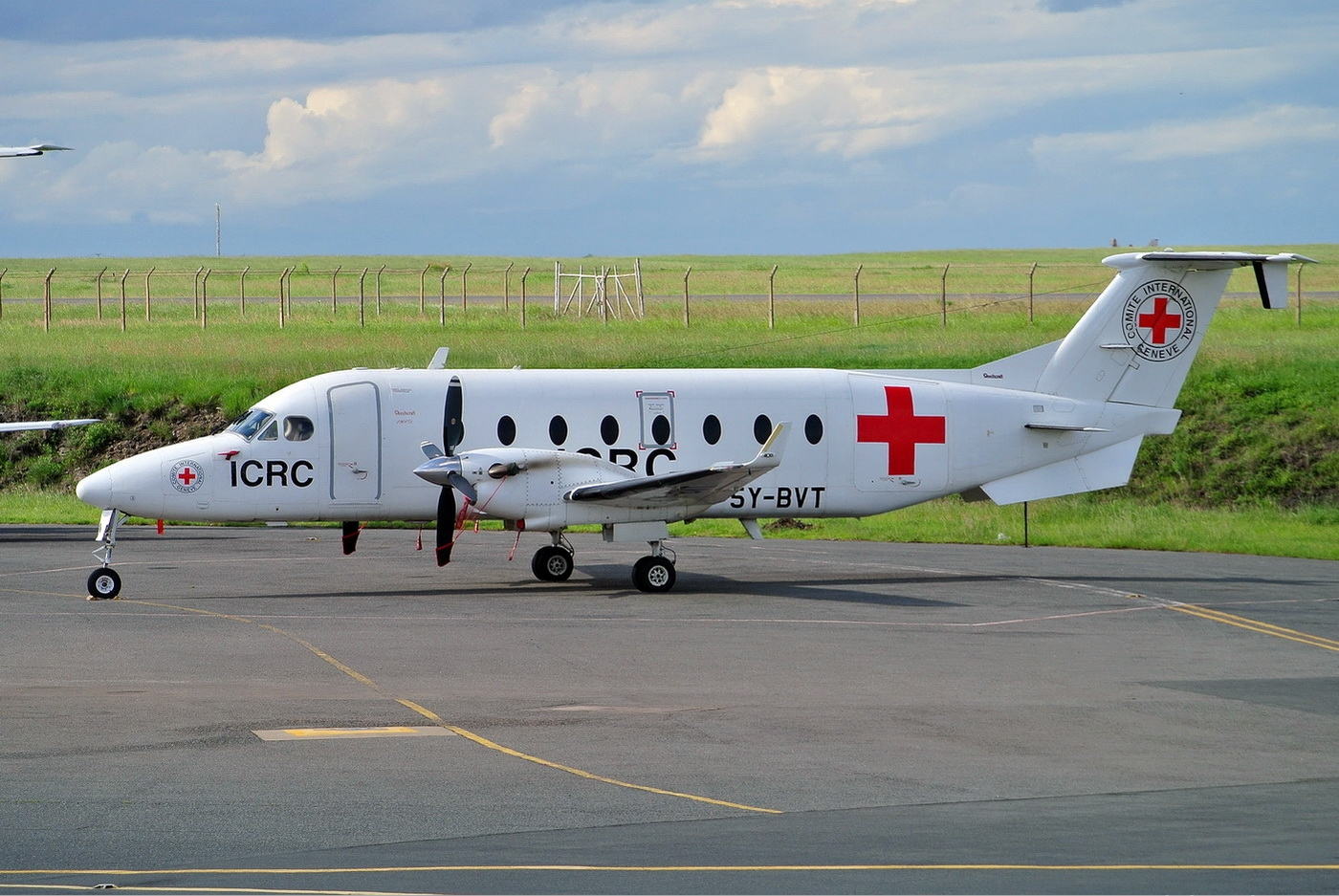
Beech 1900D of ALS leased to the International Committee of the Red Cross, at Jomo Kenyatta International Airport, 2012.

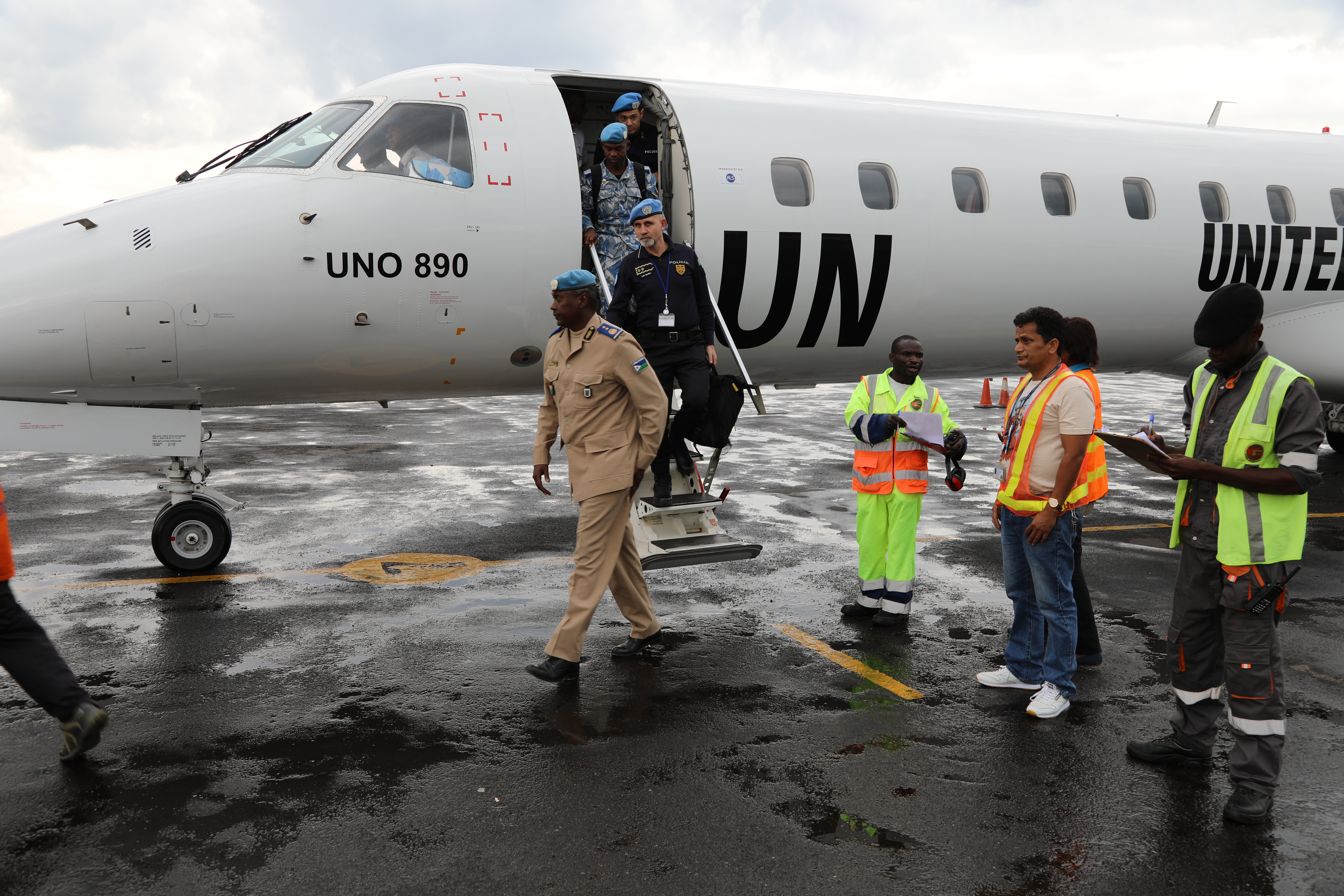
ERJ145 of ALS leased to the MONUSCO, at Goma Airport, 2018.

The ALS-Aircraft Leasing Services fleet consists of the following aircraft (as of August 2017):

ALS-Aircraft Leasing Services fleet
Aircraft	In service	Orders	Passengers	Notes
Beechcraft 1900D	4	—		(as of July 2026)
Bombardier Dash 8-100	11	—		(as of July 2026)
De Havilland Canada DHC-8-Q200	2	—		(as of July 2026)
De Havilland Canada DHC-8-300	3	—		(as of July 2026)
Embraer ERJ 135LR	1	—		(as of July 2026)
Embraer ERJ 145	6	—		(as of July 2026)
Cessna 208 Caravan	3	—		
Cessna 172	2	—		
Total	27			

== Former fleet ==
The ALS – Aircraft Leasing Services fleet include the following aircraft (as of 31 March 2020):

- 2 Embraer ERJ 135
- 6 Embraer ERJ 145
- 8 Bombardier Dash 8 100
- 1 Bombardier Dash 8 200
- 5 Beechcraft 1900D
- 1 Beechcraft 1900C
- 2 Cessna 208B Grand Caravan
