= Pibor =

Pibor Pibor Pibor Post
- Town
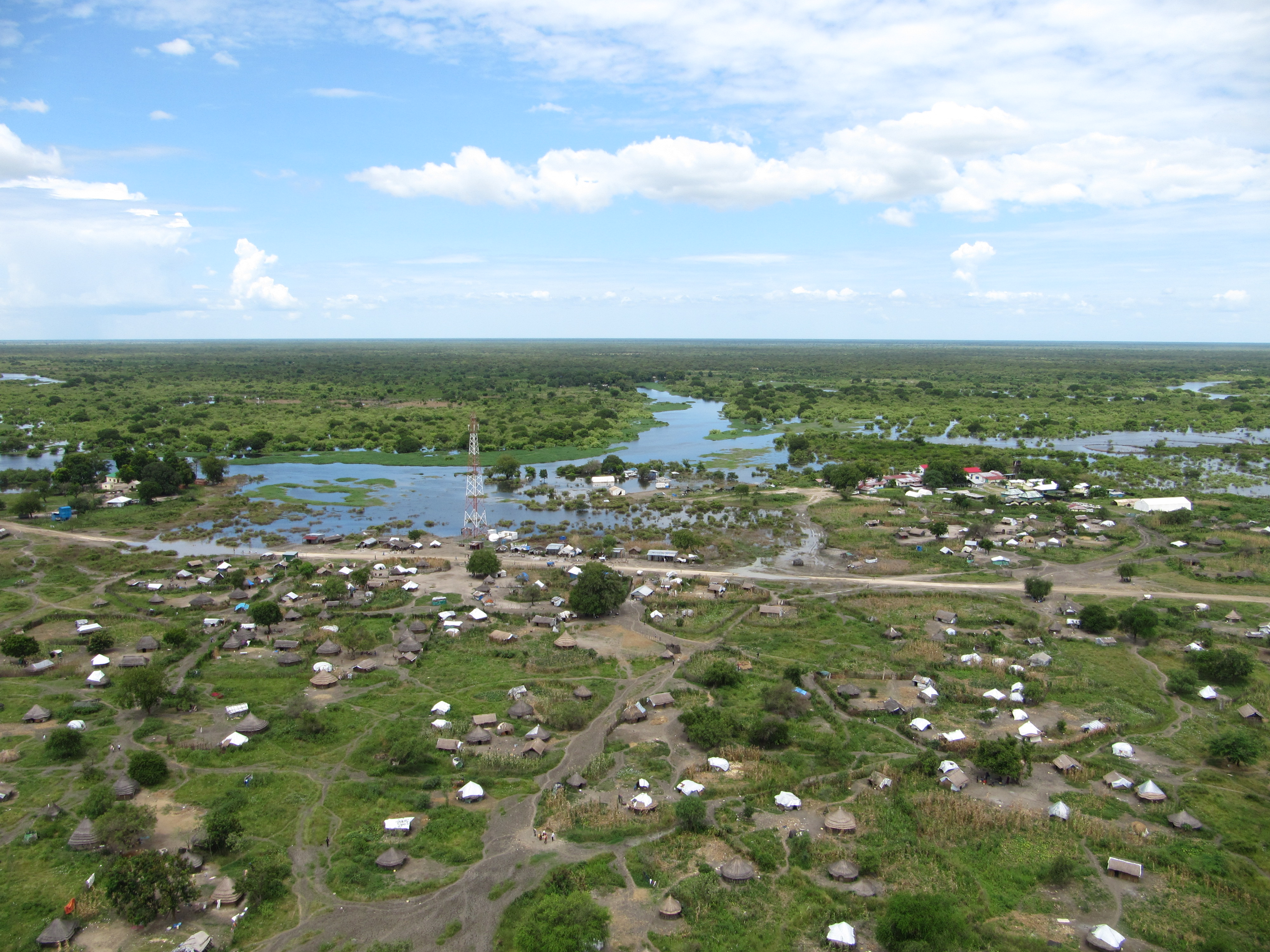
- Pibor Post, 2012
- Nickname: Gogolthin
- Location within South Sudan
- Coordinates: 06°48′00″N 33°08′00″E
- Country: South Sudan
- State: Pibor Administrative Area
- County: Pibor County

Population (2011 Estimate)
  - Total: 1,000
- Time zone: UTC+2 (CAT)
- Climate: Aw

Pibor, also called Pibor Post, is a town in eastern South Sudan.

== Location ==
Pibor is located in Pibor County, in Pibor Administrative Area, in eastern South Sudan, near the border with Ethiopia. It lies approximately 342 kilometres (213 mi), by road, northeast of Juba, the capital and largest city of the country. After creation of new states, it became part of Boma State.

== Overview ==
Pibor or Pibor Post was a colonial era outpost built in 1912 by the British and was originally called Fort Bruce. The town served as the headquarters of Pibor County before the emergence of Greater Pibor Administrative Area/GPAA in 2014 after the Cobra fighting with the government of South Sudan. It was one of the constituent counties of the Jonglei State before creation of new states in 2015, including Greater Pibor Administrative Area and the defunct Boma State. The Pibor River, formed by the confluence of several smaller streams, begins its journey at Pibor. The river then flows north, receiving the Akobo River near Akobo. Eventually, after receiving the Gilo River and the Bela River, it joins the Baro River to form the Sobat River.

== Transport ==
A packed-mud road leads north to Akobo at the border with Ethiopia. Another packed-mud road leads southwest out of Pibor to the town of Bor. These roads become unusable due to flooding during the later months of the annual rainy season. Locals may move by foot, or by river when the roads are not usable. The town is also served by Pibor Airport.

== Population ==
As of July 2011, it is estimated that the permanent population of Pibor Post is 1,000 people or fewer, although the data is unclear as the population is largely pastoral and few records are kept.

== Points of interest ==
Boma National Park, the largest national park in South Sudan, lies about 65 kilometres (40 mi), by road, east of Pibor Post.

== See also ==
- Pibor Airport
- Jonglei
- Greater Upper Nile
