= Pochalla =

- Location in South Sudan
- Coordinates: 07°10′48″N 34°06′00″E
- Country: South Sudan
- State: Pibor Administrative Area
- County: Pochalla County
- Time zone: UTC+2 (CAT)
- Climate: Aw

Pochalla (also Pochala, Pochella, Pachella) is a town in Pochalla County, Boma State, eastern South Sudan, on the international border with Ethiopia. The town sits on the eastern edge of Boma National Park. This location lies approximately 470 kilometres (290 mi), by road, northeast of Juba, the capital and largest city in South Sudan.

== History ==
During the Second Sudanese Civil War (1983 - 2005), Pochalla witnessed many atrocities and tragedies, as did most South Sudanese towns. The town and surrounding communities was home to the Anyuak of South Sudan.

In January 2004, there were reports of Anuak refugees arriving at Pochalla who had fled southwestern Ethiopia as a consequence of the violent clashes between "highlanders" (Ethiopians originating from outside the Gambela Region) and Anyuak that had erupted in and around Gambela after the killing of eight Ethiopian Government refugee camp officials on 13 December 2003.

== Transport ==
The town is served by Pochalla Airport. The road network around Pochalla is very rudimentary.

== In popular culture ==
Pochalla is a destination for the many South Sudanese who are chronicled in the nonfiction book "Lost Boy, Lost Girl: Escaping Civil War in Sudan."
