= Greater Pibor Administrative Area =

Administrative area in South Sudan

Greater Pibor Administrative Area Boma
- Administrative area
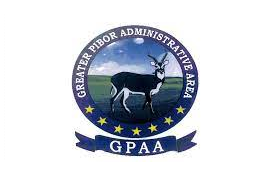
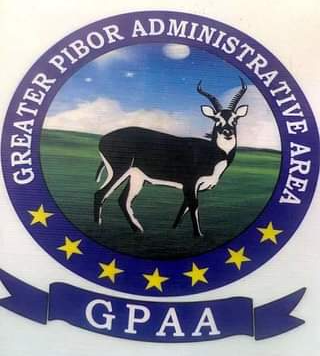
- Flag Seal

- Greater Pibor in South Sudan
- Country: South Sudan
- Region: Greater Upper Nile
- Capital: Pibor

Government
  - Chief Administrator: Gola Boyoi Gola

Area
  - Total: 41,962 km^{2} (16,202 sq mi)

Population
  - Total: 237,649
- Time zone: UTC+2 (CAT)

The Greater Pibor Administrative Area is an administrative area in South Sudan.

== History ==
From the beginning of South Sudanese independence, the Anyuak, Jie, Kachepo, and Murle people in Jonglei sought greater autonomy from the Jonglei State government dominated by Nuer and Dinka. The resulting armed insurrections against the Government of South Sudan, initially dispersed, coalesced into the South Sudan Democratic Movement/Army (SSDM/A), which in turn was ultimately dominated by David Yau Yau and his Cobra Faction. Peace negotiations in the spring of 2014 led to a compromise that carved out two counties of Pibor and Pochalla within Jonglei state to create the new semi-autonomous Greater Pibor Administrative Area (GPAA).

The special administrative area was dissolved after the creation of Boma State in 2015.

As a result of a peace agreement signed in February 2020, Boma State was dissolved and Pibor was reconstituted as a special administrative area.

== Towns and cities ==
The capital of the state is Pibor. The population of Pibor was estimated at 148,475 people in 2008. The town of Pochalla in Pochalla County lies directly on the border with Ethiopia. The town is about 470 kilometers (290 miles) from Juba via road.

== Counties ==
Greater Pibor Administrative Area comprises six counties:

- Boma County
- Gumuruk County
- Lekwangolei County
- Pibor County
- Pochalla County
- Verteth County

== Chief Administrators ==
Tenure	Incumbent	Party
31 August 2005 – 30 December 2005	Akot Maze	SPLM
30 December 2005 – 21 May 2011	Akot Maze	SPLM
May 2011 – March 2013	Kuol Monyluak Dak	SPLM
February 2013 – June 2020	David Yau Yau	SPLM
June 2020 – July 2021	Joshua Konyi	
July 2021 – April 2024	Lokali Ame Bullen	
April 2024 – present	Gola Boyoi	
