= Pochalla County =

Coordinates: 7.1646°N 33.9258°E

Pochalla
- County
- Interactive map of Pochalla
- Country: South Sudan
- State: Greater Pibor Administrative Area
- Headquarters: Pochalla
- Time zone: UTC+2 (CAT)

Pochalla is a county in the Greater Pibor Administrative Area, South Sudan. The capital of the state, where the governor and state parliament is located, is in Bor town, which is situated on the Nile River at the western end of the state. Pochalla is to the extreme east of the state, located on the border with Ethiopia. Much of the County is sandwiched between two rivers, the Akobo, which forms the national boundary to the east, and the Oboth to the west. The dominant people group are the Anyuak who border the Murle to the west and the Nuer to the North, both of whom are cattle keeping tribes, who have a culture of raiding to increase their cattle numbers. To the east in Ethiopia, the Anuak have had tensions with the government, so communications are weak.

With the exception of a few administrators and soldiers in the barracks, the entire population of Pochalla County is made up of Anyuak. The Anuak are agricultural Nilotes, closely related to the Shilluk in the north and the Acholi, Alur and Luo to the south. Their culture and language is similar to the other agricultural Nilotes, but very different from the agropastoral Nilotes, the Dinka and Nuer. The Anyuak people group span the international boundary, and are recognised as being in both Ethiopia and South Sudan.

According to the 2008 Census, the total population of Pochalla County was 66,201. In addition to the local population, there are 3,662 Ethiopian refugees in Alari. These are almost all of the same Anuak ethnic group.
