= Paloich =

Coordinates: 10°27′28″N 32°32′40″E

Paloich refers to an area in the Melut County of Upper Nile State in the Greater Upper Nile region of South Sudan. It includes oil-related Paloich Airport (also spelled as Palouge Airport) and adjacent Palogue oil field.

The variations of the name of the place vary greatly and include: Paloich, Palogue, Palouge, Baloish, Paloug, Paluge, Phaloich, Phalogue, Phalouge, Baloish, Phaloug, Phaluge, Paloch and others.

There also seems to be a Paloich Market. and Palouge Power Plant.

== See also ==
- List of power stations in Sudan
