= Rumbek =

Town in Lakes State, South Sudan

- City
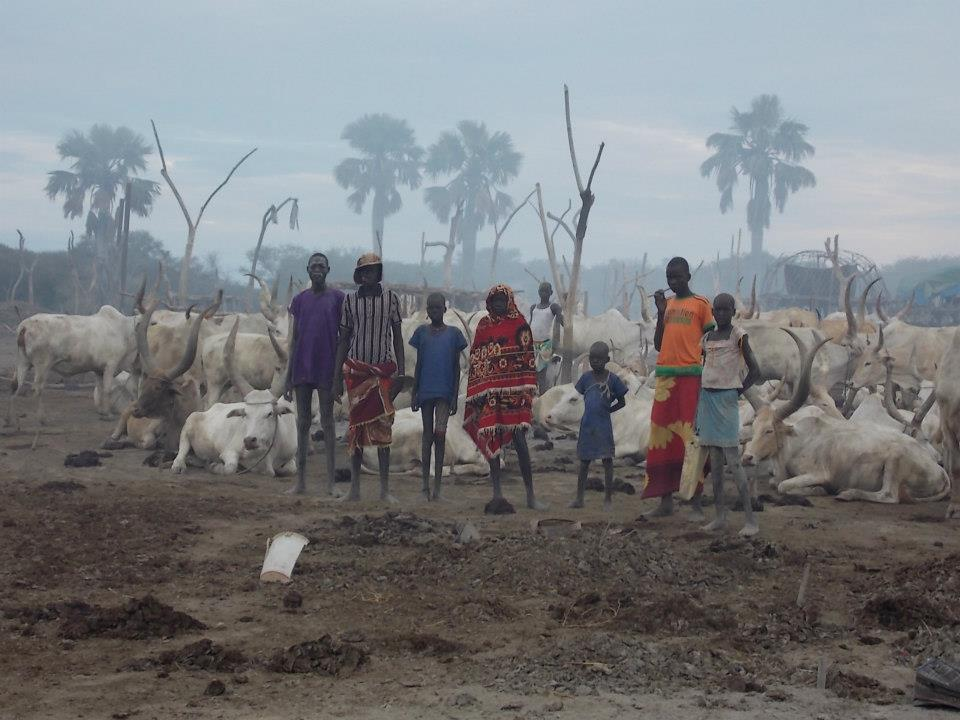
- A cattle camp in Rumbek

- Location in South Sudan
- Coordinates: 6.806°N 29.676°E
- Country: South Sudan
- Region: Bahr el Ghazal
- State: Lakes State
- County: Rumbek Centre County
- Founder: Alphonse de Malzac (1858)
- Elevation: 406 m (1,332 ft)

Population (2011)
  - Total: est. 32,100
- Time zone: UTC+2 (CAT)
- Climate: Aw

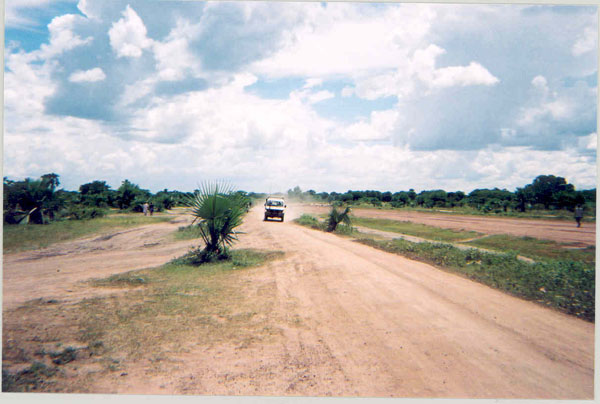
Road alongside Rumbek Airstrip

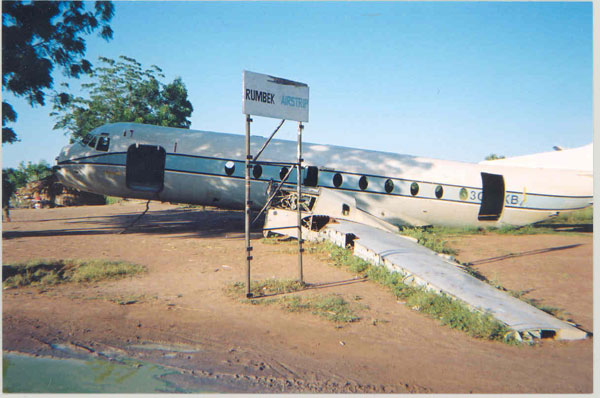

Rumbek (Arabic: رمبك) is the capital of Lakes State in the Bahr el Ghazal region of South Sudan. For a period from 2005, it also served as the administrative capital of the Southern Sudan Autonomous Region.

== Location ==
Rumbek is approximately 377 kilometres (234 mi) by road northwest of Juba, the capital and largest city in the country. Its coordinates are 6.81°N 29.68°E and its elevation is 420 metres (1,380 ft) above sea level.

== Overview ==
Rumbek is the headquarters of Rumbek Central County and is the capital of Lakes State, one of the 10 states of South Sudan. Following the peace agreement ending the Second Sudanese Civil War, the Sudanese People's Liberation Movement chose Rumbek to serve as the temporary administrative center of the Government of Southern Sudan. Later, Juba was selected to become the permanent capital. Like most South Sudanese towns, Rumbek suffered significant infrastructural damage during the civil war, in which an estimated 2 million people perished.

== Population ==
In 2004, the United Nations (OCHA) estimated the population of "Rumbek County" at about 82,500. At that time, the Dinka Agar constituted about 60% of the population, 30% were Dinka Gok, 6% were Bongo and 4% were Jur-Bel. In 2011, the population of the town of Rumbek is estimated at 32,100.

== Transportation ==
The town of Rumbek is situated on the main road (A43) from Juba to the southeast to Wau to the northwest. There are two smaller roads out of town; one to Yirol to the east and another to Durbuoni to the north. Since 2005, some of the roads have undergone repairs. Rumbek is also served by Rumbek Airport. Civicon Limited is the main construction contractor in Rumbek, working on both the roads and the airport.

== Climate ==
Like other parts of South Sudan and the East Sudanian savanna, Rumbek has a tropical savanna climate which borders on a hot semi-arid climate (Köppen Aw bordering on BSh), with a wet season and a dry season and the temperature being hot year-round. The average annual mean temperature is 27.8 °C (82.0 °F), the average annual high temperature is 34.5 °C (94.1 °F), while the average annual low temperature is 21.2 °C (70.2 °F). The hottest time of year is from February to May, just before the wet season starts. March is the hottest month, having the highest average high at 37.9 °C (100.2 °F), the highest mean at 30.5 °C (86.9 °F) and the highest average low at 23.2 °C (73.8 °F). August and July have the lowest average high and mean at 31.7 °C (89.1 °F) and 26.5 °C (79.7 °F), while December has the lowest average low at 18.5 °C (65.3 °F).

Rumbek receives 847.7 millimetres (33.37 in) of rain over 77.1 precipitation days, with a distinct wet and dry season like most tropical savanna climates. December receives no precipitation at all, with almost no rain falling from November to March. August, the wettest month, receives 159.7 millimetres (6.29 in) of rainfall on average. August also has 13.9 precipitation days, which is the most of any month. Humidity is much higher in the wet season than the dry season, with February having a humidity at just 31% and August having a humidity at 74%. Rumbek receives 2675.7 hours of sunshine annually on average, with the sunshine being distributed fairly evenly across the year, although it is lower during the wet season. January receives the most sunshine, while June receives the least.

Climate data for Rumbek (1961–1990)
Month	Jan	Feb	Mar	Apr	May	Jun	Jul	Aug	Sep	Oct	Nov	Dec	Year
Record high °C (°F)	40.3 (104.5)	42.8 (109.0)	43.3 (109.9)	42.2 (108.0)	41.1 (106.0)	38.2 (100.8)	40.0 (104.0)	36.7 (98.1)	37.0 (98.6)	39.5 (103.1)	38.5 (101.3)	39.1 (102.4)	43.3 (109.9)
Mean daily maximum °C (°F)	35.4 (95.7)	37.4 (99.3)	37.9 (100.2)	36.4 (97.5)	34.5 (94.1)	32.8 (91.0)	31.7 (89.1)	31.7 (89.1)	32.7 (90.9)	33.8 (92.8)	34.4 (93.9)	34.8 (94.6)	34.5 (94.1)
Daily mean °C (°F)	27.1 (80.8)	28.9 (84.0)	30.5 (86.9)	29.7 (85.5)	28.5 (83.3)	27.3 (81.1)	26.5 (79.7)	26.5 (79.7)	27.2 (81.0)	27.5 (81.5)	27.4 (81.3)	26.7 (80.1)	27.8 (82.0)
Mean daily minimum °C (°F)	18.8 (65.8)	20.5 (68.9)	23.2 (73.8)	23.0 (73.4)	22.6 (72.7)	21.8 (71.2)	21.3 (70.3)	20.9 (69.6)	21.7 (71.1)	21.3 (70.3)	20.4 (68.7)	18.5 (65.3)	21.2 (70.2)
Record low °C (°F)	8.3 (46.9)	14.5 (58.1)	17.0 (62.6)	18.0 (64.4)	17.2 (63.0)	16.4 (61.5)	16.0 (60.8)	17.0 (62.6)	16.5 (61.7)	16.8 (62.2)	15.2 (59.4)	11.0 (51.8)	8.3 (46.9)
Average precipitation mm (inches)	0.4 (0.02)	2.1 (0.08)	17.6 (0.69)	61.8 (2.43)	117.3 (4.62)	135.3 (5.33)	144.0 (5.67)	159.7 (6.29)	130.1 (5.12)	67.7 (2.67)	11.7 (0.46)	0.0 (0.0)	847.7 (33.37)
Average precipitation days (≥ 0.1 mm)	0.1	0.7	3.0	6.8	10.5	10.7	12.4	13.9	10.0	7.3	1.7	0.0	77.1
Average relative humidity (%)	37	31	40	52	64	69	73	74	71	68	56	43	56.5
Mean monthly sunshine hours	279.0	235.2	226.3	201.0	220.1	177.0	195.3	207.7	198.0	226.3	237.0	272.8	2,675.7
Percentage possible sunshine	71	81	60	56	62	57	51	53	53	61	67	78	63
Source: NOAA

== Points of interest ==
The following points of interest are found in or near Rumbek:

- The offices of Rumbek Town Council
- The headquarters of Rumbek Central County
- The headquarters of Lakes State Administration
- Rumbek Holy Family Cathedral
- Rumbek Freedom Square, an outdoor venue in the middle of town for public and civic gatherings
- A branch of Kenya Commercial Bank (South Sudan)
- A branch of Nile Commercial Bank
- Salva Kiir Women International Hospital
- Lakes State Hospital, a public hospital administered by the Lakes State Government
- Rumbek Airport, a small airport with a regular scheduled airline service and private air charter services

== Schools in Rumbek ==
- Gol Meen Primary School
- Rumbek National Secondary School
- Rumbek University, one of several public universities in South Sudan.

== Community development ==
Caritas Rumbek, an arm of Caritas South Sudan, provides community support in rural areas with the assistance of charitable aid raised by CAFOD in the United Kingdom.

== Notable people ==
- Samuel Aru Bol, politician (1929–2000)
- Ager Gum, military leader and song composer (1941–1996)
- Gordon Muortat Mayen, politician (1922–2008)
- Peter Jok, basketball player
- Khaman Maluach, professional basketball player

== See also ==
- Rumbek Airport
- Lakes (state)
- Bahr el Ghazal
