= Rumbek Airport =

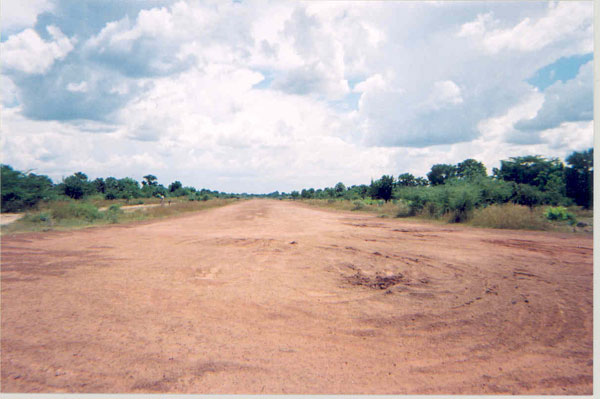
- The runway in 2004
- IATA: RBX; ICAO: HSMK

Summary
- Airport type: Public, Civilian
- Owner: Civil Aviation Authority of South Sudan
- Serves: Rumbek, South Sudan
- Location: Rumbek, South Sudan
- Elevation AMSL: 1,380 ft / 420 m
- Coordinates: 6.83°N 29.67°E

Map
- Location of Rumbek Airport in South Sudan

Runways
| Direction | Length | | Surface |
| Direction | ft | m | Surface |
|---|---|---|---|
| 01/19 | 4,363.5 | 1,330 | Unpaved |

Rumbek Airport (IATA: RBX, ICAO: HSMK) is an airport in South Sudan, near Rumbek, the capital of Lakes State. The airport is served by several national airlines and by air charter service providers.

== Location ==
Rumbek Airport is located in Rumbek Central County, Lakes State, in the Bahr el Ghazal Region of South Sudan, near the town of Rumbek. Its location lies approximately 302 kilometres (188 mi), by air, northwest of Juba International Airport, the largest airport in the country. Rumbek Airport is located at an altitude of 420 metres (1,380 ft) above sea level. The geographical coordinates of this airport are: 6° 49' 48.00"N, 29° 40' 12.00"E (Latitude: 6.83000; Longitude: 29.6700).

== Accidents and incidents ==
- In March 2003, Hawker Siddeley Andover 3C-KKB of 748 Air Services was damaged beyond repair when it crashlanded at Rumbek following an engine failure.
- On 2 May 2008, a Beechcraft 1900c operated by Southern Sudan Air Connection departed Wau (WUU) on a flight to Juba via Rumbek. The airplane was carrying a delegation of leaders from the Sudan People's Liberation Movement (SPLM). Passengers included Dominic Dim Deng, then Southern Sudan's Defense Minister. Near Rumbek, both engines failed leading to a crash that killed all on board.
