= Turkana North Constituency =

Kenyan electoral constituency

Turkana North
- constituency for the Parliament of Kenya
- Turkana North Constituency within Turkana County

- Turkana County within Kenya
- County: Turkana County
- Population: 65,218
- Area: 7,012 km^{2} (2,707.3 sq mi)

Current constituency
- Party: Orange Democratic Movement
- Member of Parliament: Paul Ekwom Nabuin

Turkana North Constituency is an electoral constituency in Kenya. It is one of six constituencies in Turkana County. The constituency was established for the 1997 elections. The constituency has 18 wards, all electing councillors to the Turkana County Council.

== Members of Parliament ==
Elections	MP	Party	Notes
1997	John Munyes	FORD-K	
2002	John Munyes	NARC	
2007	John Munyes	PNU	
2013	Christopher Doye Nakuleu	JP	
2017	Christopher Doye Nakuleu	JP	
2022	Paul Ekwom Nabuin	ODM	

== Wards ==
Wards of Turkana North
Ward	Registered Voters
Kaeris	1,597
Kaikor	1,787
Kakuma	10,355
Kalobeyei	1,648
Kataboi	1,678
Kibish	880
Kokuro	1,651
Lokichoggio	4,527
Lokitaung	2,904
Lorau	989
Loreng	1,358
Loruth Esekon	702
Meyan	574
Naita	1,073
Nanaam / Mogila	1,743
Ngissiger	2,623
Songot	991
Yapakuno	1,894
Total	38,974
*September 2005.
