= List of Kenya Airways destinations =

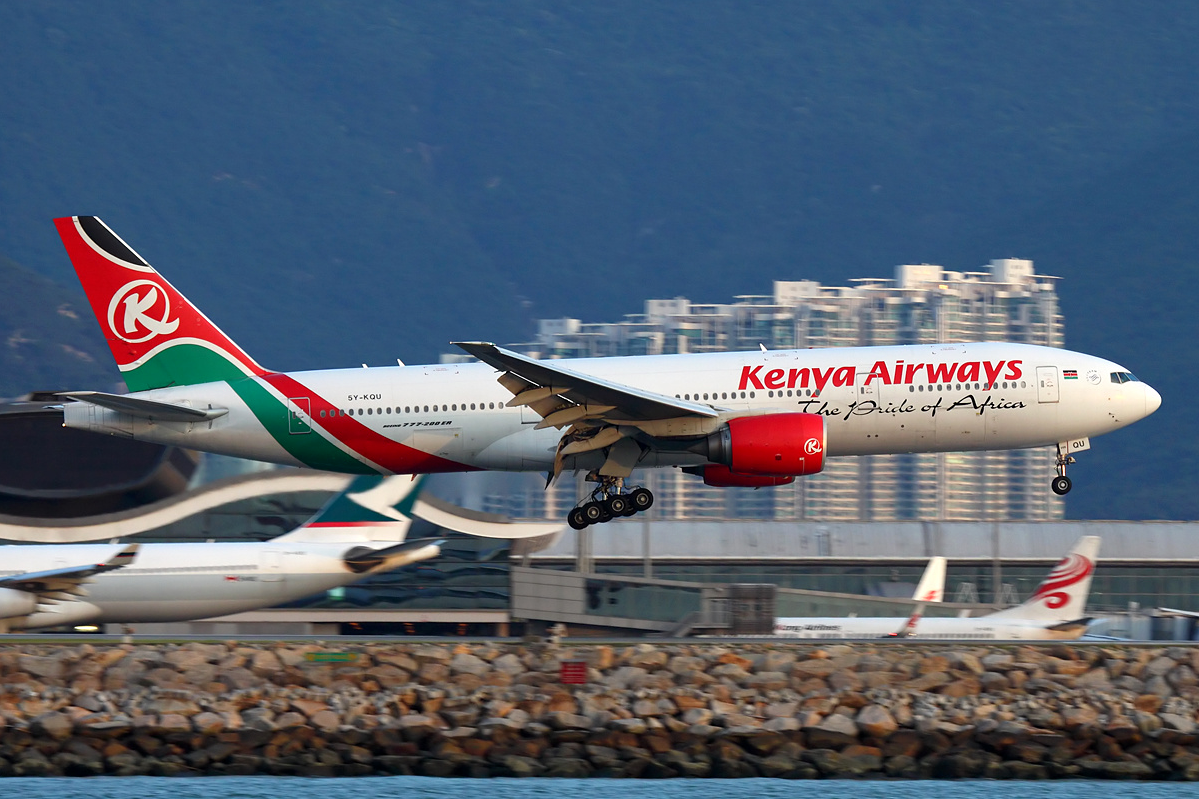
A Kenya Airways Boeing 777-200ER lands at Hong Kong International Airport in 2012.

Kenya Airways was established by the Government of Kenya on 22 January 1977, following the collapse of the East African Union and the consequent folding of East African Airways. It first flew on 4 February 1977 servicing the London–Nairobi route with a Boeing 707–321 leased from British Midland Airways. A year later, the airline's network comprised five domestic and 16 international destinations. In July 1980, the airline's international network consisted of Addis Ababa, Athens, Bombay, Cairo, Copenhagen, Frankfurt, Jeddah, Kampala, Karachi, Khartoum, London, Lusaka, Mauritius, Mogadishu, Rome, Salisbury, Seychelles and Zürich; four Kenyan cities (Kisumu, Malindi, Mombasa and Mumias) were also served.

In June 2012, the carrier announced the suspension of services to Rome and Muscat as part of cost-cutting measures following a 50% fall in profit for FY2011/12. Abuja was added to the network in June 2014. Delhi was terminated in November 2014. In July 2016, the route to Livingstone, Zambia was extended to Cape Town, South Africa. As at July 2016, Kenya Airways served 54 destinations, 44 of them in Africa.

In October 2018, Kenya Airways became the fifth African airline to serve the US market when a route to New York–JFK was inaugurated.

== List ==
The following are current and former Kenya Airways' scheduled destinations, as of September 2019.

Country	City	Airport	Notes	Refs
Angola	Luanda	Quatro de Fevereiro Airport		
Benin	Cotonou	Cadjehoun Airport	Terminated	
Botswana	Gaborone	Sir Seretse Khama International Airport	Terminated	
Burkina Faso	Ouagadougou	Thomas Sankara International Airport Ouagadougou		
Burundi	Bujumbura	Bujumbura International Airport		
Cameroon	Douala	Douala International Airport	Terminated	
Cameroon	Yaoundé	Yaoundé Nsimalen International Airport		
Central African Republic	Bangui	Bangui M'Poko International Airport	Terminated	
Chad	N'Djamena	N'Djamena International Airport	Terminated	
China	Beijing	Beijing Capital International Airport	Terminated	
China	Guangzhou	Guangzhou Baiyun International Airport		
Comoros	Moroni	Prince Said Ibrahim International Airport		
Democratic Republic of the Congo	Kinshasa	N'djili Airport		
Democratic Republic of the Congo	Kisangani	Kisangani Bangoka International Airport		
Democratic Republic of the Congo	Lubumbashi	Lubumbashi International Airport		
Denmark	Copenhagen	Copenhagen Airport	Terminated	
Djibouti	Djibouti City	Djibouti–Ambouli International Airport		
Egypt	Cairo	Cairo International Airport		
Equatorial Guinea	Malabo	Malabo International Airport		
Ethiopia	Addis Ababa	Addis Ababa Bole International Airport		
France	Paris	Charles de Gaulle Airport		
France	Paris	Orly Airport	Terminated	
Gabon	Libreville	Léon-Mba International Airport	Terminated	
Germany	Frankfurt	Frankfurt Airport	Terminated	
Ghana	Accra	Accra International Airport		
Greece	Athens	Ellinikon International Airport	Airport closed	
Hong Kong	Hong Kong	Hong Kong International Airport	Terminated	
India	Delhi	Indira Gandhi International Airport	Terminated	
India	Mumbai	Chhatrapati Shivaji Maharaj International Airport		
Italy	Milan	Milan Malpensa Airport		
Italy	Rome	Leonardo da Vinci–Fiumicino Airport		
Ivory Coast	Abidjan	Félix-Houphouët-Boigny International Airport		
Kenya	Eldoret	Eldoret International Airport	Terminated	
Kenya	Kisumu	Kisumu Airport		
Kenya	Lokichogio	Lokichogio Airport	Terminated	
Kenya	Malindi	Malindi Airport		
Kenya	Mombasa	Moi International Airport		
Kenya	Mumias	Mumias Airport	Terminated	
Kenya	Nairobi	Jomo Kenyatta International Airport	Hub	
Liberia	Monrovia	Roberts International Airport		
Madagascar	Antananarivo	Ivato International Airport		
Malawi	Blantyre	Chileka International Airport		
Malawi	Lilongwe	Kamuzu International Airport		
Mali	Bamako	Bamako–Sénou International Airport		
Mauritius	Port Louis	Sir Seewoosagur Ramgoolam International Airport		
Mayotte	Dzaoudzi	Dzaoudzi–Pamandzi International Airport		
Mozambique	Maputo	Maputo International Airport		
Mozambique	Nampula	Nampula Airport		
Netherlands	Amsterdam	Amsterdam Airport Schiphol		
Nigeria	Abuja	Nnamdi Azikiwe International Airport	Terminated	
Nigeria	Lagos	Murtala Muhammed International Airport		
Oman	Muscat	Muscat International Airport	Terminated	
Pakistan	Karachi	Jinnah International Airport	Terminated	
Republic of the Congo	Brazzaville	Maya-Maya Airport		
Rwanda	Kigali	Kigali International Airport		
Saudi Arabia	Jeddah	King Abdulaziz International Airport	Terminated	
Senegal	Dakar	Blaise Diagne International Airport		
Senegal	Dakar	Léopold Sédar Senghor International Airport	Terminated	
Seychelles	Mahé	Seychelles International Airport		
Sierra Leone	Freetown	Lungi International Airport		
Somalia	Mogadishu	Aden Adde International Airport	Terminated	
South Africa	Cape Town	Cape Town International Airport		
South Africa	Johannesburg	O. R. Tambo International Airport		
South Sudan	Juba	Juba International Airport		
Sudan	Khartoum	Khartoum International Airport		
Sweden	Stockholm	Stockholm Arlanda Airport	Terminated	
Switzerland	Geneva	Geneva Airport		
Switzerland	Zürich	Zurich Airport	Terminated	
Tanzania	Dar es Salaam	Julius Nyerere International Airport		
Tanzania	Kilimanjaro	Kilimanjaro International Airport		
Tanzania	Zanzibar	Abeid Amani Karume International Airport		
Thailand	Bangkok	Suvarnabhumi Airport		
Turkey	Istanbul	Atatürk Airport	Terminated	
Uganda	Entebbe	Entebbe International Airport		
United Arab Emirates	Abu Dhabi	Abu Dhabi International Airport	Terminated	
United Arab Emirates	Dubai	Dubai International Airport		
United Kingdom	Bristol	Bristol Airport	Terminated	
United Kingdom	London	Gatwick Airport		
United Kingdom	London	Heathrow Airport		
United States	New York City	John F. Kennedy International Airport		
Vietnam	Hanoi	Noi Bai International Airport	Terminated	
Zambia	Livingstone	Harry Mwaanga Nkumbula International Airport		
Zambia	Lusaka	Kenneth Kaunda International Airport		
Zambia	Ndola	Ndola Airport		
Zimbabwe	Harare	Robert Gabriel Mugabe International Airport		
Zimbabwe	Victoria Falls	Victoria Falls Airport		
