= East African Safari Air =

Kenyan airline

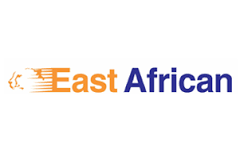
IATA	ICAO	Call sign
B5	EXZ	DUMA
- Founded: 1989
- Ceased operations: 2011
- Hubs: Jomo Kenyatta International Airport
- Focus cities: Milan; Rome; London; Ibiza; Zanzibar; Kilimanjaro; Zurich; Juba
- Frequent-flyer program: None
- Alliance: None
- Fleet size: Fleet East African Safari Air: (Up to and before 2004) 1 Beechcraft B200 Super King Air 4 Cessna 208 Caravans 4 Boeing 767-300 ER East African Safari Air Express (After 2003 and until 2008): 2 Fokker F28 4000 1 Grumman Gulfstream I 2 McDonnell Douglas DC-9-14
- Destinations: 11
- Parent company: East African Safari Air Limited
- Headquarters: Nairobi, Kenya
- Key people: Anthony Ambaka Kegode, founder, chairman and chief executive officer
- Employees: 97
- Website: www.eastafrican.com

East African Safari Air was an airline based in Kenya. Its international operations were suspended in September 2004, by the Kenya Civil Aviation Authority, but the airline still maintained scheduled regional and domestic services through its subsidiary East African Safari Air Express. In December 2010, East African Safari Air Express was ostensibly purchased by the parent company of another Kenyan airline Fly540 and was rebranded as Fly SAX. (Litigation concerning this purchase is pending in Kenyan courts).

== History ==
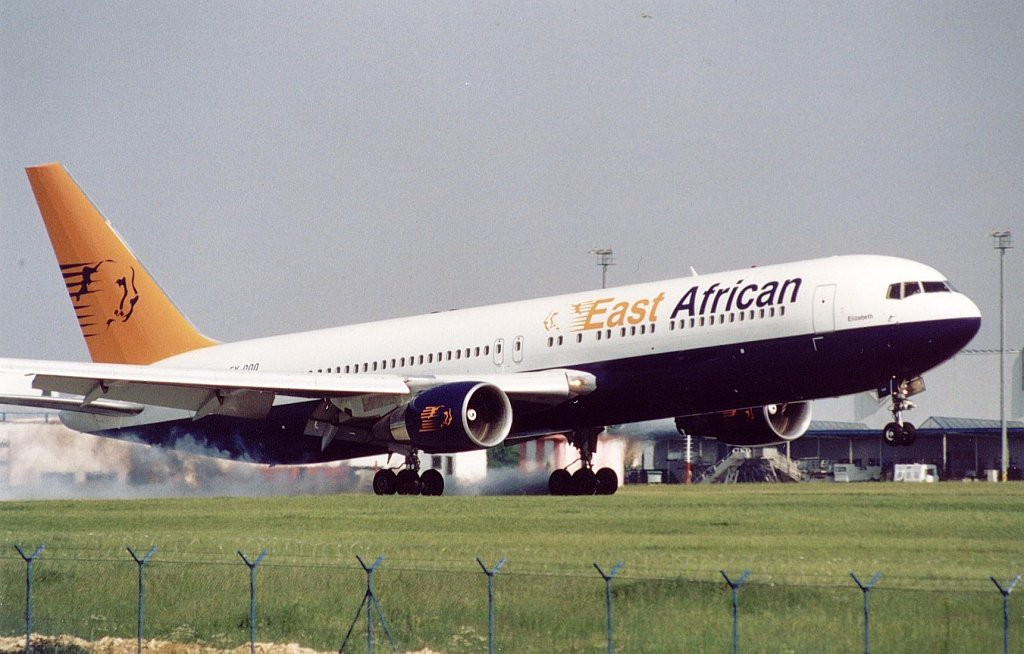
East African Safari Air's Boeing 767 300 ER 'Elizabeth' Lands in Ibiza Spain

East African Safari Air Limited was founded by Anthony A Kegode, a well-known African entrepreneur and aviator. The airline was derived from a company known as Car Hire Services (Aviation) Limited, which was incorporated on or about 16 May 1989 in the Companies Registry as No. C. 40158. The company later changed its name to East African Safari Air Limited on 27 February 1998.

At the time of incorporation of Car Hire Services (Aviation) limited the shareholders were Mr. Kegode, M/s William Henry Boyd Parkinson, Pritam Singh Panesar and Samuel Gakuru. On 27 November 1990, Mr. Mohammed Aslam Khan was appointed managing director of CHS Aviation, and in December 1990 East African Safari Air (then CHS Aviation) was granted a license from the Civil Aviation Board to operate scheduled and coach services to the Maasai Mara. Additionally, CHS Aviation operated 2 Cessna 310s and 1 Cessna 402B. In 1990 East African Safari Air (then CHS Aviation) borrowed US$247,000 from Barclays Bank Kenya and purchased a de Havilland Twin Otter from Sataircraft in Denmark registration 5Y-KEG (after the first three letters of the founder's last name KEGODE) and leased it to Air Kenya Aviation Ltd.

In 1992 CHS Aviation became the first privately owned Kenyan carrier, if not in the East African region, to be licensed by the Kenya Civil Aviation Board to operate charter flights to and from South Africa to Mombasa using a Boeing 707 aircraft. Kenya Airways attempted to have the designation withdrawn as it faced the prospect of competition for the first time from the private sector.

12 November 1992 CHS Aviation was licensed by the Kenya Civil Aviation Board and the Italian Civil Aviation Authorities to operate charter flights to and from Italy and Mombasa. CHS aviation flew from Milan to Mombasa wet leasing two Boeing 767 300ER from Air Europe (Italy). As East African Safari Air the company ferried 1,320,000 tourist passengers to and from Italy to Kenya between 1992 and 2002.

In October 1992 there was an ownership change and the Managing Director Aslam Khan left CHS Aviation to start his own charter company Aircraft Leasing Services Ltd. In February 1993 CHS Aviation was granted permission to operate charter flights from Nairobi to Paris and Mombasa to Paris. CHS Aviation used a McDonnell Douglas MD-82 of 167 pax to operate the route twice a week. In October 1993 CHS Aviation added two Cessna 208 Caravans and a Beechcraft B200 King Air to its general aviation fleet, to provide charter services to Southern Sudan for the South Sudan Liberation Movement. At the end of October 1993 CHS Aviation had three Cessna Caravans, and two King Air B200s operating flights to Southern Sudan. In February 1998 Anthony Kegode and Uhai Ltd bought out all the shares of WHB Parkinson and PS Panesar. Uhai Ltd was then owned 100% by Anthony Kegode and Elizabeth Kegode.

When the company later changed its name to East African Safari Air Limited on 27 February 1998, it saw the exist of the other founder shareholders, with Uhai Limited and Mr. Kegode acquiring 100% of the shares of East African Safari Air. Mr. Pritam Singh Panesar remaining on the board of the company as a non-shareholding Director; by a special resolution passed on 2 July 1998, Mrs. Elizabeth Ann Kegode was appointed as a member of East African Safari Air, Anthony Kegode became the carriers' Executive Chairman.

In 1998 East African Safari Air applied to the Kenya Government and was the first privately owned local airline to be granted designation on Bilateral Air Service Agreements to all Common Market for Eastern and Southern Africa (COMESA) Countries, France, Germany, the United Kingdom, Italy, Switzerland and Germany. The company was also granted permits to operate scheduled flights to Mombasa, Lokkichoggio, and Kisumu from Nairobi.

In or about the year 2001, East African Safari Air acquired all (99%) but one of the shares in Flying Jetpet (Kenya) limited, which was incorporated as Company No. c. 82314. The said company later changed its name to East African Safari Air Express Limited. In 2001 East African Safari Air acquired 99% East African Safari Air Express Limited with Anthony Kegode still holding 1% of the company.

In 2003 East African Safari Air began operating international, and regional designated routes, local scheduled and other charter flights, using two Boeing 767-300ER (5Y-CCC & 5Y-QQQ) and two F28 -4000.

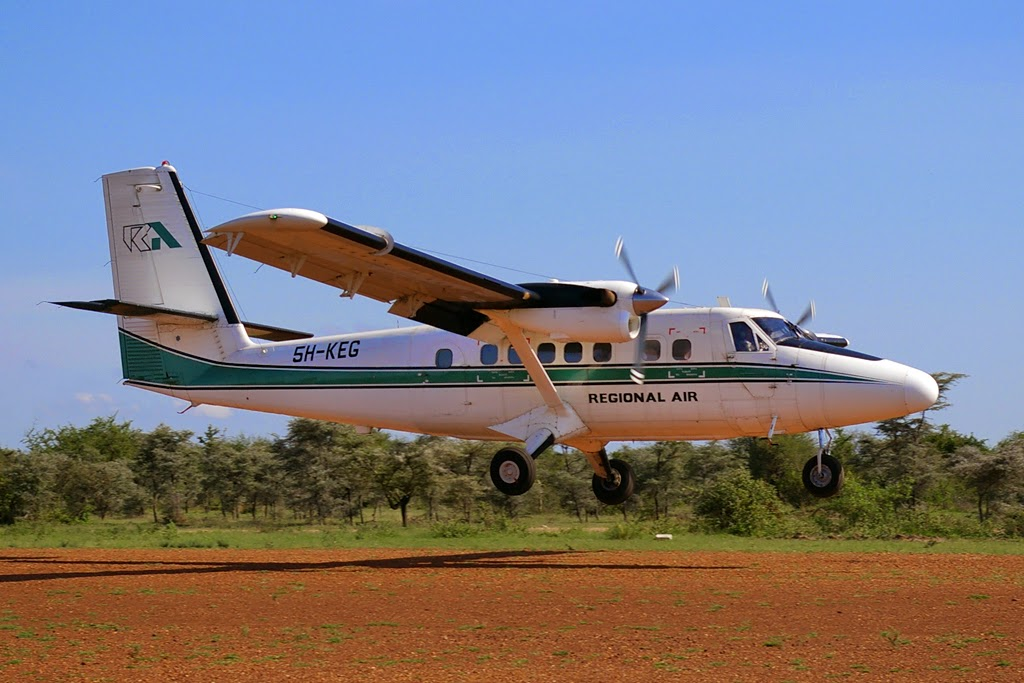
5H-KEG operates in Grumeti Tanzania with Regional Air, a subsidiary of Air Kenya. The aircraft was formerly 5Y-KEG with East African Safari Air.

East African Safari Air Express purchased Eagle Aviations' two Fokker F28 Fellowship aircraft by a Conditional Sale Agreement dated 30 April 2003 from Aircraft Services Corporation ("ACS") based in Ireland, a subsidiary of General Electric Aviation Capital ("GECAS"). Prior to the execution of the agreement Aircraft Services Corporation entered into an early termination accord with M/s Eagle Aviation Limited concluding an earlier contract between the parties to facilitate the sale of Fokker F28-4000 Serial No 11229 and Fokker F28-4000 Serial No 11231 to East African Safari Air Express.

Fast growth saw the airline run into cash flow problems and in late 2003 East African Safari Air started to search for investors. In May 2004 Mr. Adam Ogden through Two Ninety Investments Limited approached East African Safari Air Express with an interest to invest in the company. On 27 August 2003 passengers narrowly escaped a crash when their plane made an emergency landing soon after take-off at Kisumu Airport after it hit a flock of birds. The Nairobi-bound East African Safari Air Express plane Fokker F28-4000 landed safely but burst a tyre in the morning incident aircraft. On 7 December 2003 another Fokker F28-4000 5Y – NNN was involved in an accident at Lokichoggio Airport, Kenya. In late 2003, as the operations of East African Safari Air (the parent of East African Safari Air Express) experiences unrelenting cash flow problems. This was due to the company's decision to operate five flights per week to London Heathrow from Nairobi. East African Safari Air entered into a joint venture agreement with British Midland International (bmi) airlines, who provided passenger handling services at London Heathrow Airport (LHR). Although East African Safari Air was the first to introduce daytime flights out of Nairobi to London, and direct flights to the resort holiday town of Mombasa, other major airlines quickly followed suit. At first, the difficulty in establishing strong traffic numbers was forcing the company to operate near empty flights to and from Heathrow. Gradually however, the numbers carried began to steadily increase. Unfortunately the months by which the route was being built and traffic was uneconomical had taken their toll. East African Safari Air had accumulated nearly US$24,000,000 in debt.

At this stage however passenger traffic had steadily gained in numbers, and the forward bookings in mid-2004 showed that all the airline's flights would operate at strong load factors and have enough business to trade out its crushing debt. In early 2004 it was decided that the company would benefit from the injection of investment capital from the outside. To this end, Ogden who was well known to the largest shareholders of the company, Mr. and Mrs. Kegode, introduced a company by the name of Four Ninety Investments Limited willing to invest US$6,000,000.

An agreement prepared by Four Ninety's lawyers Walker Kontos advocates to the effect that, interalia, East African Safari Air was insolvent and that Four Ninety would only pay Ksh 5 for a 90% stake in the company, but invest enough cash to take the company out of insolvency. The agreement left Anthony A Kegode with only 10% interest in the company and also saw to it that Mr. Kegode was to be bound by way of personal guarantees for 100% of the loans the company had hitherto taken. "As much as I felt the arrangement was inequitable, I was at pains to salvage the company, and since the strategy of Four Ninety in the run up to this final agreement had left us with no other choices to save the business, we were inclined to proceed with the sale for the sake of the company's survival," said Kegode.

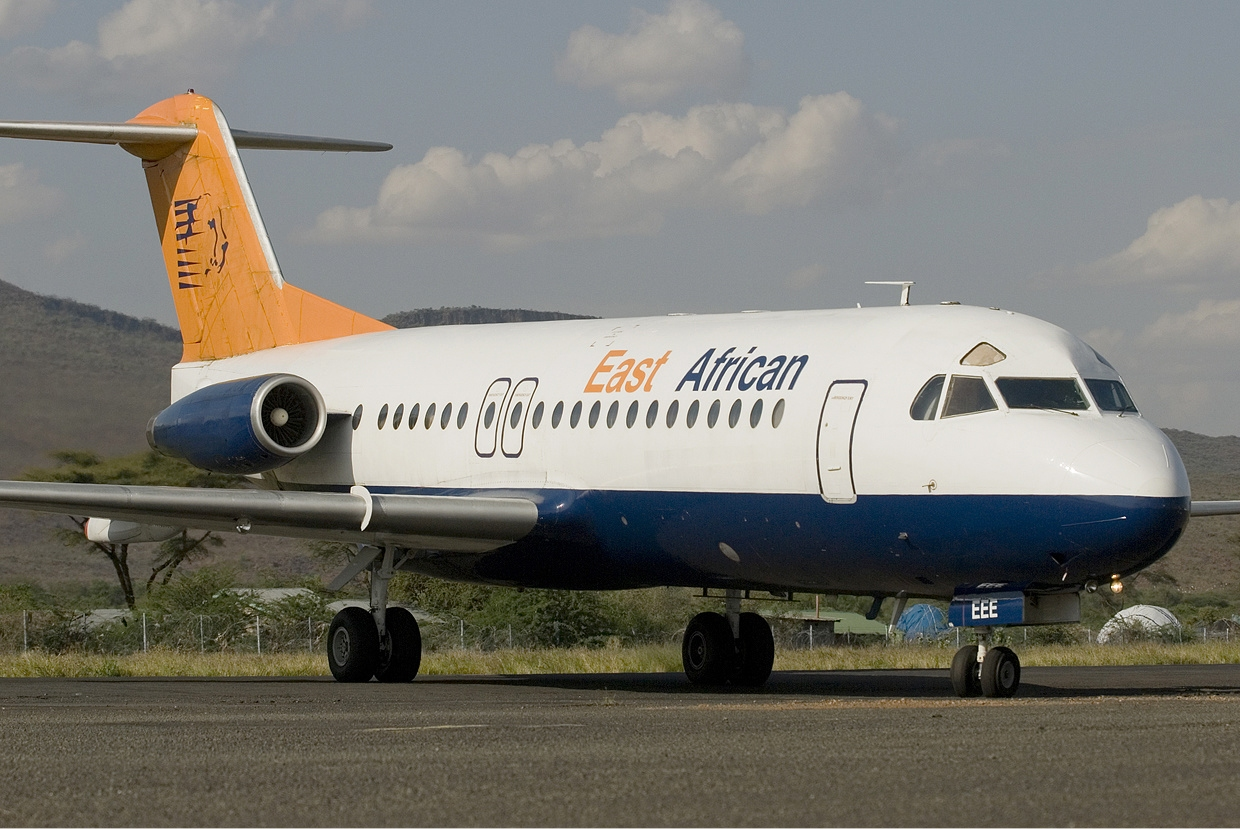
East Africa Safari Air Express F28 4000

East African Safari Air Shareholders passed minority rights and approved the agreement selling 90% shares to Four Ninety and leaving the founder with 10% shareholding in the company on 4 June 2004. Ogden thereafter took over the management of the company's operations.

On 13 September 2004, nearly four months under Ogden's stewardship, East African Safari Air and East African Safari Air Express were placed in receivership, a month after only US$2,000,000 was purportedly paid in by Four Ninety Investments Limited, only one third of the US$6,000,000 required for the airline's recovery needs. At that time the airline was ferrying approx 25,000 passengers per month on various routes.

== Fleet, Incidents and accidents ==
- On 28 July 2004, a Boeing 767 - 5Y-QQQ - operated by East African Safari Air experienced a fire in the left engine shortly after takeoff from Rome. The flight crew extinguished the fire after the second fire bottle was deployed and discharged. The airplane returned to Rome and landed uneventfully.
- On 7 December 2003, East African Safari Air Express Flight 812 from Nairobi overran the runway after landing at Lokichokio. The Fokker F28 went through a fence and came to rest in a ditch. Five of the 44 occupants were injured.

Fleet East African Safari Air: (Up to and before 2004)

- 1 Beechcraft B200 Super King Air
- 4 Cessna 208 Caravans
- 4 Boeing 767-300 ER

East African Safari Air Express (After 2003 and until 2008):

- 2 Fokker F28 4000
- 1 Grumman Gulfstream I
- 2 McDonnell Douglas DC-9-14
