= John Munyes =

Kenyan politician

Member of the Kenyan Senate

Member of the U.S. House of Representatives from 's Turkana County district
- Incumbent
- Assumed office 28 March 2013

Personal details
- Party: Jubilee Party of Kenya
- Spouse: Maryanne Munyes

John Kiyonga Munyes is a Kenyan politician born in 1966 in modern day Turkana County. He attended Lokitaung Primary School for his primary education and he later attended Lodwar High School for his ‘O Level’ and ‘A Level’. He later attended St Francis University for his undergraduate studies.

He belonged to the Jubilee party and was elected to represent the Turkana North Constituency in the National Assembly of Kenya in the 2007 Kenyan parliamentary election. He later represented Turkana county as a Senator in the Senate of Kenya as elected in the 2013 Kenya Senate elections and is a member of the Jubilee Party of Kenya political party. He also held the seat of Labour Minister as appointed by President Mwai Kibaki.

In 2018, President Uhuru Kenyatta nominated him to serve as Kenya's Cabinet Secretary in charge of Petroleum and Mining, a post he held until February 8, 2022. He later resigned from the position to pursue political interests ahead of the August 2022 General Election.
