= Lokichogio Mixed Secondary School =

School in Turkana County, Kenya

Lokichogio Mixed Secondary School, also known as Lokichogio AIC Secondary School, is a secondary school in Lokichogio, Turkana County, Kenya.

== Attack ==
In October 2017 a militia attacked the school, killing six students and a security guard. The accused mastermind was a former student from the South Sudanese Toposa ethnic group, who was upset over being suspended for fighting.

The attack occurred at 3 AM. The militia members, from South Sudan, failed to find the head teacher and the students believed to have been behind the suspension. Instead they attacked other students. They killed students in a boys' dorm, then attacked a girls' dormitory. The news reports stated two girls were victims of rape. Students with serious injuries were sent to Lodwar Referral Hospital while those with minor injuries were sent to Lopiding Hospital. The school was placed in an indefinite closure as a result.

The primary suspect was placed into police custody on Saturday October 14, 2017, but died when a mob overwhelmed the police and lynched him.
