= Nabuyatom Crater =

Nabiyotum crater
- Location within Kenya
- Location: Samburu county, Kenya
- Coordinates: 2°24′49″N 36°37′20″E
- Type: Circular caldera
- Elevation: 1,909 ft (582 m)

The Nabiyotum crater, also called the Nabuyatom cone, is a circular caldera that was formed after a volcano collapsed. The crater is located at the southern end of Lake Turkana, an alkaline lake in the Kenyan Rift Valley and it is one of the tourist sites in Kenya. The closest town, Lodvar, is over 70 kilometers away from the lake and crater. The Nabiyotum crater was discovered by non-indigenous Westerners in 1888.
