= Turkana Geothermal Power Station =

Kenyan power station

- Country: Kenya
- Location: Katilia, Turkana County
- Coordinates: 02°18′52″N 36°34′55″E
- Status: Under construction
- Construction began: 2018
- Commission date: 2022 (expected)
- Owner: Olsuswa Energy Limited

Thermal power station
- Primary fuel: Geothermal

Power generation
- Nameplate capacity: 140 MW (190,000 hp)

The Turkana Geothermal Power Station is a 140-megawatt (187,743 hp) geothermal power station under development in Kenya.

== Location ==
The power station would be located in the Suguta Valley, Turkana County, in the semi-arid north-western Kenya, immediately south of Lake Turkana. This location is near the settlement of Katilia, approximately 168 kilometres (104 mi), by road, south-east of Lodwar, where the county headquarters are located. This location is approximately 479 kilometres (298 mi), by road, north-northwest of Nairobi, Kenya's capital and largest city.

== Overview ==
Reconnaissance surveys by a team from the British Geological Survey indicated the occurrence of a hydro-thermal system in the project area. In 2011, further surface studies revealed a high-temperature resource area covering 60 square kilometres (23 sq mi), with sub-surface temperatures of about 281 °C (538 °F) and an estimated potential to generate up to 1 GW of base load geothermal electricity.

Olsuswa Energy Limited, a locally registered company plans to develop this power station, starting with a 70 megawatt power station, which is expected to expand to 140 megawatts, over a five to eight-year period. The electricity generated is expected to be interrelated into the national electricity grid.

In April 2018, Olsuswa Energy Limited signed a memorandum of understanding with the Turkana County government in the presence of the elected leaders of the community and the public. The development is expected to bring jobs and improved living standards of the residents.

== Ownership ==
The co-owners of the project under Olsuswa Energy Limited are Olsuswa Power Limited, a Kenyan owned power developer owned by the Manga Mugwe family office and Frontier Energy, Denmark. The project area covers an estimated 136 square kilometres (53 sq mi).

== Funding ==
The entire project is expected to cost US$1 billion, spread out over a 5-8 year period. The owner/developers expect to raise the funds though equity and institutional loans. In November 2017, the African Union Commission granted US$980,000 towards the development of this power station.

== See also ==
- List of power stations in Kenya
- Energy in Kenya
