= A1 road (Kenya) =

Road in Kenya

Coordinates: 0.441637°N 34.852066°E

A1 Road

Route information
- Maintained by Kenya National Highways Authority

Major junctions
- North end: Lokichokio
- South end: Isebania

Location
- Country: Kenya

Highway system
- Transport in Kenya

Road route

The A1 road is a long road in Kenya extending from the Tanzanian border to the South Sudanese border.

== Sections ==
The Isebania to Ahero portion of the roadway was upgraded between 2016 and 2023. This 172 kilometer section of road was upgraded with safer crossings, connections to feeder roads, modern signage, resurfacing and markings in order to improve user safety. The project was led by Sirari Construction with funding provided by the Government of Kenya and the African Development Bank Group.

China State Engineering Corporation is upgrading a 40km section of the A1 between the towns of Lokichar and Loichangamatak; the Third Engineering Bureau of China City Construction Group is doing the same to an 80km section between Lokitaung and Lodwar. These improvements were part of a $624 million award from The World Bank to the Government of Kenya to improve roadways across the country.

== Towns ==
The following towns, listed from south towards north, are located along the highway

- Isebania (border town to Tanzania)
- Migori
- Awendo
- Rongo
- Kisii
- Oyugis
- Sondu
- Ahero
- Kisumu
- Vihiga
- Kakamega
- Webuye
- Kitale
- Makutano
- Lokichar
- Lodwar
- Kakuma
- Lokichokio (the last town before the South Sudanese border)

The section between Ahero and Kisumu is common with B1 road towards Nakuru.
