= Middle East Reformed Fellowship =

Middle East Reformed Fellowship is a missionary organization evangelizing the Middle East, North Africa and now Indonesia on behalf of Reformed Churches and believers worldwide.

== Structure ==
The Middle East Reformed Fellowship was founded in 1971. It has been registered in the Republic of Cyprus since 1984 as a religious, non-profit and non-political charitable organisation. The Fellowship serves in the Middle East, North Africa and, more recently, Indonesia, Pakistan, Nigeria, Somalia, Tanzania and Kenya on behalf of Reformed Churches and believers worldwide. It is for those who are committed to proclaim the historic Christian faith as expressed in the early ecumenical creeds and the confessions of the Calvinist Reformation.

Its international headquarters is at the John Calvin Centre in Larnaca, Cyprus.

The Fellowship is administered by seven directors representing the Fellowship's International Council which is composed of leaders from both its Field and Support Committees. The General Director is the Reverend Victor Atallah, based in Larnaca, from where he travels extensively promoting and encouraging the work of the Fellowship.

== Activities and ministry ==
The Bible and the historic reformed confessions form the theological basis for the Fellowship, which aims to "declare the whole counsel of God". These confessions include the Canons of Dort, Belgic Confession, Heidelberg Catechism and Westminster Confession.

Outreach is through indigenous evangelists sponsored by their own national reformed churches, as they know the circumstances, language and culture of their own people. They are accepted as part of their community, and do not return to a foreign country on furlough.

Gospel radio programming in local languages is broadcast from Radio Monte Carlo through transmitters located in Cyprus and Monaco, in conjunction with Words of Hope, a ministry of the Reformed Church of America, and The Back to God Hour, a ministry of the Christian Reformed Church in North America. Studios are located in Beirut, Cairo, Lokichoggio, Addis Ababa, Khartoum and Larnaca. Others are being established in Pakistan and Indonesia. Presenters use a conversational style to discuss issues of importance, and invite listeners to write in. They receive personal replies, and, over time, the challenge of the Gospel is presented as trust develops. MERF programming reaches an estimated audience of 4 million people and generates about 300 letters a month from new listeners.

Reformed literature is translated into Arabic for publication and distribution.

The John Calvin Centre in Larnaca houses an evangelical study centre and research library where pastors and elders from North Africa and the Middle East come for training and encouragement. A mixed congregation of locals and foreigners meet at Trinity Chapel which is attached to the centre. Additional study centres have also been established in Beirut, Cairo and Lokichoggio.

Diaconal aid is provided from time to time through local churches in order to make their people self-sufficient rather than merely meet immediate needs.

The Fellowship is predominantly active in the Arabic speaking countries and other Muslim majority countries. Many of these are represented by Field Committees.

Support Committees are located in the United States, Canada, England, Scotland, Ireland, the Netherlands, Australia and New Zealand.

According to Allan M. Harman, MERF has "done much to propagate the gospel in Arabic, to bring leaders out of their home countries for periods of training and to administer fine diaconal projects that have alleviated the pressing needs of many in Muslim communities."
