= Angorangora =

- Location within Kenya
- Coordinates: 2.63°N 35.4°E
- Country: Kenya
- Province: Rift Valley Province

Population
  - Total: 134 (estimated)
- Time zone: UTC+3 (EAT)

Angorangora is a settlement in Kenya's Turkana County. It has an estimated population of 134 people.

Geographical map of Kenya

== History ==
Before the Kenyan general election in 2013, Angorangora voted as part of the Rift Valley Province.
