= Ahero =

Town in Kenya

Coordinates: 0°11′S 34°55′E

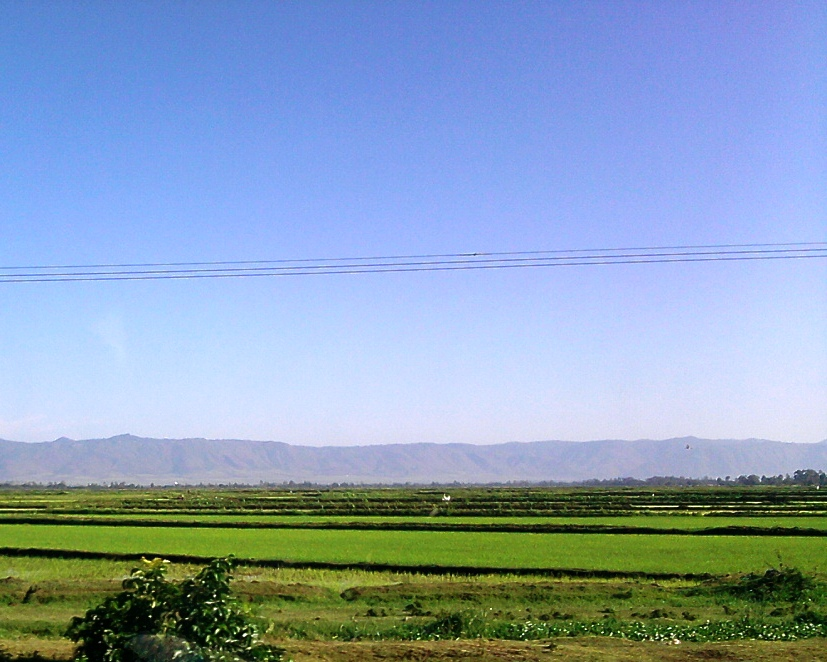
Country side scenes

Ahero is a town close to the city of Kisumu, the third largest city in Kenya and the second largest city, after Kampala, in the Lake Victoria Basin. It is an agricultural town in Kenya that is part of Kisumu County. The town has a retail market serving as the main trading center for food and goods coming from Kisii, Homabay, and Nandi. It hosts a town council and has an urban population of 7,891 and a total population of 61,556 (1999 census).

Ahero is located 20 kilometres east of the county capital, Kisumu. Two major roads meet at Ahero, the B3 road from Nakuru To Kisumu and A1 road from Tanzanian border. The Nyando River flows through central Ahero and helps irrigate its many rice fields.
