= Turkana West Constituency =

Electoral constituency of Kenya

Turkana West
- constituency for the Parliament of Kenya
- Turkana West Constituency within Turkana County

- Turkana County within Kenya
- County: Turkana County
- Population: 239,627
- Area: 16,799 km^{2} (6,486.1 sq mi)

Current constituency
- Party: UDA
- Member of Parliament: Daniel Epuyo Nanok

Turkana West is a constituency in Kenya. It is one of six constituencies of Turkana County.
