= Lodwar Airport =

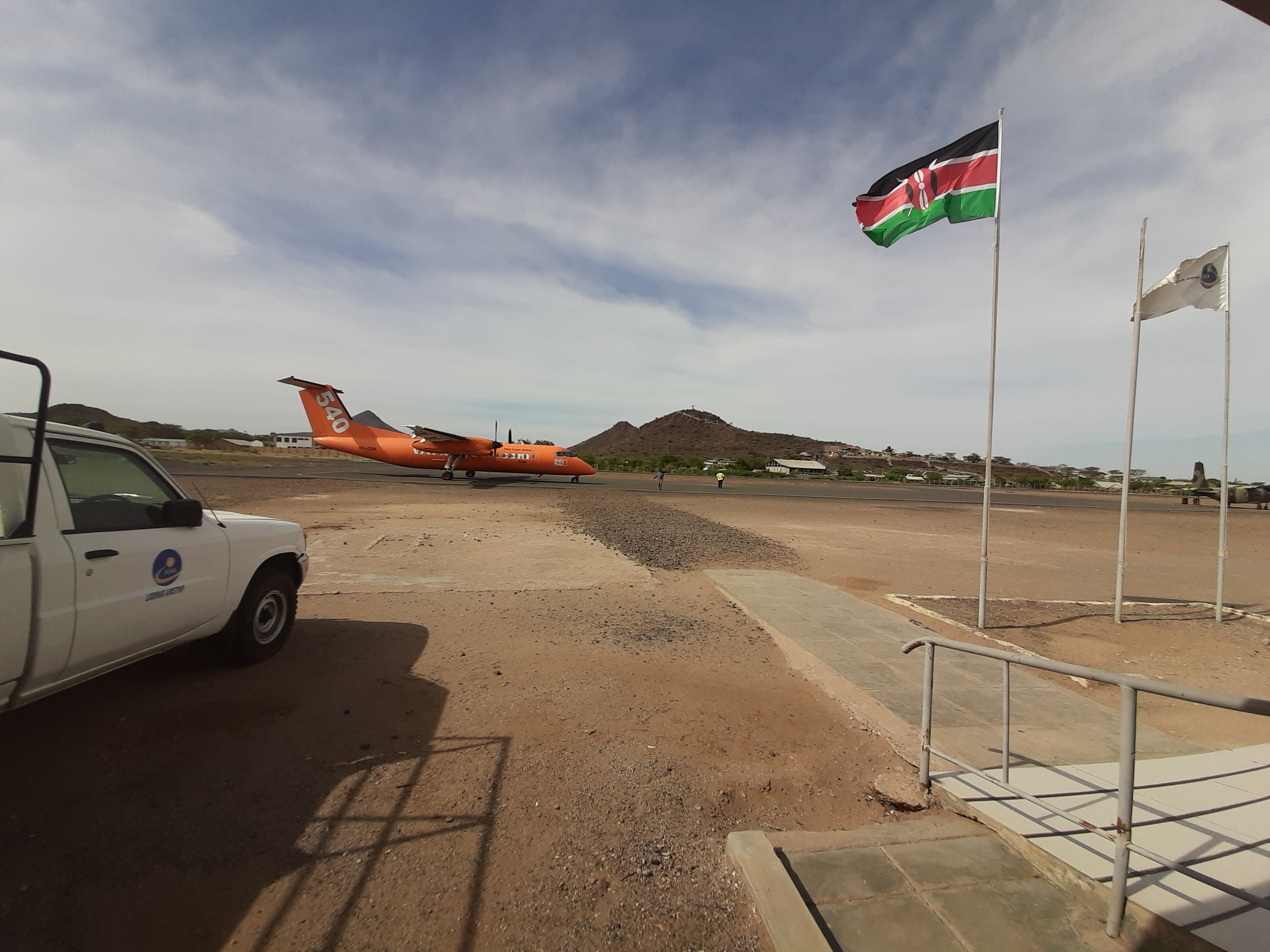
- IATA: LOK; ICAO: HKLO

Summary
- Airport type: Public, Civilian
- Owner: Kenya Civil Aviation Authority
- Serves: Lodwar, Kenya
- Location: Lodwar, Kenya
- Elevation AMSL: 1,715 ft (523 m)
- Coordinates: 03°07′20″N 35°36′36″E

Map
- Location of Lodwar Airport in Kenya Lodwar (Africa)

Runways
| Direction | Length | | Surface |
| Direction | ft | m | Surface |
|---|---|---|---|
| 09/27 | 3,281 | 1,000 | Asphalt |

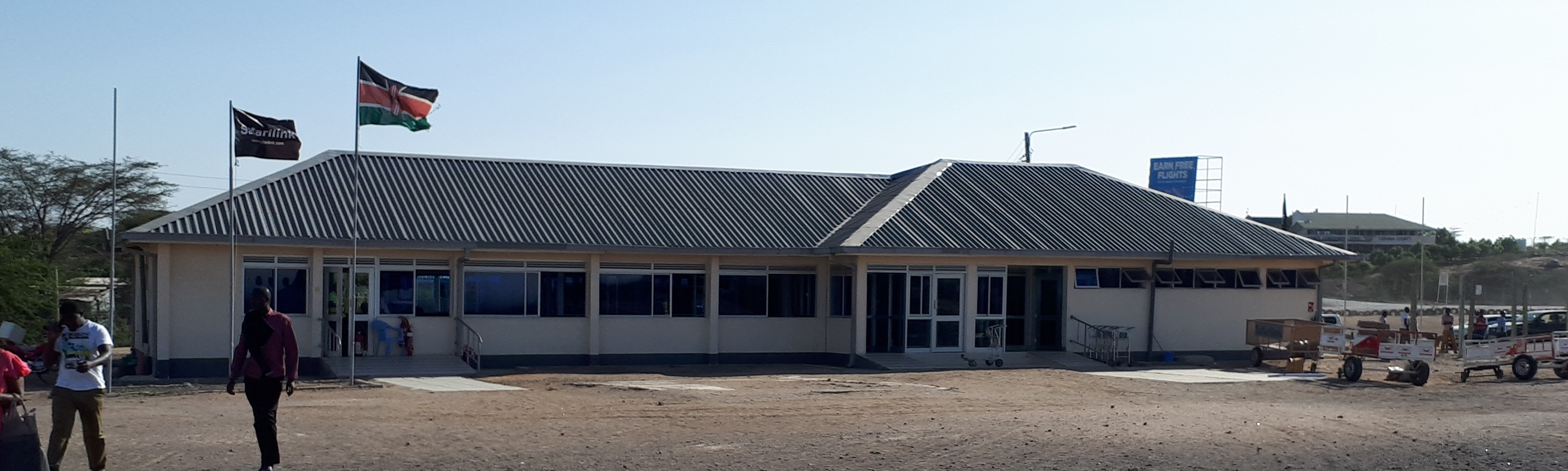
New Lodwar Airport Terminal Building Old Lodwar Airport Terminal Building in Turkana County, Kenya

Lodwar Airport is an airport in Kenya.

== Location ==
Lodwar Airport (IATA: LOK, ICAO: HKLO) is located in Turkana County, in the town of Lodwar, in the northwestern part of the Republic of Kenya. Its location is approximately 515 kilometres (320 mi), by air, northwest of Nairobi International Airport, the country's largest civilian airport.

== Overview ==
Lodwar Airport is a civilian airport that serves the town of Lodwar and surrounding communities. Situated at 1,715 feet (523 m) above sea level, the airport has a single asphalt runway which measures 1000 m in length and is 15 m wide.

== Airlines and destinations ==
| Airlines | Destinations |
|---|---|
| Aircraft Leasing Services | Lokichogio, Nairobi–Wilson |
| Fly540 | Eldoret |
| Fly-SAX | Nairobi–Wilson |
| Skyward Express | Nairobi–Wilson |

There are also some UNHAS flights only available to UN and INGO staff.

== See also ==
- Kenya Airports Authority
- Kenya Civil Aviation Authority
- List of airports in Kenya
