= Lowarengak =

- Location within Kenya
- Coordinates: 4.28°N 35.89°E
- Country: Kenya
- Province: Rift Valley Province

Population
  - Total: 30,000
- As of 1992
- Time zone: UTC+3 (EAT)

Lowarengak is a town in northern Kenya, near the Kenyan-Ethiopian border. Lowarengak lies on the northwestern margin of Lake Turkana, between the towns of Todenyang to the north, and Nachukui to the south. The town receives fresh water from the Lowarengak and Nakitokonon rivers that drain from the Lapur hills.

== Geology ==
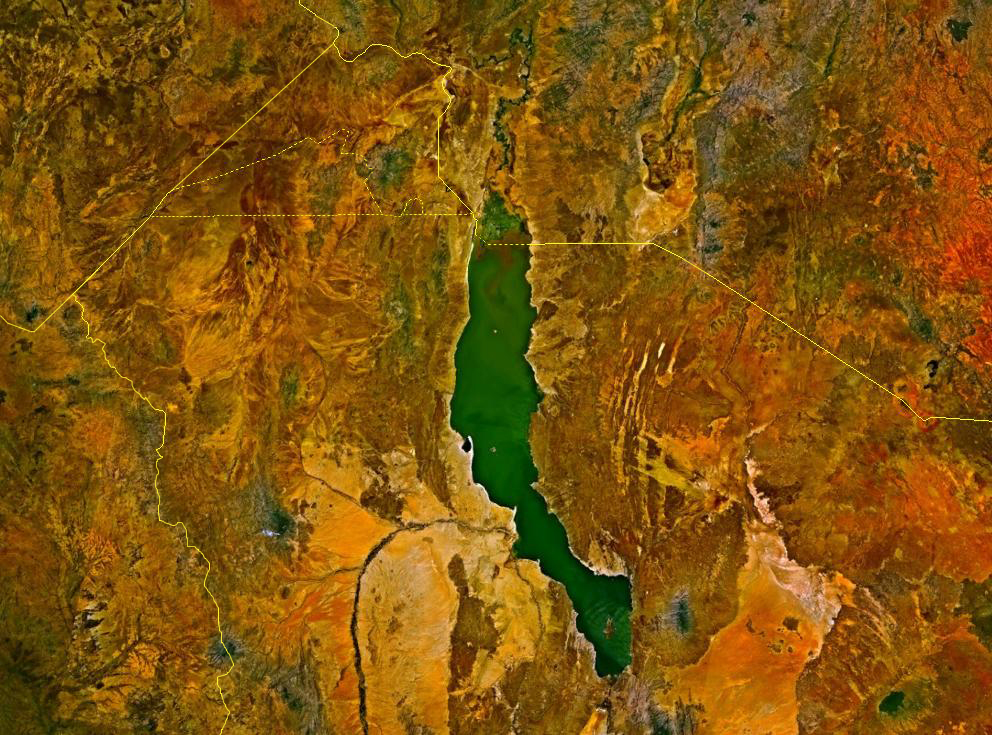
Satellite image of Lake Turkana, where Lowarengak resides.

Lowarengak is situated just north of the Nachukui formation, a sedimentary sequence 730 meters thick that includes deposits from formation members including the Lonyumun (4.2-4 million years ago or Ma), Kataboi (3.9-3.4 Ma), Lomekwi (3.4-2.5 Ma), Lokalalei (2.5-2.3 Ma), Kalochoro (2.3–1.9 Ma), Kaitio (1.9–1.6 Ma), Natoo (1.6–1.3 Ma), and Nariokotome (1.3–0.6 Ma, the place is also known for the Turkana boy). Most deposits fer formed under lacustrine, fluvial and alluvial fan contexts, and some include remains of Australopithecus and Kenyanthropus.

== Populations ==
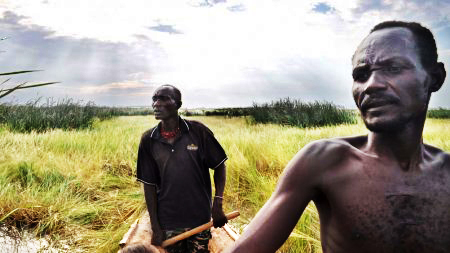
Lowarengak is mostly inhabited by Turkana people, many of whom are fisherman.

Both Turkana and Merile pastoralists live in the region. In 1983, longstanding peace was broken when young warriors on both sides began killing one another. As a result, pastoralists in Lapur were unable to reach the lake with their animals, and by 1992 a mass movement of people from Lapur and Todenyang increased the population of Lowarengak by over 30,000. Another cause of flight to Lowarengak included severe drought. Many of the inhabitants who had previously raised livestock became fisherman in order to continue earning a living. Some who lived in Lowarengak later moved to Natole, continuing to flee the northern areas due to raids and pastoral conflict.

In 2013, hundreds of children were relocated to Lowarengak from Todenyang following large raids that also targeted schools.

== Fishing industry ==
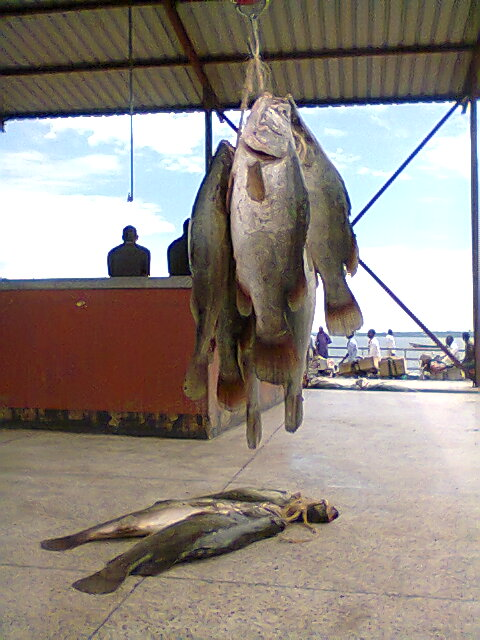
Nile perch, a common catch for Lowarengak fisherman.

Fish catches in Lowarengak derive from Lake Turkana and include a number of species. Most fish are various species of the Synodontis catfish genus, known locally as "Tirr", or the perch genus Lates, including the Nile perch known as "iji." Other fish include Labeobarbus bynni ("Momwara"), Schilbe catfish ("Nail"), Hydrocynus tigerfish ("Lokel"), and Bagrus catfish ("Loruk").

The growth of the Lowarengak fishing industry was encouraged by the Kenyan government and led to the emergence of a trading economy. Many women began work as traders, transporting catch from lake Turkana to Lodwar. By 2009 the fishing industry around Lowarengak and nearby communities was reported to have grown to include 100,000 people, with numbers highest during droughts. Fish from Lowarengak and surrounding areas are exported as far as Lokichoggio, Kakuma, Kitale, Busia, Bunyala, Kisumu, Bungoma, Mumias, Siaya, Kakamega, and Eldoret.

== See also ==
- Lokitaung
