= Kenyans for Kenya =

Non-profit charity fundraiser

- Formation: 2011
- Type: Charity
- Purpose: Fundraiser for famine and deaths from starvation

The "Kenyans for Kenya" initiative is a fundraiser that was started in July 2011 by corporate leaders and the Red Cross in response to media reports of famine and deaths from starvation in Turkana County. $10M was raised.
