= Turkana East Constituency =

Electoral constituency of Kenya

Turkana East
- constituency for the Parliament of Kenya
- Turkana East Constituency within Turkana County

- Turkana County within Kenya
- County: Turkana County
- Population: 138,526
- Area: 11,396 km^{2} (4,400.0 sq mi)

Current constituency
- Number of members: One
- Party: Jubilee Party
- Member of Parliament: Ngikolong Nicholas Ngikor Nixon

Turkana East is a constituency in Kenya. It is one of six constituencies of Turkana County.
