= Lodwar =

- Town
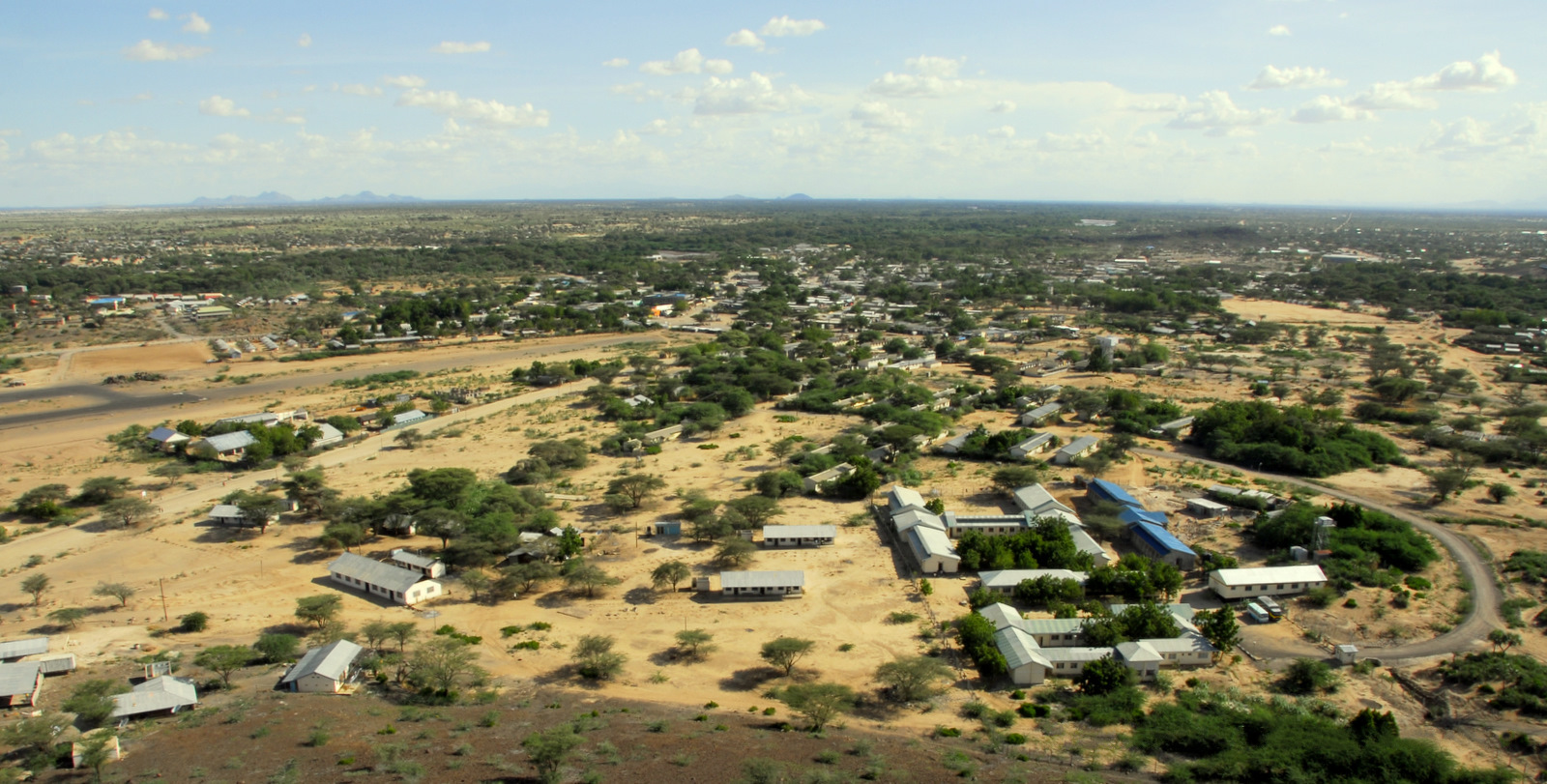
- View of Lodwar from the Hill

- Location in Kenya
- Coordinates: 03°07′N 35°36′E
- Country: Kenya
- County: Turkana County
- Elevation: 477 m (1,565 ft)

Population (2019)
  - Total: 82,970
  - Religions: Christian

Lodwar is the largest town in north-western Kenya, located west of Lake Turkana on the A1 road. The main industries are basket weaving and tourism. The Loima Hills lie to the west. Lodwar is the capital of Turkana County. The town had a population of 82,970 in the 2019 census.

== History ==
According to the Insider’s guide to Kenya, Lodwar's history began around 1933 when a trader named Shah Mohamed arrived on the banks of the Turkwell River. The roads were poor, so he brought donkeys. He eventually built a permanent trading centre in Lodwar, including a gas station. The district commissioner's office was built, followed by a small medical clinic and a government prison. Police headquarters were built in Lokitaung, as tribal disputes were common in the area.

In the 1960s, missionaries built schools in and around the town. Shah Mohamed opened several stores in the remote towns of Turkana county because he was the only contractor and supplier to government departments, carried mail to the area, and supplied and transported goods for the Norwegian and Italian fish-canning projects on Lake Turkana (both of which eventually failed).

During the colonial period, Lodwar functioned as a transit point for British officials moving Kenyan political prisoners to the north. Jomo Kenyatta, Kenya's first president, was restricted to house arrest for two years in Lodwar, beginning in 1959. The town had developed a reputation as an isolated outpost removed from the rest of Kenya, but in recent years Lodwar has expanded and gained commercial and economic prominence.

== Overview ==
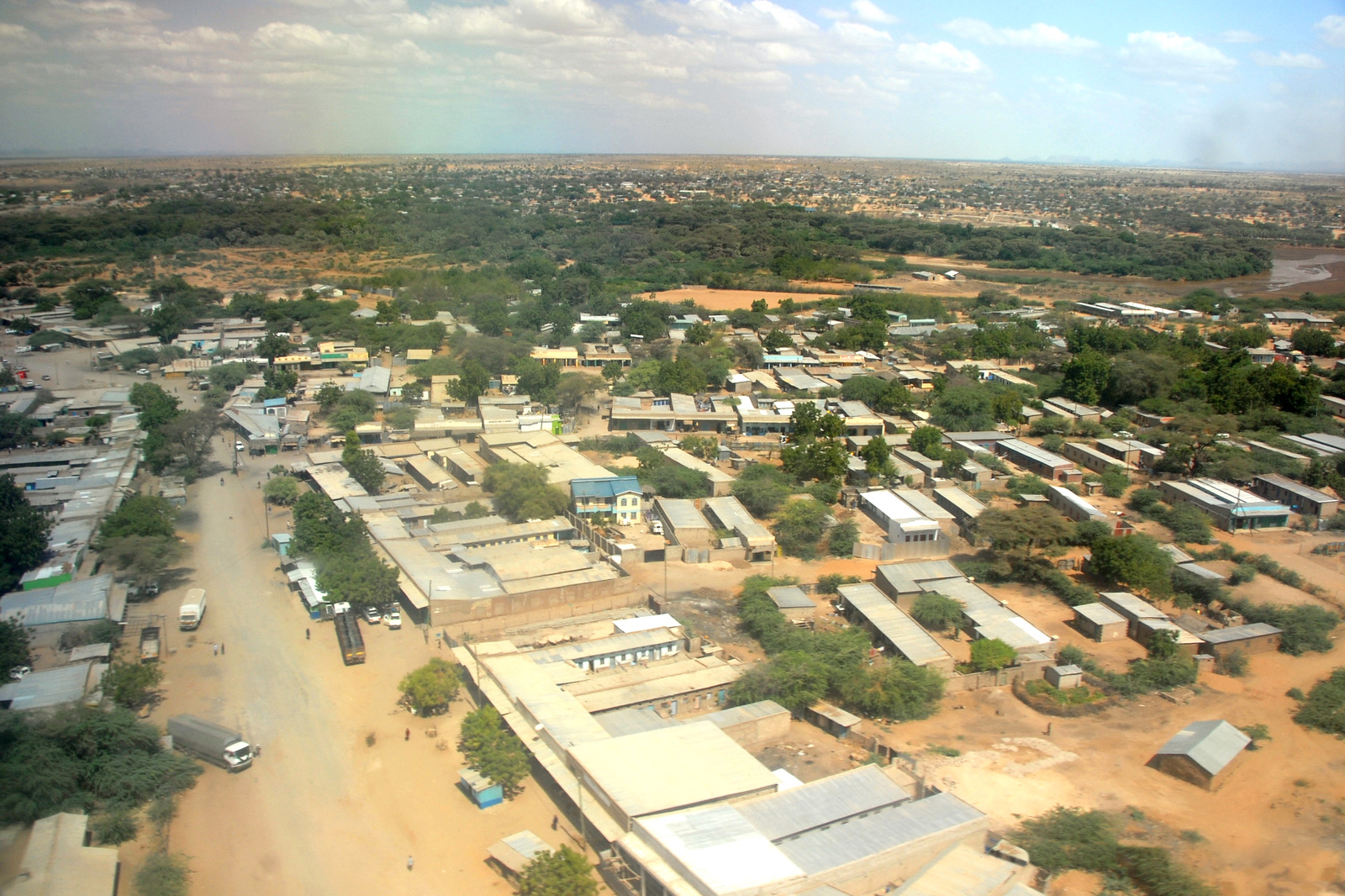
View of Lodwar when landing

Lodwar is considered the capital of the region, housing local and governmental facilities, including Turkana's biggest health facility and the main referral hospital, Lodwar County Hospital (LDH). It is also the seat of the Roman Catholic Diocese of Lodwar. The town is served by Lodwar Airport. The Turkana Geothermal Power Station is under construction about 170 kilometres away.

== Climate ==
Lodwar has a hot desert climate (Köppen climate classification BWh) with very high temperatures and very little rainfall throughout the year. The average annual rainfall is about 210 mm (8.27 in). Lodwar has a very sunny climate year-round, with close to 3,600 hours of sunshine per year.

Climate data for Lodwar (1991–2020 normals, extremes 1920–present)
Month	Jan	Feb	Mar	Apr	May	Jun	Jul	Aug	Sep	Oct	Nov	Dec	Year
Record high °C (°F)	39.8 (103.6)	40.0 (104.0)	40.6 (105.1)	40.3 (104.5)	39.0 (102.2)	37.4 (99.3)	38.3 (100.9)	37.0 (98.6)	39.0 (102.2)	38.4 (101.1)	39.9 (103.8)	39.3 (102.7)	40.6 (105.1)
Mean daily maximum °C (°F)	36.4 (97.5)	37.5 (99.5)	37.1 (98.8)	35.9 (96.6)	35.6 (96.1)	34.6 (94.3)	33.8 (92.8)	34.3 (93.7)	35.6 (96.1)	35.9 (96.6)	35.4 (95.7)	35.5 (95.9)	35.6 (96.1)
Daily mean °C (°F)	29.3 (84.7)	30.2 (86.4)	30.6 (87.1)	30.2 (86.4)	30.3 (86.5)	29.6 (85.3)	29.1 (84.4)	29.5 (85.1)	30.4 (86.7)	30.7 (87.3)	29.8 (85.6)	29.0 (84.2)	29.9 (85.8)
Mean daily minimum °C (°F)	22.1 (71.8)	22.9 (73.2)	24.0 (75.2)	24.7 (76.5)	25.2 (77.4)	24.5 (76.1)	24.4 (75.9)	24.6 (76.3)	25.2 (77.4)	25.4 (77.7)	24.0 (75.2)	22.3 (72.1)	24.1 (75.4)
Record low °C (°F)	15.0 (59.0)	12.6 (54.7)	15.2 (59.4)	14.3 (57.7)	15.5 (59.9)	17.4 (63.3)	18.6 (65.5)	19.2 (66.6)	19.2 (66.6)	15.3 (59.5)	13.5 (56.3)	14.5 (58.1)	12.6 (54.7)
Average precipitation mm (inches)	8.6 (0.34)	9.5 (0.37)	18.9 (0.74)	58.0 (2.28)	21.3 (0.84)	7.6 (0.30)	20.2 (0.80)	8.9 (0.35)	5.1 (0.20)	10.2 (0.40)	28.4 (1.12)	14.0 (0.55)	210.7 (8.30)
Average precipitation days (≥ 1.0 mm)	1	1	2	4	2	1	2	1	1	1	2	1	19
Average relative humidity (%)	38	39	41	50	50	47	48	46	42	41	44	41	44
Mean monthly sunshine hours	316.2	271.6	288.3	258.0	310.0	306.0	306.9	306.9	306.0	306.9	288.0	313.1	3,577.9
Mean daily sunshine hours	10.2	9.7	9.3	8.6	10.0	10.2	9.9	9.9	10.2	9.9	9.6	10.1	9.8
Source 1: NOAA (precipitation and sun 1961–1990)
Source 2: Deutscher Wetterdienst (humidity 1961–1990), Meteo Climat (record highs and lows)

== Issues ==
Only about 35 percent of citizens in Lodwar have access to electricity in their homes. The Lodwar Alluvial Aquifer comprises two unique systems east and west of the Lodwar municipality, on either side of the Turkwel River. Almost 1.3 billion cubic meters can be stored here with about 10% that can be utilized without causing unacceptable environmental, economic and social challenges. There is one shallow groundwater system in the region hosting potable freshwater, though residents experience intermittent water shortages resulting in livestock death. Many people are predominantly nomadic pastoralists.
