= Lokichogio Airport =

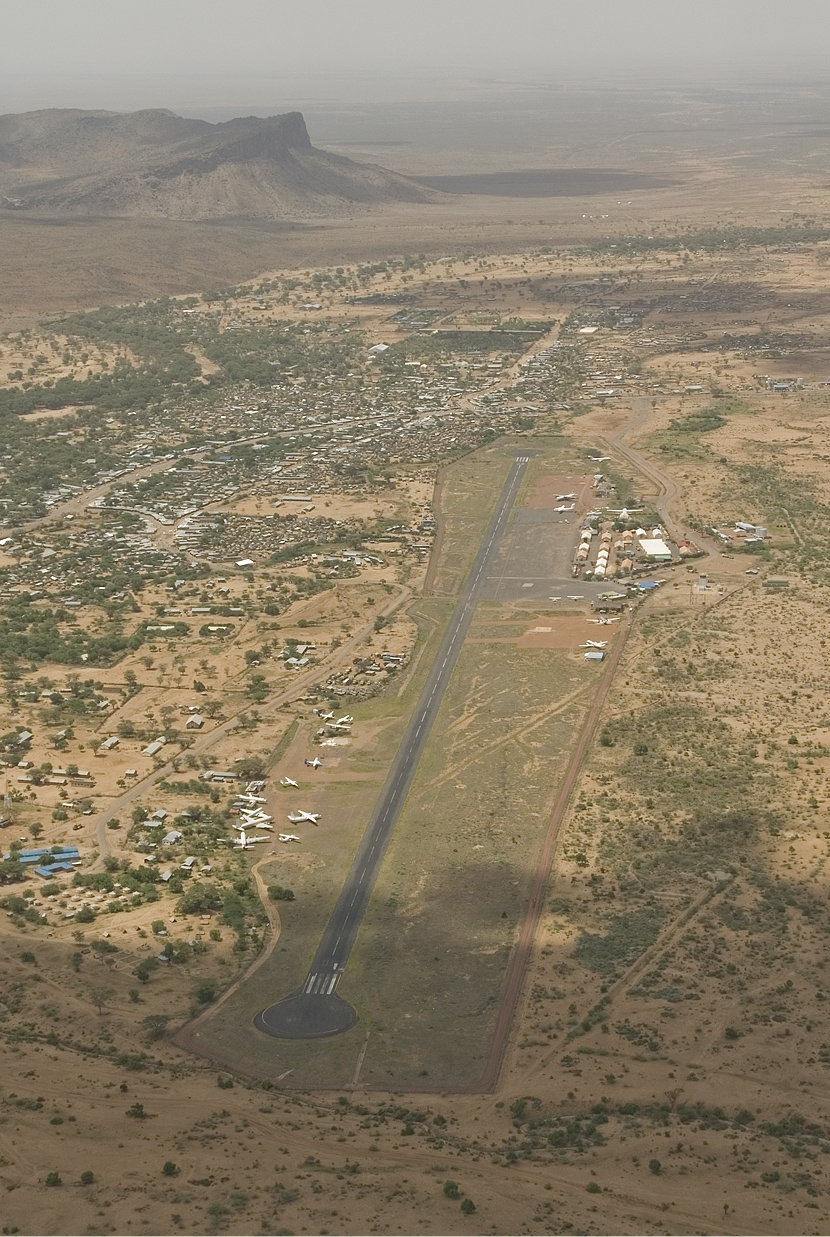
- Lokichogio Airport runway
- IATA: LKG; ICAO: HKLK

Summary
- Airport type: Public, Civilian
- Owner: Kenya Civil Aviation Authority
- Serves: Lokichogio, Kenya
- Location: Lokichogio, Kenya
- Elevation AMSL: 2,116 ft (645 m)
- Coordinates: 04°12′18″N 034°20′42″E

Map
- Location of Lokichogio Airport in Kenya

Runways
Direction	Length		Surface
Direction	ft	m	Surface
09/27	6,194	1,888	Asphalt

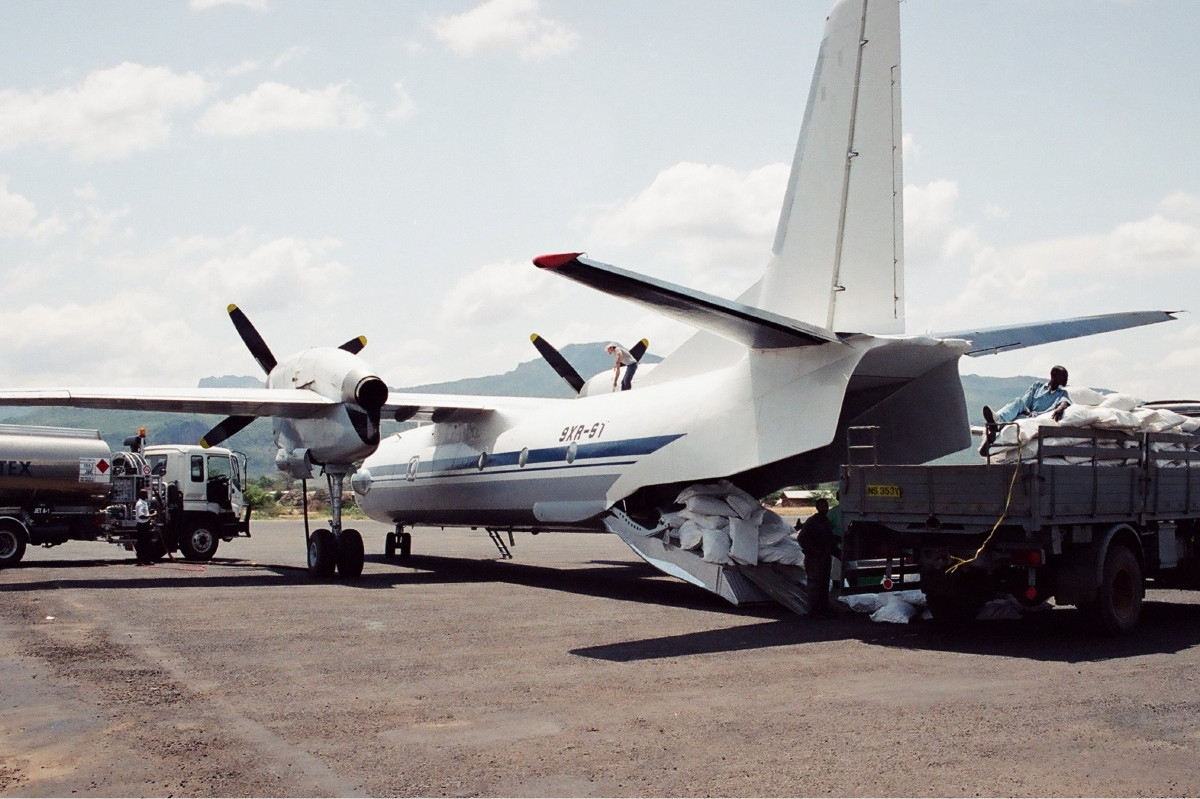
Antonov An-32 at Lokichogio airport

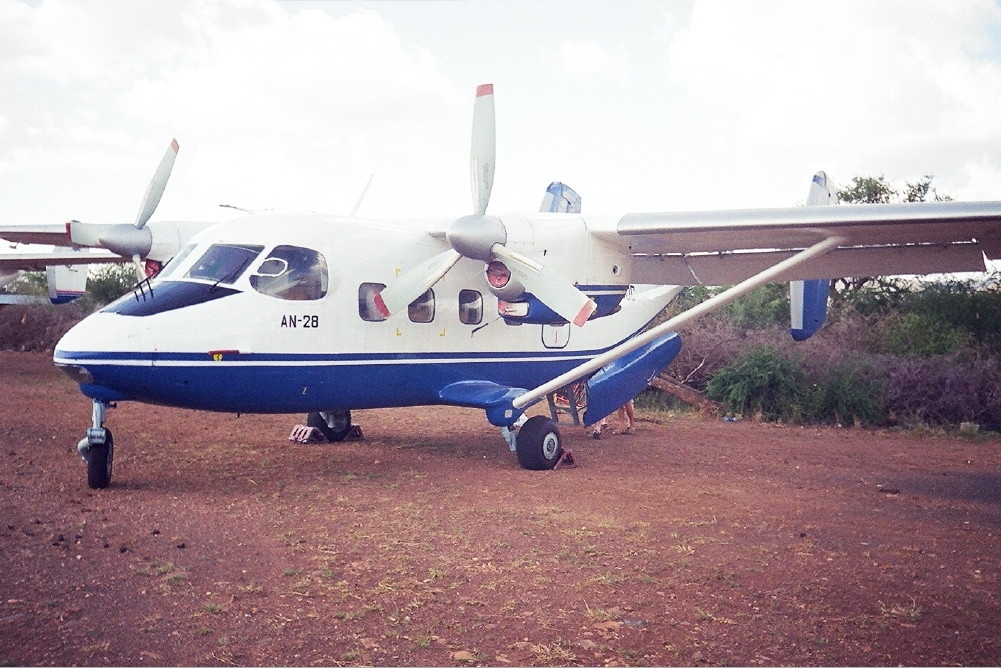
Antonov An-28 at Lokichogio Airport

Lokichogio Airport is an airport in Lokichogio, Kenya.

== Location ==
Lokichogio Airport (IATA: LKG, ICAO: HKLK) is located in Turkana County, in the town of Lokichogio, in the northwestern corner of the Republic of Kenya, close to the International borders with South Sudan and Uganda. Its location is approximately 678 kilometres (421 mi), by air, northwest of Jomo Kenyatta International Airport.

== Overview ==
Lokichogio Airport is a civilian airport that serves the town of Lokichogio and surrounding communities. The airport is home to one of the world's largest and longest running humanitarian aid projects. Global aid projects are run by aid groups such as the United Nations, UNICEF, and the World Food Programme to the neighbouring country of South Sudan. The airport is now home to a number of different aircraft ranging from the Lockheed Hercules to the de Havilland DHC-5 Buffalo. Many of the charities based at Lokichoggio work in collaboration with the Sudanese People's Liberation Army (SLPA), the armed forces of the Republic of South Sudan.

Situated at 645 metres (2,116 ft) above sea level, the airport has a single asphalt runway of 1,888 metres (6,194 ft) long and 19 metres (62 ft) wide.

== Airlines and destinations ==
Airlines	Destinations
Aircraft Leasing Services	Lodwar, Nairobi–Wilson, Rumbek

== Accidents and incidents ==
- On 7 November 1993, Aero Modifications International DC-3-65TP ZS-KCV of Professional Aviation Services, was damaged beyond repair in a take-off accident.

== See also ==
- Kenya Airports Authority
- Kenya Civil Aviation Authority
- List of airports in Kenya
- Lokichogio
- Rift Valley Province
- Turkana District
