= Lokichogio =

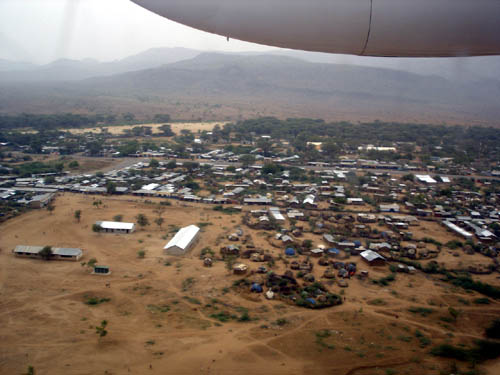

- Location within Kenya
- Coordinates: 4.2°N 34.35°E
- Country: Kenya
- County: Turkana County
- Time zone: UTC+3 (EAT)

Lokichogio (also Lokichoggio or Lokichokio), is a town in Turkana County in northwest Kenya (4°12′00″N 34°21′00″E). It is often called Loki for short. The town lies on the A1 road, and is served by the Lokichogio Airport.

It is about 30 kilometers from the international border with South Sudan and hosts the UN offices (part of the Operation Lifeline Sudan program), around 49 NGOs, and a large orthopedic hospital run by the ICRC.

== History ==
During the war (1983–2005) between what is now Southern Sudan to include Nuba Mountains, South Kordafan Province (technically now in Sudan), Loki was the singular re-supply logistics point for the SPLA. Many flights originated from Loki to re-supply SPLA units in Nuba Mountains under the leadership of Abdel Azziz. IO and NGO's to include support from Uganda, Kenya, USA, Norway (Norwegian People's Aid/NPA) and others were most prominent in supporting the SPLA/M. (Note: "M" or "movement" denotes the political representation of the Sudan People's Liberation Army)

During the interim cease fire in early 2002 in Nuba Mountains, non-lethal logistical supplies were authorized by the government in Sudan at that time, termed the National Islamic Front (NIF) and now termed the National Congress Party (NCP). The only medical facility, as previously mentioned, was in Loki; anyone requiring medical attention had to be flown from Nuba Mountains, near Kauda to Loki.

In one case in early May 2002, a double stacked anti-tank mine(s) detonated just prior to the visit of Abdel Azziz killing two and wounding three other SPLA advisers. According to Randolph Hampton, an adviser on the ground in Nuba Mountains with the Sudan People's Liberation Army/SPLA; one of the injured was Major Tutu, SPLA's higher ranking officers. Major Tutu and two others were air evacuated after stripping the plane of seats; unfortunately, Major Tutu and one other died en route to Loki's ICRC hospital due to lack of blood.

Today, Nuba Mountains remains aligned with Southern Sudan and Abdel Azziz is currently in Nuba Mountains, as late 2019 supporting the efforts to bring sustained peace and security to the nearly 1.5 million Nuba Mountains population.

== Geography ==
Loki is the outermost Kenyan town on the border with South Sudan. Kenyans from the southern part of Loki, however, maintain that Lodwar is the last truly "Kenyan" town in the region, about 200 kilometers south. At the north end of Loki, beyond the noted dry river bed, the Kenya Defence Forces had set up a border checkpoint. This was initially considered the "true" border between Kenya and Sudan but was later moved in 2009 to a new checkpoint 2 km to Nadapal, the new checkpoint is guarded by the Kenya Police officers, Border police unit and the Immigration department. The Sudanese checkpoint is 2 km away from this newly constructed checkpoint. The area known as "no-man's land" is situated between these two checkpoints.

The Middle East Reformed Fellowship maintains a base here to administer diaconal aid to Sudan, a training centre for pastors and elders from Sudan, Kenya, and surrounding areas, and a broadcasting centre that prepares messages in the Dinka and Nuer languages.

== Demographics ==
Local people are mainly nomads of the Turkana tribe and derive their livelihood by looking after indigenous cattle. Ninety kilometers south of Loki is Kakuma, one of the largest refugee camps in Kenya. Refugees from Sudan, Ethiopia, Somalia, the DRC, and several other surrounding countries can be found in Kakuma.

== Education ==
Lokichogio Mixed Secondary School is in the community.

== In fiction ==
The town has been mentioned several times in pieces of fiction dealing with UN and NGO aid activity there. It was featured in the John Le Carré book on which the 2005 film The Constant Gardener was based, and served as the setting for much of Philip Caputo's novel, Acts of Faith.
