= Lokitaung =

- Location within Kenya
- Coordinates: 4.27°N 35.75°E
- Country: Kenya
- County: Turkana County
- Time zone: UTC+3 (EAT)

Lokitaung is a settlement in Kenya's Turkana County, a few kilometres northwest Lake Turkana. Lokitaung is the site of the 36-million year old Lokitaung Basalt lava flows, which lay atop Cretaceous sediments including dinosaur bones. The basalts are over 1 kilometre thick, and approximately 100 kilometres wide.

== Geography ==
Lokitaung is located in northern Kenya near the Ethiopian border, and bounded by Lake Turkana to the east, and the larger part of the Lapur range to the west. Lokitaung sits within a portion of range, is immediately inland and west of Lowarengak, south of Todonyang and north of Kangamajoj village. The Kachoda area lies to the northwest. Lokitaung is surrounded by extensive plains called Ngikalapatan in Turkana.

== Geology ==
Nearby geological features include the Lokitaung Gorge and the Lubur Sandstone sedimentary sequence, more than 500 metres (1,600 ft) thick. The Lubur Sandstone likely dates to the Cretaceous age of the Mesozoic, and includes dinosaur, turtle and crocodilian fossil bones.

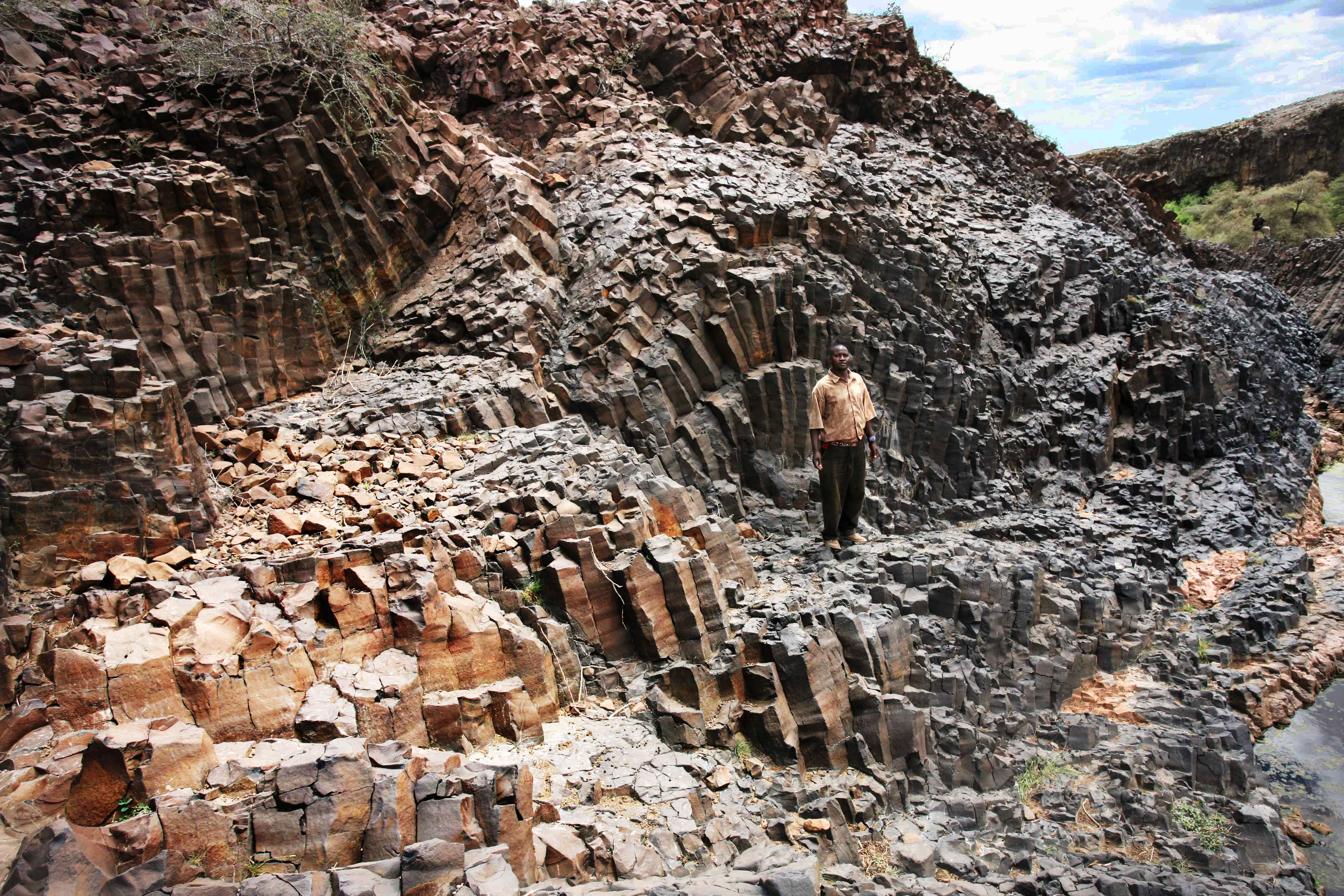
Turkana basalt columns, of the kind observed in the Lokitaung basalts.

In the Lokitaung gorge, these sediments are overlain by over 1,000 metres (3,300 ft) of basalt lava flows extending to the west of Lokitaung, called the Lokitaung basalts. Each flow is up to 50 metres (160 ft) thick, and many display characteristic columnar jointing. The basalts have been dated to 36 million years ago, though it is apparent from other, nearby flows that volcanism continued after the Lokitaung basalts formed.

While the Lokitaung basalts are thought to extend over 100 kilometres (62 mi) latitudinally, their full range is not known. Similarities in age and composition between Lokitaung basalts on the west of Lake Turkana, and basalts from the Nabwal hills and formation on the east of the lake, suggest these two basalts were once much closer geographically. In the 36 million years since their formation, rifting may have subsequently separated them by as much as 25 to 90 kilometres (16 to 56 mi), depending on their original locations during eruption.

== Climate ==
Lokitaung has a borderline hot arid climate (Köppen BWh) bordering on a hot semi-arid climate (BSh). The weather is consistently hot all year round and dry except during the main rainy season from March to May, although a secondary maximum occurs in November.

Climate data for Lokitaung (1933-1970)
Month	Jan	Feb	Mar	Apr	May	Jun	Jul	Aug	Sep	Oct	Nov	Dec	Year
Mean daily maximum °C (°F)	33.4 (92.1)	33.9 (93.0)	33.6 (92.5)	31.0 (87.8)	31.1 (88.0)	31.4 (88.5)	30.8 (87.4)	30.6 (87.1)	31.8 (89.2)	32.0 (89.6)	32.0 (89.6)	32.1 (89.8)	32.0 (89.6)
Daily mean °C (°F)	27.9 (82.2)	28.4 (83.1)	28.3 (82.9)	26.2 (79.2)	26.6 (79.9)	26.7 (80.1)	26.1 (79.0)	25.9 (78.6)	26.9 (80.4)	27.0 (80.6)	27.0 (80.6)	27.1 (80.8)	27.0 (80.6)
Mean daily minimum °C (°F)	22.4 (72.3)	22.9 (73.2)	23.0 (73.4)	21.3 (70.3)	22.1 (71.8)	21.9 (71.4)	21.3 (70.3)	21.2 (70.2)	22.0 (71.6)	21.9 (71.4)	21.9 (71.4)	22.1 (71.8)	22.0 (71.6)
Average rainfall mm (inches)	12 (0.5)	23 (0.9)	54 (2.1)	122 (4.8)	50 (2.0)	19 (0.7)	31 (1.2)	13 (0.5)	6 (0.2)	14 (0.6)	41 (1.6)	26 (1.0)	409 (16.1)

== Settlement ==
Between 1913 and 1931, Sudanese troops operating in Northern Kenya and southern Sudan suffered from four outbreaks of Visceral leishmaniasis, or Kala-azar, including one in Lokitaung. The exact site of the outbreak was thought to be at the Moru-Yakippi watering hole, later called Loelli. In 1941, an outbreak of Kala-azar struck soldiers from the King's African Rifles while they were stationed in Nyeri after they had passed through Lokitaung.

In 1958-9, the British government placed a prison in Lokitaung, where Mau Mau prisoners reportedly received very harsh treatment. Accounts of cruel behavior and conditions reached the British press, who considered sending an investigative team. British colonial officials including Charles Ryland and Lennox-Boyde refused to allow any investigation or visit from the press. One British captain, E. Law, told British Labour MP John Stonehouse that British jailers were more sadistic than the Japanese who'd interned him "on the Burma-Siam Railway." Political efforts to investigate the jail never succeeded.

Today, Lokitaung prison grounds are used to host football matches by schoolchildren at Lokitaung and in surrounding communities.

In 2011, Lokitaung was one of a number of villages throughout Turkana that suffered from starvation, caused by a drought and associated famine.

Lokitaung includes a weather station operated by the Kenya Meteorological Department.

== See also ==
- Lowarengak
