= Turkana County =

Kenyan county

- County
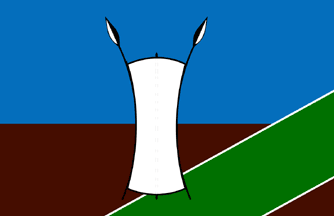
- Flag Coat of arms

- Location of Turkana County (red) including the disputed Elemi Triangle (diagonally striped red)
- Coordinates: 3°09′N 35°21′E
- Country: Kenya
- Formed: 4 March 2013
- Capital: Lodwar

Government
  - Governor: Jeremiah Ekamais Lomorukai Napotikan

Area
  - Total: 70,512 km^{2} (27,225 sq mi)
  - Land: 68,232.9 km^{2} (26,344.9 sq mi)
  - Water: 2,279 km^{2} (880 sq mi)
- Elevation: 1,138 m (3,734 ft)

Population (2024)
  - Total: 997,976
  - Density: 14.6260/km^{2} (37.8812/sq mi)

GDP (PPP)
  - Total: ▲$2.996 billion (30th)(2022)
  - Per Capita: ▲$3,005 (2022) (38th)

GDP (NOMINAL)
  - Total: ▲$1.100 billion (2022) (30th)
  - Per Capita: ▲1,103 (2022) (38th)
- Time zone: UTC+3 (EAT)
- Website: www.turkana.go.ke

Turkana County is a county in northwestern Kenya in the Northern Rift region. It is home to the Turkana people. It is Kenya's largest county by land area of 77,597.8 km^{2} followed by Marsabit County with an area of 66,923.1 km^{2}. It is bordered by the countries of Uganda to the west; South Sudan and Ethiopia, including the disputed Ilemi Triangle, to the north and northeast; and Lake Turkana to the east. To the south and east, neighbouring counties in Kenya are West Pokot, Baringo and Samburu Counties, while Marsabit County is on the opposite (i.e. eastern) shore of Lake Turkana. Turkana's capital and largest town is Lodwar. The county had a population of 926,976 according to the 2019 census report. It was projected to reach 1.048 million people in 2024.

== History ==
Four sites of Stone Age cultures are situated on tributaries along the west side of Lake Turkana in West Turkana at Lokalalei, Kokiselei and Nadungu. They have been of interest to archaeologists since 1988.

The earliest late Stone Age industries in prehistory were found in Turkana, at the site of Lomekwi, and date to 3,300,000 years. At the archaeological site of Nataruk, in southwest Turkana, scientists have discovered the oldest evidence of inter-group conflict in the past, establishing that warfare occurred between groups of hunter-gatherers.

From 1900 until 1926, the British colonial administration in Kenya gradually established control over the Turkana people. and by 1926, the Turkana people were fully under the control of the British colonial administration, who subsequently forcibly restricted their movements to the Turkana region.

In 1958, the district experienced an influx of people classified as belonging to the Turkana group. These had been expelled from the Kenyan town of Isiolo, and forcibly relocated to the Turkana district by the colonial administration.

The district maintained an all but complete isolation until 1976 when road-blocks leading to the district were lifted by the Kenyan government. It is still considered to be a "remote part" of the country.

In 2000, the people in the north of the county were reported as being harassed by marauding Ethiopians, and were consequently forced to relocate to southern areas.

== Demographics ==
=== Population ===
Historical population
Year	Pop.	±%
1979	142,702	—
1989	184,060	+29.0%
1999	450,860	+145.0%
2009	855,399	+89.7%
2019	926,976	+8.4%

=== Religion ===
Christianity is the largest religion in Turkana County, representing 86% of the population. Catholicism is the largest denomination with 44% of the population being Catholic and 28% being Protestant.

Religion in Turkana County (2019 Census)
Religion	Percentage
Christianity	86.97%
Catholicism	44.07%
Protestantism	28.82%
Evangelical Churches	9.47%
African Instituted Churches	2.44%
Orthodoxy	0.30%
Other Christian	1.87%
Islam	3.34%
Hindu	0.01%
Traditionalists	4.71%
Other	0.95%
Atheists	2.75%
Don't Know	1.22%
Not Stated	0.05%

Religion (2019 Census)	Number
Catholicism	406,439
Protestant	265,802
Evangelical Churches	87,298
African instituted Churches	22,498
Orthodox	2,806
Other Christian	17,210
Islam	30,776
Hindu	134
Traditionists	43,412
Other	8,773
Atheists	25,361
Don't Know	11,221
Not Stated	480

== Language ==
Turkana is known in the local language as ng'turkana. Some place names in the country are attributed to the language of the Pokot and Samburu peoples, representing a tradition in the area of inhabitation by these peoples prior to displacement by the Turkana.

== Geography ==
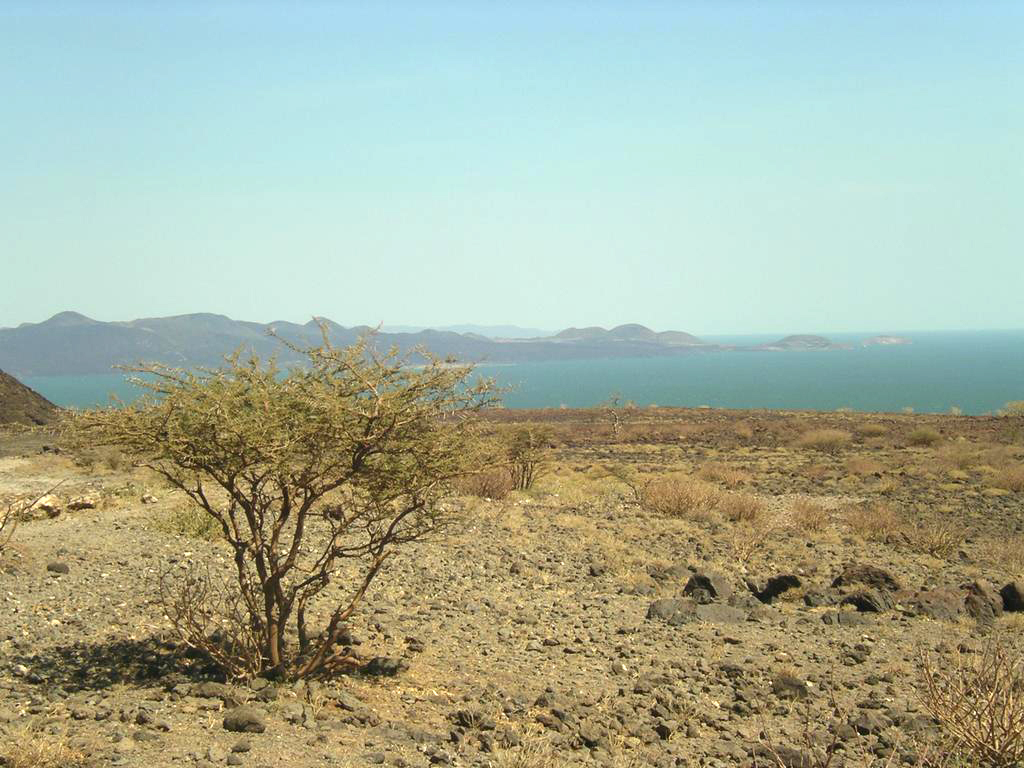
The climate of Turkana County is dry

The county is within the boundaries of the former Rift Valley province. According to data provided in 1991, the majority of the population were farmers. With an area of nearly 77,000 km^{2}, Turkana is the largest county, including the area covered by Lake Turkana, in Kenya.

Turkana County is emerging as a major source of electric power in Kenya. Kengen's Turkwel Hydro Power Plant, situated in the southwest of Turkana County, produces hydroelectric power connected to the national power grid at Lessos. The county is currently experiencing crude oil exploration in Block 10BB and Block 13T and has the potential for geothermal, solar and wind energy.

Kekarongole and Katilu had irrigation networks made commencing sometime during or after 1975.

Rainfall per annum (1982 data), is less than 250 mm (10 in), with a range of between 115 mm and 650 mm.

There were thirteen drought periods in a period of 50 years beginning 1938.

== Economics ==
Turkana is the poorest region in Kenya. The county is, however, experiencing upward reviews due to ongoing mineral exploration, especially of oil and water resources. Turkana County residents are also enjoying the fruits of devolution. Devolution of power in Kenya is viewed as a blessing for the forgotten people of Turkana. It has been received in the sub-counties with much appreciation due to its direct benefits to citizens. The current administration shares these benefits equally to all sub counties in addition to enhancing citizen participation in development activities.

On 26 March 2012, Kenyan President Mwai Kibaki announced that oil had been discovered in Turkana County after exploratory drilling by Anglo-Irish firm Tullow Oil, he further stated that:

It is... the beginning of a long journey to make our country an oil producer, which typically takes in excess of three years. We shall be giving the nation more information as the oil exploration process continues.

Gold panning was reported (2005) as occurring at Lochoremoit, Namoruputh, Lokiriama and Ng' akoriyiek.

According to Barrett (2001) cited in Watson the wealth of a person is kept in the form of cattle.

Figures stated in 1998 gave an average estimated herd size of 15–20.

In 2013 it was announced by UNESCO that large reserves of groundwater had been discovered in Turkana County using satellite exploration technology, later confirmed by drilling. Extraction of the water began in 2014 and is being piped to Lodwar for irrigation and human consumption. However, this project was subsequently abandoned when it was found that the water in the aquifer was too salty to be treated or to be used for other purposes.

== Government ==
The promulgation of the Constitution of Kenya 2010 marked a momentous point in the country's history. The Constitution provided for, among others, enhanced checks and balances within the government, an enhanced role of Parliament and citizens, an independent judiciary, and a progressive Bill of Rights. Turkana County is one of the 47 counties of Kenya. The county is led by H.E. Governor Jeremiah Lomorukai, and Turkana County has 10 ministries.

== Travel ==
The county is connected to Nairobi through regular commercial flights to Lodwar Airport. The World Food Programme runs a special UN Humanitarian Air Service for UN and INGO staff.

== County subdivisions ==
Local authorities (councils)
Authority	Type	Population*	Urban pop.*
Lodwar	Municipality	1,000,000	16,981
Turkana	County	414,963	26,563
Total	–	450,860	43,544
* 1999 census. Source:

Administrative divisions
Division	Population*	Population density	Headquarters
Central	35,919	45	Lodwar
Kaaling	24,053	3	
Kainuk	11,799	7	Kainuk
Kakuma	97,114	26	Kakuma
Kalokol	28,735	5	Kalokol
Katilu	12,548	10	katilu
Kerio	15,409	6	
Kibish	6,056	–	
Lapur	12,780	6	
Lokichar	21,791	5	Lokichar
Lokichogio	36,187	5	Lokichogio
Lokitaung	22,586	12	Lokitaung
Loima	33,979	10	Lorugum
Lokori	17,915	3	
Lomelo	6,088	1	Kapedo
Oropol	18,020	3	Oropol
Turkwel	49,881	9	
Total	450,860	7 (average)	-
* 1999 census. Sources:

The county has six constituencies:

- Loima Constituency
- Turkana Central Constituency
- Turkana East Constituency
- Turkana North Constituency
- Turkana South Constituency
- Turkana West Constituency

The counties have six sub counties

sub-county	headquarters
Turkana Central	Lodwar
Turkana North	Lokitaung
Turkana South	Lokichar
Turkana East	Lokori
Turkana West	Kakuma
Loima	Lorugum

== Villages and settlements ==
- Anglogitat
- Angorangora

== See also ==
- Eliye Springs, a village located in Kalokol division
- Kenyans for Kenya
- Ilemi Triangle
