= East African Airways =

1946–1977 Kenyan, Tanzanian and Ugandan airline

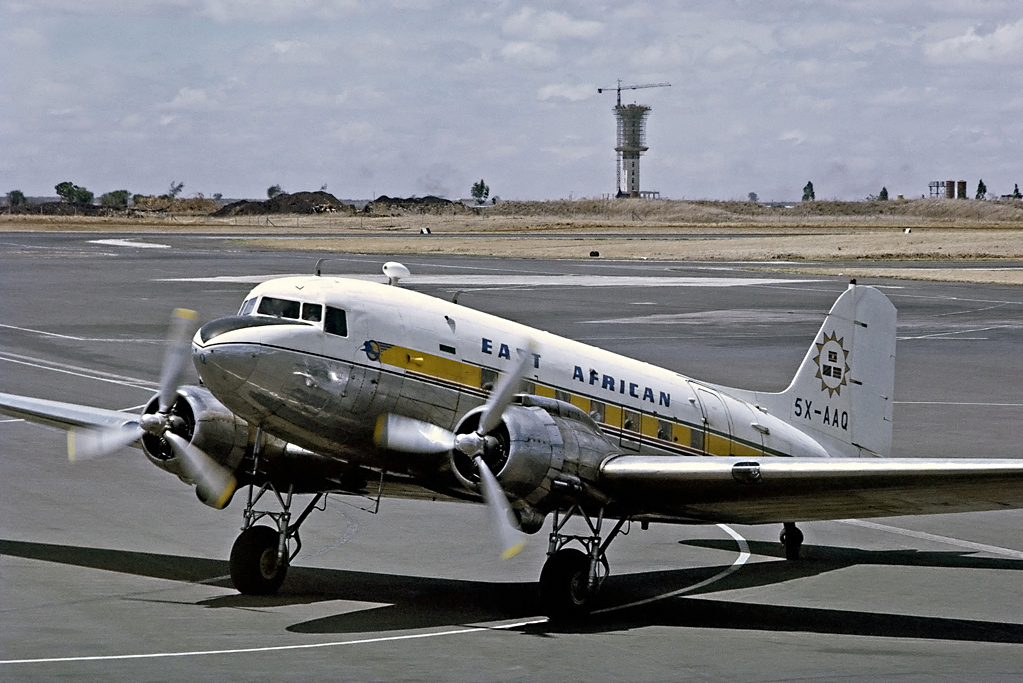
IATA	ICAO	Call sign
EC	EC	EASTAF
- Commenced operations: 1 January 1946
- Ceased operations: 1977
- Hubs: Embakasi Airport
- Secondary hubs: Dar es Salaam International Airport; Entebbe International Airport
- Subsidiaries: Simbair Ltd.
- Headquarters: Nairobi, Kenya

East African Airways Corporation, more commonly known as East African Airways, was an airline jointly run by Kenya, Tanzania, and Uganda. It was set up on 1 January 1946, starting operations the same year. The airline was headquartered in the Sadler House in Nairobi, Kenya. The corporation was dissolved in 1977 amid deteriorated relations among the three countries.

== History ==
=== Origins (1943–1945) ===
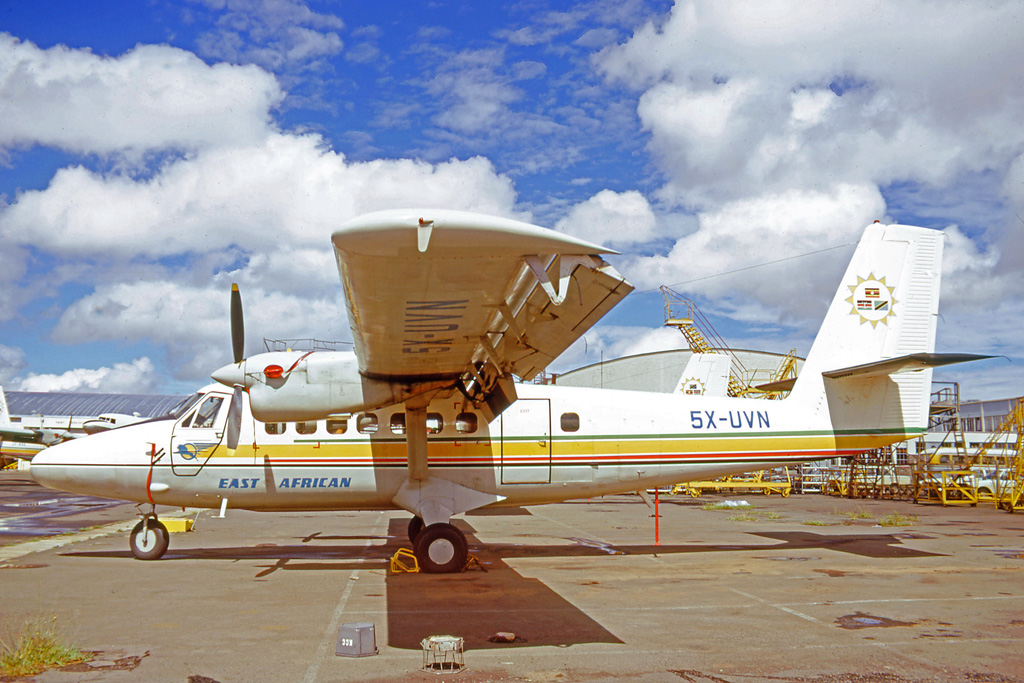
De Havilland Canada DHC-6 Twin Otter of EAA at Nairobi's Embakasi airport in 1973

The 1943 Conference of Governors of Britain's East African Territory was attended by government officials, aviation and railroad experts, businessmen, and British Overseas Airways Corporation (BOAC) officials. They formed a committee to plan for the handling of airline services following the end of the Second World War. Present at the meeting was Philip Euen Mitchell representing the Uganda Protectorate, who was the only governor interested in aviation that could also provide his expertise after an airport in Kampala was established by him. It was believed by the governors that the promotion and control of civil aviation should be run by a single enterprise, which would provide feeder flights, connect intermediate points along the trunk lines, and operate local traffic and charter services. A £18,000–50,000 annual budget would be required. There were two different recommendations from the committee regarding the future company's fleet: 13 six-seater aircraft or nine six-seater aircraft and five DH 89 Dragon Rapides. No actions were taken until the war was over. Routes in the region were operated by BOAC using DH.89 equipment.

A draft proposal for the creation of the airline was made public in June 1945. The aims had changed a bit since 1943, but the needs for the formation of the company were almost intact. The enterprise that was about to be set up should link England with South Africa via Cairo, Khartoum, and Northern Rhodesia and Southern Rhodesia, should provide another trunk, yet slower, service departing from Nairobi to the south, should establish a link between East and West Africa via the Belgian Congo, should run feeder flights that connected with all the previous services, and charter operations should be undertaken as well. On 30 October 1945, the act that called for the creation of the East African Air Transport Authority, the organism that among other things would create East African Airways (EAA), was signed. With an initial £50,000 capital, ownership of the company was split between the Kenya Colony (67.7 percent), Uganda (22.6 percent), the Tanganyika Territory (9 percent), and Zanzibar (0.7 percent). BOAC provided management and technical expertise, and it was also hired to operate six Dragon Rapides. Charles Lockhart was the first chairman of the corporation.

=== Early years (1945–1950) ===
Following test flights in late 1945, operations started from Eastleigh Aerodrome, Nairobi on 1 January 1946. The regional Nairobi–Mombasa–Tanga–Zanzibar–Dar es Salaam–Nairobi, Dar es Salaam–Zanzibar–Tanga–Mombasa–Nairobi–Dar es Salaam, Nairobi–Moshi–Dar es Salaam–Nairobi, Nairobi–Kisumu–Entebbe–Nairobi, Nairobi–Eldoret–Kitale–Nairobi, Dar es Sallam–Zanzibar–Tanga–Dar es Salaam, Dar es Salaam–Lindi–Dar es Salaam, Dar es Salaam–Morogoro–Nduli–Southern Highlands–Chunya–Mbeya–Dar es Salaam routes opened on 3 April. Reginald Robbins succeeded Lockhart as chairman on 28 June 1946. Six more D.H.89As were purchased for £5,700 each. Doves were also ordered that year, but because these aircraft could not be delivered until 1948, the corporation arranged the delivery of Lodestars from BOAC for £6,000 each including spares. Despite the company expecting the Lodestars to arrive earlier, both types of aircraft arrived the same year, with five Lodestars entering the fleet on 22 February 1948 followed by the first of four Doves (at a cost of £13,300 each) four days later. The Lodestars were deployed on the Nairobi–Dar es Salaam service on 21 March, whereas the Doves started working on the Nairobi–Entebbe run on 14 April. A day later, Lodestars were deployed on the Nairobi–Mombasa–Lindi service.

Alfred Vincent succeeded Robbins as chairman on 1 January 1949. That year, the carrier's capital was increased from £50,000 to £221,500. Three more Lodestars from Sabena in the Belgian Congo joined the fleet in June. EAA had operated a service to the Congo in conjunction with Sabena, but the route was dropped because of poor economical performance. On 26 October, the first DC-3 Dakota was phased in, with its first service being a charter flight to Uranbo on 5 November. Likewise, the Nairobi–Durban coastal service route that had hitherto been operated by Skyways Limited was taken over by EAA on 2 November, with a D.H.89 flying the first run. Figures for 1949 showed an increase of 63 percent, year-on-year, for passenger traffic, with cargo and mail increasing by 81 percent and 28 percent, respectively.

=== 1950s ===
Once-weekly Nairobi–Mbeya–Salisbury DC-3 service was launched in August 1950, but the route was suspended the following year because of stiff competition from airlines like Central African Airways and South African Airways (SAA). That year, the first Dove was sold due to the poor performance of the aircraft in hot and high conditions. Three more aircraft of this type exited the fleet in 1951. The Doves were soon replaced with seven ex-SAA Lockheed L-18-08 Lodestars that were subsequently converted to the L-18-56 model by replacing their engines with Wright Cyclone G.205A ones.

On 6 February 1952, following the death of King George VI, Queen Elizabeth II began her return to the United Kingdom on one of EAA's newer aircraft, a DC–3 with registration VP-KHK. She was carried from Nanyuki to Entebbe, where she connected with a BOAC aircraft. This event marked EAA as being the first airline not based in the United Kingdom to carry a reigning monarch. During 1952, six more DC-3s were purchased. Aimed at replacing the Dragon Rapides, three Macchi M320s were acquired, but these aircraft proved to be inadequate for the airline's operations and were phased out and sold. Also during 1952, the airline commenced the flying of pilgrims to and from Mecca in conjunction with Aden Airways. By that time, the airline had decided to replace the Lodestars with more DC-3s, with all ten of them being sold between late 1952 and early 1953. The last service flown with these aircraft was in February 1953. The original three DC-3s were sold, but four new aircraft of the type were acquired. A Consolidated PBY Catalina was purchased in 1953. It was used in the filming of Mogambo and sold the next year.

In early 1957, services to the United Kingdom were launched on a once-weekly basis, at first operated by BOAC on EAA's behalf and then in EAA's own right with ex-BOAC Argonauts. This tourist-class service had low load factors when it was started, as it competed with same-fare BOAC Britannias and Viscounts. Also in early 1957, the Nairobi–Aden route was started; in mid-September the same year the route was extended farther east, from Aden to Bombay via Karachi, and Argonauts were also deployed on it.

Following the opening of Embakasi Airport on 9 March 1958, EAA started transferring all their operations from Wilson Aerodrome to the new airport. Upon moving their DC-3 operations in July of the same year, all scheduled services operated from Embakasi, becoming their hub since.

=== 1960s ===
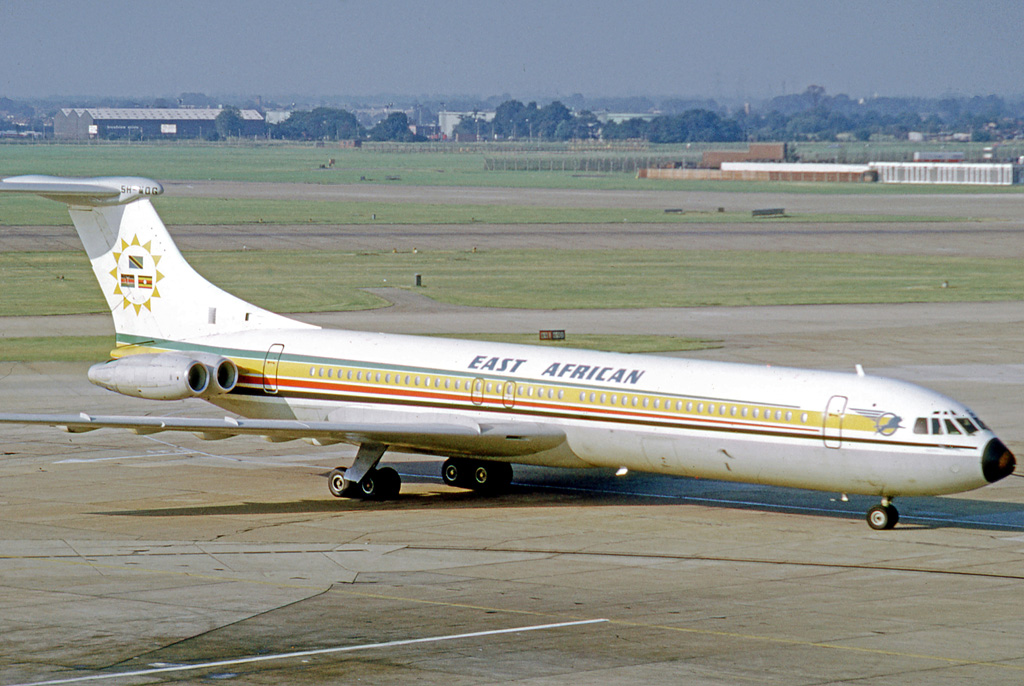
Vickers VC-10 of EAA arriving at London Heathrow Airport from Nairobi in July 1973

In 1960, two Comets ordered by the corporation in 1958 were put into service on the London–Rome–Khartoum–Entebbe–Nairobi, London–Rome–Khartoum–Nairobi–Dar es Salaam, and Nairobi–Aden–Karachi–Bombay routes. The same year, EAA reactivated Seychelles-Kilimanjaro Air Transport, a 1952-founded airline otherwise known as "SKAT" that had previously ceased operations, as a wholly owned subsidiary that flew some routes for EAA. SKAT was later re-christened Simbair Ltd when it was decided that EAA would no longer operate charter services; the renaming effectively took place in May 1971 and became an EAA's wholly owned subsidiary that took over SKAT and EAA passenger and cargo charter operations.

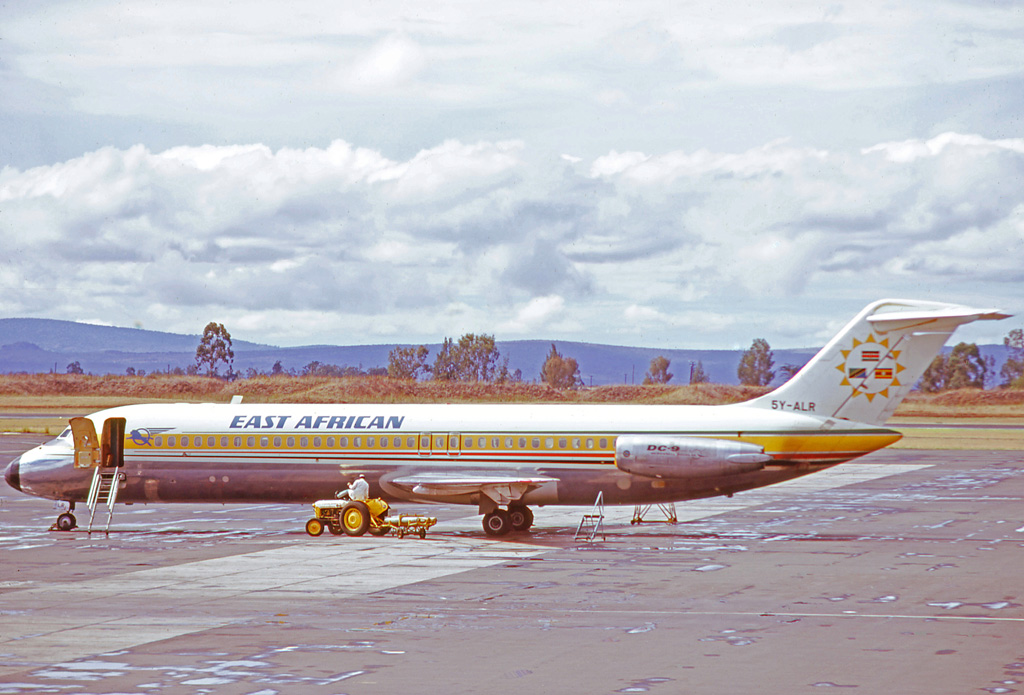
East African Airways Douglas DC-9-32 at Nairobi Airport in 1973

In the early 1960s, the airline ran short of capacity and the fleet was growing old. Three Fokker F27s were ordered as a replacement for the DC-3s and the Argonauts. The airline had not yet taken delivery of the third of these aircraft, when in late 1962 a fourth was ordered. In May 1965, an order for three VC-10s worth £11 million (equivalent to £260 million or US$333 million in 2024) was placed. Likewise, another VC-10 was ordered in 1969.

In late 1968 a number of De Havilland DHC-6 Twin Otters were added to the EAA fleet for the operation of domestic services from smaller airfields in East Africa.

=== 1970s and end ===
By March 1975, employment was 4,700. At this time, the fleet consisted of sixteen aircraft (five DC-3s, three DC-9-30s, four F.27s, and four Vickers Super VC10s) that worked an extensive domestic network within the three member countries plus international services to Aden, Addis Ababa, Athens, Blantyre, Bombay, Bujumbura, Cairo, Copenhagen, Frankfurt, Karachi, Kigali, Kinshasa, London, Lourenço Marques, Lusaka, Mauritius, Mogadishu, Rome, Seychelles, Tananarive, and Zürich. Management assistance from Aer Lingus was contracted in mid-1976 amid deteriorating relations between the three countries that ran the airline. Financial difficulties deepened when both Tanzania and Uganda struggled or failed to pay their outstanding debts for the operations of the airline. EAA operations came to a total halt in January 1977. The airline had incurred in debt of $120 million (equivalent to $528 million in 2025) when it went into liquidation in February 1977, with the Kenyan government being one of the major creditors. Both Kenya and Uganda had established their own national airlines before the folding of the corporation, with Uganda Airlines forming in 1976 and Kenya Airways in 1977. Tanzania followed in April 1977 with the formation of Air Tanzania.

== Destinations ==
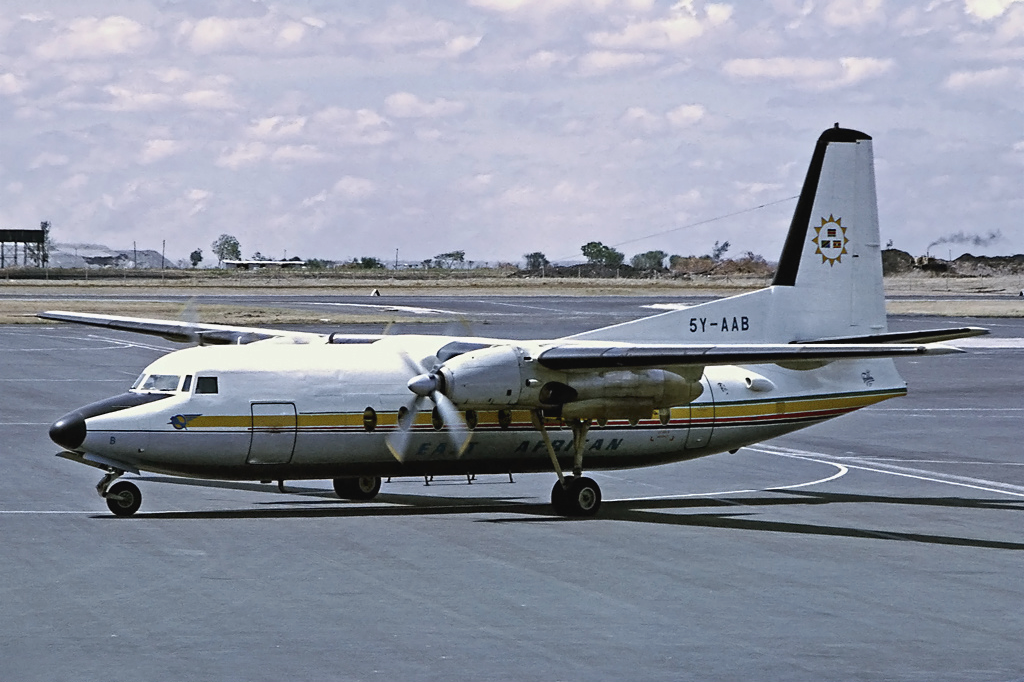
A Fokker F27-200 at Jomo Kenyatta International Airport, the airline's primary hub.

Following is a list of destinations East African Airways flew to as part of its scheduled services.

^{†}	Hub
^{‡}	Secondary hub

City	Country	IATA	ICAO	Airport	Refs
Abercorn	Zambia	MMQ	FLBA	Mbala Airport	
Addis Ababa	Ethiopia	ADD	HAAB	Bole International Airport	
Aden	Yemen	ADE	OYAA	Aden International Airport	
Athens	Greece	ATH	LGAT	Ellinikon International Airport	
Arua	Uganda	RUA	HUAR	Arua Airport	
Arusha	Tanzania	ARK	HTAR	Arusha Airport	
Beira	Mozambique	BEW	FQBR	Beira Airport	
Benghazi	Libya	BEN	HLLB	Benina International Airport	
Blantyre	Malawi	BLZ	FWCL	Chileka International Airport	
Bombay	India	BOM	VABB	Chhatrapati Shivaji International Airport	
Bujumbura	Burundi	BJM	HBBA	Bujumbura International Airport	
Dar es Salaam	Tanzania	DAR	HTDA	Dar es Salaam International Airport ^{‡}	
Dodoma	Tanzania	DOD	HTDO	Dodoma Airport	
Durban	South Africa	DUR	FADN	Durban International Airport	
Entebbe	Uganda	EBB	HUEN	Entebbe International Airport	
Frankfurt	Germany	FRA	EDDF	Frankfurt am Main Airport	
Gulu	Uganda	ULU	HUGU	Gulu Airport	
Hargeisa	Somalia	HGA	HCMH	Hargeisa International Airport	
Iringa	Tanzania	IRI	HTIR	Iringa Airport	
Jinja	Uganda	JIN	HUJI	Jinja Airport	
Karachi	Pakistan	KHI	OPKC	Jinnah International Airport	
Kasese	Uganda	KSE	HUKS	Kasese Airport	
Khartoum	Sudan	KRT	HSSS	Khartoum International Airport	
Kigali	Rwanda	KGL	HRYR	Kanombe International Airport	
Kigoma	Tanzania	TKQ	HTKA	Kigoma Airport	
Kilwa	Tanzania	KIY	HTKI	Kilwa Masoko Airport	
Kinshasa	Democratic Republic of the Congo	FIH	FZAA	N'djili Airport	
Kisumu	Kenya	KIS	HKKI	Kisumu Airport	
Kitale	Kenya	KTL	HKKT	Kitale Airport	
Lamu Island	Kenya	LAU	HKLU	Lamu Airport	
Lindi	Tanzania	LDI	HTLI	Lindi Airport	
London	United Kingdom	LHR	EGLL	London Heathrow Airport	
Lourenço Marques	Mozambique	MPM	FQMA	Lourenço Marques Airport	
Lusaka	Zambia	LUN	FLLS	Lusaka International Airport	
Mafia Island	Tanzania	MFA	HTMA	Mafia Airport	
Malindi	Kenya	MYD	HKML	Malindi Airport	
Mauritius	Mauritius	MRU	FIMP	Plaisance Airport	
Mbeya	Tanzania	MBI	HTMB	Mbeya Airport	
Mombasa	Kenya	MBA	HKMO	Mombasa International Airport	
Mombo	Tanzania	—	HTMO	Mombo Airstrip	
Mogadishu	Somalia	MGQ	HCMM	Mogadishu International Airport	
Moshi	Tanzania	QSI	HTMS	Moshi Airport	
Mpanda	Tanzania	—	HTMP	Mpanda Airport	
Mtwara	Tanzania	MYW	HTMT	Mtwara Airport	
Murchison Falls	Uganda	KBG	HUKF	Kabalega Falls Airport	
Musoma	Tanzania	MUZ	HTMU	Musoma Airport	
Mwanza	Tanzania	MWZ	HTMW	Mwanza Airport	
Nairobi	Kenya	NBO	HKJK	Jomo Kenyatta International Airport ^{†}	
Nachingwea	Tanzania	NCH	HTNA	Nachingwea Airport	
Ndola	Zambia	NLA	FLND	Ndola Airport	
Njombe	Tanzania	JOM	HTNJ	Njombe Airport	
Pemba	Tanzania	PMA	HTPE	Pemba Airport	
Rome	Italy	FCO	LIRF	Leonardo da Vinci-Fiumicino Airport	
Salisbury	Zimbabwe	HRE	FVHA	Salisbury Airport	
Seronera	Tanzania	SEU	HTSN	Seronera Airstrip	
Songea	Tanzania	SGX	HTSO	Songea Airport	
Soroti	Uganda	SRT	HUSO	Soroti Airport	
Tabora	Tanzania	TBO	HTTB	Tabora Airport	
Tananarive	Madagascar	TNR	FMMI	Ivato Airport	
Tanga	Tanzania	TGT	HTTG	Tanga Airport	
Tororo	Uganda	TRY	HUTO	Tororo Airport	
Zanzibar	Tanzania	ZNZ	HTZA	Zanzibar International Airport	
Zürich	Switzerland	ZRH	LSZH	Kloten Airport	

== Fleet ==
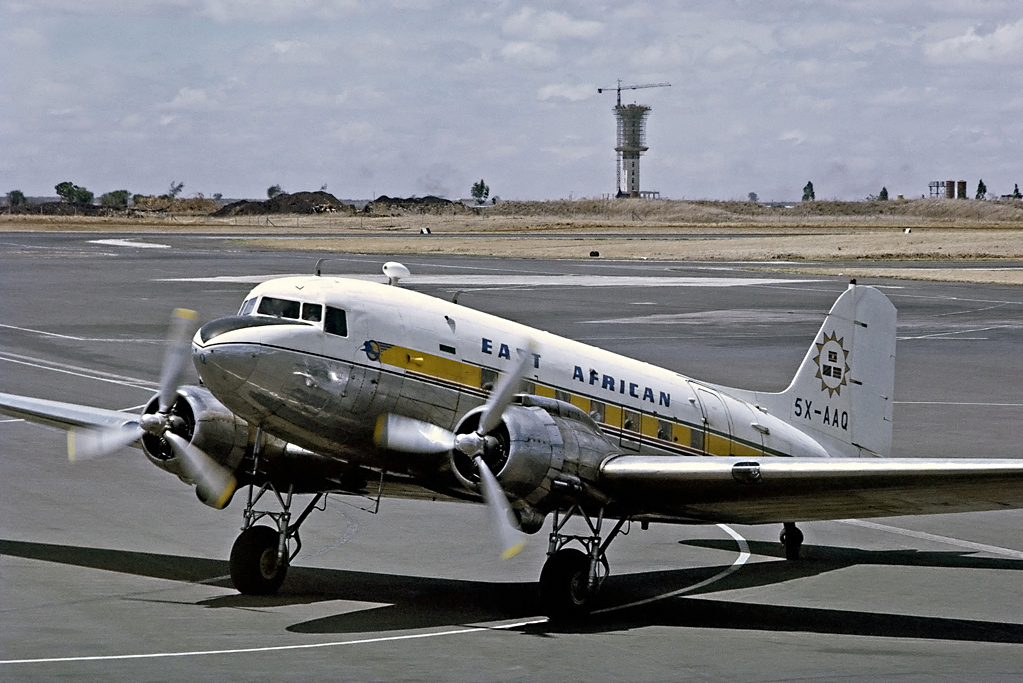
An East African Airways Douglas C-47 at Jomo Kenyatta International Airport in 1975.

The airline operated the following aircraft at some point during its history.

- Boeing 707-320
- Boeing 707-320F
- Boeing 747-100
- Bristol Britannia 300
- Canadair Argonaut
- Comet 4
- De Havilland DHC-6 Twin Otter
- Douglas DC-9-10
- Douglas DC-9-30
- Fokker F27-200
- Douglas C-47A
- Douglas C-47B
- Vickers VC10

== Accidents and incidents ==
According to the Aviation Safety Network, the airline experienced seven events during its history, two of which had fatalities. The total death toll was 63. All occurrences shown below resulted in hull-loss of the aircraft.

Date	Location	Aircraft	Tail number	Fatalities	Description	Refs
18 May 1955	Mount Kilimanjaro	Douglas C-47B	VP-KKH	20/20	Crashed on the slopes of Mount Kilimanjaro while operating a scheduled passenger service from Dar es Salaam to Nairobi as Flight 104.	
11 April 1962	Nairobi	Argonaut	VP-KNY	0/3	Struck the ground and caught fire at Embakasi Airport during a training flight.	
29 August 1963	Francistown	Douglas C-47B	VP-KJT	Unknown	Destroyed by fire at Francistown Airport.	
18 April 1972	Addis Ababa	VC-10-1154	5X-UVA	43/107	Overran the runway at Bole International Airport following an aborted takeoff and then broke up and caught fire. The aircraft was due to operate the Addis Ababa–Rome leg of an international scheduled passenger service as Flight 720. Of the 107 people on board, 43 died.	
5 July 1973	Mbeya	Douglas C-47B	5H-AAK	0	Ground-looped at Mbeya Airport during the landing roll.	
27 August 1975	Mtwara	Douglas C-47B	5Y-AAF	0/19	Skidded off the runway on landing at Mtwara Airport.	

== See also ==
- Airlines of Africa
- Central African Airways
- Transport in Kenya
- Transport in Tanzania
- Transport in Uganda
