= List of Air Tanzania destinations =

Air Tanzania operates flights from its hub at Julius Nyerere International Airport in Dar es Salaam, Tanzania; and has flights to sixteen domestic and twenty international destinations.

In 2025, the airline had a domestic market share of 50.1 per cent.

== List ==
Country	City	Airport	Notes	Refs
Botswana	Gaborone	Sir Seretse Khama International Airport	Terminated	
Burundi	Bujumbura	Melchior Ndadaye International Airport		
China	Beijing	TBA	Coming soon	
China	Guangzhou	Guangzhou Baiyun International Airport		
Comoros	Moroni	Prince Said Ibrahim International Airport		
Democratic Republic of Congo	Goma	Goma International Airport	Coming soon	
Democratic Republic of Congo	Kinshasa	N'djili Airport		
Democratic Republic of Congo	Lubumbashi	Lubumbashi International Airport		
Djibouti	Djibouti City	Djibouti–Ambouli International Airport	Terminated	
Egypt	Cairo	Cairo International Airport	Terminated	
Ethiopia	Addis Ababa	Addis Ababa Bole International Airport	Terminated	
Germany	Frankfurt	Frankfurt am Main International Airport	Terminated	
Ghana	Accra	Accra International Airport		
Greece	Athens	Athens International Airport	Terminated	
India	Mumbai	Chhatrapati Shivaji Maharaj International Airport		
Italy	Rome	Leonardo da Vinci–Fiumicino Airport	Terminated	
Ivory Coast	Abidjan	Félix-Houphouët-Boigny International Airport	Coming soon	
Kenya	Mombasa	Moi International Airport	Coming soon	
Kenya	Nairobi	Jomo Kenyatta International Airport		
Madagascar	Antananarivo	Ivato International Airport	Terminated	
Malawi	Blantyre	Chileka International Airport	Coming soon	
Malawi	Lilongwe	Kamuzu International Airport	Coming soon	
Mauritius	Port Louis	Sir Seewoosagur Ramgoolam International Airport	Terminated	
Mayotte	Dzaoudzi	Dzaoudzi–Pamandzi International Airport	Coming soon	
Mozambique	Maputo	Maputo International Airport	Coming soon	
Nigeria	Lagos	Murtala Muhammed International Airport		
Oman	Muscat	Muscat International Airport		
Russia	Moscow	Vnukovo International Airport		
Rwanda	Kigali	Kigali International Airport	Coming soon	
Saudi Arabia	Jeddah	King Abdulaziz International Airport	Terminated	
Senegal	Dakar	Blaise Diagne International Airport	Coming soon	
Seychelles	Mahé	Seychelles International Airport		
Somalia	Mogadishu	Aden Adde International Airport	Coming soon	
South Africa	Cape Town	Cape Town International Airport		
South Africa	Johannesburg	O. R. Tambo International Airport		
South Sudan	Juba	Juba International Airport	Coming soon	
Tanzania	Arusha	Arusha Airport		
Tanzania	Bukoba	Bukoba Airport		
Tanzania	Dar es Salaam	Julius Nyerere International Airport	Hub	
Tanzania	Dodoma	Dodoma Airport		
Tanzania	Dodoma	Msalato International Airport	Coming soon	
Tanzania	Chato / Geita	Geita Airport		
Tanzania	Iringa	Iringa Airport		
Tanzania	Kigoma	Kigoma Airport		
Tanzania	Kilwa	Kilwa Masoko Airport	Terminated	
Tanzania	Lindi	Lindi Airport	Terminated	
Tanzania	Mafia Island	Mafia Airport	Terminated	
Tanzania	Masasi	Masasi Airport	Terminated	
Tanzania	Mbeya	Songwe Airport		
Tanzania	Moshi	Kilimanjaro International Airport		
Tanzania	Mpanda	Mpanda Airport		
Tanzania	Mtwara	Mtwara Airport		
Tanzania	Musoma	Musoma Airport	Coming soon	
Tanzania	Mwanza	Mwanza Airport		
Tanzania	Nachingwea	Nachingwea Airport	Terminated	
Tanzania	Pemba Island	Pemba Airport		
Tanzania	Serengeti National Park	Seronera Airstrip	Coming soon	
Tanzania	Shinyanga	Shinyanga Airport	Coming soon	
Tanzania	Songea	Songea Airport		
Tanzania	Sumbawanga	Sumbawanga Airport		
Tanzania	Tabora	Tabora Airport		
Tanzania	Tanga	Tanga Airport	Terminated	
Tanzania	Zanzibar	Abeid Amani Karume International Airport		
Thailand	Bangkok	Suvarnabhumi Airport	Coming soon	
Uganda	Entebbe	Entebbe International Airport		
United Arab Emirates	Dubai	Dubai International Airport		
United Kingdom	London	Gatwick Airport	Begins 1 July 2027	
United States	Atlanta	Hartsfield–Jackson Atlanta International Airport	Coming soon	
United States	New York City	TBA	Coming soon	
Yemen	Aden	Aden International Airport	Terminated	
Zambia	Lusaka	Kenneth Kaunda International Airport		
Zambia	Ndola	Simon Mwansa Kapwepwe International Airport		
Zimbabwe	Harare	Robert Gabriel Mugabe International Airport		
Zimbabwe	Victoria Falls	Victoria Falls Airport		
