= West Kilimanjaro Airstrip =

- IATA: none; ICAO: HTWK

Summary
- Airport type: Public
- Owner: Government of Tanzania
- Operator: Tanzania Airports Authority
- Serves: Kilimanjaro National Park
- Elevation AMSL: 4,300 ft / 1,311 m
- Coordinates: 3°03′15″S 36°59′55″E
- Website: www.taa.go.tz

Map
- Location of airstrip in Tanzania HTWK (Africa)

Runways
Direction	Length		Surface
Direction	m	ft	Surface
15/33	1,235	4,052	Grass
- Sources: TCAA Google Maps

West Kilimanjaro Airstrip (ICAO: HTWK) is an airstrip in the Kilimanjaro Region of Tanzania. It is near Kilimanjaro National Park.

== Airlines and destinations ==
Airlines	Destinations
Coastal Aviation	Arusha, Dar es Salaam, Moshi, Zanzibar

== See also ==
- List of airports in Tanzania
- Transport in Tanzania
