= List of airports in Tanzania =

Summary
| Operator | Aerodromes |
|---|---|
| TAA | 60 |
| ZAA | 2 |
| KADCO | 0 |
| TANAPA | 26 |
| MNRT | 61 |
| NCAA | 2 |
| Private | 93 |

List of airports in Tanzania is a partial list of aerodromes (airports and airstrips) in Tanzania.

The ICAO airport codes for Tanzania begin with the letters "HT".

Airport names in bold have scheduled commercial airline service(s).

Runway information is for the longest runway and/or the one with better surface (when more than one is available).

== Airports ==
=== Tanzania Mainland ===
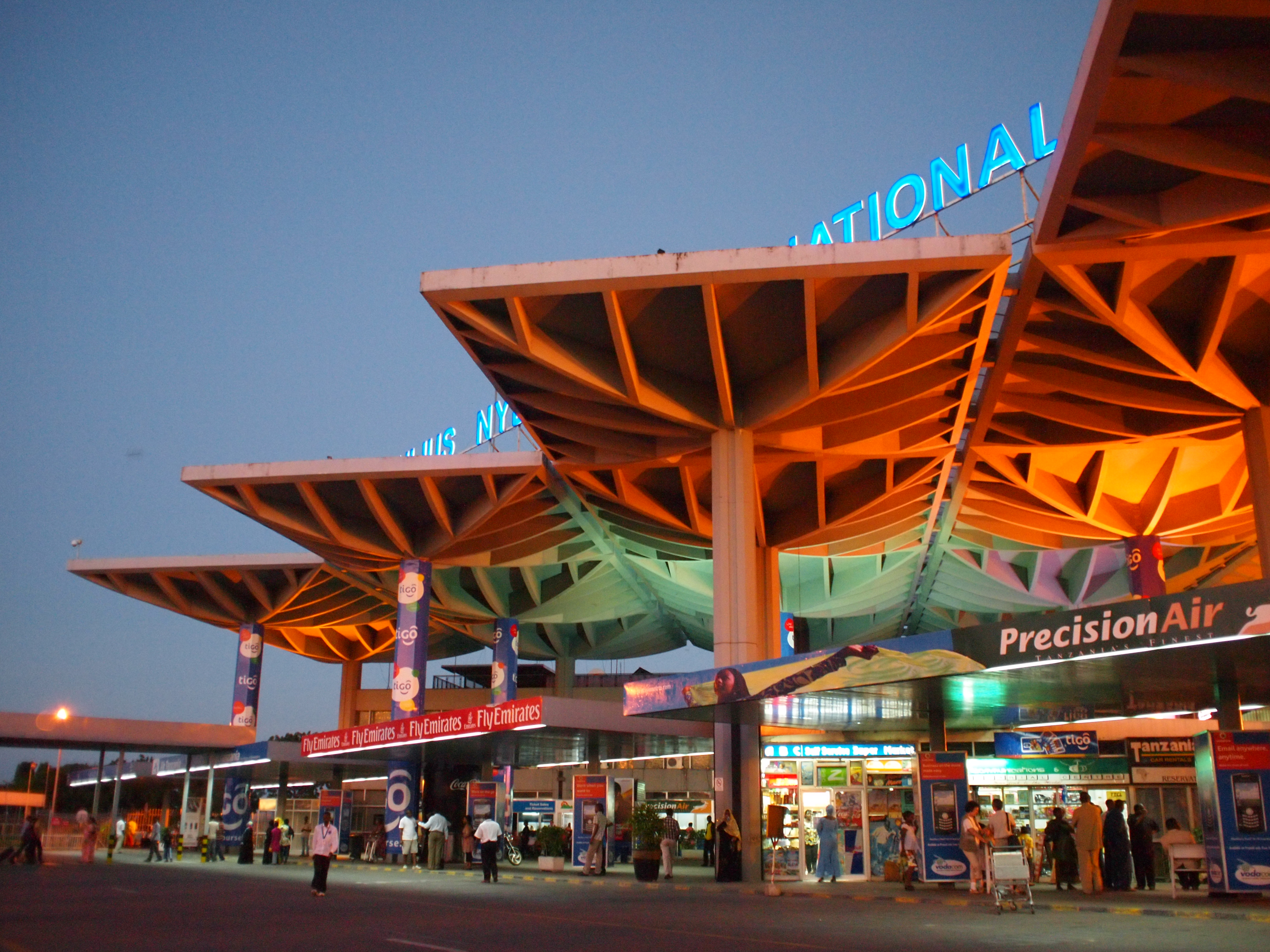
Julius Nyerere International Airport

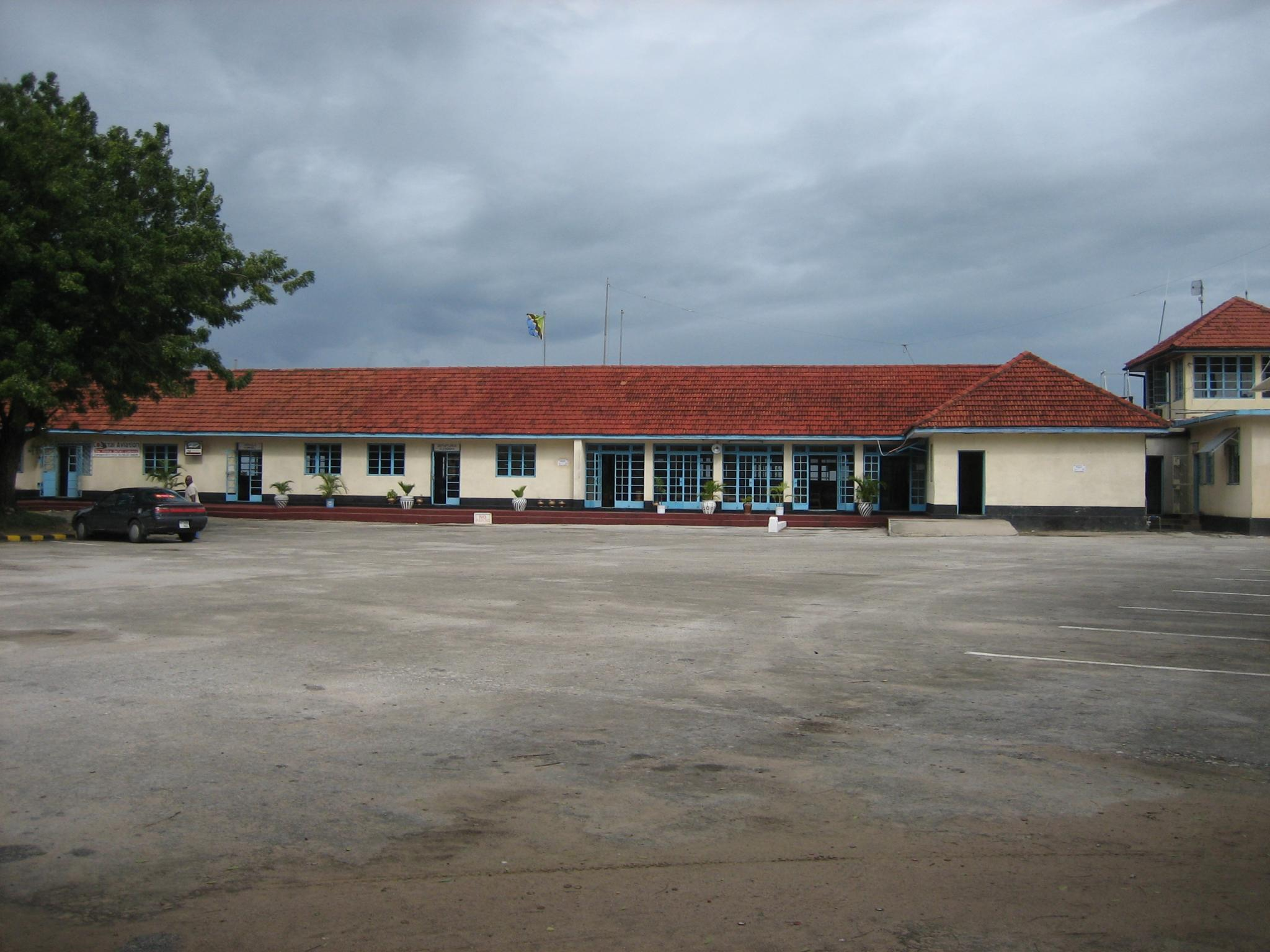
Tanga Airport

The mainland (excluding Zanzibar) has 27 airports. The Tanzania Airports Authority (TAA) operates all the airports including Kilimanjaro International since October,2024, which was previously managed by the state-owned Kilimanjaro Airport Development Company (KADCO).

| **Key** | Airport of entry |

| Location | Region | ICAO | IATA | Airport name | Runway (m) | Surface |
|---|---|---|---|---|---|---|
| Arusha | Arusha Region | HTAR | ARK | **Arusha Airport** | 1,820 | Asphalt |
| Bukoba | Kagera Region | HTBU | BKZ | **Bukoba Airport** | 1,325 | Asphalt |
| Dar es Salaam | Dar es Salaam Region | HTDA | DAR | **Julius Nyerere International Airport** | 3,000 | Asphalt |
| Dodoma | Dodoma Region | HTDO | DOD | **Dodoma Airport** | 2,500 | Asphalt |
| Chato District | Geita Region | HTGE | GIT | **Geita Airport** | 3,000 | Asphalt |
| Hai District | Kilimanjaro Region | HTKJ | JRO | **Kilimanjaro International Airport** | 3,600 | Asphalt |
| Ibadakuli | Shinyanga Region | HTSY | SHY | Shinyanga Airport | 2,000 | |
| Kilwa Masoko | Lindi Region | HTKI | KIY | **Kilwa Masoko Airport** | 1,800 | |
| Lake Manyara | Arusha Region | HTLM | LKY | **Lake Manyara Airport** | 1,220 | |
| Lindi | Lindi Region | HTLI | LDI | Lindi Airport | 1,748 | |
| Mafia Island | Pwani Region | HTMA | MFA | **Mafia Airport** | 1,500 | Asphalt |
| Masasi | Mtwara Region | HTMI | XMI | Masasi Airport | 1,275 | |
| Mbeya | Mbeya Region | HTMB | MBI | **Mbeya Airport** | 1,569 | |
| Mbeya | Mbeya Region | HTGW | | **Songwe Airport** | 3,330 | Asphalt |
| Moshi | Kilimanjaro Region | HTMS | QSI | **Moshi Airport** | 1,569 | |
| Mpanda | Katavi Region | HTMP | NPY | **Mpanda Airport** | 1,820 | Asphalt |
| Mtwara | Mtwara Region | HTMT | MYW | **Mtwara Airport** | 2,260 | Asphalt |
| Musoma | Mara Region | HTMU | MUZ | **Musoma Airport** | 1,600 | |
| Mwadui | Shinyanga Region | HTMD | MWN | Mwadui Airport | 1400 | Gravel |
| Mwanza | Mwanza Region | HTMW | MWZ | **Mwanza Airport** | 3,010 | Asphalt |
| Nachingwea | Lindi Region | HTNA | NCH | Nachingwea Airport | 1,795 | |
| Nduli | Iringa Region | HTIR | IRI | **Iringa Airport** | 2,100 | Asphalt |
| Ngara | Kagera Region | HTNR | | Ngara Airport | 1,445 | |
| Njombe | Njombe Region | HTNJ | JOM | Njombe Airport | 1,890 | Grass |
| Songea | Ruvuma Region | HTSO | SGX | **Songea Airport** | 1,617 | Asphalt |
| Sumbawanga | Rukwa Region | HTSU | SUT | Sumbawanga Airport | 1,428 | |
| Tabora | Tabora Region | HTTB | TBO | **Tabora Airport** | 1,900 | Asphalt |
| Tanga | Tanga Region | HTTG | TGT | **Tanga Airport** | 1,255 | Asphalt |
| Ujiji | Kigoma Region | HTKA | TKQ | **Kigoma Airport** | 1,794 | Asphalt |

=== Zanzibar ===
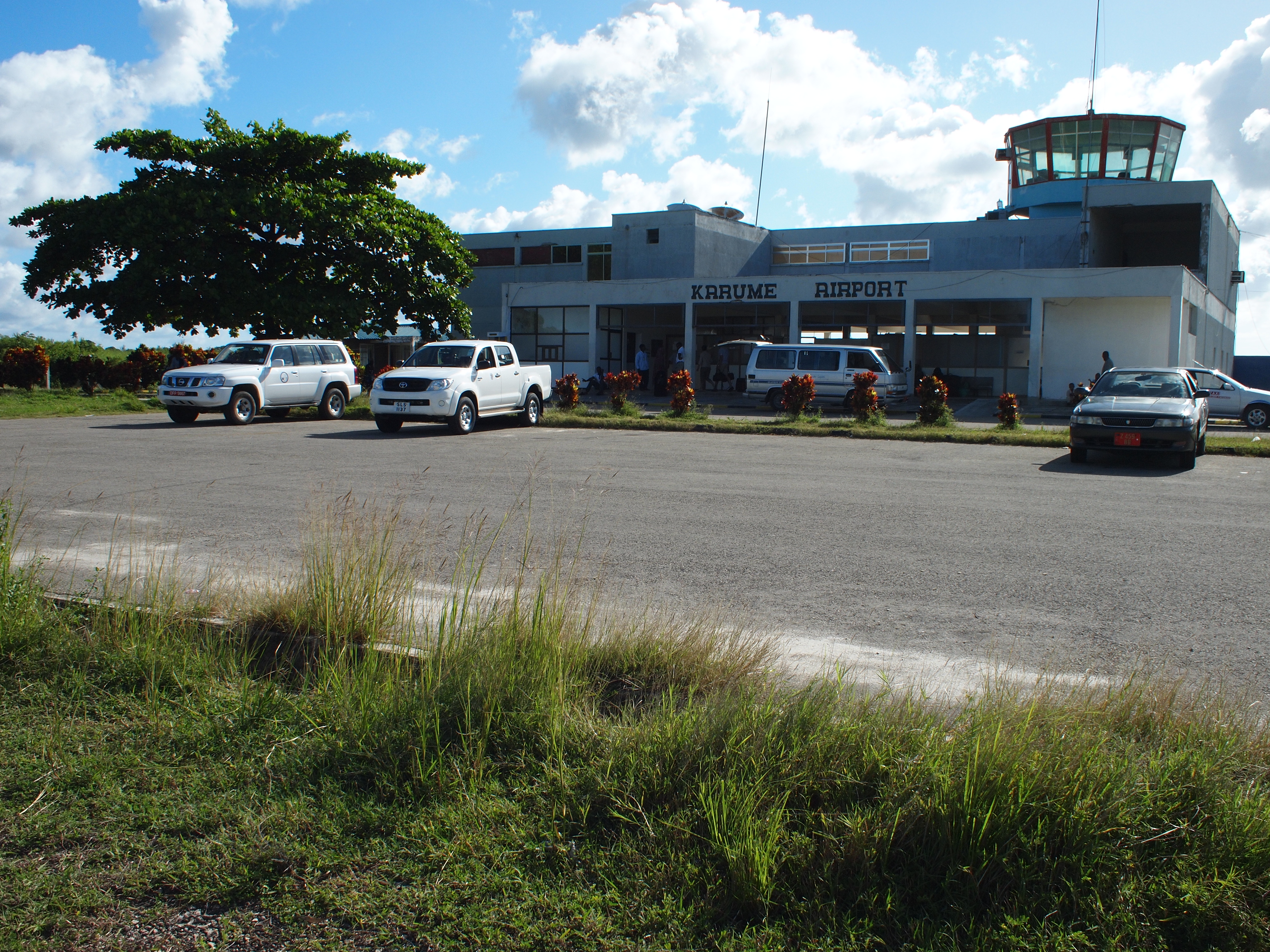
Pemba Airport

Airports in the Zanzibar Archipelago are under the jurisdiction of the Zanzibar Airports Authority.

| Location | Region | ICAO | IATA | Airport name | Runway (m) |
|---|---|---|---|---|---|
| Pemba Island | South Pemba Region | HTPE | PMA | **Pemba Airport** | 1,517 |
| Unguja Island | Zanzibar Central/South Region | HTZA | ZNZ | **Abeid Amani Karume International Airport** | 3,007 |

== Airstrips ==
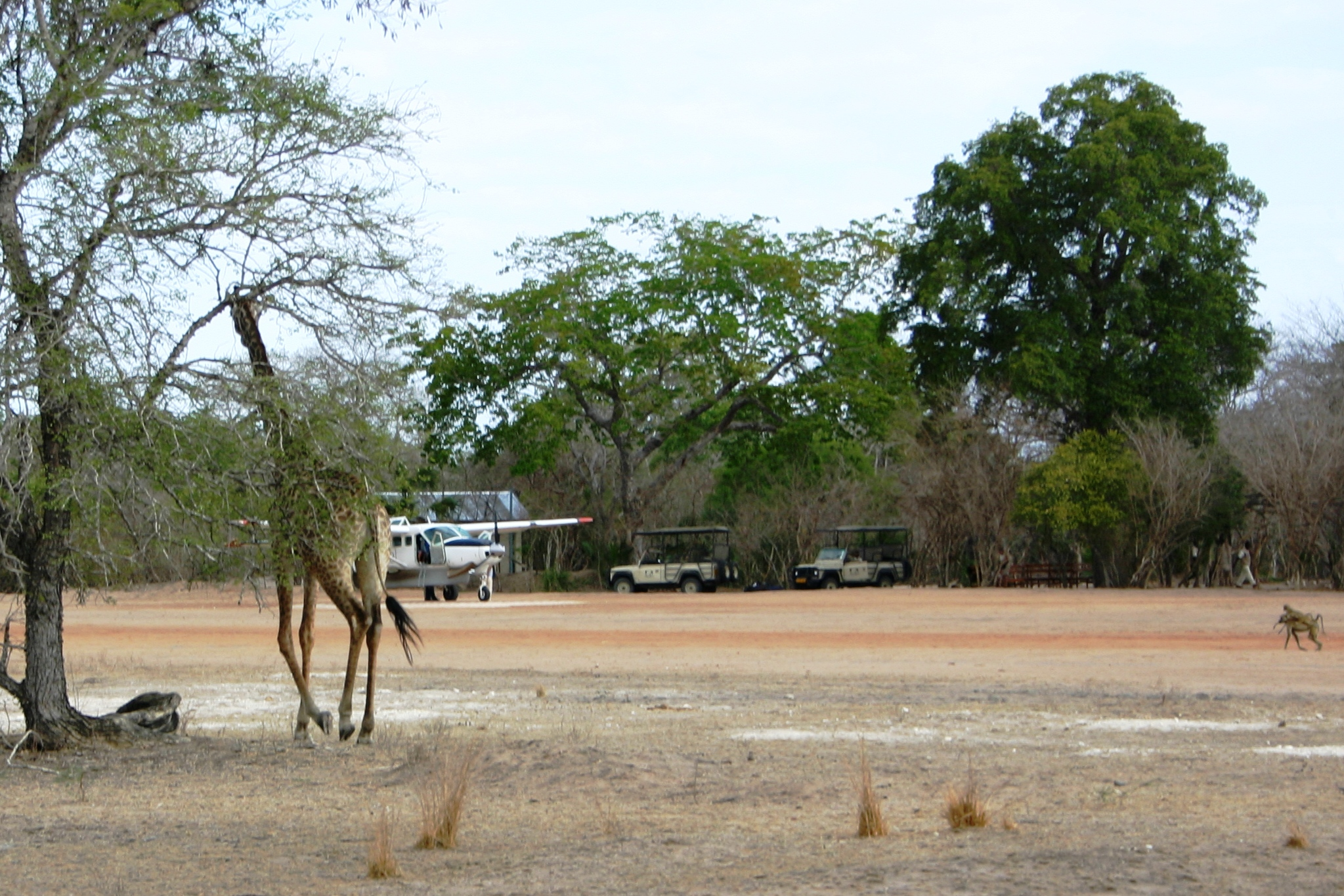
A giraffe passing by the Mtemere Airstrip in the Selous Game Reserve

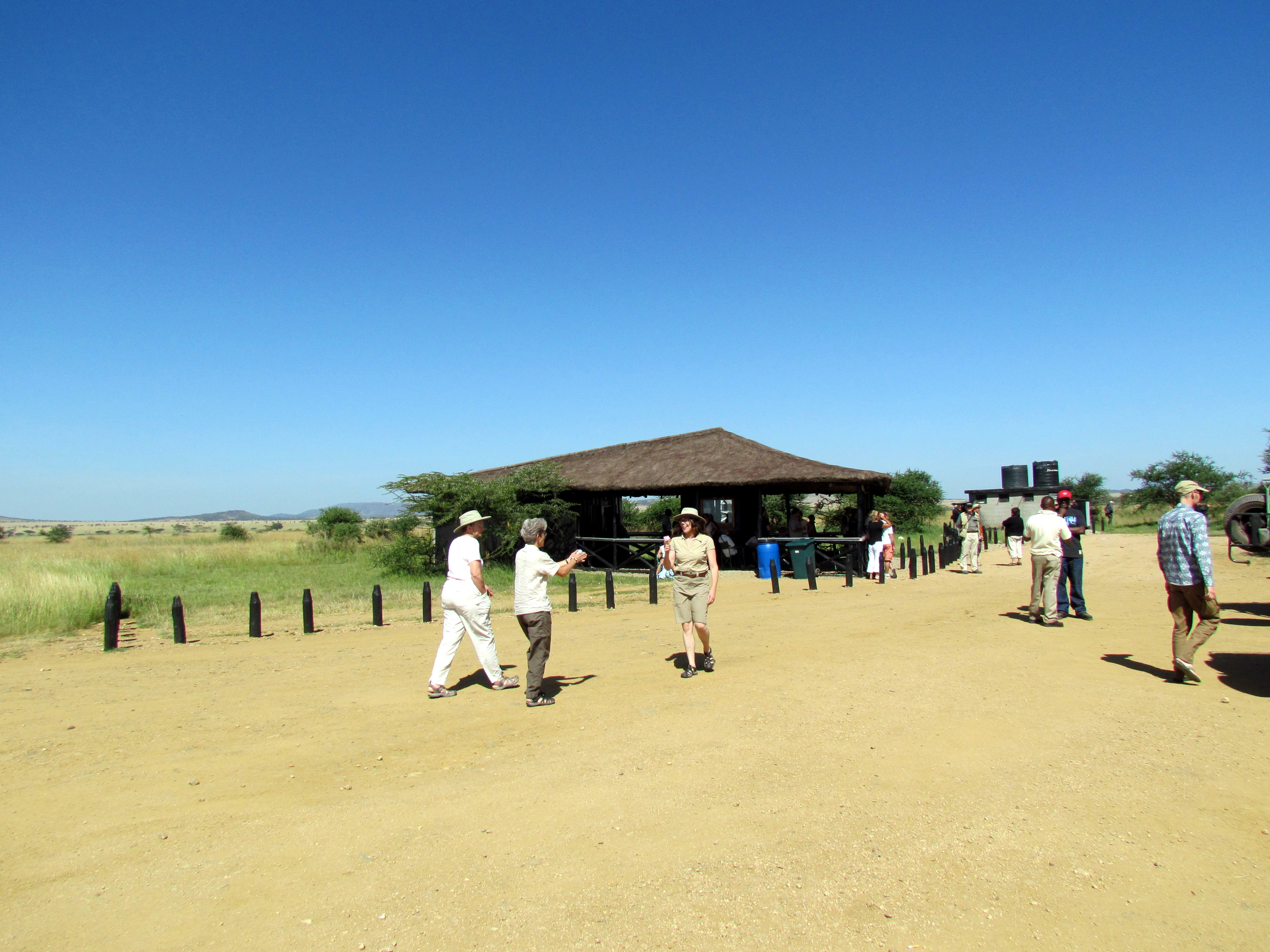
Tourists arriving at Seronera

| Location | Region | ICAO | IATA | Airstrip name | Runway (m) | Operated by |
|---|---|---|---|---|---|---|
| Loliondo | Arusha Region | HTLD | | Loliondo Airstrip | 1,535 | TAA |
| Mikumi National Park | Morogoro Region | HTMK | | Kikoboga Airstrip | 1,330 | TANAPA |
| Mombo | Tanga Region | HTMO | | Mombo Airstrip | 1,285 | TAA |
| Morogoro | Morogoro Region | HTMG | | **Morogoro Airstrip** | 1,000 | TAA |
| Kilimanjaro National Park | Kilimanjaro Region | HTWK | | **West Kilimanjaro Airstrip** | 1,244 | TAA |
| Ruaha National Park | Iringa Region | HTMR | | Msembe Airstrip | 1,288 | TANAPA |
| Rubondo Island National Park | Mwanza Region | | | **Rubondo Airstrip** | 1,242 | TANAPA |
| Same | Kilimanjaro Region | HTSE | | Same Airstrip | 750 | TAA |
| Selous Game Reserve | Pwani Region | | | **Mtemere Airstrip** | 1,232 | MNRT |
| Seronera | Mara Region | HTSN | SEU | **Seronera Airstrip** | 1,570 | TANAPA |
| Singida | Singida Region | HTSD | | Singida Airstrip | 1,057 | TAA |
| Songo Songo Island | Lindi Region | | | Songo Songo Airstrip | 1,050 | TPDC |

* TAA Tanzania Airports Authority, TANAPA Tanzania National Parks Authority, TPDC Tanzania Petroleum Development Corporation, MNRT Ministry of Natural Resources and Tourism

== Military airbases ==
- Mwanza Air Force Base, Mwanza
- Ngerengere Air Force Base, Morogoro Region
- Ukonga Air Force Base, Dar es Salaam

== Proposed airports ==
- Msalato International Airport, Dodoma (capital)
- Kajunguti International Airport, Kagera Region
- Serengeti International Airport, Mugumu

== See also ==
- Transport in Tanzania
- List of airports by ICAO code: H#HT - Tanzania
- Wikipedia: WikiProject Aviation/Airline destination lists: Africa#Tanzania, United Republic of
