= Salahuddin Junejo =

Member of the National Assembly of Pakistan from Sanghar (2024–2029)

- صلاح الدين جوڻيجو

Member of the National Assembly of Pakistan
- Incumbent
- Assumed office 29 February 2024
- Constituency: NA-210 Sanghar-II

Personal details
- Party: PPP (2024-present)
- Parent: Roshan Din Junejo (father)

Salahuddin Junejo (Sindhi: صلاح الدين جوڻيجو;Urdu: صلاحُ الدین جونیجو) is a Pakistani politician who has been a member of the National Assembly of Pakistan since February 2024.

== Political career ==
Junejo was elected to the National Assembly of Pakistan in the 2024 Pakistani general election from NA-210 Sanghar-II as a candidate of Pakistan People's Party (PPP). He received 150,196 votes while runner-up Saira Bano, a candidate of the Grand Democratic Alliance (GDA), received 108,194 votes.

The PPP alleged that Junejo was attacked at a polling station during the 2026 Azad Kashmiri general election, with PPP chairman Bilawal Bhutto Zardari calling the incident "alarming".
