= Flight 104 (disambiguation) =

"Flight 104" is an episode of Captain Scarlet and the Mysterons

Flight 104 may also refer to:

- East African Airways Flight 104, crashed on 18 May 1955
- Northwest Airlines Flight 104, crashed on 28 October 1960
- Trans Mediterranean Airways Flight 104, crashed on 9 July 1962
- Far Eastern Air Transport Flight 104, crashed on 24 February 1969
- Sun West Airlines Flight 104, crashed on 31 December 1981
