= Same Airstrip =

Same Airstrip Uwanja mdogo wa Ndege wa Same
- IATA: none; ICAO: HTSE; WMO: 63816

Summary
- Airport type: Public
- Owner: Government of Tanzania
- Operator: Tanzania Airports Authority
- Serves: Same, Tanzania
- Elevation AMSL: 3,000 ft / 914 m
- Coordinates: 4°03′13″S 37°47′25″E
- Website: www.taa.go.tz

Map
- Location of airstrip in Tanzania

Runways
Direction	Length		Surface
Direction	m	ft	Surface
08/26	760	2,493	Grass
- Sources: Google Maps GCM TCAA

Same Airstrip (ICAO: HTSE) is an airstrip serving the town of Same in the Kilimanjaro Region of Tanzania.

The runway is 5 kilometres (3.1 mi) northeast of the town, near the Mkomazi National Park. There is rising and mountainous terrain in all quadrants except east.

The Kilimanjaro VOR-DME (Ident: KV) is located 55 nautical miles (101.9 km) northwest of the airstrip.

== See also ==
- List of airports in Tanzania
- Transport in Tanzania
