= Imamuddin Shouqeen =

Pakistani politician

Senator Imamuddin Shouqeen
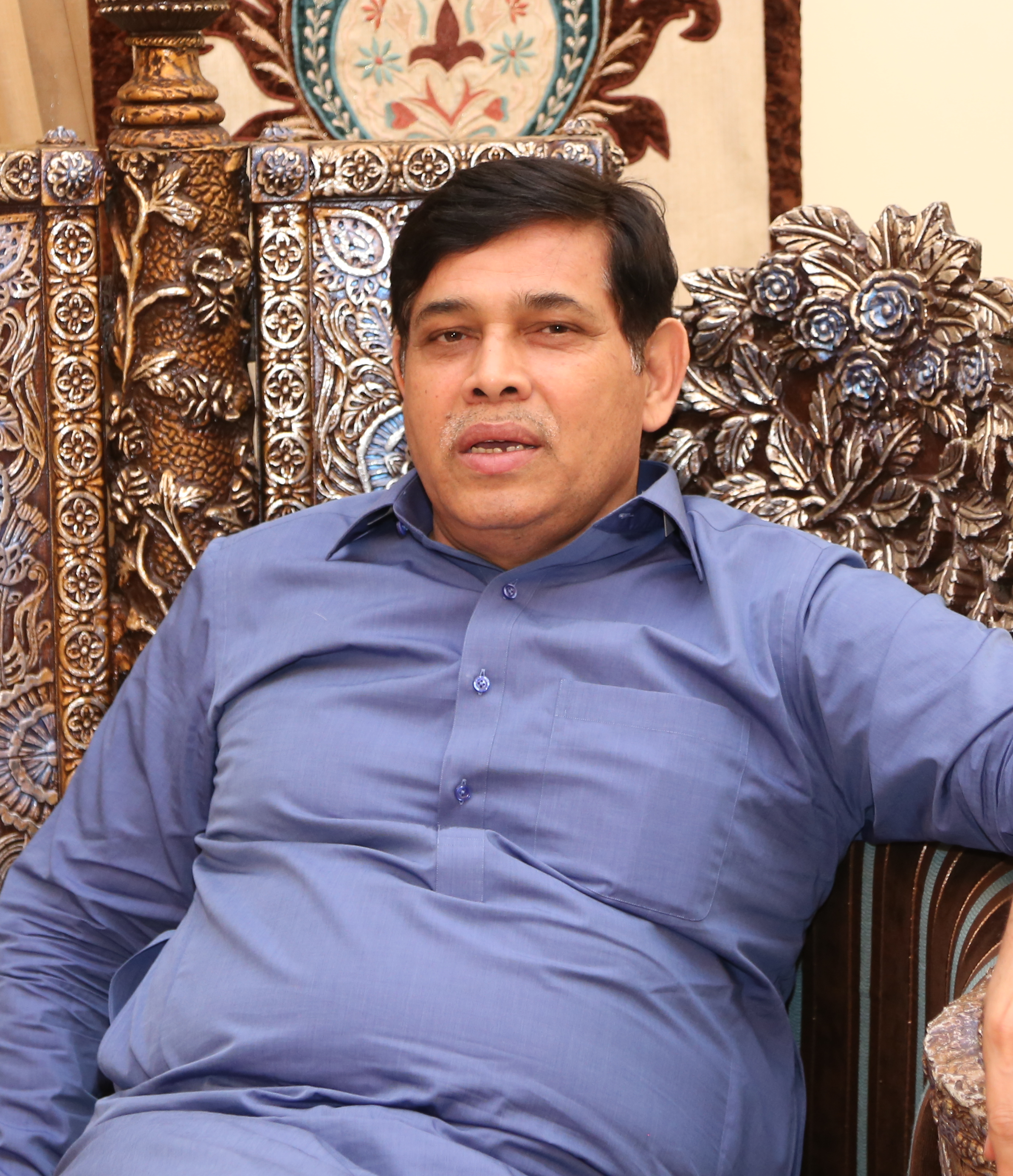

Member of the Senate of Pakistan
- Incumbent
- Assumed office 12 March 2018

Member of the Provincial Assembly of Sindh
- In office 2002–2007
- Constituency: PS-82 (Sanghar-V)

Personal details
- Party: Pakistan Peoples Party

Malik Imamuddin Shouqeen is a Pakistani politician who has been a Member of the Senate of Pakistan, since March 2018. Previously he had been a member of the Provincial Assembly of Sindh from 2002 to 2007.Outside of his political career, he serves as the chairman of the popular group of industries

== Education ==
Shouqeen has the degree of Bachelor of Arts and Bachelor of Laws.

== Political career ==
Shouqeen was elected to the Provincial Assembly of Sindh as a candidate of Pakistan Muslim League (F) (PML-F) from Constituency PS-82 (Sanghar-V) in the 2002 Pakistani general election. He received 28,889 votes and defeated a candidate of Pakistan Peoples Party (PPP).

In December 2008, Shouqeen was inducted into provincial cabinet of Sindh and was made advisor to the Chief Minister of Sindh with the status of a provincial minister. In April 2009, his portfolio was changed from advisor to the Chief Minister for Anti-corruption and Inquiries to advisor for Mines and Mineral Development.

He ran for the seat of the National Assembly of Pakistan as a candidate of PML-F from Constituency NA-236 (Sanghar-III) in the 2013 Pakistani general election, but was unsuccessful and lost the seat to Roshan Din Junejo.

Shouqeen was elected to the Senate of Pakistan as a candidate of PPP on general seat from Sindh in the 2018 Pakistani Senate election. He took oath as Senator on 12 March 2018.
