= Ngara Airport =

Ngara Airport Uwanja wa Ndege wa Ngara (Swahili)
- IATA: none; ICAO: HTNR

Summary
- Airport type: Public
- Owner: Government of Tanzania
- Operator: Tanzania Airports Authority
- Location: Ngara, Tanzania
- Elevation AMSL: 5,500 ft / 1,676 m
- Coordinates: 2°32′30″S 30°42′10″E
- Website: www.taa.go.tz

Map
- Location of airport in Tanzania

Runways
Direction	Length		Surface
Direction	m	ft	Surface
06/24	1,445	4,741	Gravel
- Sources: TCAA GCM Google Maps

Ngara Airport (ICAO: HTNR) is an airport in northwestern Tanzania serving the town of Ngara.

The runway is 6 kilometres (3.7 mi) southeast of the town. Including overruns, the runway has 1,645 metres (5,397 ft) available for takeoff.

The Rusumo non-directional beacon (Ident: CR) is located 16.4 nautical miles (30.4 km) north of the airport.

== See also ==
- List of airports in Tanzania
- Transport in Tanzania
