= Singida Airstrip =

Singida Airstrip Uwanja mdogo wa Ndege wa Singida
- IATA: none; ICAO: HTSD; WMO: 63810

Summary
- Airport type: Public
- Owner: Government of Tanzania
- Operator: Tanzania Airports Authority
- Serves: Singida
- Elevation AMSL: 5,000 ft / 1,524 m
- Coordinates: 4°48′40″S 34°43′30″E
- Website: www.taa.go.tz

Map
- Location of airstrip in Tanzania HTSD (Africa)

Runways
| Direction | Length | | Surface |
| Direction | m | ft | Surface |
|---|---|---|---|
| 09/27 | 1,057 | 3,468 | Gravel |

Statistics (2009)
- Passengers: 319
- Sources: Google Maps TCAA GCM

Singida Airstrip (ICAO: HTSD) is an airstrip in central Tanzania serving the municipality of Singida. It is 3 kilometres (1.9 mi) west of the town.

== See also ==
- List of airports in Tanzania
- Transport in Tanzania
