= Kilwa Masoko Airport =

Airport in Lindi Region, Tanzania

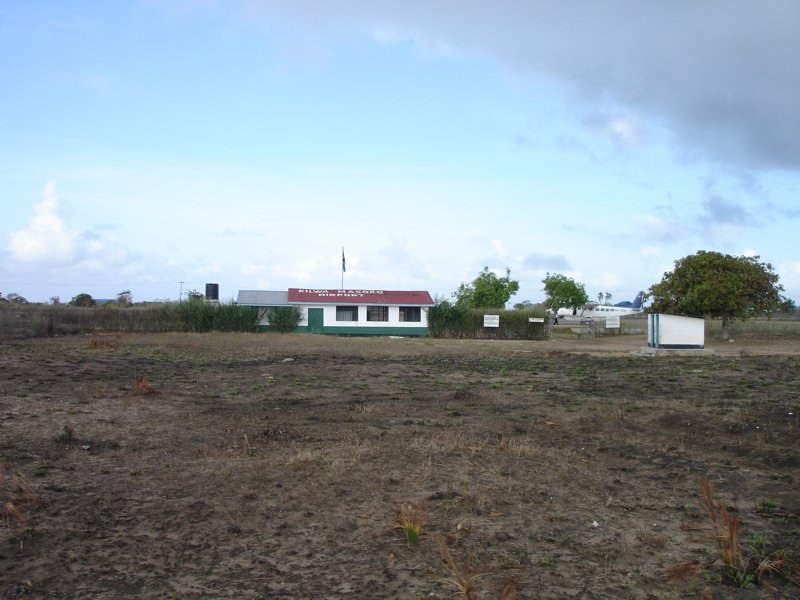
- IATA: KIY; ICAO: HTKI

Summary
- Airport type: Public
- Owner: Government of Tanzania
- Operator: Tanzania Airports Authority
- Location: Kilwa Masoko, Lindi Region, Tanzania
- Elevation AMSL: 59 ft (18 m)
- Coordinates: 8°54′40″S 39°30′30″E
- Website: www.taa.go.tz

Map
- Location of airport in Tanzania

Runways
Direction	Length		Surface
Direction	m	ft	Surface
17/35	1,800	5,906	Grass
- Sources: TCAA GCM Google Maps

Kilwa Masoko Airport (IATA: KIY, ICAO: HTKI) is an airport serving the town of Kilwa Masoko in the Lindi Region of Tanzania. Its one of three airports in Lindi Region and the one that serves northern Lindi.

== Airlines and destinations ==
Airlines	Destinations
Coastal Aviation	Dar es Salaam, Mafia Island, Pemba, Selous, Tanga, Zanzibar

== See also ==
- List of airports in Tanzania
- Transport in Tanzania
