= Kimweri =

Kimweri may refer to:

- Omari Kimweri (born 22 September 1982), an Australian boxer, born in Tanzania
- Kimweri ye Nyumbai (died 1862), the ruler of the Shambaa people of the Usambara Mountains in what is now Tanzania between around 1815 and 1862
- Kimweri Mputa Magogo (died 1999), a traditional leader of the Shambaa people of the Usambara Mountains in Tanzania
