= Mombo Airstrip =

Mombo Airstrip Uwanja mdogo wa Ndege wa Mombo
- IATA: none; ICAO: HTMO; WMO: 63818

Summary
- Airport type: Public
- Owner: Government of Tanzania
- Operator: Tanzania Airports Authority
- Location: Mombo, Tanzania
- Elevation AMSL: 1,350 ft / 411 m
- Coordinates: 4°53′55″S 38°14′30″E
- Website: www.taa.go.tz

Map
- Location of airstrip in Tanzania HTMO (Africa)

Runways
Direction	Length		Surface
Direction	m	ft	Surface
17/35	1,285	4,216	Grass
- Sources: GCM Google Maps TCAA

Mombo Airstrip (ICAO: HTMO) is an airstrip in northeastern Tanzania in the Korogwe District of the Tanga Region of Tanzania. It is 5 kilometres (3.1 mi) west of the town, and near the Usambara Mountains.

== See also ==
- List of airports in Tanzania
- Transport in Tanzania
