= MWN =

MWN can refer to:

- Morocco World News, an English language e-newspaper with its headquarters in Rabat and Washington, D.C
- Munich Scientific Network (Münchner Wissenschaftsnetz) at the Leibniz-Rechenzentrum
- mwn, the ISO 639-3 code for the Mwanga language
- Mwadui Airport, serving the Williamson diamond mine, in the Shinyanga Region of Tanzania (IATA code: MWN)
- Multi-Walled Nanotubes
