= Moshi Airport =

Moshi Airport Uwanja wa Ndege wa Moshi (Swahili)
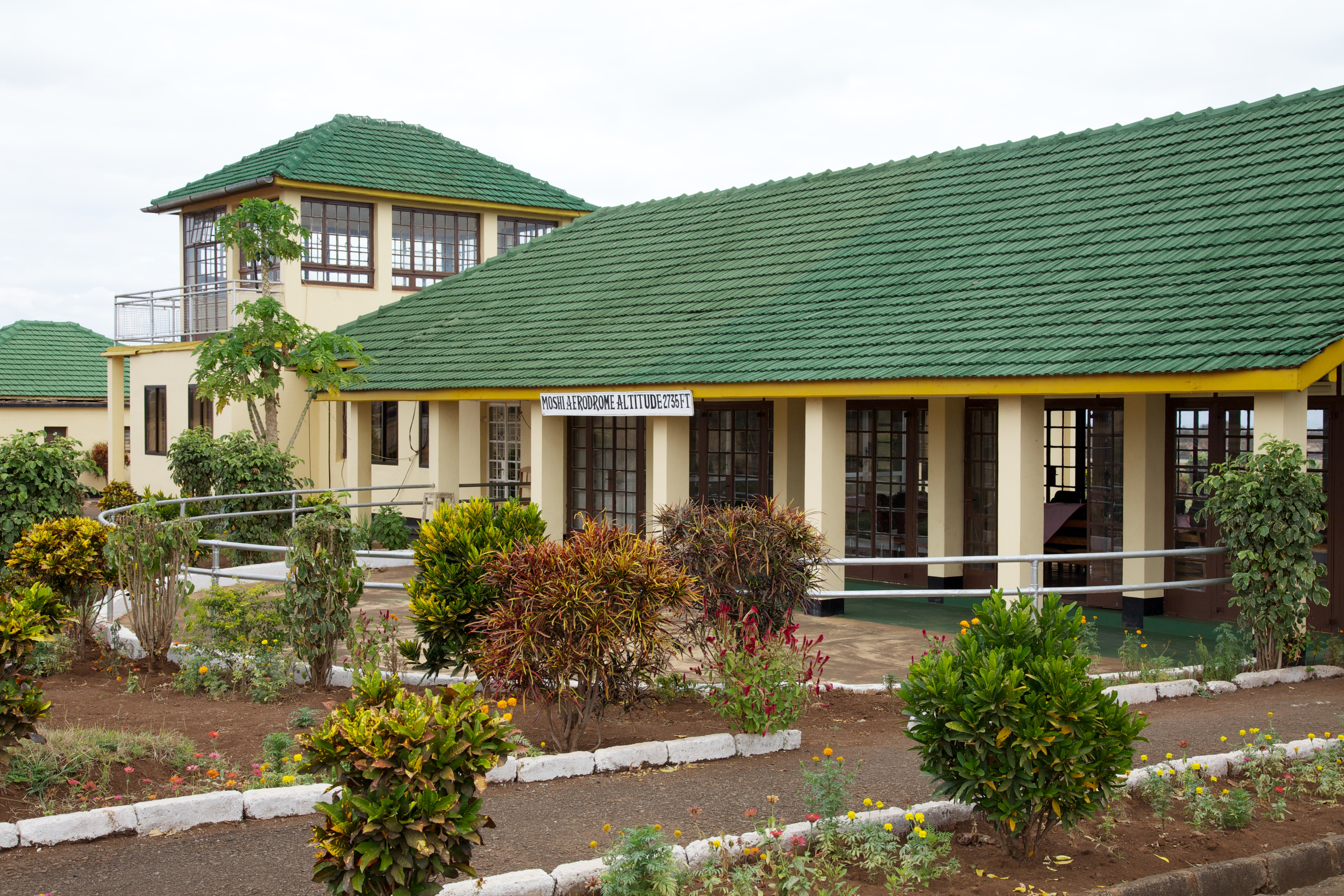
- Moshi Airport terminal building
- IATA: none; ICAO: HTMS; WMO: 63790

Summary
- Airport type: Public
- Owner: Government of Tanzania
- Operator: Tanzania Airports Authority
- Location: Moshi, Tanzania
- Elevation AMSL: 2,735 ft (834 m)
- Coordinates: 3°21′45″S 37°19′35″E
- Website: www.taa.go.tz

Map
- Location of airport in Tanzania

Runways
Direction	Length		Surface
Direction	m	ft	Surface
08/26	1,272	4,173	Gravel
17/35	1,482	4,862	Gravel

Statistics
- Passengers: 575
- Sources: Tanzania Civil Aviation Authority, Great Circle Mapper, Google Maps

Moshi Airport (IATA: QSI, ICAO: HTMS) is an airport in the Kilimanjaro Region of north-eastern Tanzania, serving the municipality of Moshi.

The airport is 13.8 nautical miles (25.6 km; 15.9 mi) east-northeast of the Kilimanjaro VOR/DME (Ident: KV).

== Airlines and destinations ==
Airlines	Destinations
Coastal Aviation	Dar es Salaam

== See also ==
- List of airports in Tanzania
- Transport in Tanzania
