= Shinyanga Airport =

Airport in Shinyanga Region, Tanzania

Shinyanga Airport Ibadakuli Airport
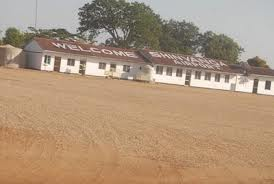
- Shinyanga Airport
- IATA: SHY; ICAO: HTSY; WMO: 63784

Summary
- Airport type: Public
- Operator: Tanzania Airports Authority
- Serves: Shinyanga, Tanzania
- Location: Ibadakuli
- Elevation AMSL: 3,800 ft / 1,158 m
- Coordinates: 3°36′35″S 33°30′15″E
- Website: www.taa.go.tz

Map
- Location of Shinyanga Airport

Runways
Direction	Length		Surface
Direction	m	ft	Surface
11/29	2,068	6,785	Gravel

Statistics
- Passengers: 12,437
- Sources: TCAA, GCM, Google Maps

Shinyanga Airport (IATA: SHY, ICAO: HTSY) is an airport serving the small city of Shinyanga, the capital of the Shinyanga Region of Tanzania. It is 10 kilometres (6.2 mi) northeast of the municipality, off the B6 road. It is also known as Ibadakuli Airport.

The Mwadui non-directional beacon (Ident: WM) is located 9.2 nautical miles (17.0 km) northeast of the airport.

The airport has been undergoing upgrades whereby a new terminal building is being constructed, and the runway, taxiways and apron have been paved with asphalt. Construction will also include infrastructure that will make the airport accessible 24 hours a day. When completed, the airport will be able to handle airplanes up to the size of a Bombardier Q400-8.

== See also ==
- List of airports in Tanzania
- Transport in Tanzania
