= Kikoboga Airstrip =

Kikoboga Airstrip Mikumi Airstrip
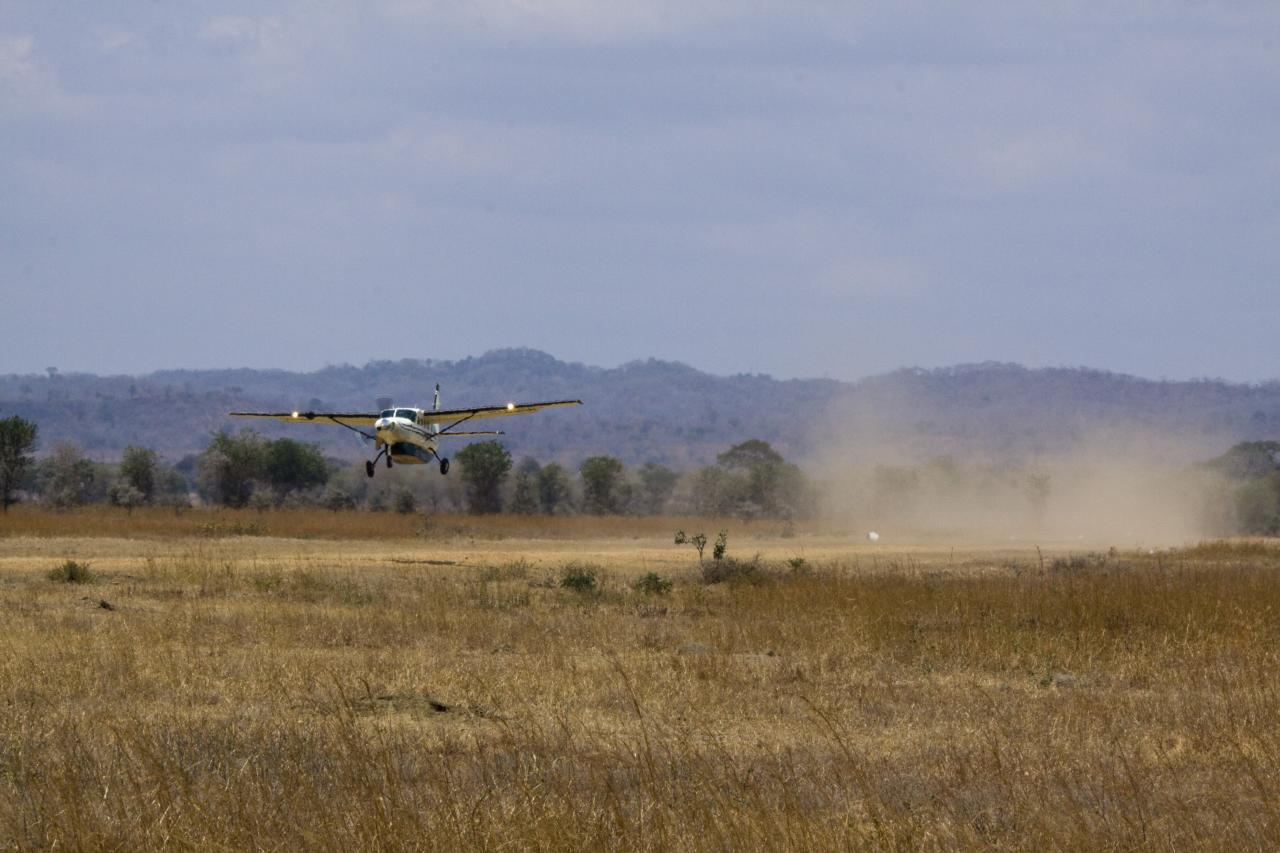
- IATA: none; ICAO: HTMK

Summary
- Airport type: Public
- Owner: Government of Tanzania
- Operator: Tanzania National Parks Authority
- Location: Mikumi National Park
- Elevation AMSL: 1,737 ft / 529 m
- Coordinates: 7°19′50″S 37°06′50″E
- Website: www.tanapa.go.tz

Map
- Location of airstrip in Tanzania HTMK (Africa)

Runways
Direction	Length		Surface
Direction	m	ft	Surface
13/31	1,330	4,364	Gravel
- Sources: Google Maps TCAA

Kikoboga Airstrip (ICAO: HTMK) is an airstrip serving the Mikumi National Park in the Morogoro Region of Tanzania.

== See also ==
- List of airports in Tanzania
- Transport in Tanzania
