= Lindi Airport =

Airport in Lindi Region, Tanzania

Lindi Airport Uwanja wa Ndege wa Lindi (Swahili)
- IATA: LDI; ICAO: HTLI

Summary
- Airport type: Public
- Owner: Government of Tanzania
- Operator: Tanzania Airports Authority
- Serves: Lindi
- Location: Lindi Region, Tanzania
- Elevation AMSL: 100 ft / 30 m
- Coordinates: 09°51′01″S 39°45′41″E
- Website: www.taa.go.tz

Map
- Location of airport in Tanzania

Runways
Direction	Length		Surface
Direction	m	ft	Surface
16/34	1,748	5,735	Grass
03/21	1,613	5,292	Grass
10/28	1,364	4,475	Grass

Lindi Airport (IATA: LDI, ICAO: HTLI) is an airport serving Lindi, the capital of the Lindi Region of Tanzania. It is also known as Kikwetu Airport.

== Location ==
The airport is located approximately 20 kilometres (12 mi), northeast of the town of Lindi. This is about 400 kilometres (249 mi), by road and about 337 kilometres (209 mi), by air, south-east of Julius Nyerere International Airport, the largest airport in Tanzania. The coordinates of Lindi Airport (Kikwetu Airport) are: 09°51'01.0"S, 39°45'41.0"E (Latitude:-9.850282; Longitude:39.761381).

== Overview ==
Lindi Airport is owned by the Government of Tanzania and is administered by the Tanzania Civil Aviation Authority. In September 2016, the government of Tanzania announced plans to expand and upgrade the airport at an estimated cost of US$125 million. The government is actively seeking funding for this purpose.

== See also ==
- List of airports in Tanzania
- Transport in Tanzania
