= Masasi Airport =

Masasi Airport Uwanja wa Ndege wa Masasi (Swahili)
- IATA: XMI; ICAO: HTMI

Summary
- Airport type: Public
- Owner: Government of Tanzania
- Operator: Tanzania Airports Authority
- Location: Masasi, Tanzania
- Elevation AMSL: 1,700 ft / 518 m
- Coordinates: 10°44′20″S 38°46′20″E
- Website: www.taa.go.tz

Map
- Location of airport in Tanzania

Runways
Direction	Length		Surface
Direction	m	ft	Surface
14/32	1,275	4,183	Grass
- Sources: TCAA GCM Google Maps

Masasi Airport (IATA: XMI, ICAO: HTMI) is an airport serving the town of Masasi in the Mtwara Region of Tanzania. It is 3 kilometres (1.9 mi) west of Masasi town.

== See also ==
- List of airports in Tanzania
- Transport in Tanzania
