= Mafia Airport =

Airport in Pwani Region, Tanzania

Mafia Airport Uwanja wa Ndege wa Mafia (Swahili)
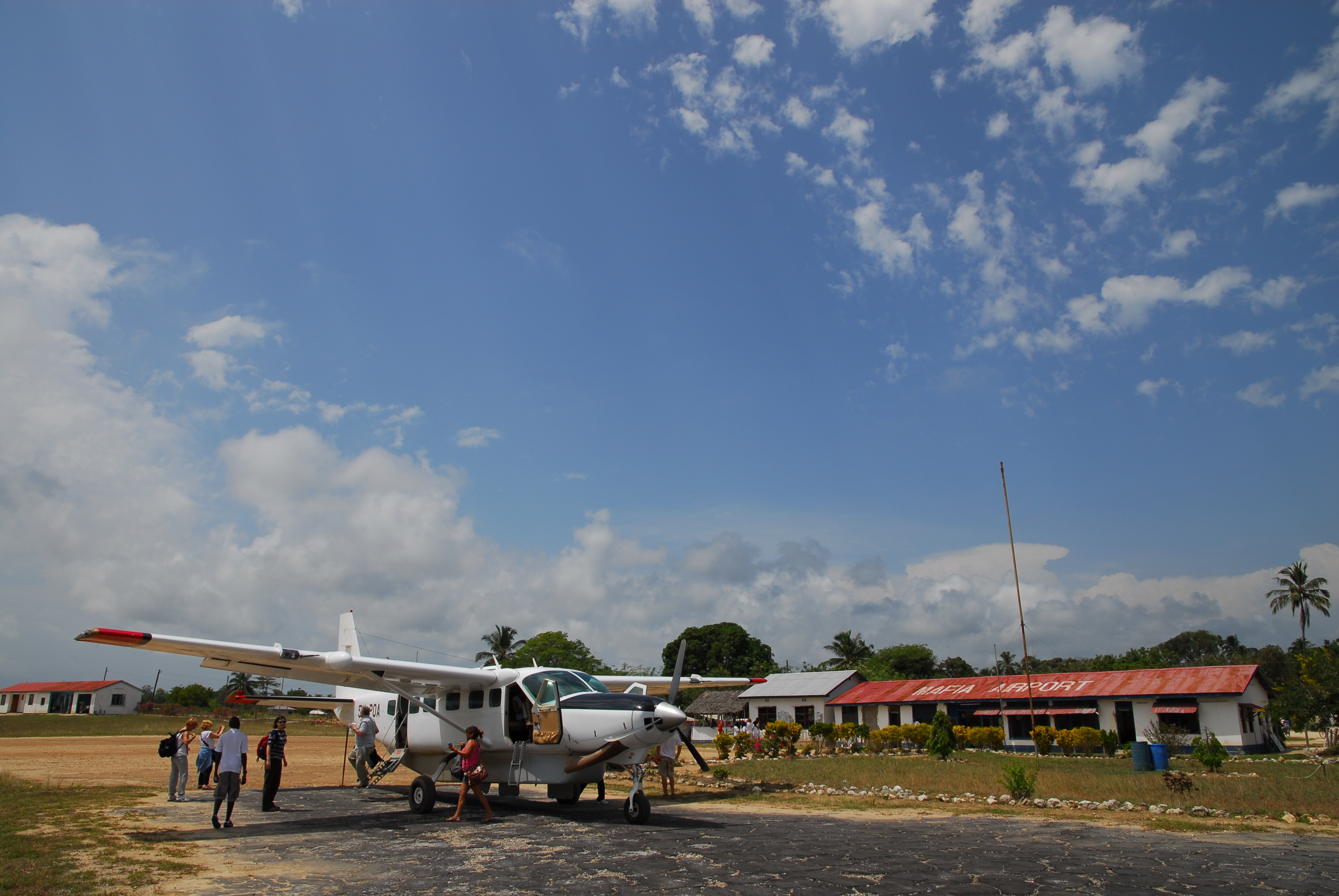
- IATA: MFA; ICAO: HTMA; WMO: 63895

Summary
- Airport type: Public
- Owner: Government of Tanzania
- Operator: Tanzania Airports Authority
- Serves: Kilindoni
- Location: Mafia Island, Mafia District, Pwani Region, Tanzania
- Elevation AMSL: 79 ft / 24 m
- Coordinates: 7°54′50″S 39°40′00″E
- Website: www.taa.go.tz

Map
- Location of airport in Tanzania

Runways
Direction	Length		Surface
Direction	m	ft	Surface
15/33	1,630	5,348	Asphalt

Statistics (2024)
- Passengers: 29,996
- Aircraft movements: 3,929
- Cargo (tonnes): 14
- Sources: TAA TCAA GCM Google Maps

Mafia Airport (Uwanja wa Ndege wa Mafia, in Swahili) (IATA: MFA, ICAO: HTMA) is an airport on Mafia Island in the Mafia District of Pwani Region in Tanzania. The island is located in the Sea of Zanj in the Indian Ocean, 17 kilometres (11 mi) across the Mafia Channel on the Tanzanian mainland coast. In 2013 the landing strip at Mafia Airport was rehabilitated using grant funds provided by the United States government through the Millennium Challenge Corporation. The Mafia non-directional beacon (Ident: MF) is located on the field.

== Airlines and destinations ==
Airlines	Destinations
Auric Air	Dar es Salaam
Coastal Aviation	Dar es Salaam, Pemba, Selous, Tanga, Zanzibar
Tropical Air	Dar es Salaam

== See also ==
- List of airports in Tanzania
- Transport in Tanzania
