= Sumbawanga Airport =

Sumbawanga Airport Uwanja wa Ndege wa Sumbawanga (Swahili)
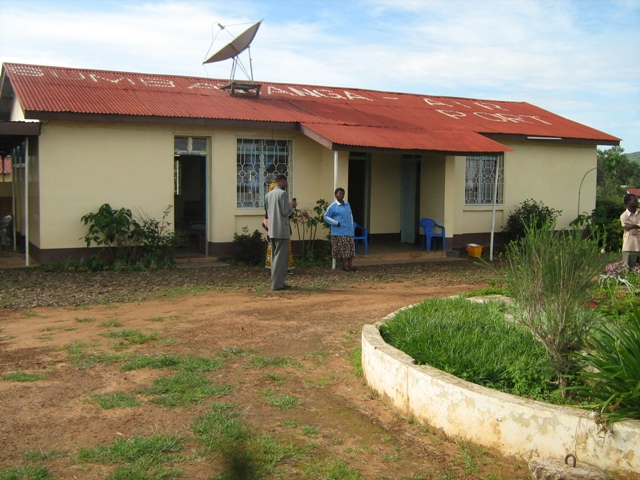
- IATA: SUT; ICAO: HTSU; WMO: 63881

Summary
- Airport type: Public
- Owner: Government of Tanzania
- Operator: Tanzania Airports Authority
- Location: Sumbawanga, Tanzania
- Elevation AMSL: 5,920 ft / 1,804 m
- Coordinates: 7°56′56″S 31°36′37″E
- Website: www.taa.go.tz

Map
- Location of airport in Tanzania

Runways
Direction	Length		Surface
Direction	m	ft	Surface
07/25	1,428	4,685	GRE

Statistics (2009)
- Passengers: 806
- Sources: GCM Google Maps

Sumbawanga Airport (IATA: SUT, ICAO: HTSU) is an airport in western Tanzania serving the town of Sumbawanga in Rukwa Region. The government has sought funds from the European Investment Bank for the upgrade of the airport.

Stella Manyanga, the Rukwa Regional Commissioner has instead urged the government to construct a new airport at Kisumba village as the present facility does not have enough land for future expansion. In April 2013, the Tanzania Airports Authority allocated funds for the evaluation of the area for the proposed future airport.

== See also ==
- List of airports in Tanzania
- Transport in Tanzania
