= PMA =

PMA may refer to:

== Organizations ==
- Pacific Maritime Association
- Pacific Missionary Aviation
- Pakistan Marine Academy
- Pakistan Military Academy
- Palestine Monetary Authority
- Pemba Airport (Tanzania) (IATA airport code)
- People's Municipal Assembly
- Phi Mu Alpha Sinfonia
- Philadelphia Museum of Art
- Philippine Military Academy
- Photo Marketing Association
- PMA Group, a lobbying firm in the US
- Policia Militar Ambulante (Mobile Military Police, Ambulant Military Police or PMA) was an elite paramilitary corp active in Guatemala during the Guatemalan Civil War.
- Power Marketing Administration
- Power Matters Alliance, a consortium promoting a wireless charging standard
- Presentation of Mary Academy
- President's Management Agenda, US
- Produce Marketing Association
- Publishers Marketing Association
- Puckapunyal Military Area, Australia

== Science and technology ==
- para-Methoxyamphetamine, an amphetamine derivative
- Phorbol 12-myristate 13-acetate, a transient PKC stimulator
- Phosphomolybdic acid, used as a thin-layer chromatography stain
- Poly(methyl acrylate), a synthetic acrylate polymer
- Principles of Mathematical Analysis, a real analysis textbook
- Progressive muscular atrophy, a neurodegenerative muscle-wasting disease
- Propidium monoazide, a fluorescent dye
- Psychomotor agitation, unintentional and purposeless movements accompanying some health conditions (depression, anxiety, and others)

=== Technology and engineering ===
- Persistent Management Agent, defined by Broadband Forum WT-318
- phpMyAdmin, management tool of a MySQL database
- Physical Medium Attachment in computer network protocols is a sublayer of physical layer
- Program Memory Area, of a CDRW
- Pressurized Mating Adapter, for docking a spacecraft to the International Space Station
- Post mortem analysis, a technical analysis of a finished project
- Parts Manufacturer Approval, a U.S. government approval for manufacture of aircraft parts
- Premarket approval, a U.S. government approval for medical devices

== Humanities ==
- Positive mental attitude, a philosophy of having an optimistic disposition in every situation
- Post mortem auctoris, a Latin term meaning "after the author's death", most often used in determining copyright

== Other uses ==
- Performance Monitoring for Action, a survey held at intervals in Burkina Faso
- "PMA" (song), a 2021 song by All Time Low
- "PMA", a 2012 song by Lower Than Atlantis from their album Changing Tune
