= NA-210 Sanghar-II =

Constituency of the National Assembly of Pakistan

- Constituency for the National Assembly of Pakistan
- Region: Tando Adam Khan Tehsil and Shahdadpur Tehsil Sinjhoro Tehsil (partly) of Sanghar District
- Electorate: 600,865

Current constituency
- Party: Pakistan People's Party
- Member(s): Salahuddin Junejo
- Created from: NA-236 Sanghar-III and NA-211 Sanghar-III

NA-210 Sanghar-II (این اے-210، سانگھڑ-2) is a constituency for the National Assembly of Pakistan.

== Assembly Segments ==
Constituency number	Constituency	District	Current MPA	Party
43	PS-43 Sanghar-IV	Sanghar District	Sardar Paras Dero	PPP
44	PS-44 Sanghar-V	Sanghar District	Shahid Abdul Salam Thahim	PPP

== Election 2002 ==
General elections were held on 10 October 2002. Muhammad Khan Junejo of PML-F won by 66,543 votes.

General election 2002: NA-236 Sanghar-III
Party	Candidate	Votes	%	±%
PML(F)	Muhammad Khan Junejo	66,543	50.14	
PPP	Fida Hussain Dero	56,628	42.67	
MQM	Muhammad Hashim Chandio	8,413	6.34	
Others	Others (seven candidates)	1,122	0.85	
Turnout		133,751	45.97	
Total valid votes		132,706	99.22	
Rejected ballots		1,045	0.78	
Majority		9,915	7.47	
Registered electors		290,977		

== Election 2008 ==
General elections were held on 18 February 2008. Roshan Din Junejo of PPP won by 71,394 votes.

General election 2008: NA-236 Sanghar-III
Party	Candidate	Votes	%	±%
PPP	Roshan Din Junejo	90,311	63.95	
PML(F)	Jam Mashooque Ali	49,483	35.04	
Others	Others (eleven candidates)	1,438	1.01	
Turnout		144,674	50.44	
Total valid votes		141,232	97.62	
Rejected ballots		3,442	2.38	
Majority		40,828	29.91	
Registered electors		286,799		
PPP gain from PML(F)				

== Election 2013 ==
General elections were held on 11 May 2013. Roshan Din Junejo of PPP won by 90,787 votes and became the member of National Assembly.

General election 2013: NA-236 Sanghar-III
Party	Candidate	Votes	%	±%
PPP	Roshan Din Junejo	100,906	50.65	
PML(F)	Imamuddin Shaookeen	85,532	42.93	
MQM	Muhammad Ayoub Shaikh	10,034	5.04	
Others	Others (eleven candidates)	2,753	1.38	
Turnout		204,271	61.59	
Total valid votes		199,225	97.53	
Rejected ballots		5,046	2.47	
Majority		15,374	7.72	
Registered electors		331,648		
PPP hold				

== Election 2018 ==
General elections were held on 25 July 2018.

General election 2018: NA-217 Sanghar-III
Party	Candidate	Votes	%	±%
PPP	Roshan Din Junejo	103,232	64.93	
GDA	Mehar Ali Alias Mahi Khan	43,769	27.53	
MMA	Akbar Hussain Chugtai	7,566	4.76	
MQM-P	Muhammad Shakil Rajput	977	0.61	
Independent	Zafar Ali	665	0.42	
Pasban-e-Pakistan	Muhammad Saleem	631	0.40	
Jamiat Ulema-e-Pakistan	Muhammad Mubeen	543	0.34	
Independent	Paras Dero	493	0.31	
Independent	Ghualm Mujtaba Soomro	413	413	
Independent	Shakeel Ahmed Urf Karimdad	245	0.15	
SUP	Abdul Aziz Thahim	151	0.10	
Independent	Salahuddin Junejo	124	0.08	
Independent	Niaz Hussain	110	0.07	
Independent	Ghayas Uddin	60	0.04	
Turnout		165,368	47.87	
Total valid votes		158,979	96.14	
Rejected ballots		6,389	3.86	
Majority		59,461	37.40	
Registered electors		345,422		
PPP hold				

== Election 2024 ==
Elections were held on 8 February 2024. Salahuddin Junejo won the election with 150,196 votes.

General election 2024: NA-210 Sanghar-II
Party	Candidate	Votes	%	±%
PPP	Salahuddin Junejo	150,196	54.60	▼10.33
GDA	Saira Bano	108,194	39.33	▲11.80
Others	Others (ten candidates)	16,681	6.06	
Turnout		283,077	47.11	▼0.76
Total valid votes		275,071	97.17	
Rejected ballots		8,006	2.83	
Majority		42,002	15.27	▼22.13
Registered electors		600,865		
PPP hold				

== See also ==
- NA-209 Sanghar-I
- NA-211 Mirpur Khas-I
