= Mbeya Airport =

Airport in Mbeya Region, Tanzania

Mbeya Airport Uwanja wa Ndege wa Mbeya (Swahili)
- IATA: MBI; ICAO: HTMB; WMO: 63932

Summary
- Airport type: Public
- Owner: Government of Tanzania
- Operator: Tanzania Airports Authority
- Location: Mbeya Region, Tanzania
- Elevation AMSL: 5,600 ft (1,700 m)
- Coordinates: 8°55′10″S 33°27′50″E
- Website: www.taa.go.tz

Map
- Location of airport in Tanzania

Runways
Direction	Length		Surface
Direction	m	ft	Surface
13/31	1,569	5,148	Dirt
- Sources: TCAA Google Maps GCM

Mbeya Airport (IATA: MBI, ICAO: HTMB) is an airport located in Mbeya Region, Tanzania. The airport is small and serves the city of Mbeya. It is within the southern section of the city.

The Mbeya non-directional beacon (Ident: MB) is located on the field.

A new, larger airport at Songwe, 20 kilometres (12 mi) west of the city, was opened in December 2012 and also serves Mbeya and Songwe Region.

== Airlines and destinations ==
Airlines	Destinations
Tropical Air	Zanzibar

== See also ==
- List of airports in Tanzania
- Transport in Tanzania
