= Kimweri Mputa Magogo =

Last king of the Kilindi Dynasty of Usambara, Tanga

- King of the Usambara, Tanga
- Kimweri Mputa Magogo
- Reign: 1947 – 1962
- Predecessor: Shebughe Magogo of Usambara
- Born: 1914; Korogwe District, Tanga Region
- Died: September 20, 2000; Mombo, Korogwe District, Tanga Region, Tanzania
- Issue (among others)
Names
- Kimweri Mputa Magogo Shubughe
- Dynasty: Kilindi
- Father: Shebughe Magogo

Kimweri Mpuata Magogo or Mputa II (1914 – 20 September 2000), also known as (Simbe Mwene), (Simbe Mwene Kimweri Mputa Magogo in Shamabaa), (Mfalme Kimweri, in Swahili) was the last king of the Shambaa people of the Usambara Mountains in what is now Tanga Region of Tanzania between around 1947 and 1962. He was the last of the Kilindi dynasty to be recognized as having authority, which was removed in 1962 after Tanzanian independence.

== Background and short reign ==
Kimweri Mputa Magogo belonged to the Kilindi dynasty founded by Mbegha, who united the Shambaa people into one kingdom. The kingdom reached its height in the early 19th century under Kimweri ye Nyumbai (died 1862), but by 1840 was already losing control to the better-armed Zigula people in the plains. The Sambaa yielded to the German colonialists in the 1880s without putted up resistance, although members of the dynasty continued to be nominal rulers.

Kimweri was born in 1914. He was son of Shebughe Magogo, who had been forced to abdicate, and a descendant of Semboja, the trading chief. Kimweri Mputa Magogo, or Mputa II, became Lion King in 1947.

Unlike his father he was well-educated, and was the choice of the colonial authorities. His appointment as sub-chief at Vugha, in line to later become paramount chief, was formally announced by D.M. Piggott, the district commissioner, on 23 February 1948. In the late 1940s and 1950s he tried to form a coalition supporting the government's Usambara erosion control scheme, bringing together devout Muslims, merchants and wealthy farmers. He was opposed by educated peasants, representing the poorer peasants whose livelihoods were threatened by the scheme. The main rain chiefs quietly supported the peasants.

== Legacy ==
Kimweri Mputa Magogo wanted to emulate his great ancestor Kimweri ye Nyumbai, who had placed his own men as chiefs in all the locations of Shambaai as he chose. However, Kimweri ye Nyumbai had been able to do so in part because he was backed up by warriors and in part because he owned the main rain charms. Kimweri Mputa Magogo did not have armed men and it was agreed that he did not control the rain. The rain charms had been inherited by Kinyashi's sons. His title and those of other traditional kings and chiefs was abolished by the government in 1962. He left his traditional seat and went to live at Mombo. Kimweri Mputa Magogo died on 20 September 2000.

== Sources ==
- Feierman, Steven M. (1990-11-14). Peasant Intellectuals: Anthropology and History in Tanzania. Univ of Wisconsin Press. p. 172. ISBN 978-0-299-12523-3.
- Finke, Jens (2003). Tanzania. Rough Guides. ISBN 978-1-85828-783-6.
- Geographical Association of Tanzania (1973). Journal of the Geographical Association of Tanzania.
- "Kimweri Mputa Magogo". Mwela Theatre Group. 20 December 2010.
