= Kajunguti International Airport =

Proposed airport in Kagera Region, Tanzania

Kajunguti International Airport – Proposed airport –
- IATA: none; ICAO: HT??

Summary
- Airport type: Public
- Owner: Government of Tanzania
- Operator: Tanzania Airports Authority
- Serves: Bukoba
- Location: Misenyi, Kagera, Tanzania
- Coordinates: 1°13′7″S 31°25′30″E

Map
- Proposed location of Kajunguti International Airport Kajunguti (Africa) Kajunguti (Earth)

Runways
Direction	Length		Surface
Direction	m	ft	Surface
TBD	-	-	Asphalt

Kajunguti International Airport (Swahili: Uwanja wa Ndege wa Kimataifa wa Kajunguti) is a proposed international airport project in Kagera Region, Tanzania intended to serve the African Great Lakes region.

== Background ==
Initial plans for the airport were first mentioned in the 2010 election manifesto of the Chama Cha Mapinduzi, Tanzania's ruling party, as the present Bukoba Airport cannot accommodate larger aircraft.

== Project ==
The airport will be located at Kajunguti Village in Misenyi District. It will occupy an area of at least 15,000 hectares and its design is inspired by Japan's Kansai International Airport. The Tanzania Airports Authority will compensate villagers affected by this project with TSh 12 billion (US$7 million). As of August 2013, funding had not yet been secured, thus delaying the project by 4–5 years.
