= Saira Bano (politician) =

Pakistani politician

Member of the National Assembly of Pakistan
- In office 13 August 2018 – 10 August 2023
- Constituency: Reserved seat for women

Personal details
- Party: Grand Democratic Alliance (2018-present)
- Spouse: Kaleemullah Wassan
- Children: Muhammad Dawood Ghulamullah
- Profession: Politician

Saira Bano (Urdu: سائرہ بانو) is a Pakistani politician and public figure. She had remained a member of the National Assembly of Pakistan from August 2018 till August 2023.

== Political career ==
Saira Bano was elected to the National Assembly of Pakistan as a candidate of the Grand Democratic Alliance (GDA) on a reserved seat for women from Sindh in 2018 Pakistani general election.

Bano came into the spotlight suddenly after the ousting of Prime Minister Imran Khan through a no-confidence motion and all the MNAs of Imran Khan's political party PTI decided a boycott from National Assembly of Pakistan, alleging ousting as "Regime Change Operation". After these events opposition benches were almost empty except a few members (GDA's only member or PMA's members). So the next Prime Minister Shahbaz Sharif's government was seemingly having no opposition and it was seemed as if they have gotten free hand to do whatsoever they want.

In the budget 2023-24, heavy taxes were imposed on public, industries and fuel prices, resulting historic inflation rate raised in Pakistan. At such critical time, Bano became the spokesperson of helpless public in the National Assembly of Pakistan.

== More reading ==
- List of members of the 15th National Assembly of Pakistan
- No-confidence motion against Imran Khan
