= Roshan Din Junejo =

Pakistani politician

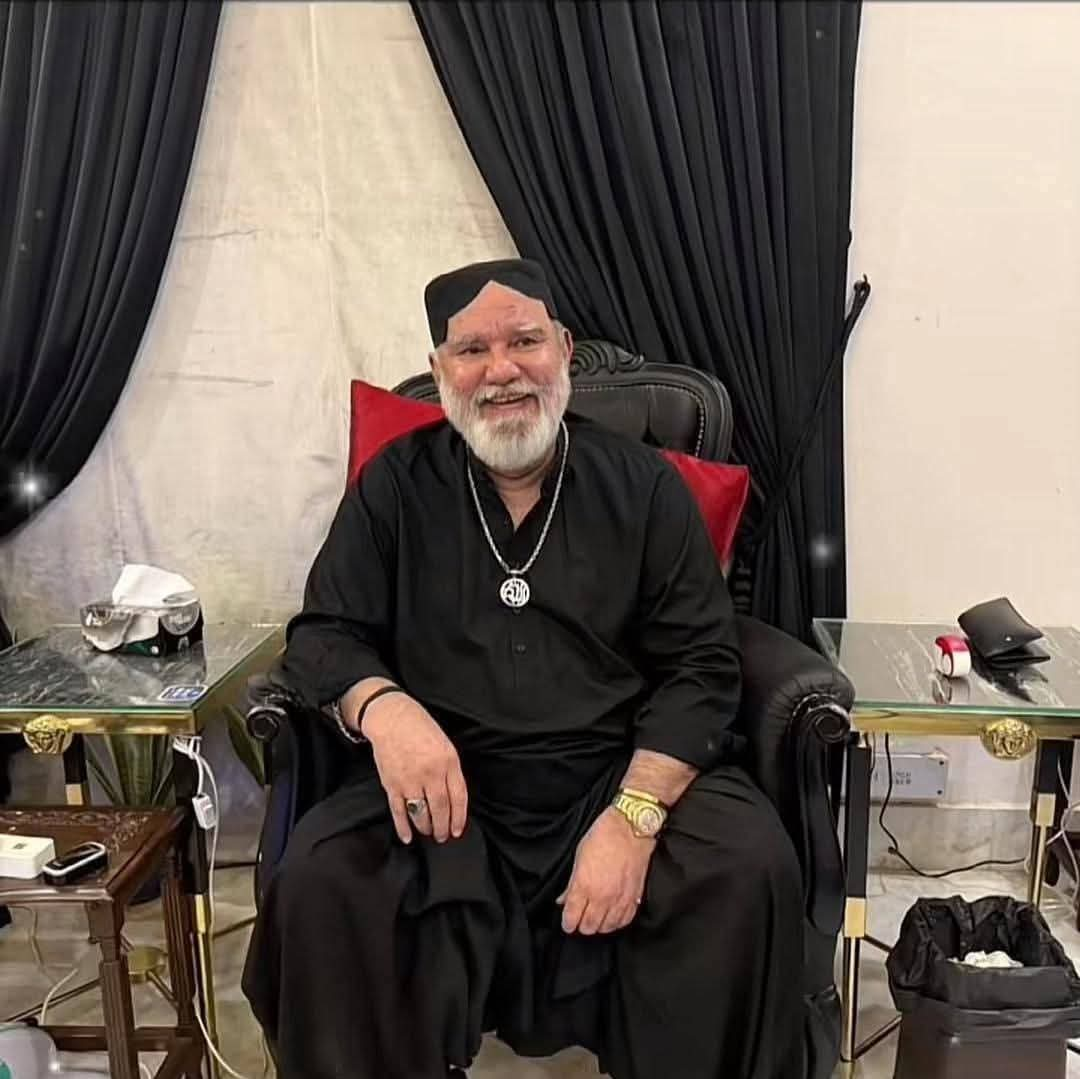
- Roshan Din Junejo

Member of the National Assembly of Pakistan
- In office 13 August 2018 – 10 August 2023
- Constituency: NA-217 (Sanghar-III)
- In office 2008 – 31 May 2018
- Constituency: NA-236 (Sanghar-II)

Personal details
- Born: January 1, 1951
- Died: September 15, 2025 (aged 74) Islamabad, Pakistan
- Cause of death: Heart attack
- Resting place: Tando Adam, Sindh, Pakistan
- Other political affiliations: PPP (2008–2023)

Roshan Din Junejo (Sindhi:روشن دين جوڻيجو; Urdu: روشن دین جونیجو; 1 January 1951 – 15 September 2025) was a Pakistani politician who served as a member of the National Assembly of Pakistan from August 2018 to August 2023. Previously, he was a member of the National Assembly from 2008 to May 2018. He died on 15 September 2025 in Islamabad due to heart attack.

== Death ==
Roshan Din Junejo died of a heart attack on 15 September 2025 in Islamabad. He was buried in his hometown of Tando Adam, Sindh.

== Early life ==
He was born on 1 January 1951.

== Political career ==
He was elected to the National Assembly of Pakistan as a candidate of Pakistan Peoples Party (PPP) from Constituency NA-236 (Sanghar-II) in the 2008 Pakistani general election. He received 90,311 votes and defeated Jam Mashooq Ali, a candidate of Pakistan Muslim League (F) (PML-F).

He was re-elected to the National Assembly as a candidate of PPP from Constituency NA-236 (Sanghar-II) in the 2013 Pakistani general election. He received 100,906 votes and defeated Imamuddin Shouqeen, a candidate of PML-F.

He was re-elected to the National Assembly as a candidate of PPP from Constituency NA-217 (Sanghar-III) in the 2018 Pakistani general election.
