= Songea Airport =

Songea Airport Uwanja wa Ndege wa Songea (Swahili)
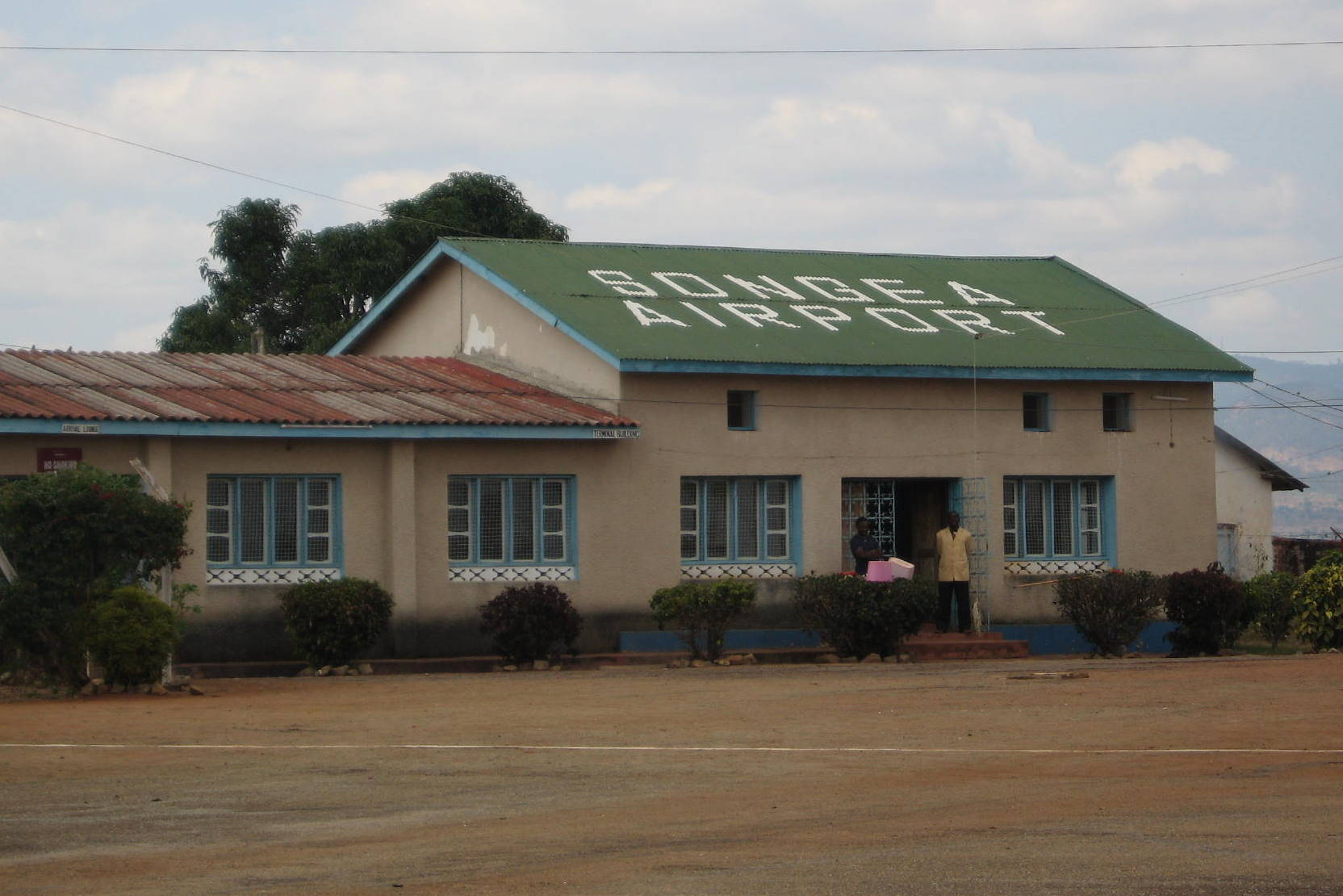
- IATA: SGX; ICAO: HTSO; WMO: 63962

Summary
- Airport type: Public
- Owner: Government of Tanzania
- Operator: Tanzania Airports Authority
- Location: Songea, Tanzania
- Elevation AMSL: 3,445 ft / 1,050 m
- Coordinates: 10°41′00″S 35°35′00″E
- Website: www.taa.go.tz

Map
- Location of airport in Tanzania

Runways
Direction	Length		Surface
Direction	m	ft	Surface
14/32	1,628	5,341	Asphalt

Statistics (2024)
- Passengers: 19,766
- Aircraft movements: 441
- Cargo (tonnes): 209
- Sources: TAA GCM Google Maps TCAA

Songea Airport (IATA: SGX, ICAO: HTSO) is an airport in southern Tanzania serving the town of Songea and the surrounding Ruvuma Region. The runway is 7 kilometres (4.3 mi) west of the municipality.

The Songea non-directional beacon (Ident: SG) is located on the field.

== Airlines and destinations ==
Airlines	Destinations
Air Tanzania	Dar es Salaam, Mtwara

== See also ==
- List of airports in Tanzania
- Transport in Tanzania
