= Nachingwea Airport =

Airport located in Lindi Region, Tanzania

Nachingwea Airport Uwanja wa Ndege wa Nachingwea (Swahili)
- IATA: NCH; ICAO: HTNA; WMO: 63969

Summary
- Airport type: Public
- Owner: Government of Tanzania
- Operator: Tanzania Airports Authority
- Serves: Nachingwea
- Location: Lindi Region, Tanzania
- Elevation AMSL: 1,400 ft / 427 m
- Coordinates: 10°21′25″S 38°46′45″E

Map
- Location of airport in Tanzania

Runways
Direction	Length		Surface
Direction	m	ft	Surface
14/32	1,795	5,889	Gravel
- Sources: TCAA GCM Google Maps

Nachingwea Airport (IATA: NCH, ICAO: HTNA) is a domestic airport locate in south Lindi Region, Tanzania. The airport serves the town Nachingwea. It is on the northeast side of the town.

== See also ==
- List of airports in Tanzania
- Transport in Tanzania
