= East African Airways Flight 104 =

1955 aviation incident in Africa

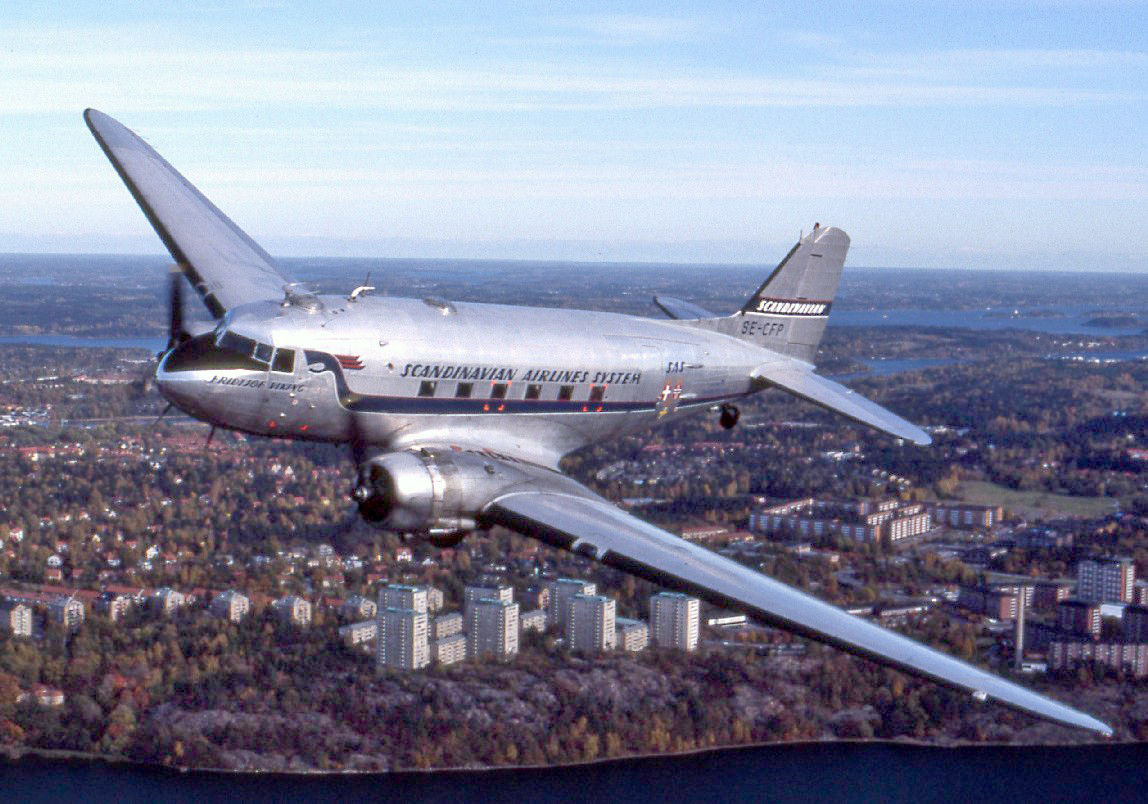
- A Douglas DC-3 similar to the aircraft involved

Accident
- Date: 18 May 1955
- Summary: Controlled flight into terrain
- Site: Mawenzi Peak, Mount Kilimanjaro, Tanganyika (now Tanzania)

Aircraft
- Aircraft type: Douglas DC-3
- Operator: East African Airways
- Registration: VP-KKH
- Flight origin: Dar es Salaam Airport, Tanganyika
- Destination: Wilson Airport, Nairobi, Kenya
- Occupants: 20
- Passengers: 16
- Crew: 4
- Fatalities: 20
- Injuries: 0
- Survivors: 0

East African Airways Flight 104 nicknamed Titanic on Mount Kilamajaro was a scheduled passenger flight operated by East African Airways using a Douglas DC-3 aircraft, registered as VP-KKH. On 18 May 1955, the aircraft crashed on Mount Kilimanjaro during its flight from Dar es Salaam to Nairobi, killing all 20 people on board. The wreckage was discovered four days later on the southeast slope of the Mawenzi peak of Kilimanjaro.

== Flight and crash ==
The aircraft departed Dar es Salaam at 10:39 local time on 18 May 1955, bound for Wilson Airport in Nairobi. The last radio transmission from the pilot was received at 11:56, reporting the aircraft's position over Lake Jipe while flying visually above the clouds at flight level 105 (approximately 10,500 feet). No further communication was received.

The wreckage was discovered on 22 May 1955 on the southeastern slope of Mawenzi, the more rugged and less accessible of Kilimanjaro's two main peaks, at an elevation of 15,200 feet above sea level. All on board were confirmed dead.

== Investigation ==
Investigators reached the crash site on 25 May 1955. The aircraft had struck the ridge of Mawenzi at 15,200 feet and exploded on impact. The fire appeared concentrated around the central fuel tanks. The aircraft's nose hit first, after which it flipped and fell into a ravine.

An official investigation determined that the pilot had made the decision to proceed on a direct route to Nairobi without consulting meteorological forecasters, despite marginal weather conditions. The investigation suggested that, had he received weather advice, he might have diverted via Tanga. The pilot was relatively new to the airline and may have felt obligated to follow the standard route.

== Aircraft ==
The aircraft was built in 1944 by the Douglas Aircraft Company in Santa Monica, California, and originally served in the Royal Air Force as KP266. By 1952, it had flown 954 hours before being sold to Eagle Aviation Limited in the United Kingdom and then to East African Airways. It received a comprehensive overhaul and was officially registered in Kenya in late 1952.

At the time of the accident, the aircraft had flown 5,259 total hours, with 1,940 hours since its last overhaul. The engines, manufactured by Pratt and Whitney, had both been recently serviced, the port engine had flown 505 hours since overhaul, and the starboard engine 267 hours. The propellers were fully feathering Hamilton models.

== Legacy ==
In 2024, nearly 70 years after the crash, aviation historians proposed restoring the wreckage and commemorating the site as the only known aircraft crash on Mount Kilimanjaro. A reunion of former East African Airways staff and relatives took place in London to honor the airline’s legacy.
