= Mwadui Airport =

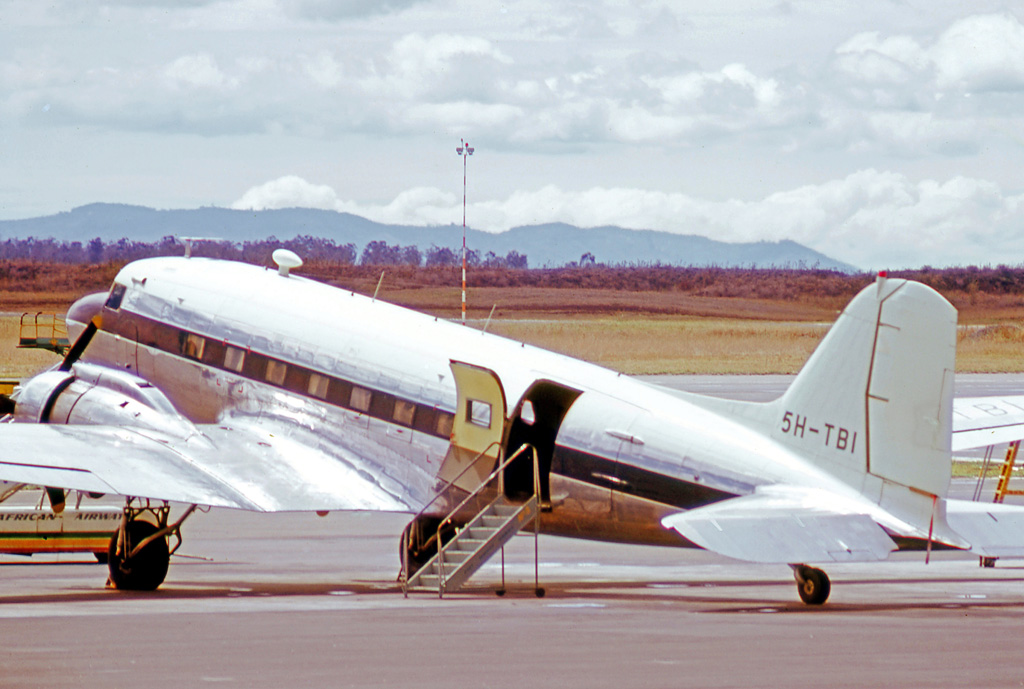
- A Douglas C-47B owned by Williamson Diamonds.
- IATA: MWN; ICAO: HTMD; WMO: 63784

Summary
- Operator: Williamson Diamond Ltd
- Serves: Williamson diamond mine
- Elevation AMSL: 3,970 ft / 1,210 m
- Coordinates: 3°31′10″S 33°37′00″E

Map
- Location of airport in Tanzania

Runways
Direction	Length		Surface
Direction	m	ft	Surface
04/22	1,400	4,593	Gravel
- Sources: TCAA GCM Google Maps

Mwadui Airport (IATA: MWN, ICAO: HTMD) is an airport serving the Williamson diamond mine, in the Shinyanga Region of Tanzania. The runway extends along the east side of the mine pit.

The Mwadui non-directional beacon (Ident: WM) is on the field.

== See also ==
- List of airports in Tanzania
- Transport in Tanzania
