= Coastal Air (Tanzania) =

Private Tanzanian airline

- Coastal Air Cessna 208B Grand Caravan
| IATA | ICAO | Call sign |
|---|---|---|
| CQ | CSV | COASTAL TRAVEL |
- Founded: 1987; 39 years ago
- Hubs: Julius Nyerere International Airport
- Secondary hubs: Arusha Airport
- Fleet size: 22
- Destinations: more than 42
- Headquarters: Dar es Salaam, Tanzania
- Key people: Glenn Orsmond (CEO)
- Employees: 300 (2020)
- Website: coastal.co.tz

Coastal Aviation is an airline that operates out of Julius Nyerere International Airport, Terminal 1, in Dar es Salaam, Tanzania. It services many areas in Tanzania, but also operates regionally to neighboring countries, including Kenya and Rwanda.

== Location ==
The company's main office is located at the Slipway, Masaki, in Dar es Salaam, Tanzania's largest city and the country's business and financial capital. The geographical coordinates of the company's headquarters are:06°52'25.0"S, 39°12'07.0"E (Latitude:-6.873611; Longitude:39.201944). The company slogan is "The Flying Safari Company."

== Overview ==
Coastal Aviation started out as a purely charter airline in 1987. As of May 2020, charter forms a significant percentage of its business, including scenic and medevac flights. However it also maintains a scheduled service, operating mainly from Dar es Salaam Airport and Arusha Airport. After starting with a single aircraft operating between Dar es Salaam and Selous Game Reserve, Coastal Aviation has evolved into a flying safari airline in Eastern Africa, with a fleet of 14 aircraft and flights to more than 42 destinations spanning Tanzania, Kenya and Rwanda.

As of May 2020, the airline employed about 300 staff members. In 2019, a total of approximately 150,000 passengers traveled with the airline.

== Destinations ==
Cessna 208B

This is a partial list of Coastal Aviation's destinations (Schedule and Charter).

| Country | City | Airport | Notes | Refs |
|---|---|---|---|---|
| Tanzania | Arusha | Arusha Airport | Hub | |
| Tanzania | Iringa | Iringa Airport | | |
| Tanzania | Moshi | Kilimanjaro International Airport | | |
| Tanzania | Kilwa | Kilwa Masoko Airport | | |
| Tanzania | Mafia Island | Mafia Airport | | |
| Tanzania | Mwanza | Mwanza Airport | | |
| Tanzania | Lake Manyara | Lake Manyara Airport | | |
| Tanzania | Tanga | Tanga Airport | | |
| Tanzania | Tarime | Tarime Airstrip | | |
| Tanzania | Pemba Island | Pemba Airport | | |
| Tanzania | Selous Game Reserve | Mtemere Airstrip | | |
| Tanzania | Serengeti National Park | Seronera Airstrip | | |
| Tanzania | Zanzibar | Zanzibar International Airport | | |
| Tanzania | Dar es Salaam | Julius Nyerere International Airport | Hub | |
| Kenya | Nairobi | Wilson Airport | | |
| Kenya | Nairobi | Jomo Kenyatta International Airport | | |
| Kenya | Migori | Migori Airport | | |
| Rwanda | Kigali | Kigali International Airport | | |

== Fleet ==
As of December 2020, Coastal Aviation operated a fleet of 22 aircraft, comprising the following aircraft types.

Coastal Aviation fleet
| Aircraft | In fleet | Orders | Passengers | | | | Notes |
| Aircraft | In fleet | Orders | C | P | Y | Total | Notes |
|---|---|---|---|---|---|---|---|
| Cessna 208 Caravan | 16 | – | – | – | 12 | 12 | |
| Pilatus PC-12 | 6 | — | — | — | 9 | 9 | |
| Total | 22 | | | | | | |

== Accidents and incidents ==
On 15 November 2017, at 11.00 local time, a Cessna 208B Grand Caravan, registration number 5H-EGG, with one pilot and ten tourists, crashed in unclear circumstances. The plane was in flight to Serengeti National Park and the accident occurred near Empakaai Camp, in Arusha Region. All 11 people on board died.

On 25 October 2017, at 1430 local time, a Cessna 208B Grand Caravan, registration number 5H-THR, with one pilot and ten passengers, crashed after landing at Lobo Airstrip in Serengeti National Park. After touchdown, the pilot lost control of the aircraft, which veered to the left and struck a tree. The pilot and two passengers were injured. Eight other passengers were not hurt. The aircraft was badly damaged.

== See also ==
- Transport in Tanzania
