= Tanzania Civil Aviation Authority =

National aviation regulator

- Mamlaka ya Usafiri wa Anga Tanzania (Swahili)

Government agency overview
- Jurisdiction: Tanzania
- Headquarters: Aviation House, Dar es Salaam
- Motto: "Aviation Safety and Efficiency. Our Commitment. In partnership"
- Minister responsible: Prof. Makame Mbalawa, Minister of Transport
- Government agency executive: Hamza Johari, Director General
- Key document: Tanzania Civil Aviation Act Cap 80 of 2006.
- Website: www.tcaa.go.tz

The Tanzania Civil Aviation Authority (TCAA; Swahili: Mamlaka ya Usafiri wa Anga Tanzania) is the government body that regulates air services and airport services, and provides air navigation services, in Tanzania. It was founded by an Act of Parliament in 2003 and operates under the purview of the Ministry of Infrastructure Development. The TCAA is responsible for the disposition of aviation safety and for the licensing of aviation personnel. It is also responsible for contributing to the financial oversight of Tanzania's air infrastructure development; the registration of aircraft; for the investigation of air accidents; for local area search and rescue; and in conjunction with the Tanzania Airports Authority, for the operation of airports and aerodromes.

The head office of the TCAA is located in the Aviation House building in the Banana Ukonga Area of Dar es Salaam. Previously the head office was located jointly on the second floor of the IPS Building and the fourth floor of the TETEX Building in Dar es Salaam.

== History ==
=== 2016 ===
The Ministry of Works, Communication and Transport appoints Mr. Hamza Johari as the new Director general of the Authority, replacing Mr Redemptus Bugomola, who was the acting director general.

== See also ==
- Civil aviation authority
- Tanzania Airports Authority
- Transport in Tanzania
