= Nduli =

Ward in Iringa, Tanzania

Nduli Kata ya Nduli
- Ward
- Location within Tanzania Location within Africa
- Coordinates: 7°40′S 35°46′E
- Country: Tanzania
- Region: Iringa Region
- District: Iringa Urban
- Ward: Nduli

Population (2016)
  - Total: 6,933
- Time zone: UTC+3 (EAT)
- Postcode: 51115

Nduli is an administrative ward in the Iringa Rural district of the Iringa Region of Tanzania. In 2016 the Tanzania National Bureau of Statistics report there were 6,933 people in the ward, from 6,626 in 2012.

== Neighborhoods ==
The ward has 11 neighborhoods.

- Igungandembwe
- Kilimahewa
- Kipululu
- Kisowele
- Mapanda
- Mibata
- Mji Mwema
- Msisina
- Mtalagala
- Njia Panda
- Sombeli
