= Mtemere Airstrip =

Mtemere Airstrip Uwanja mdogo wa Ndege wa Mtemere
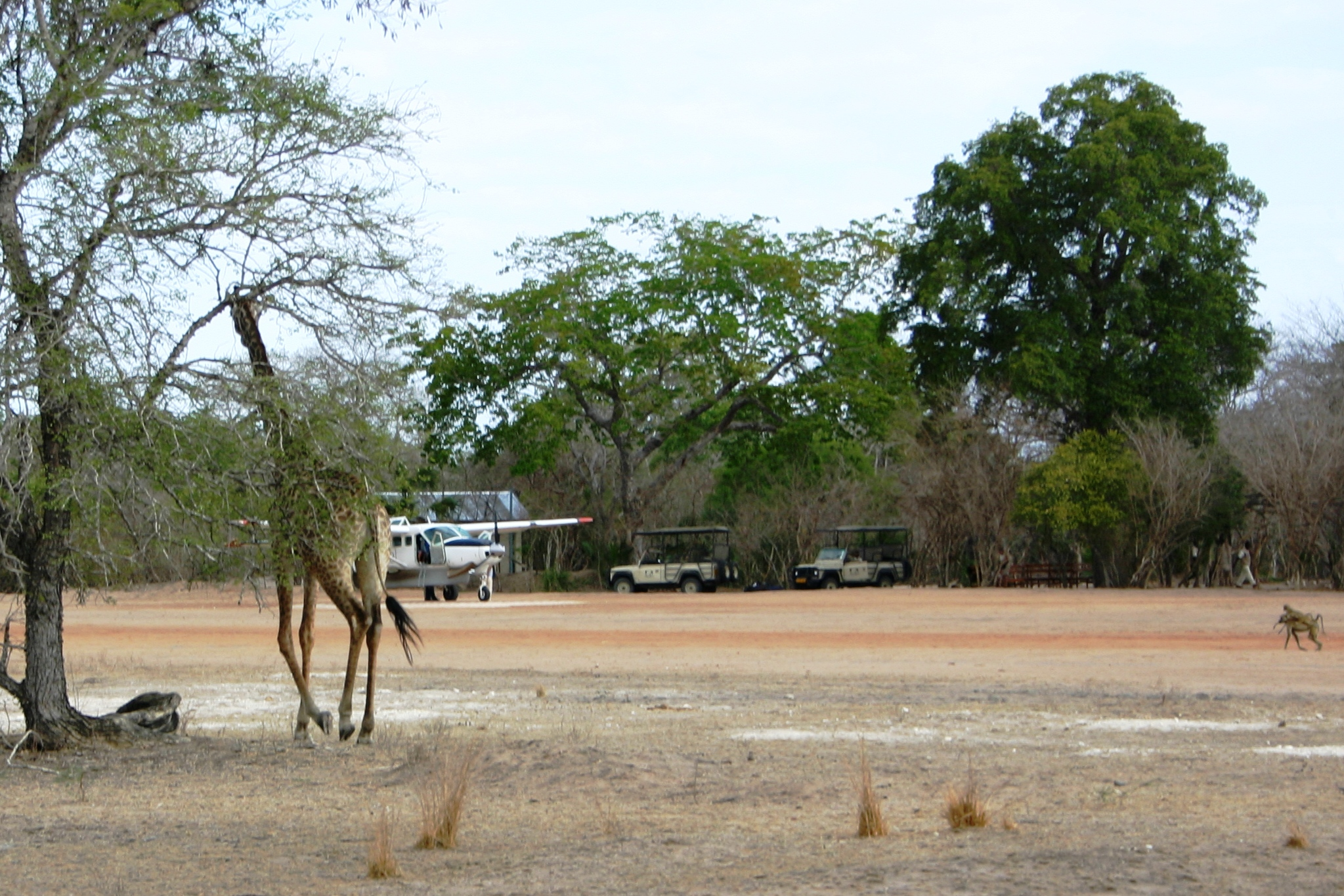
- IATA: none; ICAO: none

Summary
- Airport type: Public
- Owner: Government of Tanzania
- Operator: Director of Game, MNRT
- Location: Selous Game Reserve
- Elevation AMSL: 194 ft / 59 m
- Coordinates: 7°45′00″S 38°12′30″E
- Website: www.mnrt.go.tz

Map
- Location of airstrip in Tanzania Mtemere (Africa)

Runways
Direction	Length		Surface
Direction	m	ft	Surface
09/27	1,232	4,042	Grass
- Sources: Google Maps TCAA

Mtemere Airstrip (TCAA designation: TZ-0048) is an airstrip serving the Selous Game Reserve in Southern Tanzania.

== Airlines and destinations ==
Airlines	Destinations
Coastal Aviation	Dar es Salaam

== See also ==
- List of airports in Tanzania
- Transport in Tanzania
