= Mombo, Tanzania =

Mombo
- Ward
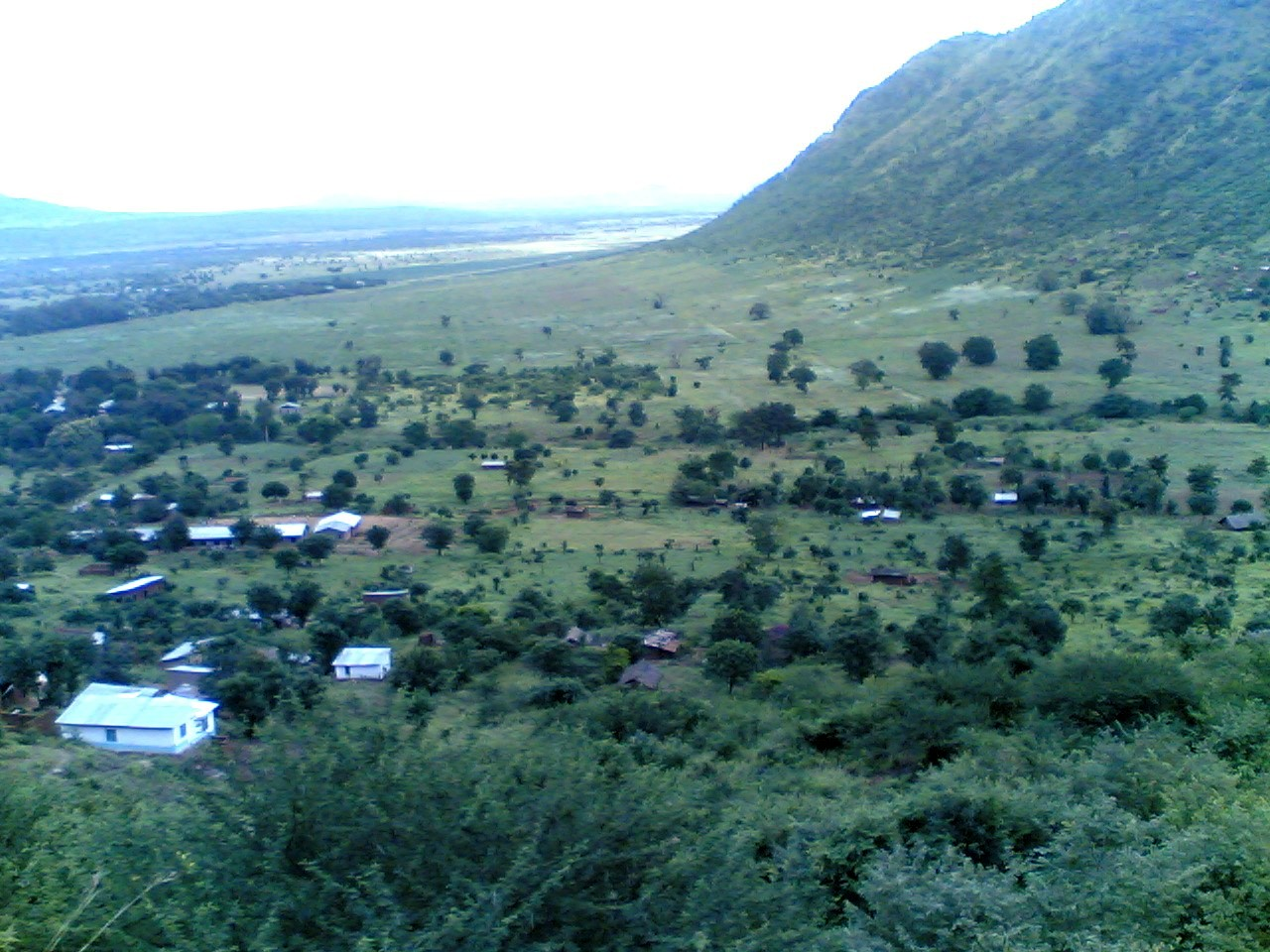

- Location within Tanzania
- Coordinates: 4°53′0″S 38°17′0″E
- Country: Tanzania
- Region: Tanga
- District: Korogwe
- Time zone: GMT+3
- ISO 3166 code: TZ-25

Mombo is one of the 20 wards of the Korogwe District, Tanga Region, Tanzania.

The streets of Mombo; Marembwe, Majengo Mapya, Majengo Kati ya Zamani, Machinjioni, Mawenzi, Fune, Mawasiliano, Nyuma ya Bank, Mwisho wa Shamba, Ndulu A, Ndulu B, JBG, Masimbani, Mafuriko, Hospital, Misajini, Jitengeni, Minarani, Makorakanga, Becco, Stesheni, Sandali
