= Pemba Airport (Tanzania) =

Pemba / Karume Airport Uwanja wa Ndege wa Pemba (Swahili)
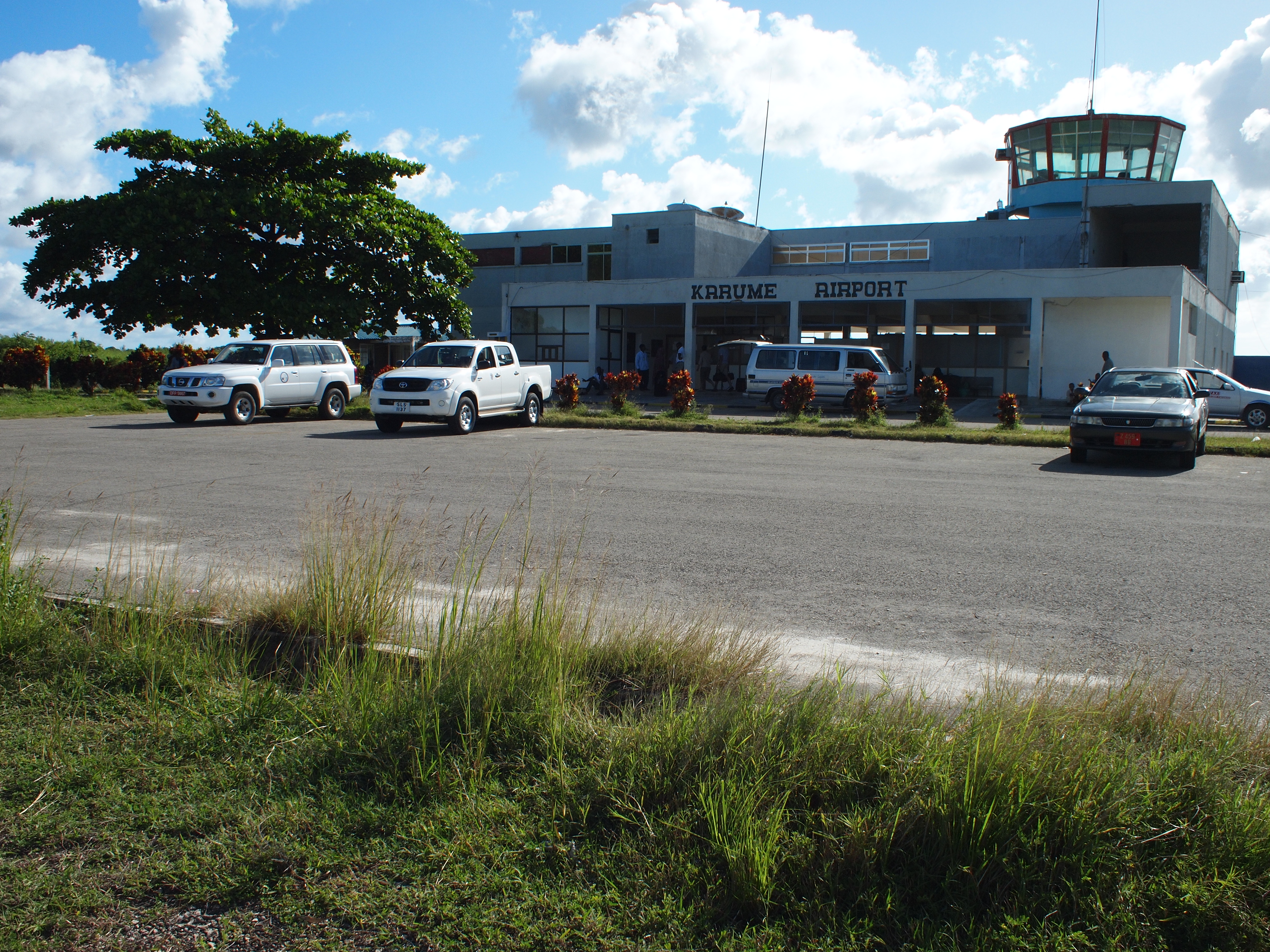
- IATA: PMA; ICAO: HTPE; WMO: 63845

Summary
- Airport type: Public
- Owner: Government of Zanzibar
- Operator: Zanzibar Airports Authority
- Serves: Chake-Chake
- Location: Pemba Island, Zanzibar
- Elevation AMSL: 80 ft (24 m)
- Coordinates: 5°15′30″S 39°48′40″E

Map
- Location of airport in Tanzania

Runways
| Direction | Length | | Surface |
| Direction | m | ft | Surface |
|---|---|---|---|
| 02/20 | 1,517 | 4,977 | Asphalt |
- Sources: GCM Google Maps

Pemba Airport (IATA: PMA, ICAO: HTPE) is an airport in the Zanzibar Archipelago located on Pemba Island. It is also known as Karume Airport and Wawi Airport. It is located approximately 7 kilometres (4.3 mi) southeast of Chake-Chake, the capital of the island. The Zanzibar government is looking into the possibility of renaming the airport to Thabit Kombo Jecha in recognition of his role in the Zanzibar Revolution.

The Pemba non-directional beacon (Ident: PA) is located on the field.

== Airlines and destinations ==
| Airlines | Destinations |
|---|---|
| Air Tanzania | Dar es Salaam, Zanzibar |
| As Salaam Air | Tanga, Zanzibar |
| Auric Air | Dar es Salaam, Mwanza, Tanga, Zanzibar |
| Coastal Aviation | Arusha, Dar es Salaam, Kilwa, Tanga, Zanzibar |
| Tropical Air | Zanzibar |
| ZanAir | Arusha, Dar es Salaam, Zanzibar |

== Accidents and incidents ==
- On 24 January 2014, a ZanAir LET-410 skidded off the runway on landing and impacted a group of bushes, causing substantial damage. There were no reported injuries, and the cause was determined to be a brake failure.

== See also ==
- List of airports in Tanzania
- Transport in Tanzania
