= Tanzania Airports Authority =

Tanzanian government agency

- Mamlaka ya Viwanja vya Ndege Tanzania (Swahili)

Government agency overview
- Formed: 29 November 1999
- Preceding Government agency: Directorate of Aerodromes
- Jurisdiction: Tanzania mainland
- Headquarters: Julius Nyerere International Airport, Julius K. Nyerere Road, Dar es Salaam, Tanzania
- Minister responsible: Makame Mbarawa, Minister of Transport
- Key document: Executive Agency Act Number 30 of 1997
- Website: www.taa.go.tz

Tanzania Airports Authority (TAA) was founded in 1999 by an Act of Parliament. The authority is responsible for the provision of airport services, ground support, infrastructure and construction of airports in Tanzania. The Authority operates under the purview of the Ministry of Infrastructure Development.

TAA main offices are located in Dar es Salaam and at Julius Nyerere International Airport.

== See also ==
- List of airports in Tanzania
- Tanzania Civil Aviation Authority
- Ministry of Infrastructure Development, Tanzania
