= List of airlines of Tanzania =

This is a list of airlines currently operating in Tanzania.

All of the airlines have been banned from flying into the EU since June 2025.

Airline	Image	IATA	ICAO	Callsign	Commenced operations	Notes
Air Excel			XLL	TINGA-TINGA	1997	
Air Tanzania		TC	ATC	TANZANIA	1977	
Air Zara International			AZD		2008	
As Salaam Air					2013	
Auric Air		UI	AUK	AURIC SERVICES	2008	
Coastal Aviation		CQ	CSV	COASTAL TRAVEL	1987	
Flightlink		YS	FLZ	FLIGHTLINK	2004	
Precision Air		PW	PRF	PRECISION AIR	1991	
Regional Air		8N	REG	REGIONAL SERVICES	1997	
Safari Plus					2009	
Fly Safari Air Link Ltd					2008	
Tanzania Government Flight Agency					2002	
Tropical Air					1999	
ZanAir		B4	TAN	ZANAIR	1992	

== See also ==
- List of airlines
- List of defunct airlines of Tanzania
