= List of Cessna 208 Caravan operators =

The Cessna 208 Caravan is used by governmental organizations and by many companies for police, air ambulance, passenger transport, air charter, freight, and parachuting operations. With 233 aircraft, FedEx Express is the largest operator of the Cessna 208.

== Operators ==
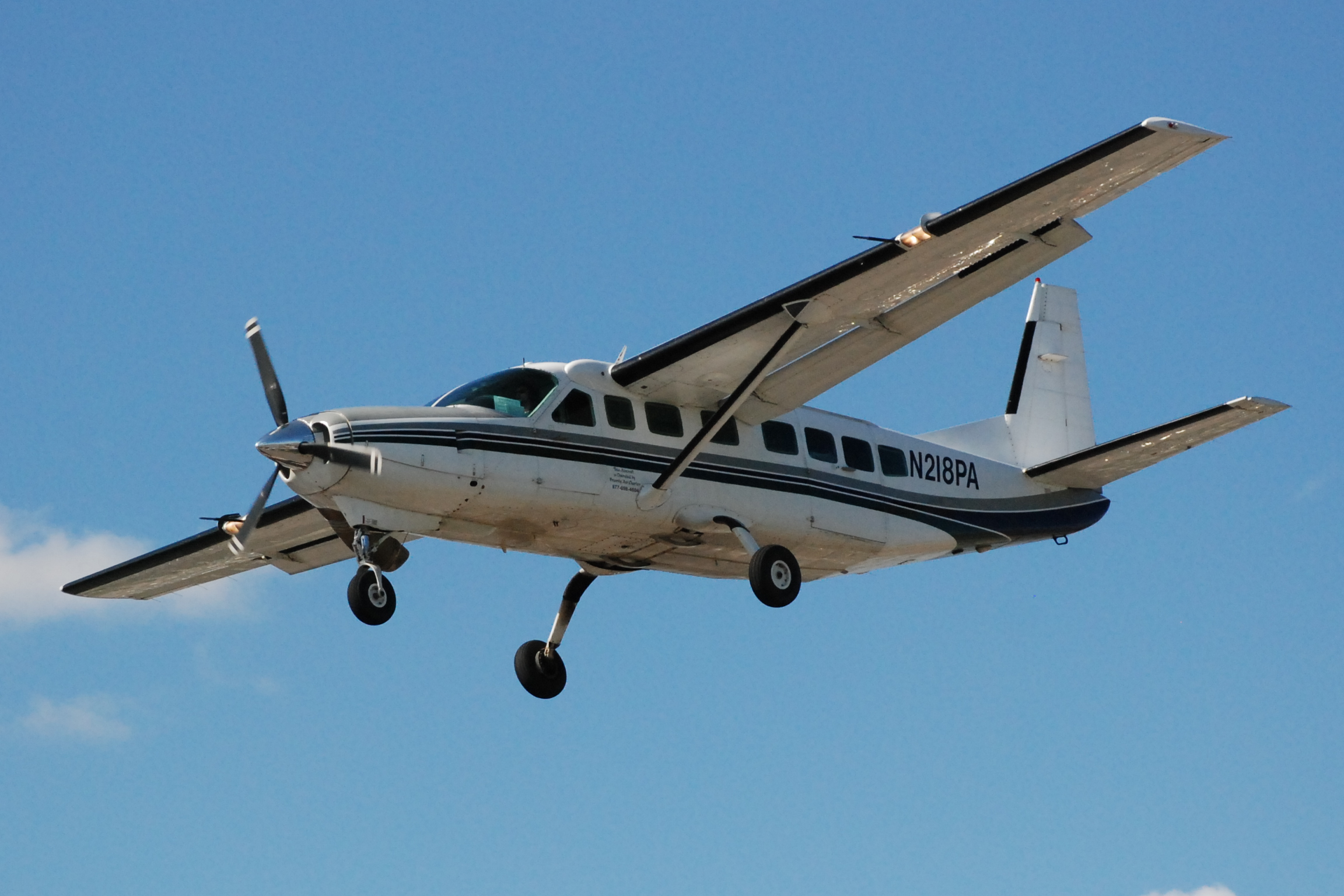
A privately owned Cessna 208 landing

=== Government ===
Argentina

- Argentine Army

Australia

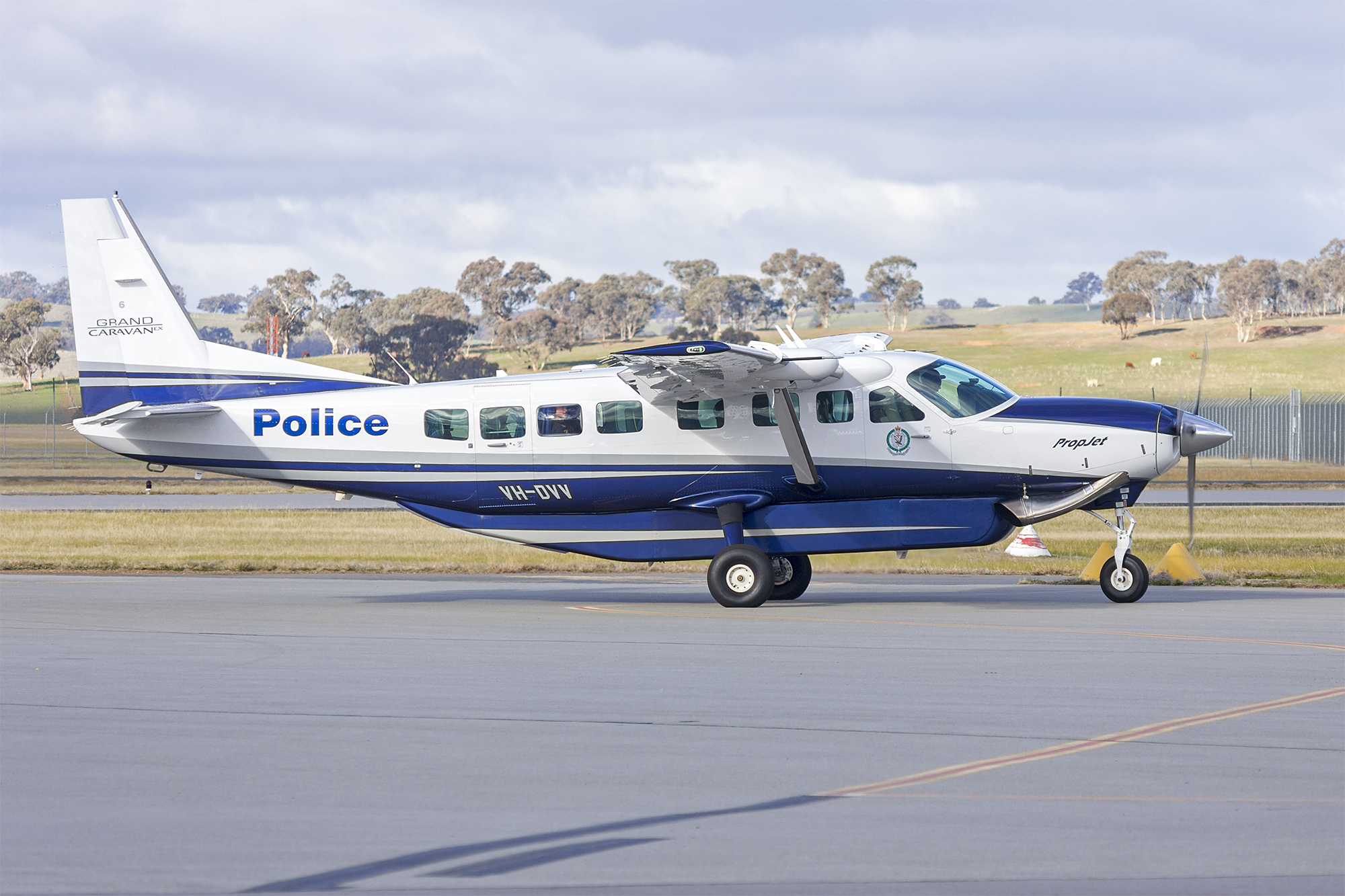
New South Wales Police Cessna 208 at Wagga Wagga Airport in 2017.

- New South Wales Police
- Queensland Police
- Western Australia Police

Bahamas

- Royal Bahamas Defence Force

Bahrain

- Royal Bahraini Air Force

Bangladesh

- Bangladesh Army

Belize

- Belize Defence Force Air Wing

Brazil

- Brazilian Air Force

Cameroon

- Cameroon Air Force

Chad

- Chadian Air Force

Chile

- Chilean Army
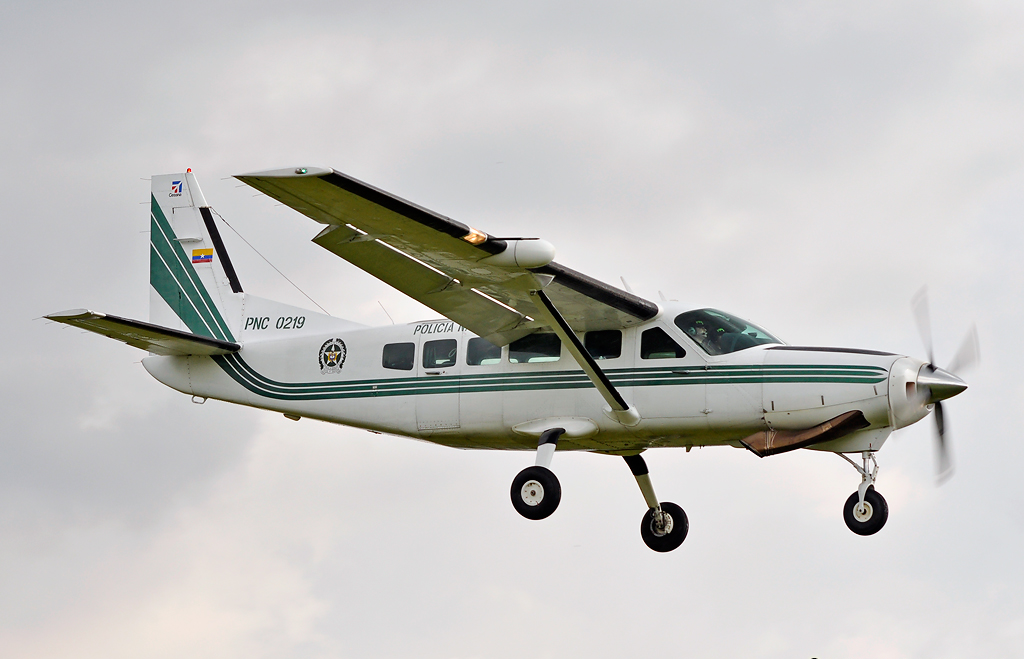
  A 208 from the National Police of Colombia

Colombia

- Colombian Aerospace Force
- Colombian Army
- Colombian Navy

Costa Rica

- Public Force of Costa Rica: Air Vigilance Service

Djibouti

- Djibouti Air Force

Dominican Republic

- Dominican Air Force

El Salvador

- Salvadoran Air Force

Guatemala

- Guatemalan Air Force

Honduras

- Honduran Air Force

Indonesia

- Mimika Regency Municipality

Iraq

- Iraqi Air Force
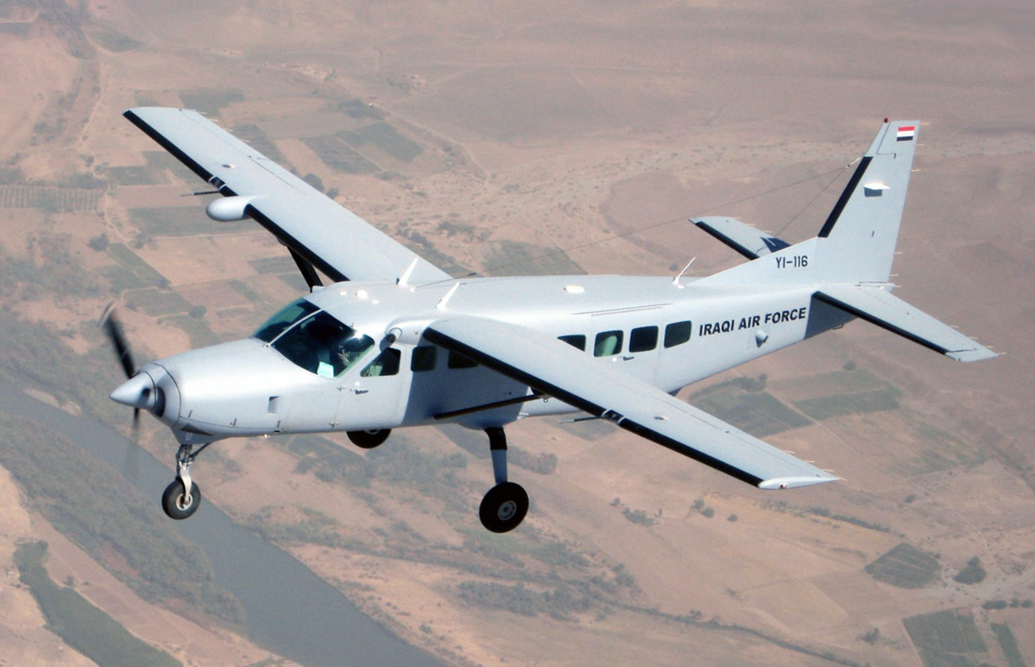
  An Iraqi Air Force Cessna 208B on a training sortie.

Jordan

- Royal Jordanian Air Force

Kenya

- Kenya Air Force

Lebanon

- Lebanese Air Force

Mali

- Malian Air Force

Mauritania

- Mauritania Air Force

Mongolia

- Mongolian Border Guard

Niger

- Niger Air Force

Pakistan

- Pakistan Army

Panama

- National Aeronaval Service
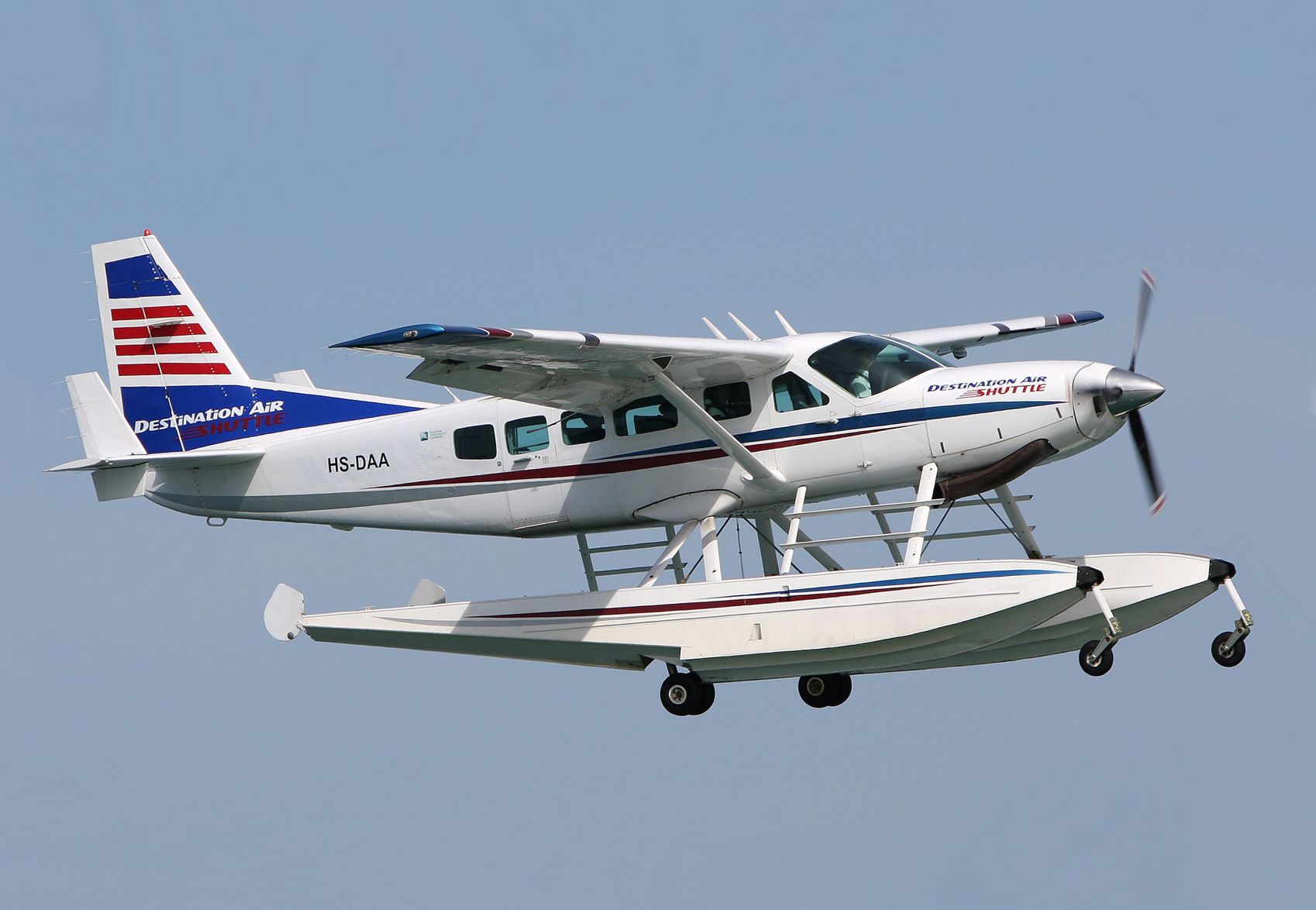
  An Air Shuttle Cessna 208 configured with floats

Paraguay

- Paraguayan Air Force

Peru

- Peruvian Army

Philippines

- Philippine Air Force – 2 units Cessna Grand Caravan ISTAR active out of 3 donated by Brand New by United States of America 1 Crash landed in Mactan–Benito Ebuen Air Base. – 1 C-208B Caravan Ex Utility funded through the Philippine General Appropriations Act of 2023 and acquired from Servo Aerotrade Services, Inc.

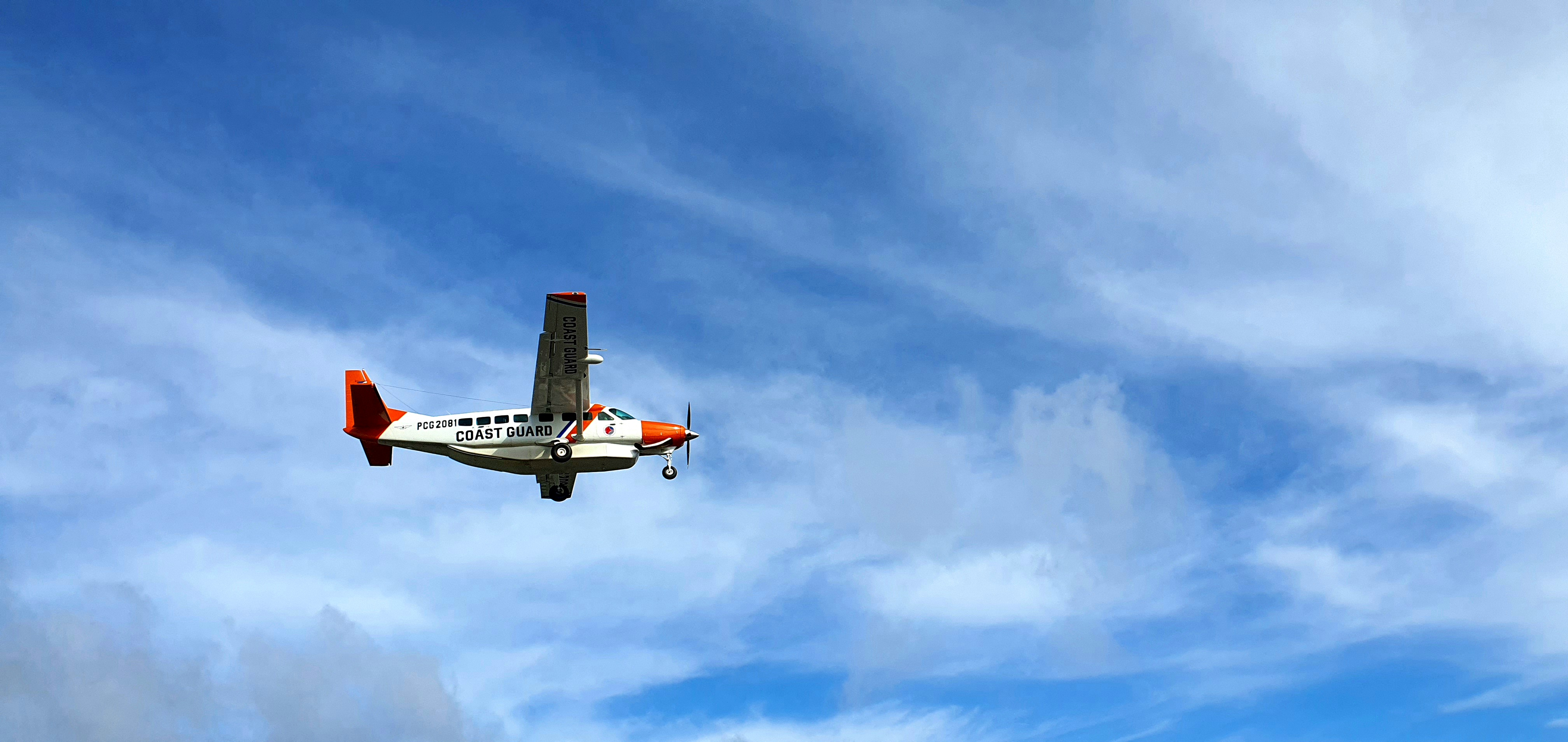
Philippine Coast Guard Cessna Grand Caravan 208

- Philippine Coast Guard 1 Unit.

Rwanda

- Rwandan Air Force

South Africa

- South African Air Force

Uganda

- Uganda Air Force

United Arab Emirates

- United Arab Emirates Air Force
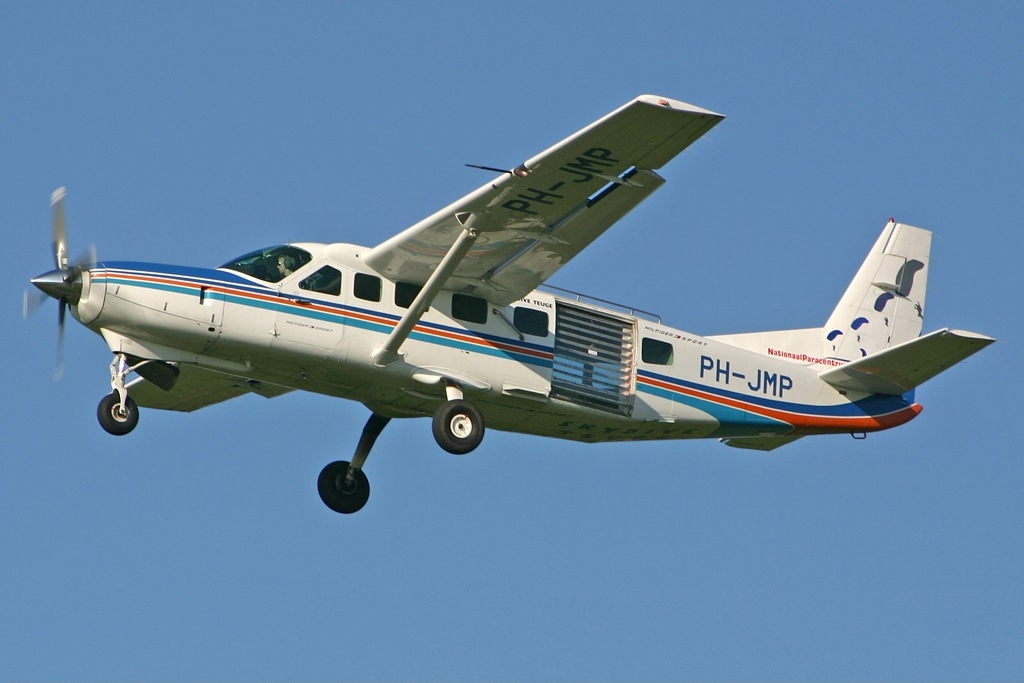
  The Cessna 208 is used as a skydiving platform

United States

- United States Army
- United States Marshals Service
- New York City Police Department

Venezuela

- Venezuelan Air Force
- Bolivarian Navy of Venezuela

Vietnam

- Survey and Aerial Mapping One Member Limited Liability Company (SAMCOM Co.Ltd), company affiliated to Vietnam Ministry of Defence

Zambia

- Zambian Air Force

=== Civilian ===
Australia

- Aviair
- Hinterland Aviation
- Skytrans Airlines
- Sydney Seaplanes

Belize

- Maya Island Air
- Tropic Air

Botswana

- Mack Air

Brazil

- Azul Conecta

Indonesia

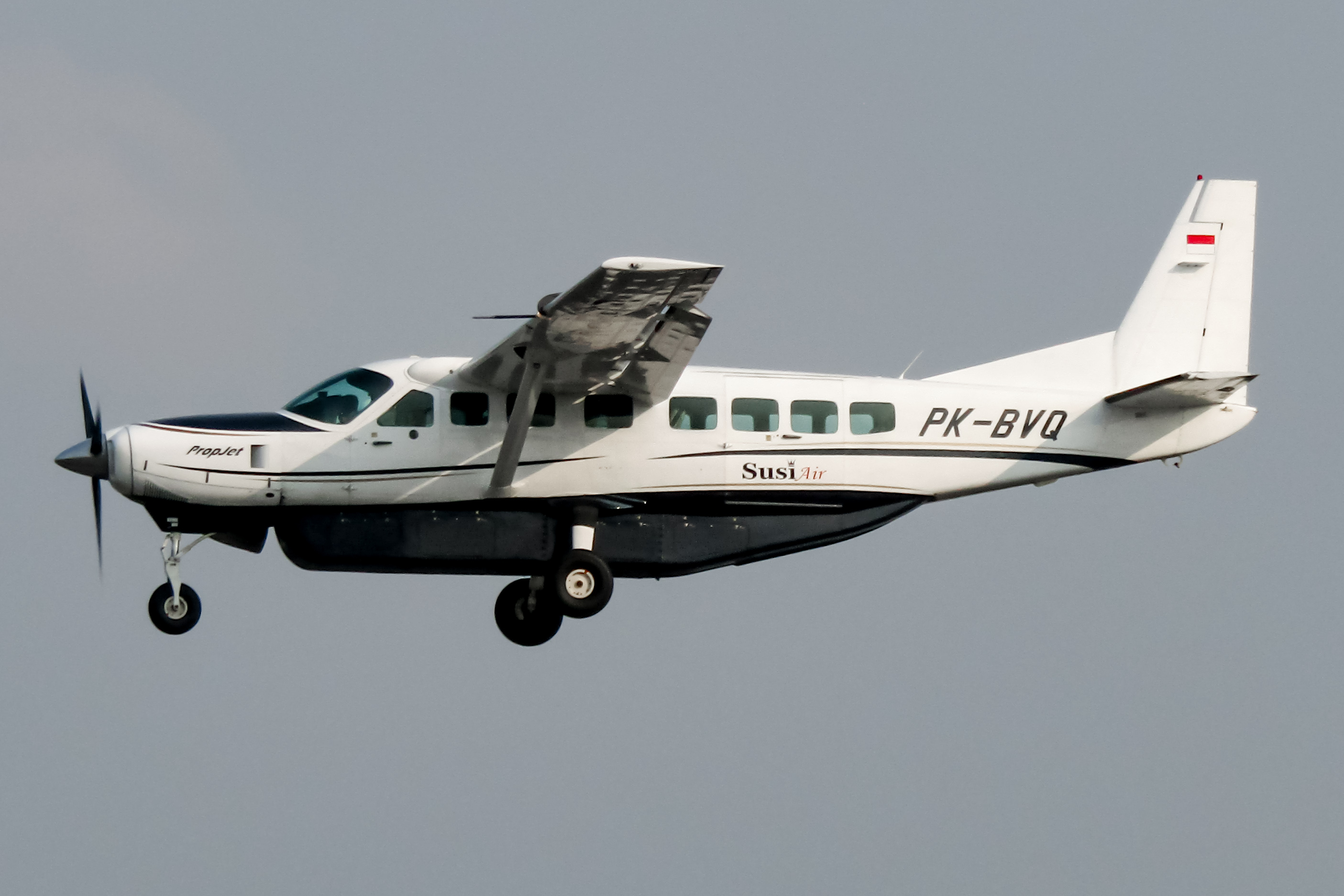
Susi Air on final approach

- Adventist Aviation Indonesia
- Asian One Air
- Dimonim Air
- Susi Air
- Yasa - SAM Air

New Zealand

- Barrier Air
- Glenorchy Air
- Sounds Air

Sri Lanka

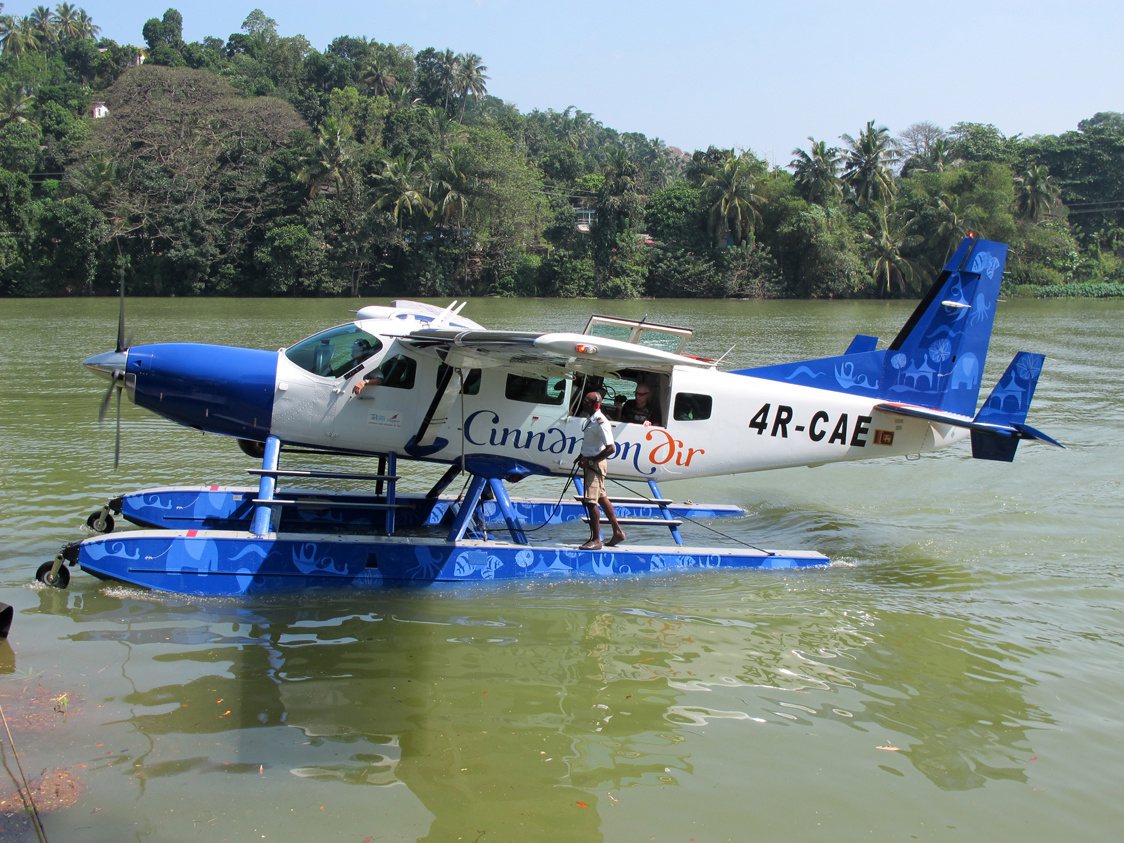
Cinnamon Air Cessna 208 Amphibian on Polgolla Barrage

- Cinnamon Air

Tanzania

- Coastal Aviation
- Auric Air
- Tropical Air
- ZanAir
- Flightlink

Uganda

- Aerolink Uganda
- Air Serv Limited

United States

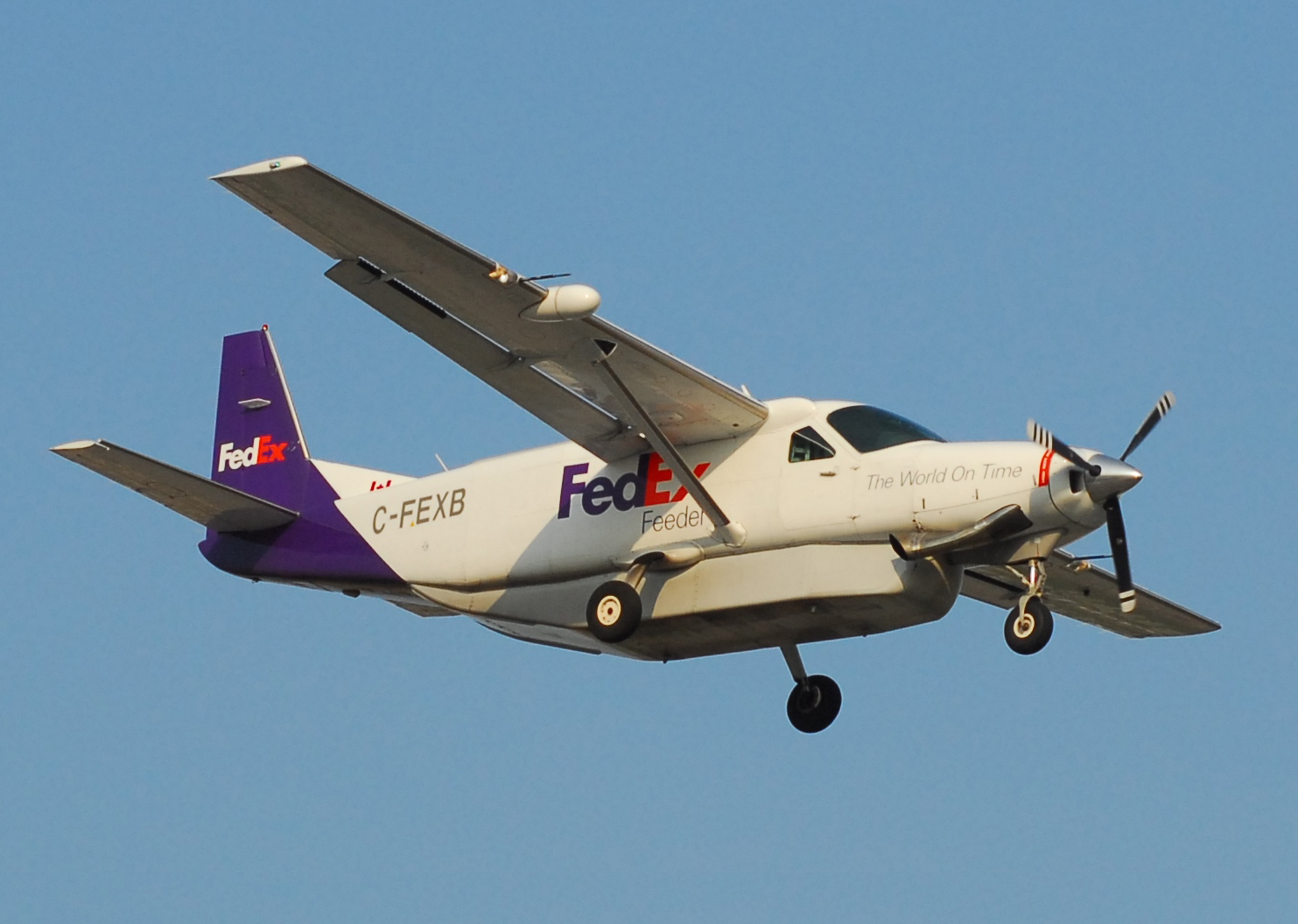
A FedEx Feeder on takeoff

- Everts Air
- FedEx Feeder
- Gem Air
- Grand Canyon Scenic Airlines
- Grant Aviation
- Kenmore Air
- Martinaire
- Mokulele Airlines
- Southern Airways Express
- Wright Air Service

International

- Mission Aviation Fellowship

== Former operators ==
Yemen

- Yemeni Air Force
