= Seronera Airstrip =

Airport in Serengeti National Park, Tanzania

Seronera Airstrip Uwanja mdogo wa Ndege wa Seronera
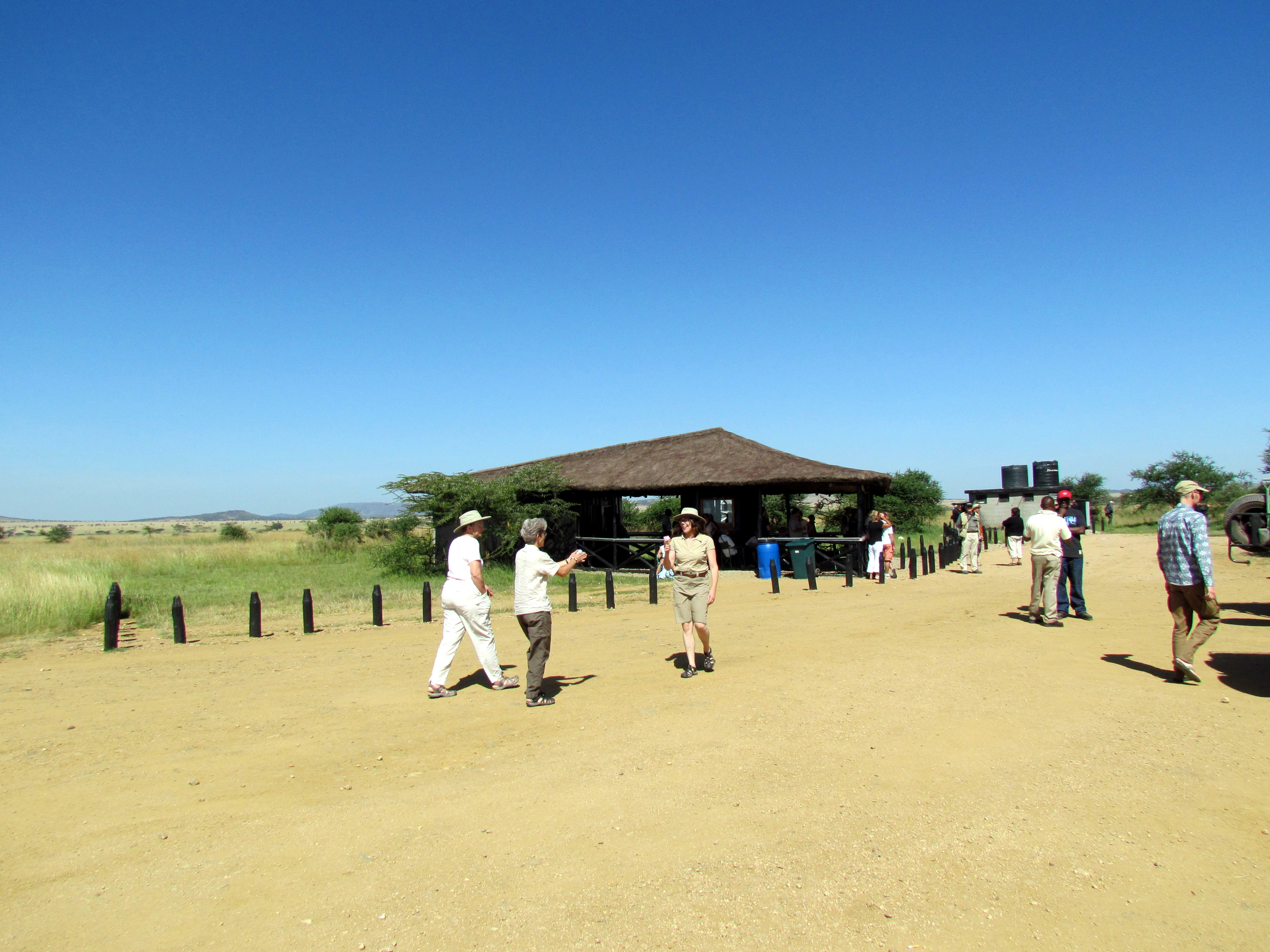
- IATA: SEU; ICAO: HTSN

Summary
- Airport type: Public
- Owner: Government of Tanzania
- Operator: TANAPA
- Serves: Seronera
- Location: Serengeti National Park, Tanzania
- Elevation AMSL: 5,080 ft / 1,548 m
- Coordinates: 2°27′25″S 34°49′17″E
- Website: Seronera Airport

Map
- Location of airstrip in Tanzania SEU (Africa)

Runways
Direction	Length		Surface
Direction	m	ft	Surface
13/31	2,280	7,480	Gravel
- Sources: GCM Google Maps TCAA

Seronera Airstrip (IATA: SEU, ICAO: HTSN) is the primary airstrip in the Serengeti National Park, in northern Tanzania.

== Airlines and destinations ==
Airlines	Destinations
Air Excel	Arusha, Manyara
As Salaam Air	Arusha, Dar es Salaam, Pemba, Zanzibar
Auric Air	Arusha, Entebbe, Grumeti, Klein's Camp, Kogatende, Lobo, Manyara, Sasakwa
Coastal Aviation	Arusha, Dar es Salaam, Entebbe, Fort Ikoma, Grumeti, Kilimanjaro, Kogatende, Lobo, Manyara, Mwanza, Ndutu, Pangani (Mashado), Ruaha, Sasakwa, Selous (Lower), Selous (Upper), Tarime, Zanzibar
Flightlink	Arusha, Dar es Salaam, Kilimanjaro, Zanzibar
Precision Air	Dar es Salaam, Zanzibar
Regional Air	Arusha, Dar es Salaam, Grumeti, Kilimanjaro, Kogatende, Lobo, Manyara, Sasakwa, Zanzibar
Safari Plus	Arusha, Zanzibar

== Gallery ==
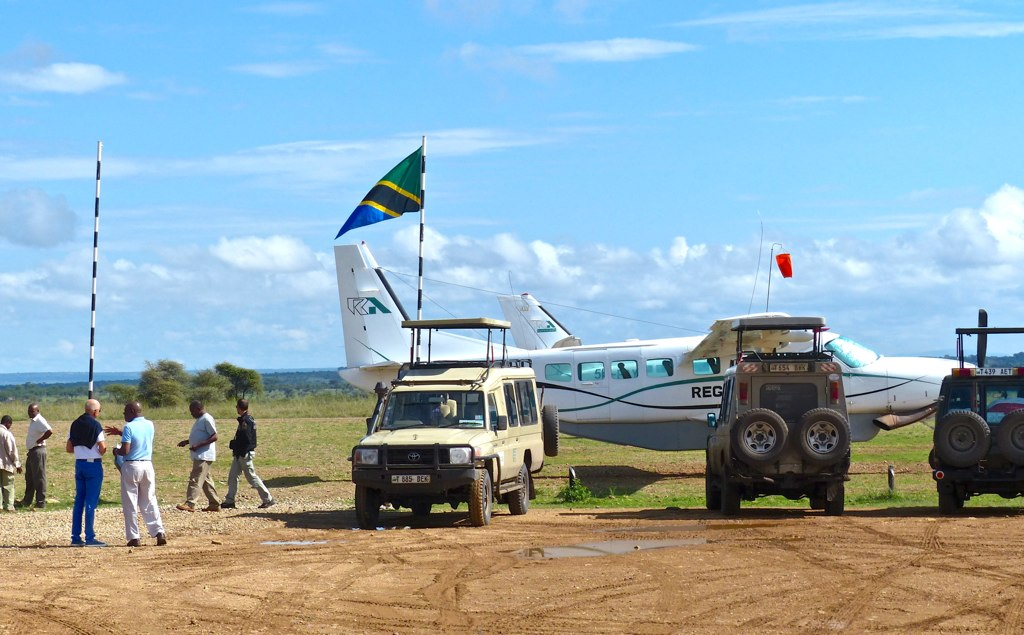
A parked aircraft.

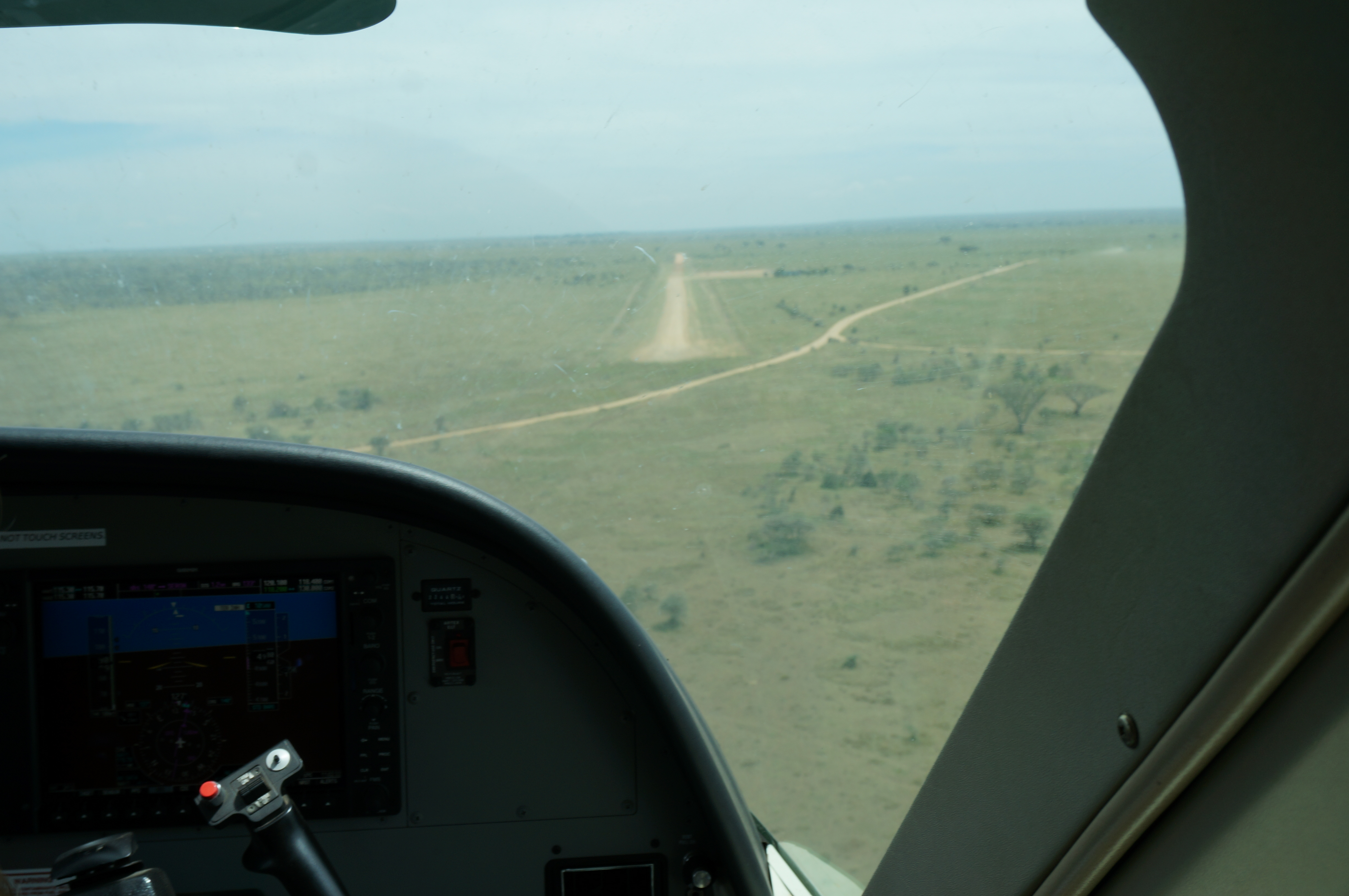
An aerial view of the runway.

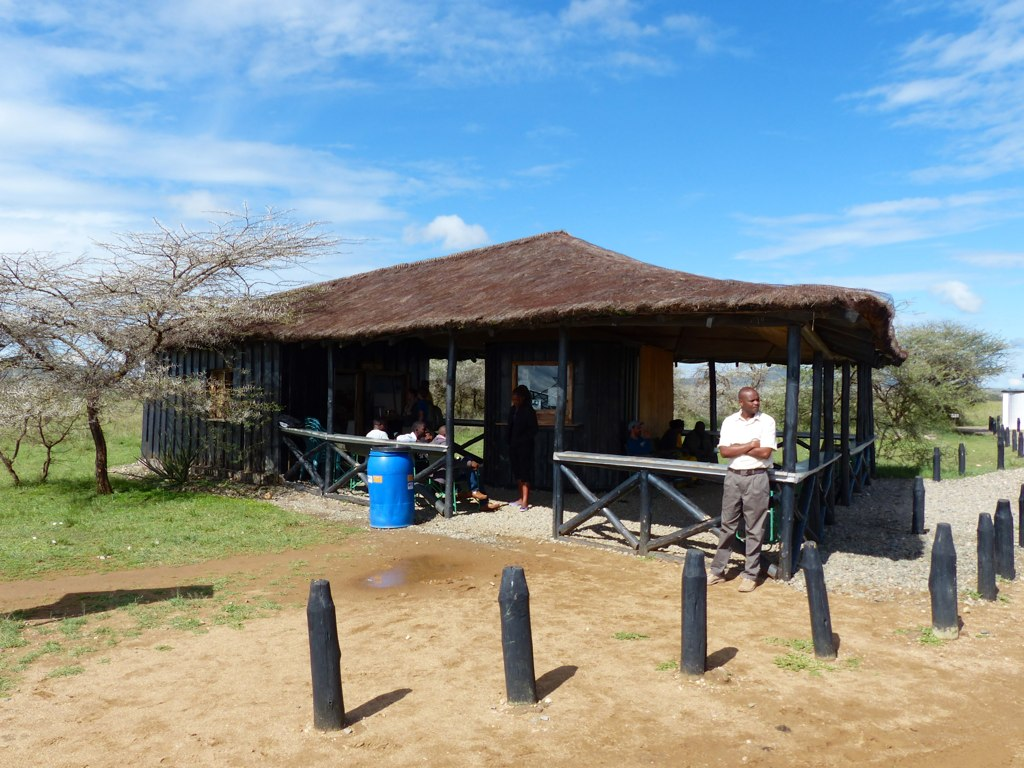
Terminal

== See also ==
- List of airports in Tanzania
- Transport in Tanzania
