= XLL (disambiguation) =

XLL is the XML Linking Language, or XLink, an XML markup language.

XLL or xll may also refer to:

- .xll, a filename extension for Microsoft Excel files
- Allentown Queen City Municipal Airport (FAA LID code: XLL), an airport in Pennsylvania, US
- Air Excel (ICAO code: XLL), an airline based in Arusha, Tanzania
