= FLZ =

FLZ or Flz can refer to:

- Ferdinand Lumban Tobing Airport, an airport in Sibolga, Indonesia, by IATA code
- Flightlink, a regional airline based in Tanzania, by ICAO code
- Flutter-tonguing, a musical technique often denoted by "Flz."
- WFLZ-FM, a radio station in Tampa, Florida, U.S. branded as "93.3 FLZ"
