= Air Excel =

Regional airline in Tanzania

IATA	ICAO	Call sign
—	XLL	TINGA-TINGA
- Founded: 1997
- Commenced operations: 1998
- AOC #: 28
- Hubs: Arusha Airport
- Fleet size: 9
- Destinations: 12
- Headquarters: Arusha, Tanzania
- Key people: Mike Kalaitzakis
- Website: www.airexcelonline.com

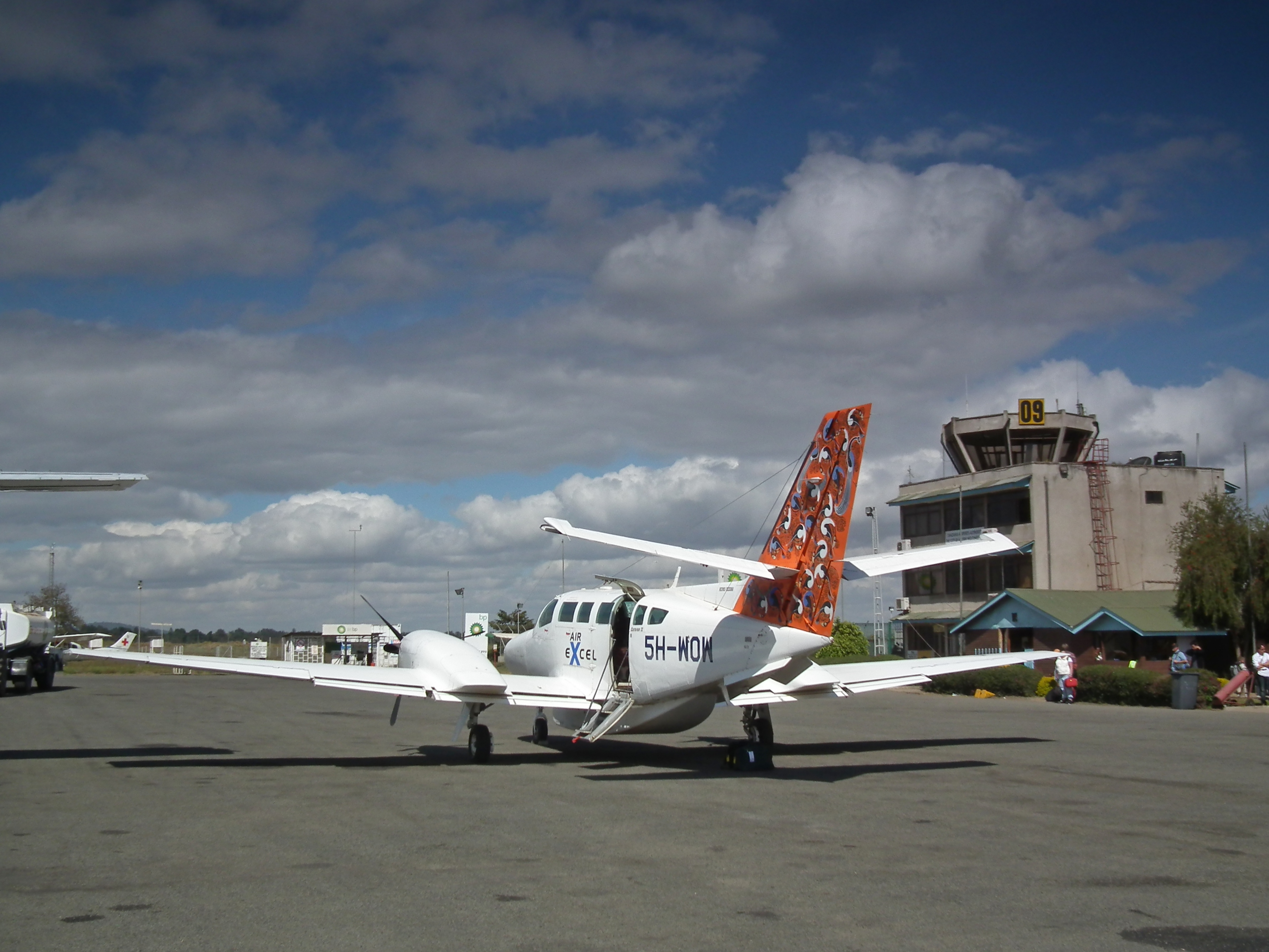
An Air Excel Reims-Cessna F406 Caravan II at Arusha Airport

Air Excel is an airline based in Arusha, Tanzania offering both scheduled and air charter services.

It is currently banned from flying into the EU.

== Destinations ==
Scheduled flights are operated to the following destinations:

Hub
Future
Terminated route

City	Country	Airport
Arusha	Tanzania	Arusha Airport
Lake Manyara National Park	Tanzania	Lake Manyara Airport
Seronera	Tanzania	Seronera Airstrip
Kilimanjaro	Tanzania	Kilimanjaro International Airport
Dar es Salaam	Tanzania	Julius Nyerere International Airport
Zanzibar	Tanzania	Abeid Amani Karume International Airport

== Fleet ==
The Air Excel fleet consists of the following aircraft:

Air Excel fleet
Aircraft	In service
Cessna 208B	8
Let L-410 Turbolet	1
Total	9
