= LKY (disambiguation) =

LKY usually refers to Lee Kuan Yew. It may also refer to:

- Loh Kean Yew
- Lake Manyara Airport (IATA code: LKY)
- LKY School
