= List of defunct airlines of Tanzania =

This is a list of defunct airlines of Tanzania.

Airline	Image	IATA	ICAO	Callsign	Commenced operations	Ceased operations	Notes
Aerovista Tanzania			VTZ		2012	2013	
Air Africa International					2011	2012	
Air Express Tanzania		ZG	AEJ	KHAKI EXPRESS	2002	2003	
Air Star Zanzibar			AZU		1993	1995	
Alliance Air		Y2	AFJ	JAMBO	1994	1999	Ran at a loss, last flight October 8, 2000. Joint venture between South African Airways, Tanzania and Uganda.
Community Airlines			CML		2007	2008	
Eagle Air		EY	EPL	FLYING EAGLE	1999	2002	
East African Airways		EC	EC	EastAf	1946	1977	Broke up to form Kenya Airways, Air Uganda and Air Tanzania
Fastjet Tanzania		FN	FTZ	GREYBIRD	2012	2018	
Fly Tanzania					2012	????	
Fly540 Tanzania			FTZ	SWIFT TANGO	2011	2012	Rebranded as Fastjet Tanzania
Indigo Aviation					2009	2010	
Jetlink Express			JLT	-	2011	2011	Failed Project
Karibu Airways			KRB		2005	2006	
New ACS Tanzania		DF	NWC		1993	1997	
Precision Air Services		PW	PRF		1991	1997	renamed/merged to Precision Air
Zara Airways			AZD	Air Zara International	2008	2011	

== See also ==
- List of airlines of Tanzania
- List of airports in Tanzania
