= Auric Air =

Tanzanian airline

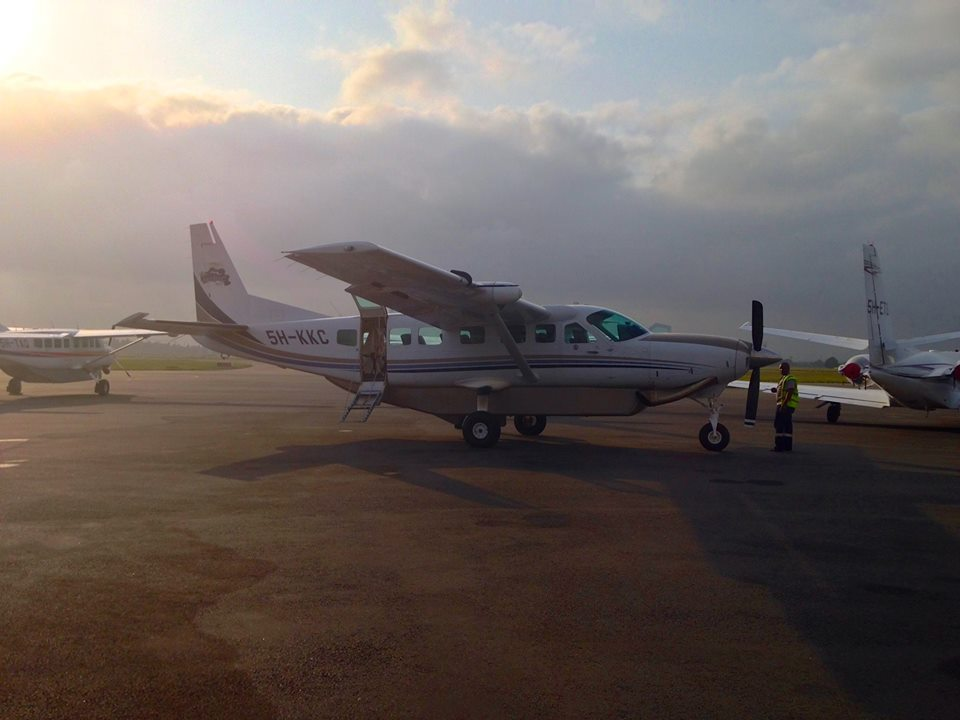
- Auric Air 5H-KKC at JNIA.
IATA	ICAO	Call sign
UI	AUK	AURIC SERVICES
- Founded: 2001
- Commenced operations: 2001
- AOC #: 22
- Operating bases: 3
- Hubs: Mwanza Airport
- Secondary hubs: JNIA; Arusha Airport
- Fleet size: 19
- Destinations: 42+
- Headquarters: Mwanza, Tanzania
- Key people: Nurmohamed Hussein (Managing Director)
- Website: www.auricair.com

Auric Air Services Limited is a small privately owned airline based in Tanzania, operating from Mwalimu Julius Nyerere International Airport (JNIA) Dar-es-salaam, Arusha Airport and Mwanza Airport. The company offers scheduled flights to 42 destinations within East Africa as well as on demand private non-scheduled air charter.

It is currently on the List of airlines banned in the European Union.

== Destinations ==
Scheduled flights are operated to the following destinations:

Hub
Future
On inducement basis

City	Country	IATA	ICAO	Airport	Refs
Arusha	Tanzania	ARK	HTAR	Arusha Airport	
Chem Chem	Tanzania			Chem Chem Airstrip	
Dar es Salaam	Tanzania	DAR	HTDA	Julius Nyerere International Airport	
Entebbe	Uganda	EBB	HUEN	Entebbe International Airport	
Ifakara	Tanzania			Ifakara Airstrip	
Iringa	Tanzania	IRI	HTIR	Iringa Airport	
Kigali	Rwanda	KGL	HRYR	Kigali International Airport	
Kilimanjaro International Airport	Tanzania	JRO	HTKJ	Kilimanjaro International Airport	
Lake Manyara	Tanzania	LKY	HTLM	Lake Manyara Airport	
Mafia Island	Tanzania	MFA	HTMA	Mafia Airport	
Migori	Kenya		HKMN	Migori Airport	
Moshi	Tanzania	QSI	HTMS	Moshi Airport	
Mwanza	Tanzania	MWZ	HTMW	Mwanza Airport	
Pangani	Tanzania			Kwajoni Airstrip	
Pemba Island	Tanzania	PMA	HTPE	Pemba Airport	
Ruaha National Park	Tanzania			Msembe Airstrip	
Saadani National Park	Tanzania			Saadani Airstrip	
Selous Game Reserve	Tanzania			Beho Beho Airstrip	
Selous Game Reserve	Tanzania			Kiba Airstrip	
Selous Game Reserve	Tanzania			Matambwe Airstrip	
Selous Game Reserve	Tanzania			Mbuyu Airstrip	
Selous Game Reserve	Tanzania			Mtemere Airstrip	
Selous Game Reserve	Tanzania			Siwandu Airstrip	
Selous Game Reserve	Tanzania			Stiegler's Airstrip	
Serengeti National Park	Tanzania			Fort Ikoma Airstrip	
Serengeti National Park	Tanzania			Grumeti Airstrip	
Serengeti National Park	Tanzania			Kogatende Airstrip	
Serengeti National Park	Tanzania			Lamai Airstrip	
Serengeti National Park	Tanzania			Lobo Airstrip	
Serengeti National Park	Tanzania			Mwiba Airstrip	
Serengeti National Park	Tanzania			Ndutu Airstrip	
Serengeti National Park	Tanzania			Sasakwa Airstrip	
Serengeti National Park	Tanzania	SEU	HTSN	Seronera Airstrip	
Serengeti National Park	Tanzania			Kusini Airstrip	
Rubondo Island	Tanzania			Rubondo Airstrip	
Tanga	Tanzania	TGT	HTTG	Tanga Airport	
Tarime	Tanzania			Tarime Airstrip	
Usa River	Tanzania			Dolly Airstrip	
Zanzibar	Tanzania	ZNZ	HTZA	Abeid Amani Karume International Airport	

== Fleet ==
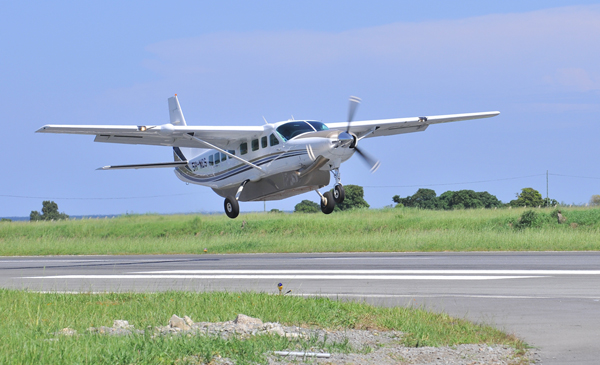
Auric Air Cessna 208

Auric Air DHC-8-100

Auric Air fleet consists of the following nineteen aircraft (as of August 2024):

Auric Air fleet
Aircraft	In fleet	Passengers				Notes
Aircraft	In fleet	C	P	Y	Total	Notes
Cessna 208B	4	–	–	12	12	
Cessna 208B-EX	13	–	–	12	12	
De Havilland Canada DHC-8-Q100	1	—	—			(as of August 2025)
De Havilland Canada DHC-8-Q200	1	—	—			(as of August 2025)
Pilatus PC-12	1	–	–	8	8	
Total	20					

== Accidents and incidents ==
- On 23 September 2019, a Cessna 208 Grand Caravan, registration number 5H-AAM, was damaged beyond repair when it crashed shortly after takeoff from Seronera Airstrip, under unclear circumstances. The pilot, Nelson Mabeyo, and the other passenger who was a student pilot both died in the crash.
