= Regional Air =

Tanzanian airline

Regional Air Services
| IATA | ICAO | Call sign |
|---|---|---|
| 8N | REG | REGIONAL SERVICES |
- Founded: 1997
- AOC #: 25
- Hubs: Arusha Airport
- Fleet size: 5
- Destinations: 13 (scheduled)
- Parent company: Airkenya Aviation
- Headquarters: Arusha, Tanzania
- Website: www.regionaltanzania.com

Regional Air Services is an airline based in Arusha, Tanzania. It is the Tanzanian division of Airkenya and operates domestic services and charter flights in East and Southern Africa.

It is banned from flying into the European Union.

== History ==
The airline was established in 1997 and started operations in July 1997. It is wholly owned by Airkenya Aviation.

== Destinations ==
Scheduled services are operated to the following cities:

- Arusha
- Dar es Salaam
- Fort Ikoma
- Grumeti
- Kilimanjaro
- Kogatende
- Lake Manyara
- Lobo
- Ndutu
- Sasakwa
- Seronera
- Tarime
- Zanzibar

Charter flights are also operated throughout Tanzania.

== Fleet ==
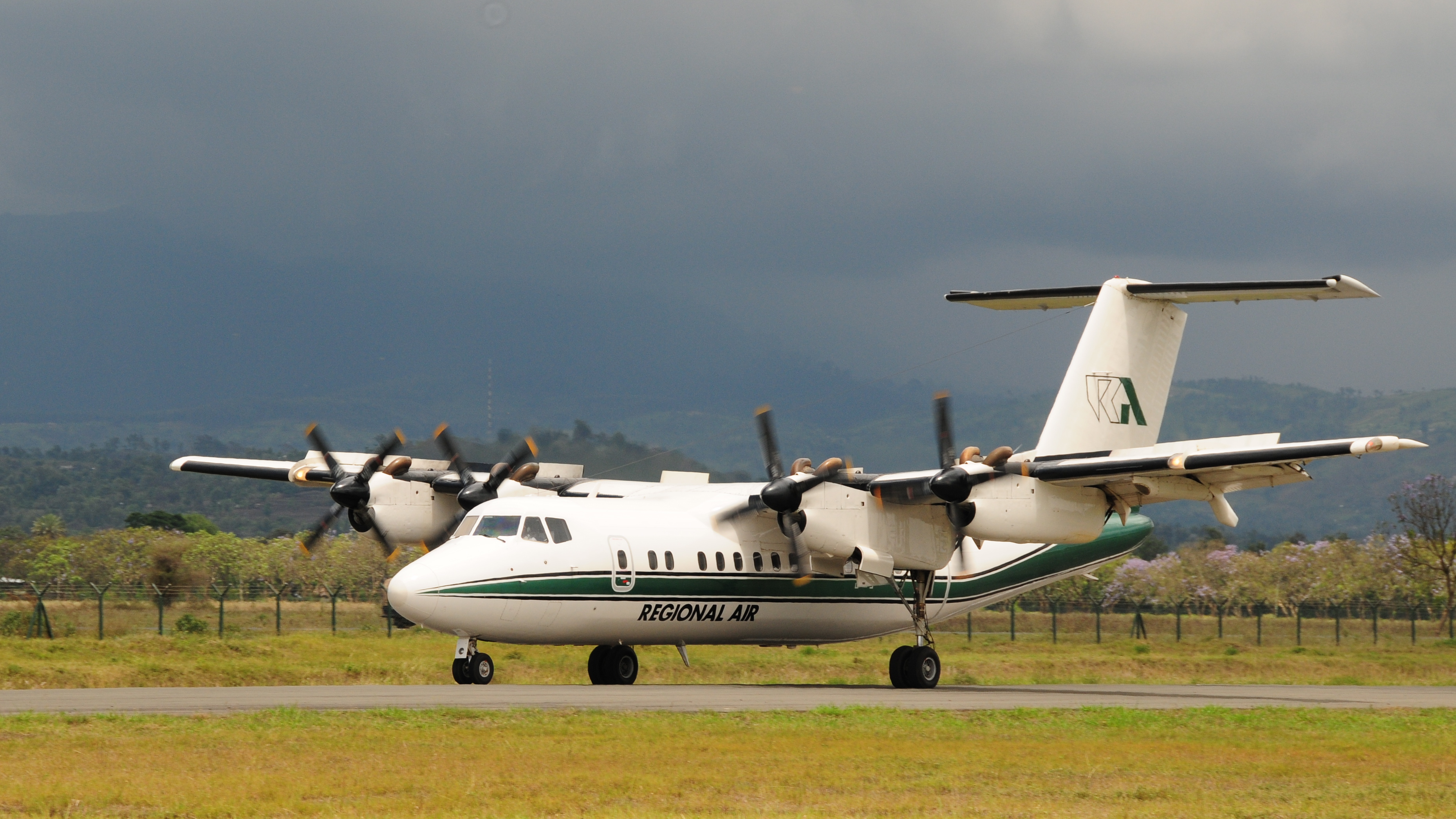
Regional Air DHC-7 at Arusha Airport

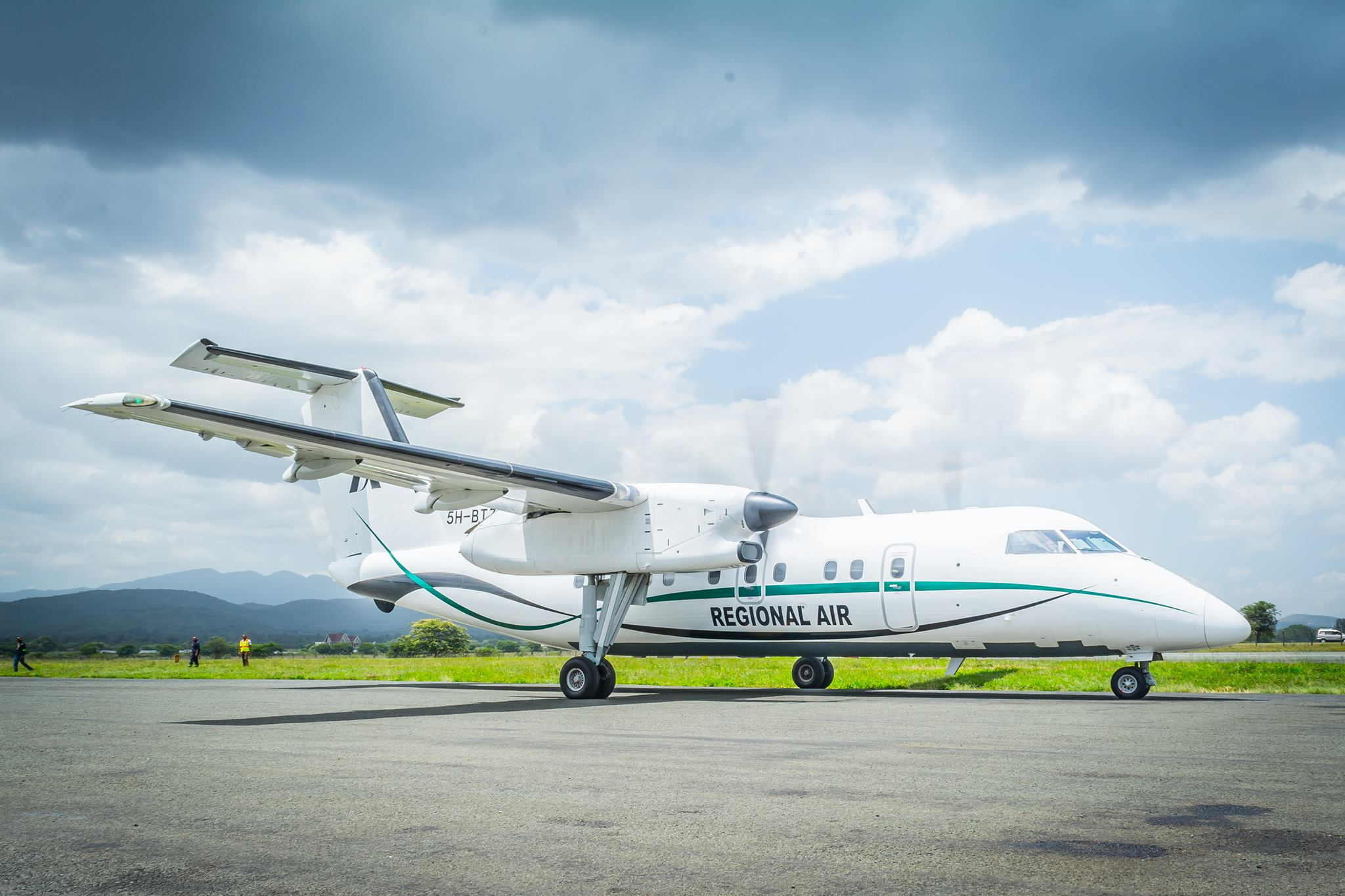
Regional Air DHC-8 at Arusha Airport

The Regional Air Services (Tanzania) fleet comprises the following aircraft (as of November 2018):

Regional Air Services cleet
| Aircraft | In fleet | Orders | Passengers | Notes |
|---|---|---|---|---|
| Cessna 208 Caravan | 2 | — | 13 | |
| De Havilland Canada DHC-6-300 Twin Otter | 1 | — | 18 | (as of August 2025) |
| Reims-Cessna F406 Caravan II | 1 | — | 11 | |
| De Havilland Canada DHC-8-100 | 1 | — | 37 | (as of August 2025) |
| Total | 5 | | | |
