= Arusha Airport =

Airport located in Arusha Region, Tanzania

Arusha Airport Uwanja wa Ndege wa Arusha (Swahili)
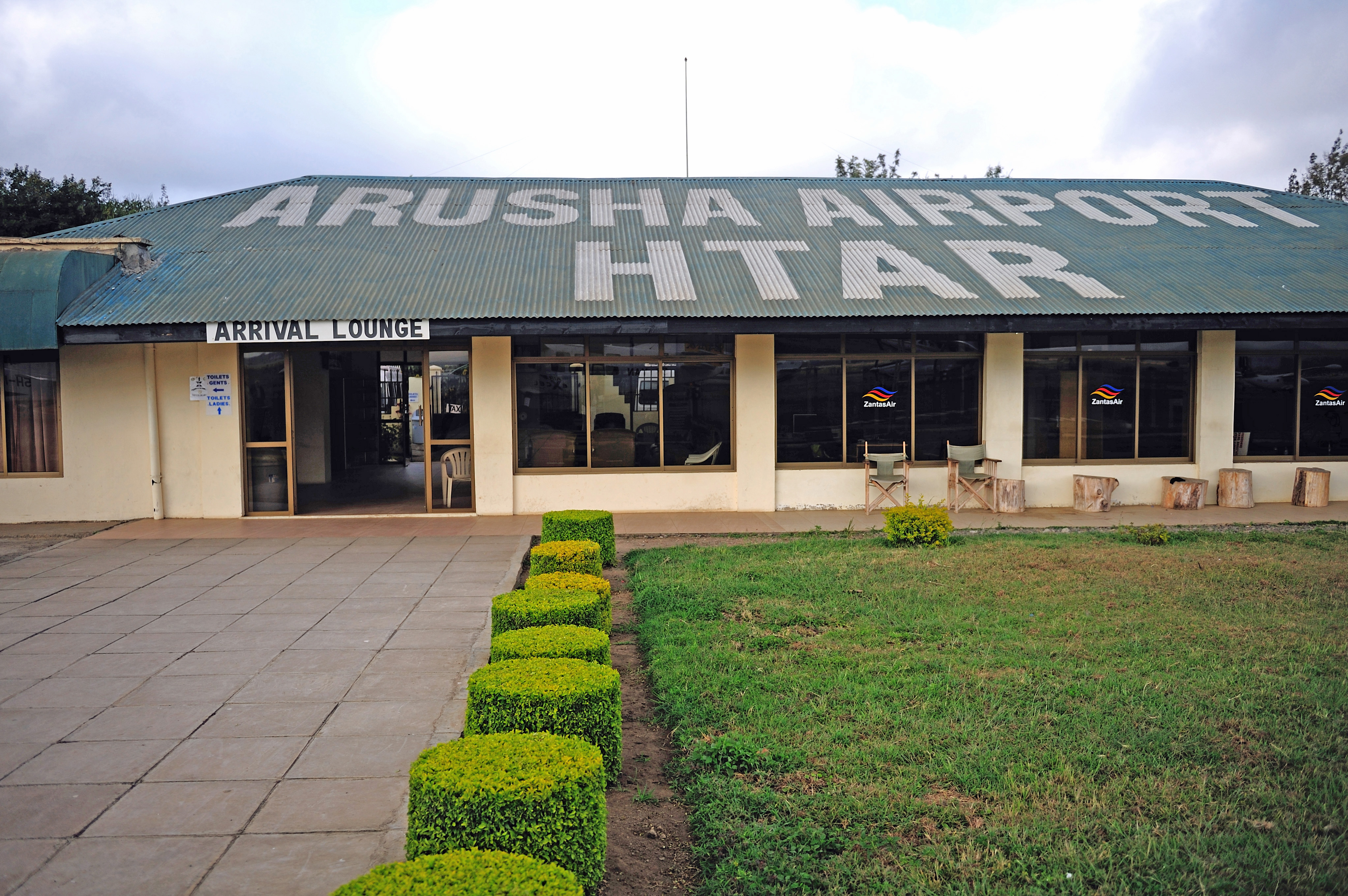
- IATA: ARK; ICAO: HTAR; WMO: 63789

Summary
- Airport type: Public
- Owner: Government of Tanzania
- Operator: Tanzania Airports Authority
- Location: Arusha Region, Tanzania
- Hub for: Air Excel; Regional Air
- Built: 1953
- Elevation AMSL: 4,550 ft / 1,387 m
- Coordinates: 3°22′00″S 36°37′19″E
- Website: www.taa.go.tz

Map
- Location of airport in Tanzania

Runways
Direction	Length		Surface
Direction	m	ft	Surface
09/27	1,860	6,102	Asphalt

Statistics (2024)
- Passengers: 404,626
- Aircraft movements: 27,050
- Cargo (tonnes): 1,013
- Sources: TAA, TCAA GCM Google Maps

Arusha Airport (IATA: ARK, ICAO: HTAR) (Uwanja wa ndege wa Arusha in Swahili) is a domestic airport located in Olasiti ward of the city of Arusha, the capital of the Arusha Region of Tanzania. The airport is currently undergoing an expansion, which includes a new apron and terminal building.

The Arusha non-directional beacon (Ident: AR) is located at the west end of the field.

== History ==
Arusha Airport was constructed in 1953 by Colonel Grey, who was a prominent coffee and sorghum farmer in Mateves. The airport was officially transferred to the government after Tanganyika gained independence in 1961.

Initially managed by East African Airways, the airport came under the oversight of the agricultural ministry known as Kilimo Hanger following the dissolution of the East African Community in 1977. In 1999, the Tanzania Airports Authority was established as an executive agency with the responsibility of operating and managing all government airports and airstrips across Tanzania mainland.

== Airlines and destinations ==
Arusha airport is served by seven airlines at the moment. Table below as follows:

Airlines	Destinations
Air Tanzania	Zanzibar
As Salaam Air	Dar es Salaam, Seronera, Zanzibar
Coastal Aviation	Dar es Salaam, Kilimanjaro, Mafia Island, Manyara, Mikumi, Mwanza, Pemba Island, Ruaha, Selous, Serengeti, Tanga, Tarangire, Zanzibar
Precision Air	Dar es Salaam, Zanzibar
Regional Air	Kilimanjaro, Manyara, Zanzibar
Tropical Air	Dar es Salaam, Zanzibar
ZanAir	Dar es Salaam, Mombasa, Pemba Island, Zanzibar

== Statistics ==
Year	Passengers		Aircraft movements		Cargo (kg)	
2010	154,174	▲20.5%	19,460	▲15.5%	812,930	▲6.69%
2011	112,433	▼-37.1%	21,306	▲8.66%	41,238	▼-1871%
2012	162,268	▲30.7%	22,690	▲6.10%	192,725	▲78.6%
2013	187,911	▲13.7%	23,868	▲4.94%	212,760	▲9.42%
2014	179,511	▼-4.68%	23,904	▲0.15%	148,390	▼-43.4%
2015	142,224	▼-26.2%	20,692	▼-15.5%	141,061	▼-5.20%
Source: Tanzania Airports Authority

== Accidents and incidents ==
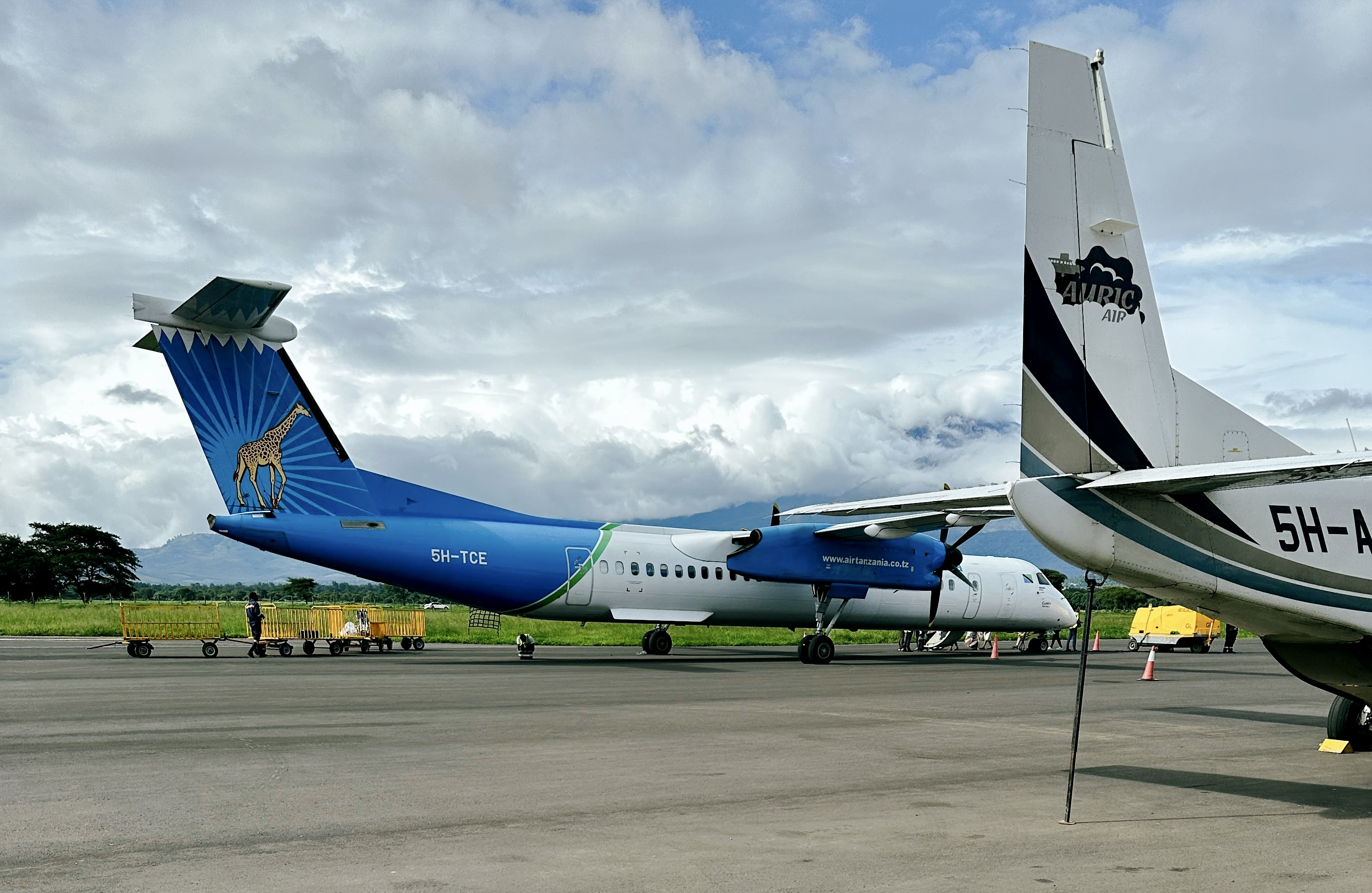
Air Tanzania at Arusha Airport

- On 18 December 2013, an Ethiopian Airlines Boeing 767 (ET-AQW) flight from Addis Ababa to Kilimanjaro International Airport made an unscheduled landing at the airport after it failed to land at its destination. The runway is shorter than the 767 is normally able to operate from. Consequently, it overran the end of the runway which resulted in the airport being closed for a short time. A few days later it was flown empty to Kilimanjaro International Airport.

== See also ==
- List of airports in Tanzania
- Transport in Tanzania
