= Seronera =

Settlement in Serengeti National Park, Tanzania

Coordinates: 2°26′10″S 34°49′16″E

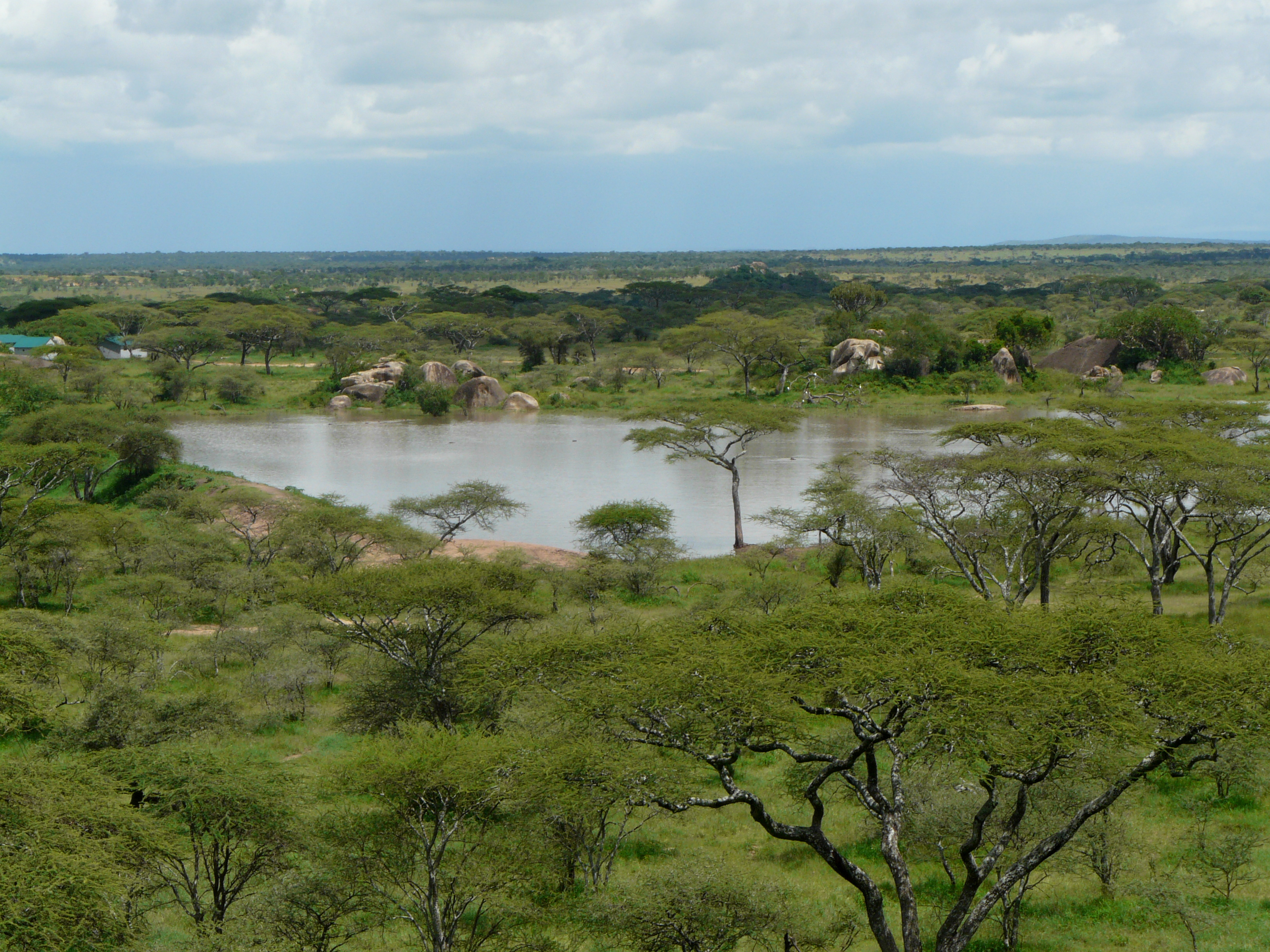
Seronera, Tanzania

Seronera is a small settlement in Serengeti National Park, Tanzania. The oldest lodge in the national park is located in Seronera. It is home to a small airstrip.
