= Abeid Amani Karume International Airport =

Main airport in the Zanzibar Archipelago, Tanzania

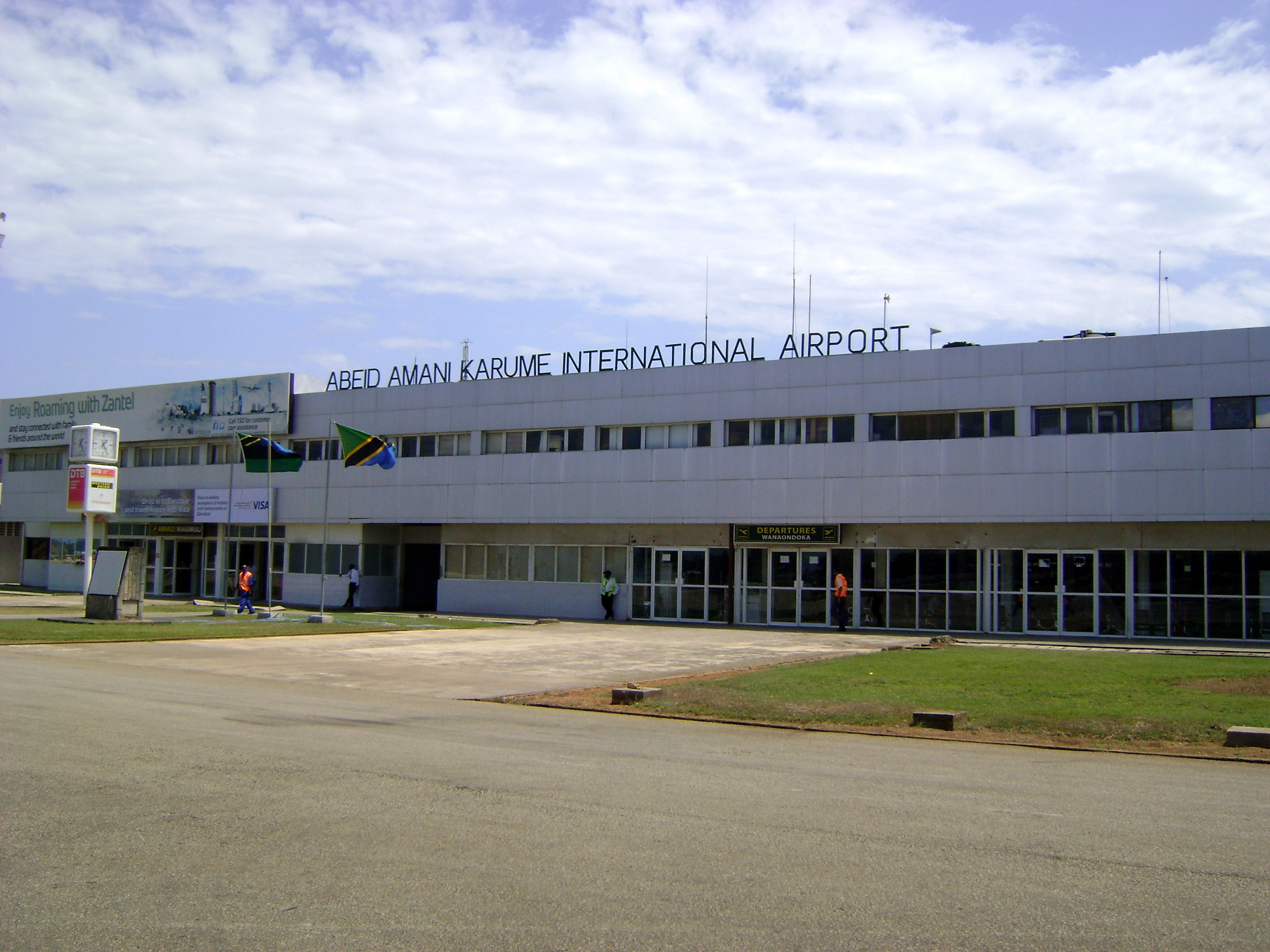
- IATA: ZNZ; ICAO: HTZA; WMO: 63870

Summary
- Airport type: Public
- Owner: Government of Zanzibar
- Operator: Zanzibar Airports Authority
- Serves: Zanzibar City
- Location: Unguja Island, Zanzibar, Tanzania
- Hub for: ZanAir
- Elevation AMSL: 54 ft (16 m)
- Coordinates: 6°13′20″S 39°13′30″E
- Website: www.taa.go.tz

Map
- Location within Tanzania Location within Africa

Runways
Direction	Length		Surface
Direction	m	ft	Surface
18/36	3,007	9,865	Asphalt

Statistics (2025)
- Passengers: ▲2,694,149
- Aircraft movements: ▲67,735
- Cargo (Metric tonnes): ▲5,423
- Source: TAA GCM

Abeid Amani Karume International Airport (Swahili: Uwanja wa Ndege wa Kimataifa wa Abeid Amani Karume, IATA: ZNZ, ICAO: HTZA) is the main airport in the Zanzibar Archipelago located on Unguja Island, Zanzibar, Tanzania. It is approximately 5 kilometres (3.1 mi) south of Zanzibar City, the capital of Zanzibar, and has flights to East Africa, Europe, and the Middle East. It was previously known as Kisauni Airport and Zanzibar International Airport. It was renamed in 2010 in honour of Abeid Amani Karume (1905–1972), the island's first president.

== Terminals ==
Terminal 1 is an inactive terminal that was used during the British protectorate of Zanzibar. This is a small building found on the northern side of terminal 2 and currently used as the airport office.

Terminal 2 is active for all landing aircraft. A new shelter on the entrance of the airport has been put in place.

Construction of the third terminal started in January 2011 by the Chinese Beijing Construction Engineering Group. A new apron of 100,000 square metres (1,100,000 ft^{2}) will replace the existing 21,000 square metres (230,000 ft^{2}). The project is estimated to cost about US$70.4 million. On completion, it will have the capacity to serve up to 1.5 million passengers per year. The new terminal was expected to be operational in 2014, but construction work was delayed due to financial and technical reasons. The new terminal was inaugurated in September 2020 and started operation in early 2021. Terminal 3 serves international flights while Terminal 2 serves both domestic and some international flights.

== Airlines and destinations ==
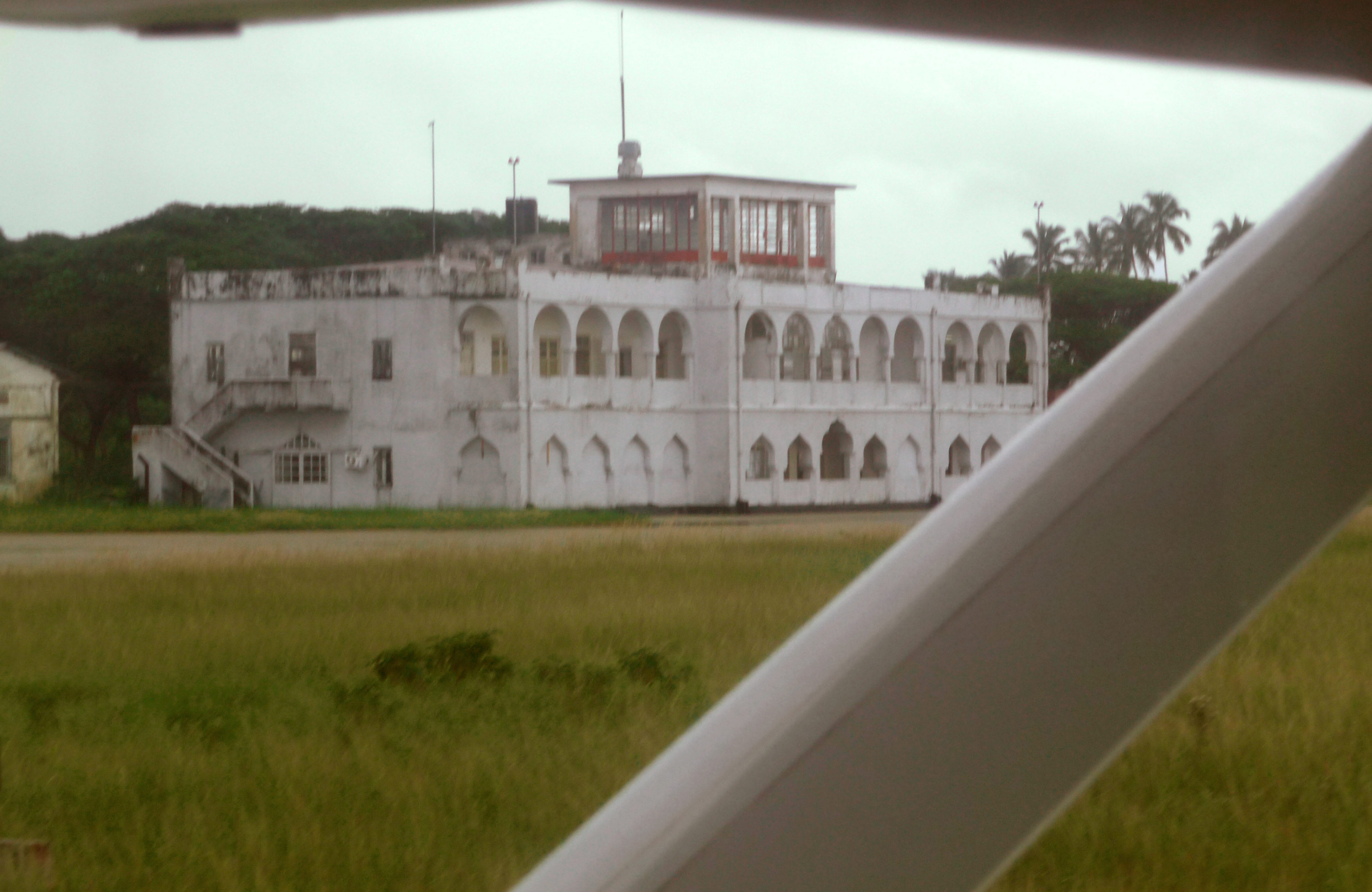
The old terminal building

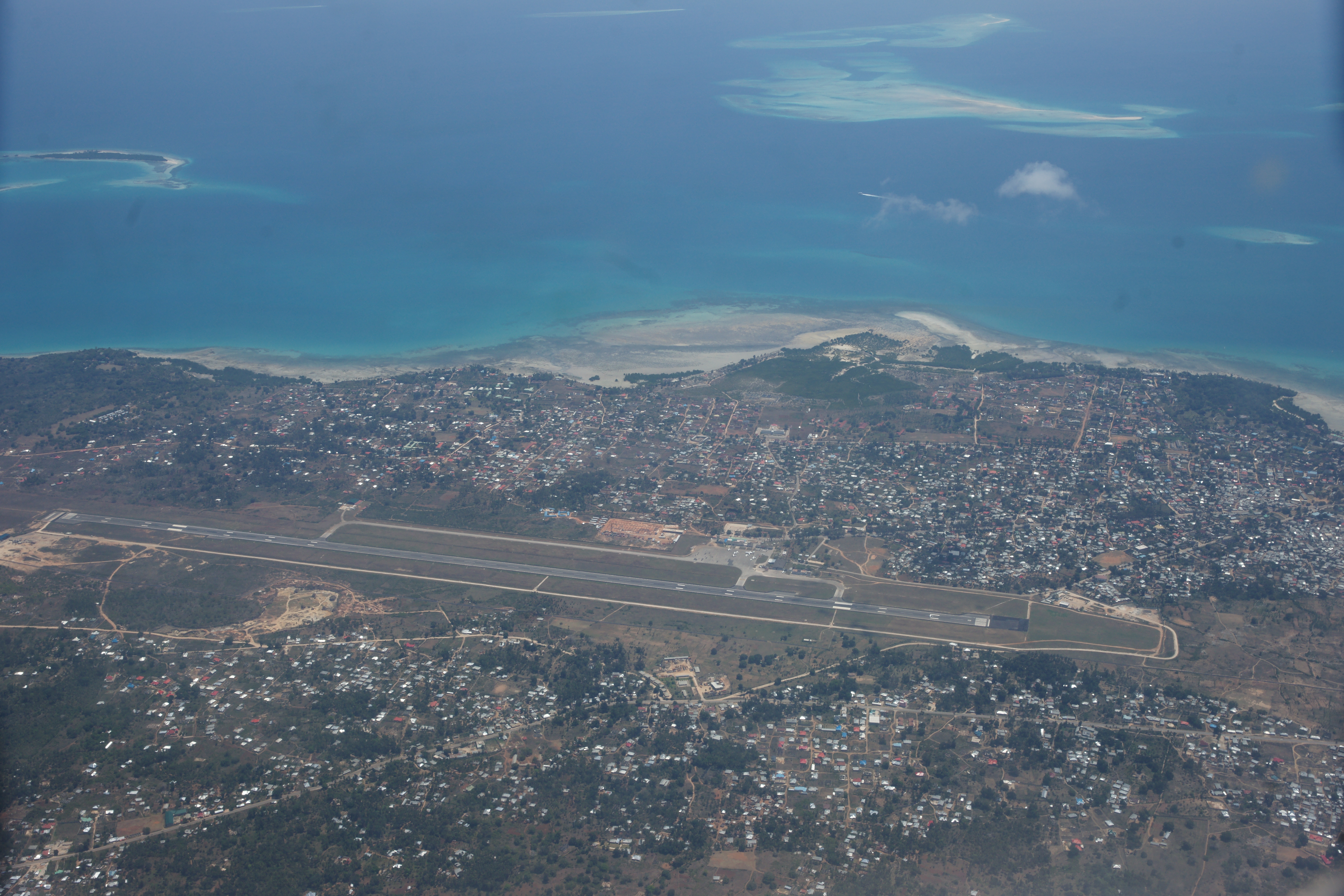
Aerial view of Abeid Amani Karume International Airport

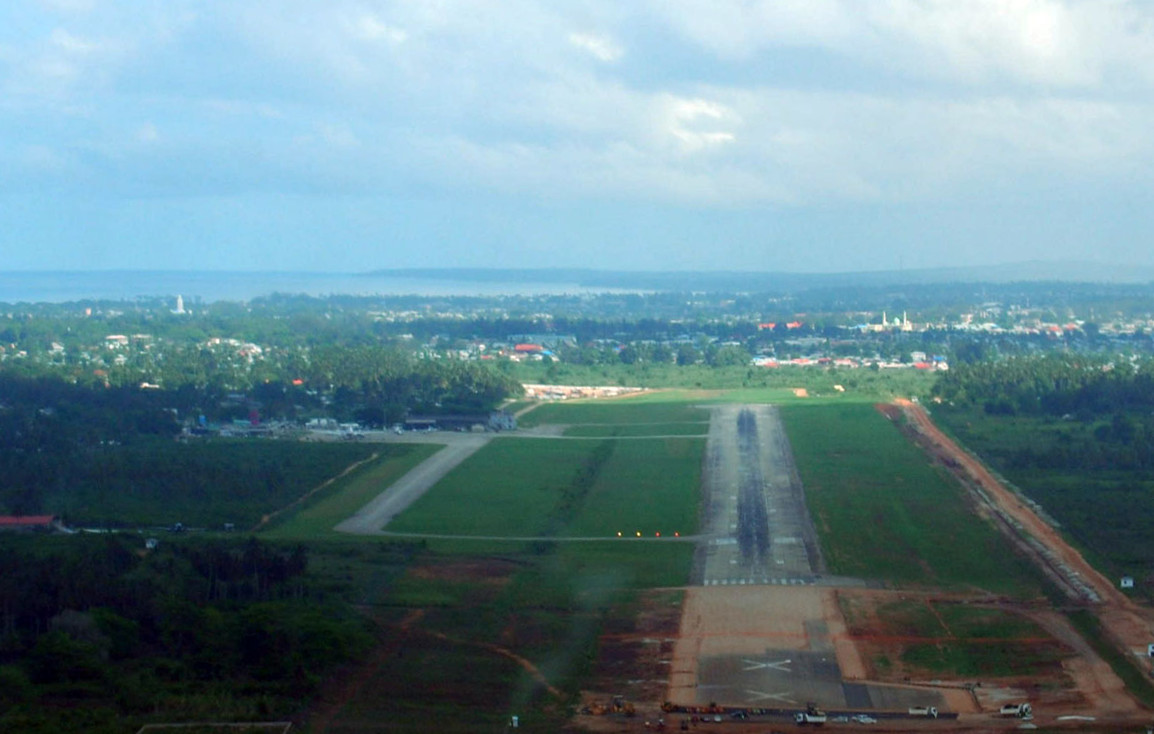
On approach to the airport

=== Passenger ===
The following airlines operate regular scheduled and charter flights at Zanzibar Airport:

Airlines	Destinations
Air France	Paris–Charles de Gaulle
Airlink	Cape Town, Johannesburg–O. R. Tambo
Air Tanzania	Arusha, Dar es Salaam, Dubai–International, Kilimanjaro, London–Gatwick (begins 1 July 2027), Moscow-Vnukovo, Nairobi–Jomo Kenyatta, Pemba Island
Arkia	Seasonal: Tel Aviv
As Salaam Air	Arusha, Dar es Salaam, Pemba Island, Tanga
Auric Air	Arusha, Dar es Salaam, Entebbe, Iringa, Kigali, Kilimanjaro, Maasai Mara, Mafia Island, Mikumi, Pangani, Pemba Island, Ruaha, Saadani, Selous, Serengeti, Songea, Tanga
Azur Air	Seasonal charter: Kazan, Moscow–Vnukovo, Novosibirsk, St. Petersburg, Samara
British Airways	Seasonal: London–Gatwick (begins 27 May 2027)
Coastal Aviation	Arusha, Dar es Salaam, Kilwa Masoko, Mafia Island, Manyara, Mwanza, Pemba Island, Seronera, Tanga
Condor	Seasonal: Frankfurt
Discover Airlines	Seasonal: Frankfurt
Edelweiss Air	Seasonal: Zurich
Egyptair	Cairo
Ethiopian Airlines	Addis Ababa
Etihad Airways	Seasonal: Abu Dhabi
Flightlink Limited	Arusha, Dar es Salaam, Pemba Island, Seronera
Fly540	Mombasa, Nairobi–Jomo Kenyatta
Flydubai	Dubai–International
FlySafair	Johannesburg–O. R. Tambo
Global Aviation	Charter: Johannesburg–O. R. Tambo
Hi Fly	Seasonal charter: Lisbon
Israir	Tel Aviv
Jambojet	Mombasa
Kenya Airways	Nairobi–Jomo Kenyatta
KLM	Amsterdam
LOT Polish Airlines	Seasonal charter: Prague, Warsaw–Chopin
Malawi Airlines	Lilongwe
Neos	Seasonal charter: Catania, Bologna, Milan–Malpensa, Prague, Rome–Fiumicino, Verona
Nordwind Airlines	Seasonal charter: Moscow–Sheremetyevo
Oman Air	Muscat
Precision Air	Arusha, Dar es Salaam, Nairobi–Jomo Kenyatta, Pemba Island
Qatar Airways	Doha
Regional Air Services	Arusha
Rwandair	Kigali, Mombasa
Safarilink	Mombasa, Nairobi–Wilson
Tropical Air	Dar es Salaam, Mbeya, Pemba Island
TUI Airways	Seasonal: London–Gatwick (begins 3 November 2027)
Turkish Airlines	Istanbul
Uganda Airlines	Entebbe
World2Fly	Seasonal charter: Madrid
ZanAir	Arusha, Dar es Salaam, Pemba Island, Saadani, Selous

=== Cargo ===
Airlines	Destinations
Astral Aviation	Nairobi–Jomo Kenyatta
Kenya Airways Cargo	Nairobi–Jomo Kenyatta, Mombasa

== Statistics ==
- Number of flights handled (2005): 14,302
- Passenger traffic (2005): 418,814
- Cargo handled (2005): 566 tons

== See also ==
- List of airports in Tanzania
- Transport in Tanzania
