= Flightlink =

Tanzanian airline

IATA	ICAO	Call sign
YS	FLZ	FLIGHTLINK
- Founded: 2004; 22 years ago
- AOC #: 25
- Operating bases: Dar es Salaam
- Hubs: Terminal II, Julius Nyerere International Airport, Julius K. Nyerere Road, Dar es salaam, East Tanzania
- Secondary hubs: Arusha Airport
- Focus cities: Dar es Salaam, Zanzibar, Arusha, Serengeti National Park.
- Fleet size: 7
- Destinations: 10+
- Headquarters: Dar es Salaam, Tanzania
- Key people: Captain and managing director: Munawer Dhirani; Director of Operations: Jameel Fazel Ali Muslim Kassam
- Website: www.flightlink.co.tz

Flightlink Limited, formerly Flightlink Air Charters (Tanzania) Limited, is an airline based in the city of Dar es Salaam, in Tanzania. The airline offers scheduled flight services to the primary tourism and business centres across the country. In addition, it offers Air Charter and Medevac services on demand.

It is currently on the List of airlines banned in the European Union.

== History ==
Flightlink was established in 2004 to develop and service the growing tourism requirements, and especially the 'safari' and Zanzibar archipelago destinations. The company slogan is We will fly you there, wherever there is!.

== Overview ==
As of January 2024, Flightlink is primarily a domestic Tanzanian airline. It has a single foreign destination at Moi International Airport, at Mombasa, in neighboring Kenya. At that time, the airline serviced in excess of 10 destinations, with 7 turboprop aircraft, from its hub at Julius Nyerere International Airport in Dar es Salaam. As of December 2022, Flightlink controlled an estimated 2.6 percent of the Tanzanian domestic passenger market behind market leaders Air Tanzania (51.3 percent) and Precision Air (22.9 percent). Other domestic carriers include Auric Air (10.3 percent), Coastal Travel Limited (2.5 percent) and other airlines combined (8.6 percent).

== Destinations ==
As of January 2023, scheduled flights are operated to the following destinations:

Hub
Future
Terminated route

City	Country	IATA	ICAO	Airport
Arusha	Tanzania	ARK	HTAR	Arusha Airport
Dar es Salaam	Tanzania	DAR	HTDA	Julius Nyerere International Airport
Dodoma	Tanzania	DOD	HTDO	Dodoma Airport
Fort Ikoma	Tanzania	N/A	N/A	Fort Ikoma Airstrip
Kogatende	Tanzania	KOG	TZ-0018	Kogatende Airstrip
Lake Manyara	Tanzania	LKY	HTLM	Lake Manyara Airport
Pemba	Tanzania	PMA	HTPE	Pemba Airport
Serengeti	Tanzania	SEU	HTSN	Seronera Airstrip
Mombasa	Kenya	MBA	HKMO	Moi International Airport
Zanzibar	Tanzania	ZNZ	HTZA	Abeid Amani Karume International Airport

== Fleet ==
The current Flightlink fleet consists of the following aircraft (as of October 2026):

Flightlink fleet
Aircraft	In service	Passengers	Notes
ATR72-500	3	72	(as of October 2026)
De Havilland Canada Dash 8	1	37	(as of October 2026)
Beechcraft 1900C	1	19	(as of October 2026)
Cessna 208 Caravan	1	9	(as of October 2026)
Total	8		

Flightlink historic fleet
Aircraft	In service	Passengers	Notes
Embraer EMB 120ER	1	30	(as of August 2025)
