= Tropical Air =

Tanzanian airline

- Commenced operations: 1999
- AOC #: 006
- Hubs: Abeid Amani Karume International Airport
- Fleet size: 9
- Destinations: 7
- Headquarters: Zanzibar, Tanzania
- Key people: Farouk Othman Daud
- Website: www.tropicalair.africa

Tropical Air is an airline based in Zanzibar, Tanzania. It began operations in 1999 with a single aircraft and was the first locally owned airline in Zanzibar. It was founded by Farouk Othman Daud . It operates in Pemba, Dar es Salaam alongside other area in Tanzania.

It is banned from flying the European Union.

== Destinations ==
Scheduled flights are operated to the following destinations:

Hub
Future
Terminated route

City	Country	Airport
Arusha	Tanzania	Arusha Airport
Dar es Salaam	Tanzania	Julius Nyerere International Airport
Mafia Island	Tanzania	Mafia Airport
Mbeya	Tanzania	Songwe Airport
Mtwara	Tanzania	Mtwara Airport
Pemba Island	Tanzania	Pemba Airport
Zanzibar	Tanzania	Abeid Amani Karume International Airport

== Fleet ==
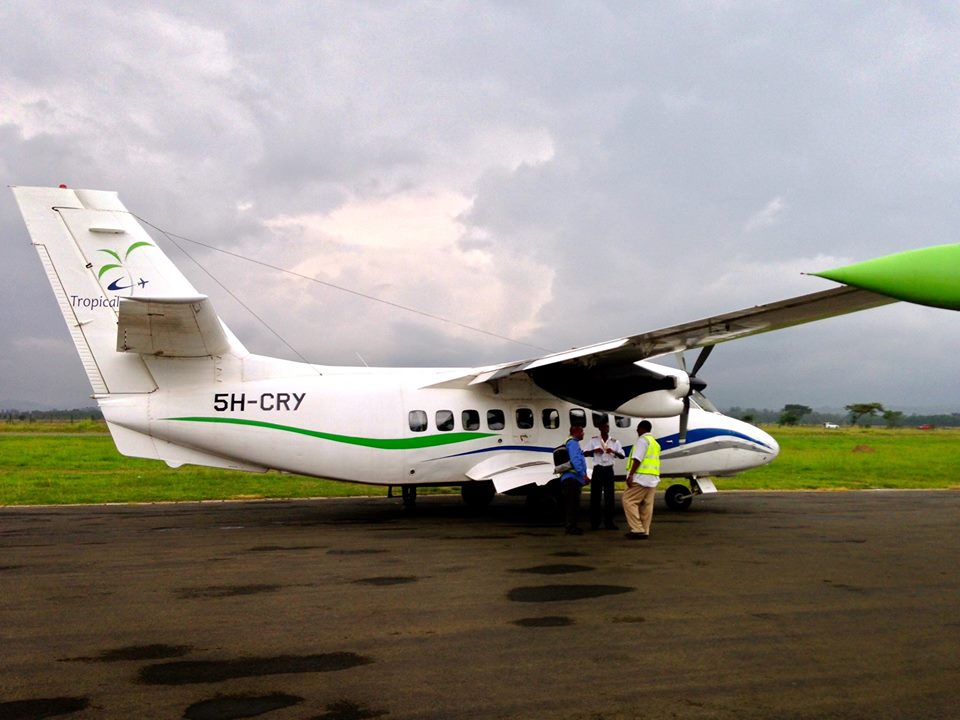
Tropic Air LET-410 plane

=== Current fleet ===
The Tropical Air fleet consists of the following aircraft (as of January 2013):

Tropical Air fleet
Aircraft	In service	Passengers
Piper PA-28 Cherokee	2	3
Piper PA-34 Seneca II	1	5
Piper PA-31 Navajo	1	7
Cessna 208B Grand Caravan	3	13
ATR 42-300	1 (as of August 2025)	50
Total	9	

=== Former fleet ===
The airline previously operated the following aircraft:

- 1 further ATR 42-300
