= ZanAir =

Tanzanian airline

IATA	ICAO	Call sign
—	TAN	ZANAIR
- Commenced operations: 1992
- AOC #: 30
- Hubs: Abeid Amani Karume International Airport
- Fleet size: 5
- Destinations: 6
- Headquarters: Zanzibar, Tanzania
- Website: www.zanair.com

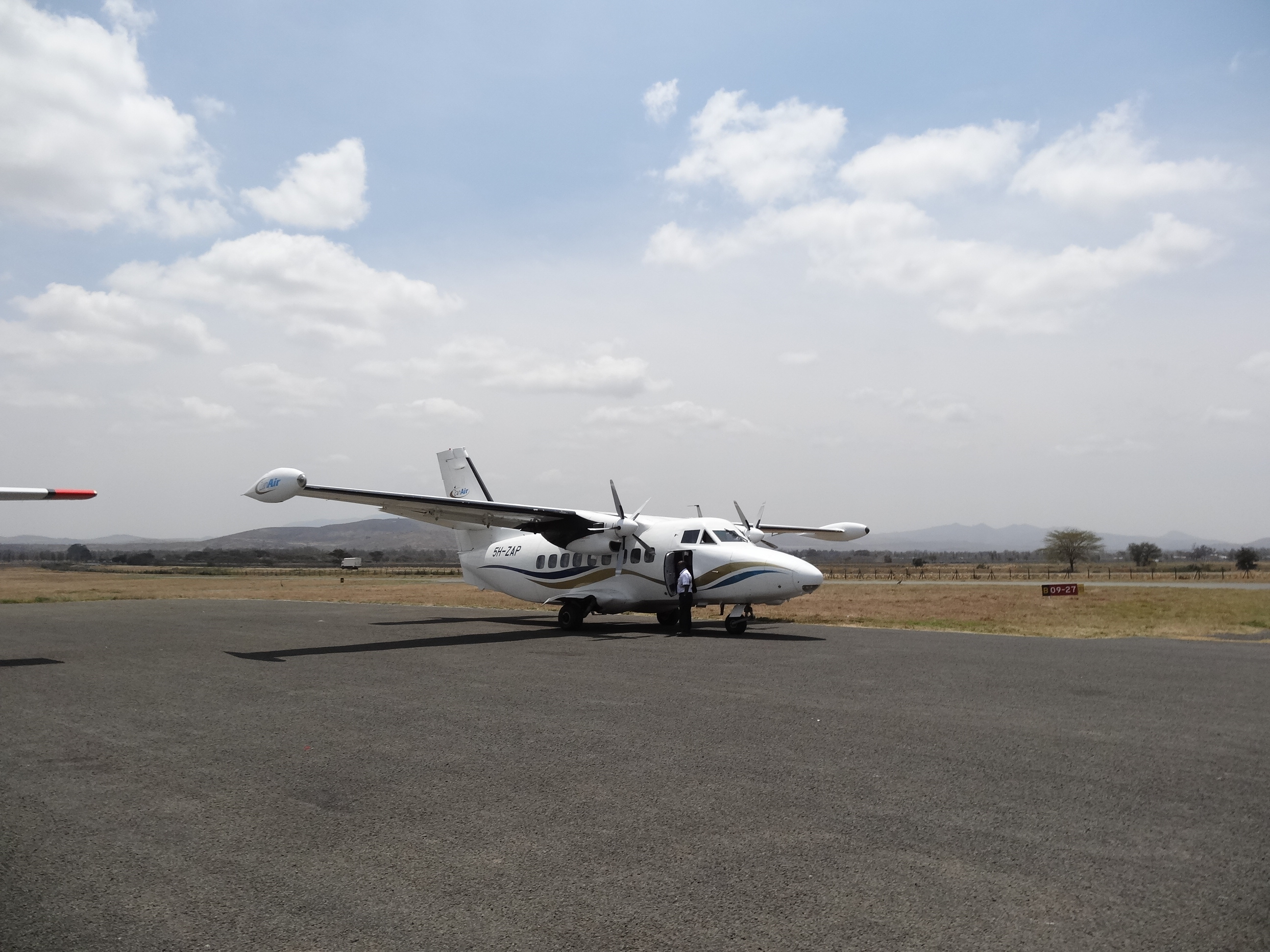
Zanair LET-410 plane

ZanAir Limited is a domestic airline based in Zanzibar, Tanzania; it was founded in 1992 in Zanzibar. It is currently on the List of airlines banned in the EU.

== History ==
ZanAir was established in 1992 by Carl G. Salisbury, who believed there was a market to be explored regarding the tourism industry of Zanzibar and the Tanzania region.

The first flight of ZanAir occurred on May 4, 1991, when Carl G. Salisbury landed on Zanzibar with a Piper Seneca II.

== Destinations ==
Scheduled flights are operated to the following destinations:

Hub
Future
Terminated route

City	Country	Airport
Arusha	Tanzania	Arusha Airport
Dar es Salaam	Tanzania	Julius Nyerere International Airport
Pemba Island	Tanzania	Pemba Airport
Saadani National Park	Tanzania	
Selous Game Reserve	Tanzania	
Zanzibar	Tanzania	Abeid Amani Karume International Airport

== Fleet ==
As of September 2022, all of the aircraft currently in ZanAir's fleet have expired their CoAs, and haven't been renewed as of yet. The ZanAir fleet consists of the following aircraft:

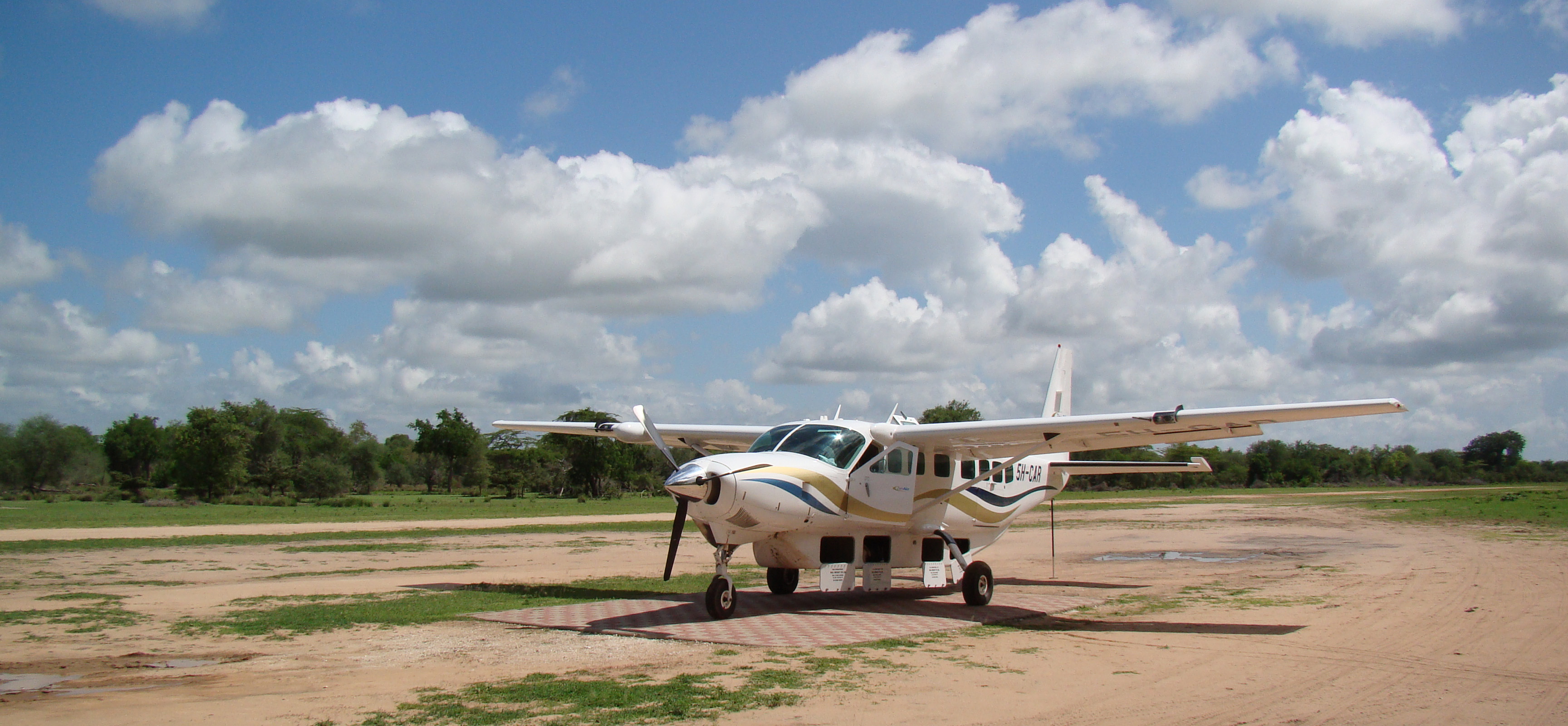
Cessna 208B Caravan

ZanAir fleet
Aircraft	In service
Cessna 207A	1
Cessna 208B Grand Caravan	2
Cessna 404 Titan	2
Total	5

== Accidents and incidents ==
On 24 January 2014, a ZanAir LET-410 skidded off the runway on landing and impacted a group of bushes, causing substantial damage. There were no reported injuries, and the cause was determined to be a brake failure.
