= As Salaam Air =

Tanzanian domestic airline

- Founded: 2011
- AOC #: 55
- Hubs: Zanzibar Airport
- Secondary hubs: Julius Nyerere International Airport
- Fleet size: 3
- Destinations: 4
- Headquarters: Zanzibar, Tanzania
- Website: www.assalaamair.co.tz

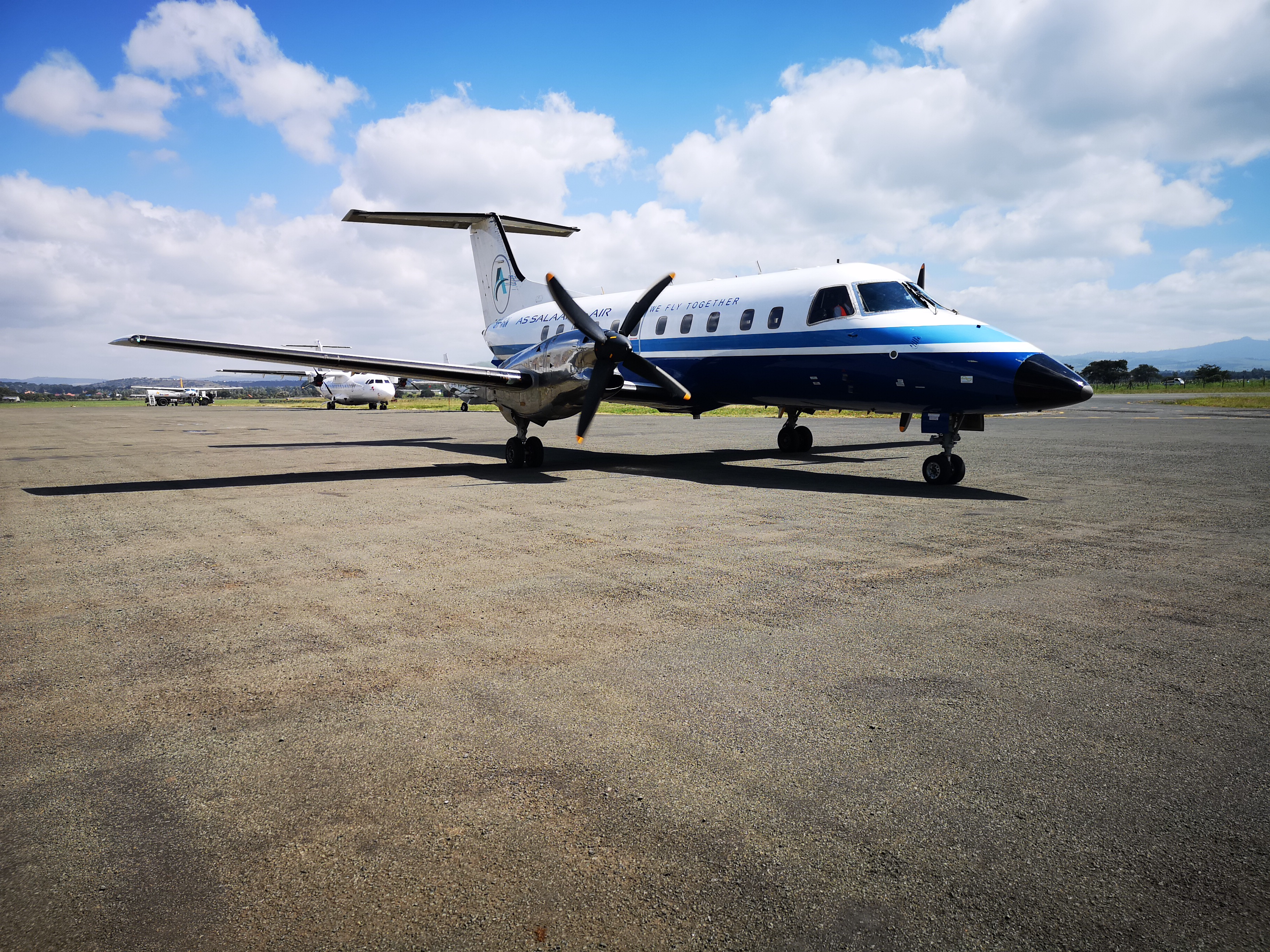
As Salaam Air In Arusha

As Salaam Air is an airline based in Zanzibar, Tanzania, that offers private charters and scheduled operations in Tanzania. The airline operates two Embraer 120 aircraft.

The company is leading airline flying between two spice islands Pemba and Unguja.

It is currently banned from flying in the EU.

== Destinations ==
Scheduled flights are operated to the following destinations within Tanzania:

City	Airport	Notes
Arusha	Arusha Airport	
Dar es Salaam	Julius Nyerere International Airport	
Pemba	Pemba Airport	
Zanzibar	Abeid Amani Karume International Airport	Base

== Fleet ==
As of August 2025, As Salaam Air operates the following aircraft:

Aircraft	Number of aircraft	Seats
Embraer EMB 120ER	3	30
