= Safari Plus =

Tanzanian airline

- Commenced operations: 2011
- AOC #: 46
- Hubs: Julius Nyerere International Airport
- Fleet size: 2
- Destinations: 4
- Parent company: ASB Tanzania Ltd
- Headquarters: Dar es Salaam, Tanzania
- Website: www.safariplus.co.tz

Safari Plus Limited is an air charter company based in Dar es Salaam, Tanzania. It is on the List of airlines banned in the EU.

== Fleet ==
=== Current fleet ===
The Safari Plus fleet consists of the following aircraft (as of June 2025):

Safari Plus fleet
Aircraft	In service
Beechcraft King Air 350ER	1
Beechcraft 1900D	1
Cessna 208B Grand Caravan	2
Pilatus PC-24	1
Total	5

=== Former fleet ===
The airline previously operated the following aircraft:

- 1 further Beechcraft 1900D
