= Lake Manyara Airport =

Airport in Arusha Region

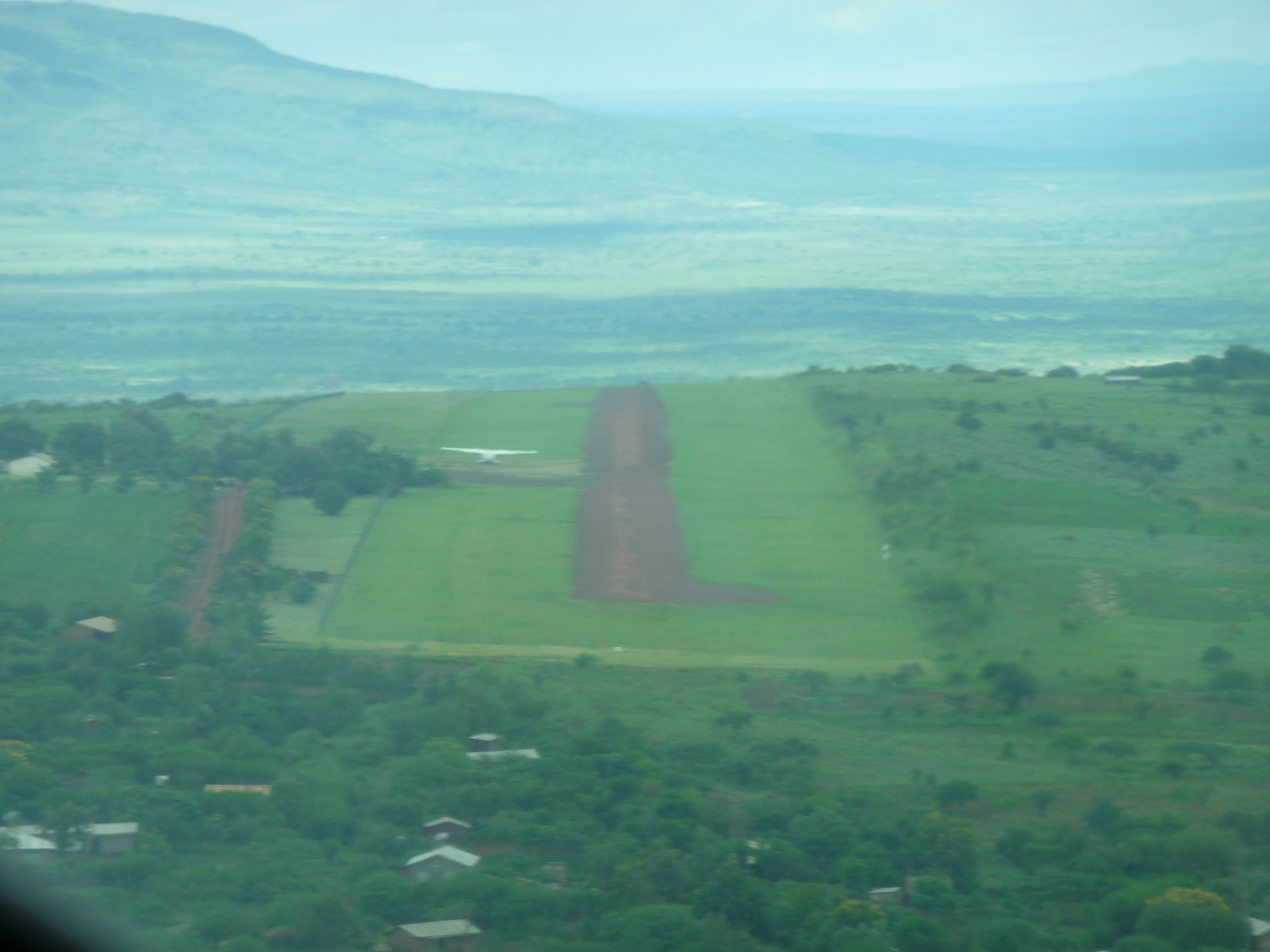

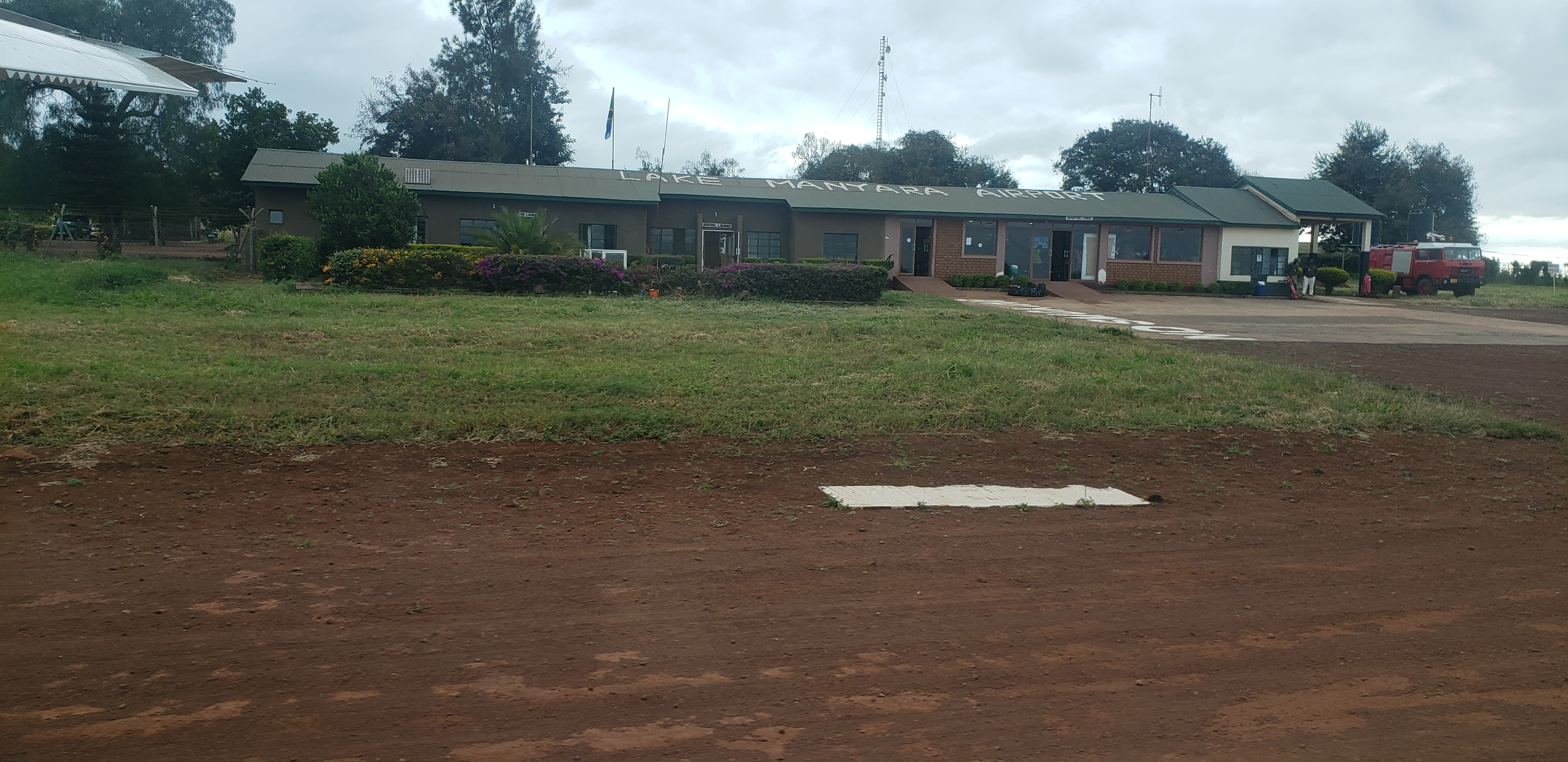
- Lake Manyara Airport terminal building.
- IATA: LKY; ICAO: HTLM

Summary
- Airport type: Public
- Owner: Government of Tanzania
- Operator: Tanzania Airports Authority
- Serves: Lake Manyara National Park
- Elevation AMSL: 4,150 ft / 1,265 m
- Coordinates: 3°22′35″S 35°49′05″E
- Website: www.taa.go.tz

Map
- Location of airport in Tanzania

Runways
Direction	Length		Surface
Direction	m	ft	Surface
12/30	1,220	4,003	Asphalt

Statistics (2024)
- Passengers: 47,022
- Aircraft movements: 9,142
- Sources: TAA World Aero Data Google Maps TCAA

Lake Manyara Airport (IATA: LKY, ICAO: HTLM) is an airport serving the Lake Manyara National Park in the Arusha Region of Tanzania.

== Airlines and destinations ==
Airlines	Destinations
Coastal Aviation	Arusha, Dar es Salaam, Dodoma, Mwanza, Ruaha, Selous, Seronera, Tarangire, Zanzibar
Flightlink	Arusha, Dar es Salaam, Selous, Seronera, Zanzibar

== See also ==
- List of airports in Tanzania
- Transport in Tanzania
