= Msembe Airstrip =

Msembe Airstrip Uwanja mdogo wa Ndege wa Msembe
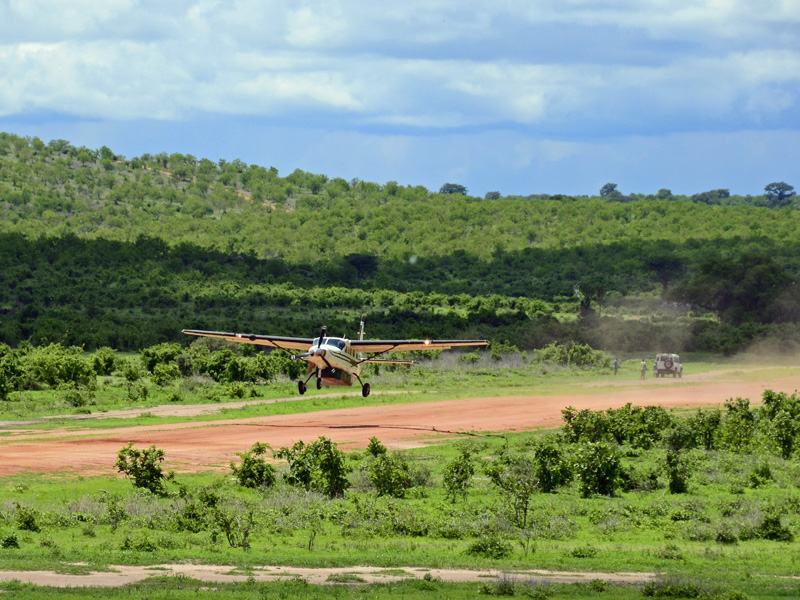
- IATA: none; ICAO: HTMR

Summary
- Airport type: Public
- Owner: Government of Tanzania
- Operator: Tanzania National Parks Authority
- Location: Ruaha National Park, Tanzania
- Elevation AMSL: 2,500 ft / 762 m
- Coordinates: 7°41′05″S 34°55′20″E
- Website: www.tanapa.go.tz

Map
- Location of airstrip in Tanzania HTMR (Africa)

Runways
Direction	Length		Surface
Direction	m	ft	Surface
10/28	1,288	4,226	Gravel
- Sources: TCAA Google Maps

Msembe Airstrip (ICAO: HTMR) is an airstrip serving Ruaha National Park in the Iringa Region of Tanzania. A few domestic airlines fly there, including Coastal Aviation and Auric Air.

== See also ==
- List of airports in Tanzania
- Transport in Tanzania
