= List of the busiest airports in Tanzania =

Tanzania's busiest airports is the list of top busiest airports across various aerodromes in the country. The tables below contain annual data published by the Tanzania Airports Authority on the busiest airports in Tanzania by total passenger traffic, aircraft movements and cargo handled.

The lists are presented in chronological order. The number of total passengers for an airport is measured in persons and includes any passenger who arrives at, departs from or is on a transit from that airport. The number of total aircraft movements is measured in airplane-times and includes all the takeoffs and landings of all kinds of aircraft in scheduled or charter conditions. The total cargo handled is expressed in metric tonnes and includes all the freight and mail that arrive at or depart from the airport.

== 2017–2018 ==
=== Passenger traffic ===
Rank	Airport	City	Region	Number of passengers FY 2018	Number of passengers FY 2017	% change	Rank change
1	Julius Nyerere International Airport	Dar-es-salaam	Dar es Salaam	2,417,090	2,385,456	▲1.32	Steady
3	Kilimanjaro International Airport	Kilimanjaro	Kilimanjaro	1,897,708	1,832,895	▲12.78	Steady
2	Abeid Amani Karume International Airport	Zanzibar	Zanzibar	1,006,300	1,029,999	▲7.33	Steady
4	Mwanza Airport	Mwanza	Mwanza	399,054	398,102	▲0.23	Steady
5	Arusha Airport	Arusha	Arusha	229,366	192,233	▲19.31	Steady
6	Songwe Airport	Mbeya	Mbeya	114,863	118,884	▼ -3.38	Steady
7	Bukoba Airport	Bukoba	Kagera	52,102	45,622	▲14.20	▲1
8	Dodoma Airport	Dodoma	Dodoma	47,396	31,605	▲49.96	▼ -1
9	Lake Manyara Airport	Lake Manyara	Arusha	41,075	35,547	▲15.55	Steady
10	Kigoma Airport	Kigoma	Kigoma	33,459	28,444	▲17.63	Steady
11	Tanga Airport	Tanga	Tanga	25,670	27,477	▼ -6.57	▲1
12	Mafia Airport	Mafia Island	Pwani	25,631	23,615	▲8.53	▲1
13	Tabora Airport	Tabora	Tabora	25,484	18,217	▲39.89	▼ -2
14	Mtwara Airport	Mtwara	Mtwara	20,710	24,462	▼ -15.33	▲1
15	Iringa Airport	Iringa	Iringa	10,013	11,137	▼ -10.09	▼ -1
16	Musoma Airport	Musoma	Mara	7,931	13,154	▼ -39.70	▲1
17	Kahama Airstrip	Kahama	Shinyanga	5,341	4,035	▲32.36	▼ -1
18	Songea Airport	Songea	Ruvuma	4,903	9,823	▼ -50.08	▲2
19	Kasulu Airport	Kasulu	Kigoma	3,788	1,671	▲126.69	▼ -1
20	Loliondo Airstrip	Loliondo	Arusha	2,450	2,417	▲1.36	▼ -1
21	Moshi Airport	Moshi	Kilimanjaro	2,394	2,260	▲5.92	Steady
22	Morogoro Airport	Morogoro	Morogoro	2,084	1,557	▲33.84	Steady
Source: Tanzania Airport Authority

=== Aircraft movements ===
Rank	Airport	City	Region	Aircraft movements FY 2018	Aircraft movements FY 2017	% change	Rank change
1	Julius Nyerere International Airport	Dar-es-salaam	Dar es Salaam	71,420	74,286	▼ -3.85	Steady
4	Kilimanjaro International Airport	Kilimanjaro	Kilimanjaro	80,271	68,706	▲26.42	Steady
2	Abeid Amani Karume International Airport	Zanzibar	Zanzibar	57,493	57,551	▼ -0.10	Steady
3	Arusha Airport	Arusha	Arusha	27,048	23,392	▲15.63	Steady
5	Mwanza Airport	Mwanza	Mwanza	11,788	13,095	▼ -9.98	Steady
6	Lake Manyara Airport	Lake Manyara	Arusha	8,548	7,448	▲14.77	Steady
7	Dodoma Airport	Dodoma	Dodoma	4,519	4,004	▲12.86	▲1
8	Tanga Airport	Tanga	Tanga	3,761	4,681	▼ -19.65	▼ -1
9	Mafia Airport	Mafia Island	Pwani	3,620	3,642	▼ -0.60	Steady
10	Musoma Airport	Musoma	Mara	1,932	1,838	▲5.11	▲2
11	Songwe Airport	Mbeya	Mbeya	1,932	1,959	▼ -1.38	Steady
12	Iringa Airport	Iringa	Iringa	1,733	1,808	▼ -4.15	▲1
13	Tabora Airport	Tabora	Tabora	1,687	1,572	▲7.32	▲1
14	Bukoba Airport	Bukoba	Kagera	1,568	2,302	▼ -31.88	▼ -4
15	Moshi Airport	Moshi	Kilimanjaro	1,488	1,006	▲47.91	▲1
16	Kigoma Airport	Kigoma	Kigoma	1,209	1,192	▲1.43	▼ -1
17	Mtwara Airport	Mtwara	Mtwara	886	972	▼ -8.84	Steady
18	Loliondo Airstrip	Loliondo	Arusha	676	606	▲11.55	Steady
19	Morogoro Airport	Morogoro	Morogoro	525	480	▲9.37	Steady
20	Kasulu Airport	Kasulu	Kigoma	451	310	▲45.48	▲2
21	Kahama Airstrip	Kahama	Shinyanga	435	388	▲12.11	Steady
22	Songea Airport	Songea	Ruvuma	374	452	▼ -17.25	▼ -2
Source: Tanzania Airport Authority

=== Cargo tonnage ===
Rank	Airport	City	Region	Cargo tonnage FY 2018	Cargo tonnage FY 2017	% change	Rank change
1	Julius Nyerere International Airport	Dar-es-salaam	Dar es Salaam	16,162	17,031	▼ -5.10	Steady
2	Kilimanjaro International Airport	Kilimanjaro	Kilimanjaro	3,103	2,646	▲17.27	▲1
3	Abeid Amani Karume International Airport	Zanzibar	Zanzibar	2,366	4,462	▼ -46.97	▼ -1
4	Mwanza Airport	Mwanza	Mwanza	2,109	2,277	▼ -7.37	Steady
5	Songwe Airport	Mbeya	Mbeya	747	649	▲15.10	Steady
6	Dodoma Airport	Dodoma	Dodoma	156	7	▲2128.57	▲7
7	Bukoba Airport	Bukoba	Kagera	55	36	▲52.77	Steady
8	Arusha Airport	Arusha	Arusha	55	25	▲120	▲1
9	Kasulu Airport	Kasulu	Kigoma	42	9	▲366.66	▲3
10	Mtwara Airport	Mtwara	Mtwara	41	36	▲13.88	▼ -3
11	Kahama Airstrip	Kahama	Shinyanga	36	19	▲89.47	▼ -1
12	Songea Airport	Songera	Ruvuma	23	5	▲360	▲2
13	Iringa Airport	Iringa	Iringa	18	1	▲1700	▲2
14	Kigoma Airport	Kigoma	Kigoma	12	12	▼0	▼ -3
15	Musoma Airport	Musoma	Mara	6	45	▼ -86.66	▼ -9
16	Moshi Airport	Moshi	Kilimanjaro	2	1	▲100	▼ -1
17	Tabora Airport	Tabora	Tabora	2	1	▲100	▼ -2
Source: Tanzania Airport Authority
