= Kahama =

Kahama may refer to:

- Kahama, Angola, a commune in Cunene Province
- Kahama Rural District, one of the districts of Shinyanga Region, Tanzania
- Kahama Urban District, one of the districts of Shinyanga Region, Tanzania
- Kahama, Tanzania, a town in the district
  - Kahama Airstrip
- Kahama United, a football team in the district
- Janet Bina Kahama, a Tanzanian politician
- Roman Catholic Diocese of Kahama, a diocese of the Catholic Church in Tanzania
- Kahama Chimpanzee Community, one of two communities of chimpanzees in Gombe Stream National Park, Tanzania which engaged in violent conflict 1974-78
