= HTGW =

HTGW may stand for:

- High_temperature_insulation_wool#Alkaline_Earth_Silicate_Wool_.28AES_Wool.29
- ICAO airport code for Songwe Airport
- Hollyford Track Guided Walk
