= Tabora Airport =

Tabora Airport Uwanja wa Ndege wa Tabora (Swahili)
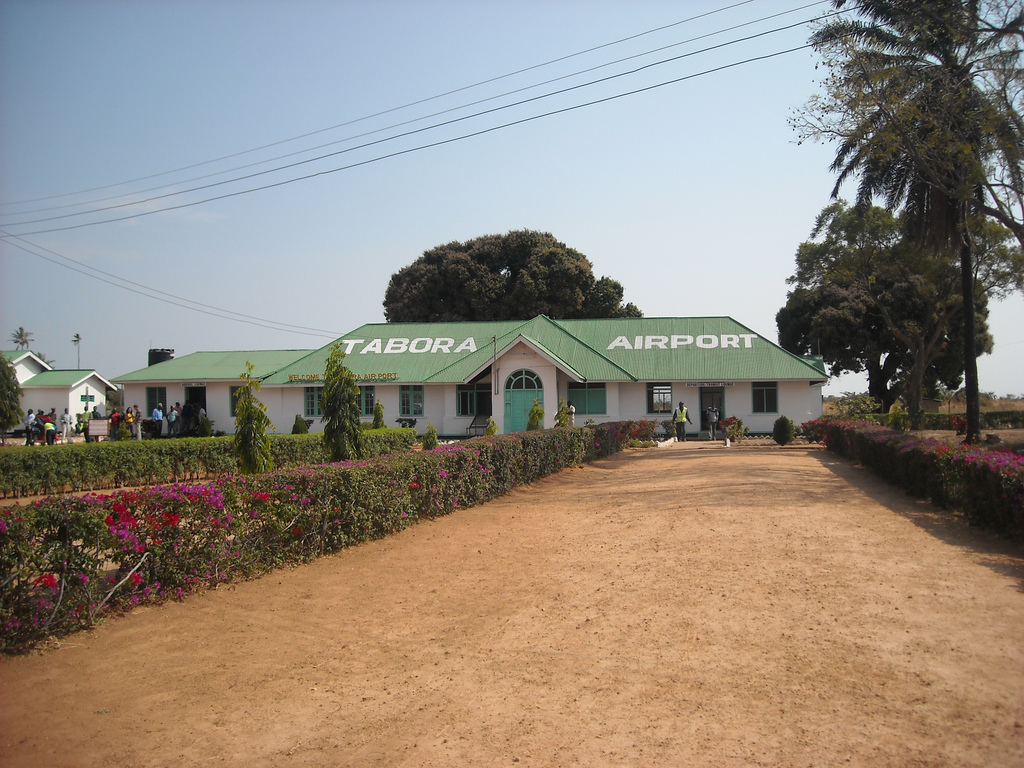
- IATA: TBO; ICAO: HTTB; WMO: 63832

Summary
- Airport type: Public
- Owner: Government of Tanzania
- Operator: Tanzania Airports Authority
- Location: Tabora, Tanzania
- Elevation AMSL: 3,868 ft / 1,179 m
- Coordinates: 5°04′34″S 32°49′50″E
- Website: www.taa.go.tz

Map
- Location of airport in Tanzania

Runways
Direction	Length		Surface
Direction	m	ft	Surface
13/31	1,900	6,234	Asphalt
08/26	1,500	4,921	Gravel

Statistics (2024)
- Passengers: 19,302
- Aircraft movements: 1,256
- Sources: TAA GCM Google Maps TCAA

Tabora Airport (IATA: TBO, ICAO: HTTB) is an airport in west-central Tanzania serving Tabora. It is 8 kilometres (5.0 mi) south of the town. Surface access from Tabora is via the tarmac Tabora to Ndembelwa village road, and then a three kilometre airport access tarmac road. Adjacent to the airport is the Tabora Command Military Base 202.

== History ==
The former dirt strip of the Tabora Airport was improved and lengthened in 1942 during World War II. The South African Air Force supervised the work and built the hangar and the control tower. The airport was needed as a relay station for airborne supplies and troops destined for the North African desert campaign.

== Facilities ==
Runway 08/26 is used as a taxiway to the terminal and hangar; there is no separate taxiway. The existing apron has a tarmac surface.

The airport has a terminal building, with a separate fire-suppression building. The airport manager has his office in a separate building. There is a hangar, a motor vehicle garage, and the control tower. The car park has a gravel surface. There are plans to pave the main runway and apron with asphalt (bitumen) and resurface the gravel on the alternate runway.

== Airlines and destinations ==
Airlines	Destinations
Air Tanzania	Dar es Salaam, Kigoma

== See also ==
- List of airports in Tanzania
- Transport in Tanzania
