= Precision Air =

Tanzanian airline based in Dar es Salaam

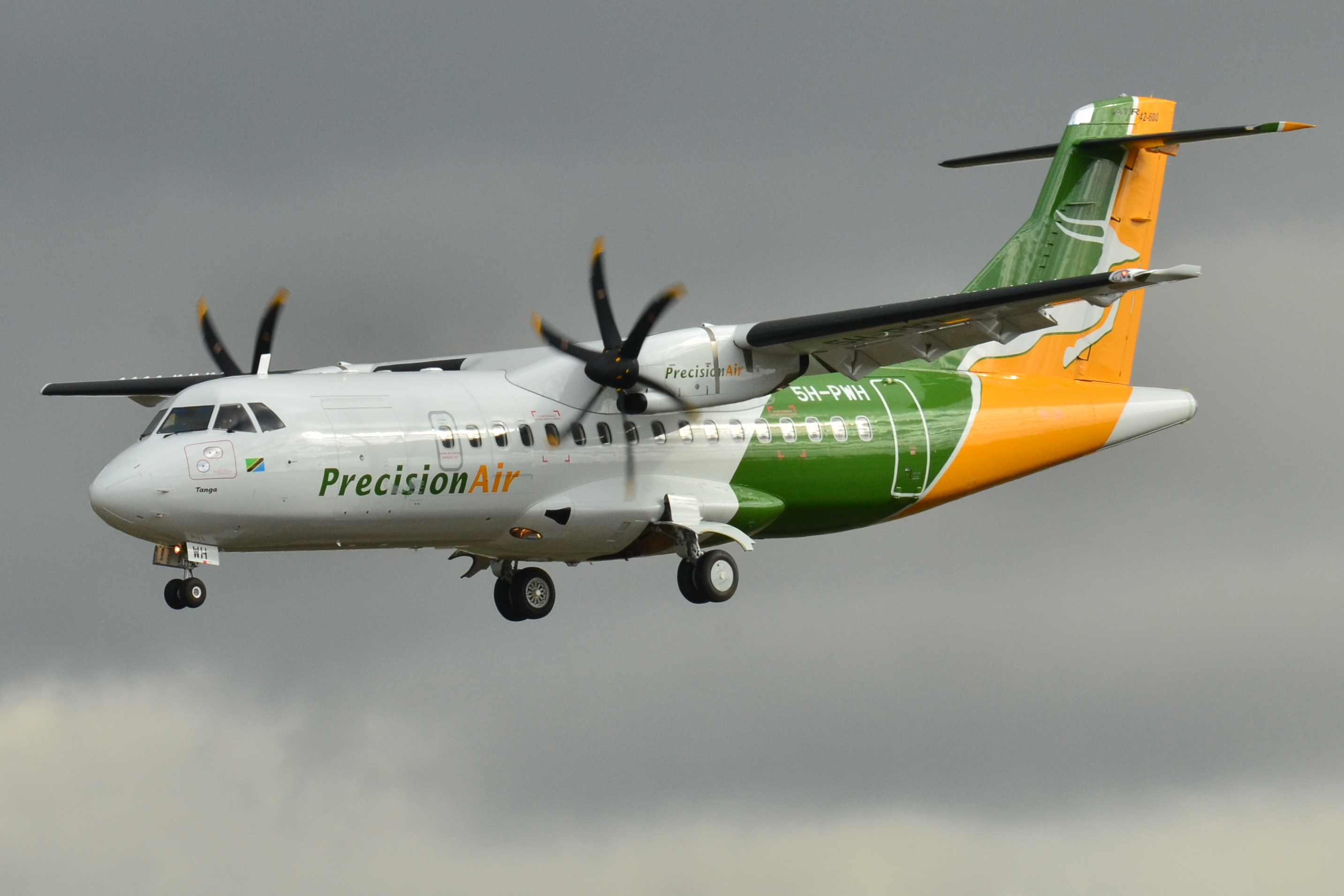
- ATR 42-600
IATA	ICAO	Call sign
PW	PRF	PRECISION AIR
- Founded: 1991
- Commenced operations: November 1993
- AOC #: TCAA/AOC/003
- Hubs: Dar es Salaam
- Secondary hubs: Kilimanjaro
- Frequent-flyer program: PAA Royal
- Fleet size: 8
- Destinations: 7
- Traded as: DSE: PAL
- Headquarters: Dar es Salaam, Tanzania
- Key people: Harry Kitilya (Chairperson); Patrick Mwanri (CEO)
- Revenue: ▲TSh 162 billion (US$61 million) (FY 2024)
- Profit: ▲TSh −32 billion (US$−12 million) (FY 2024)
- Employees: 413 (2024)
- Website: www.precisionairtz.com

Precision Air Services Plc (operating as Precision Air; DSE:PAL) is a Tanzanian airline based at Julius Nyerere International Airport in Dar es Salaam. The airline operates scheduled passenger services to Nairobi and Comoros; and to various airports and airstrips in Tanzania. Kenya Airways owns 41.23% of the airline, and is a component company of the Tanzania All Share Index.

It is currently banned from flying into the EU along with all Tanzanian airlines.

== History ==
Precision Air was incorporated in Tanzania in January 1991 as a private airline and started operations in 1993. At first, it operated as a private charter air transport company but in November 1993 changed to offer scheduled services to serve the growing tourist market. It introduced a 737-300 courtesy of Kenya Airways in 1999.

In 2006, Precision Air became the first Tanzanian airline to pass the IATA Operational Safety Audit.

In April 2011, the airline became a public company.

== Corporate affairs ==
=== Ownership ===
Precision Air was privately owned until 2003, when Kenya Airways acquired a 49 percent stake, paying US$2 million, weeks after its rival South African Airways acquired a 49 percent stake in Air Tanzania for US$20 million. The remaining 51 percent was retained by Michael Shirima, the founder of the airline.

In October 2011, Precision Air floated shares in its stock in an initial public offering on the Dar es Salaam Stock Exchange, after which Shirima's and Kenya Airways's stakes declined and the new share subscribers owned 15.86 percent. As of 31 March 2016, the major shareholders were:

Name	No. of shares	Interest
Michael Shirima	68,857,650	42.91%
Kenya Airways	66,157,350	41.23%
Precision Air Employee Share Option Scheme	1,765,300	1.10%
Other shareholders	23,689,500	14.76%
Total	160,469,800	100.00%

=== Business trends ===
It was a private company until 2011, so published figures were not generally available before the initial public offering prospectus of 12 September 2011. Since then, full Annual Reports and Financial Statements have been published each year.

Trends over recent years for the Precision Air group (Precision Air Services Plc and its subsidiaries Precision Handling Limited and Precise Systems Limited) (as at year ending 31 March; 31 December from 2018 onwards) are:

	2013	2014	2015	2016	2017	3.2018	12.2018	2019	2020	2021	2022	2023	2024
Turnover (TSh million)	181,358	141,262	105,400	90,751	79,756	97,108	97,925	124,486	56,877	71,153	117,667	139,817	162,193
Profits (PBT) (TSh million)	−30,812	−11,400	-83,900	−91,676	−26,941	−21,099	−37,080	-44,139	-45,087	-43,162	5,915	−77,394	−31,755
Number of employees	717	608	536	509	436	356	396	398	383	376	393	401	413
Number of passengers ('000)	896	688	452	375	409	474	366	484	246	285	480	482	472
Passenger load factor (%)	62	65	59	52	52	55	54	52	49	52	64	65	66
Number of aircraft (at year end)	12	10	10	10	10	10	10	10	10	10	8	8	8
Notes/sources							(Note: 2018: Figures for 9 months)		(Note: 2020: Activities and income in 2020 were severely reduced by the impact of the coronavirus pandemic)				

Published reports in June 2013 indicated that Precision Air had encountered substantial financial difficulties, stemming in part from losses incurred while operating flights to and from Johannesburg, South Africa. Those flights ended in September 2012. The Citizen, a Tanzanian newspaper, reported in August 2013 that the airline "desperately" needed a US$32 million bailout package from the Tanzanian government or other non-shareholder sources. The airline's problems increased in 2011 when it received only US$7.4 million of the US$17.5 million in cash that the airline hoped to receive when first listed on the Dar es Salaam Stock Exchange. Increasing fuel prices, taxes, and levies plus currency fluctuations and the refusal of minority owner Kenya Airways to contribute capital had also hurt the airline.

== Destinations ==
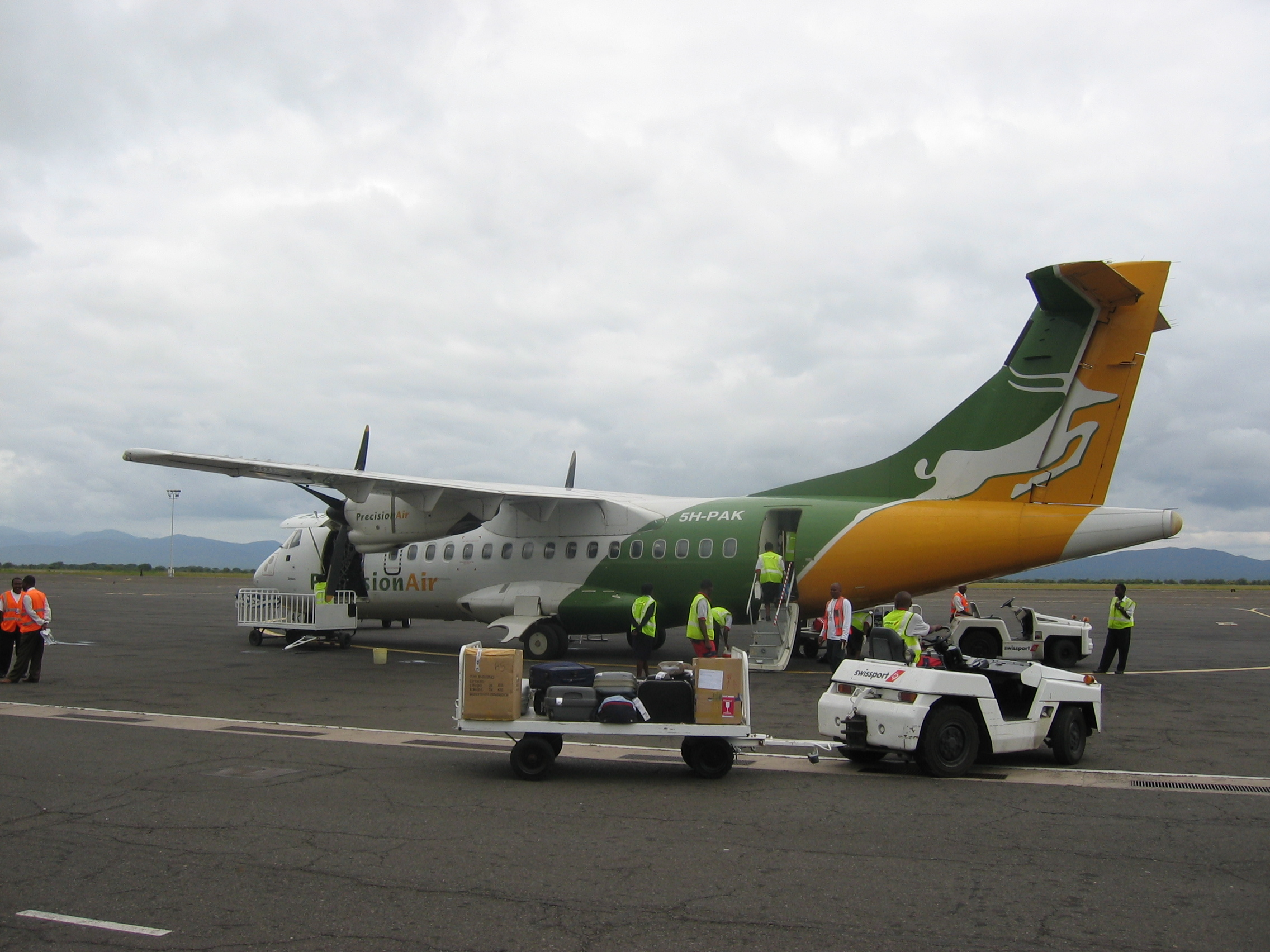
Precision Air ATR 42-300 at Kilimanjaro International Airport in 2006.

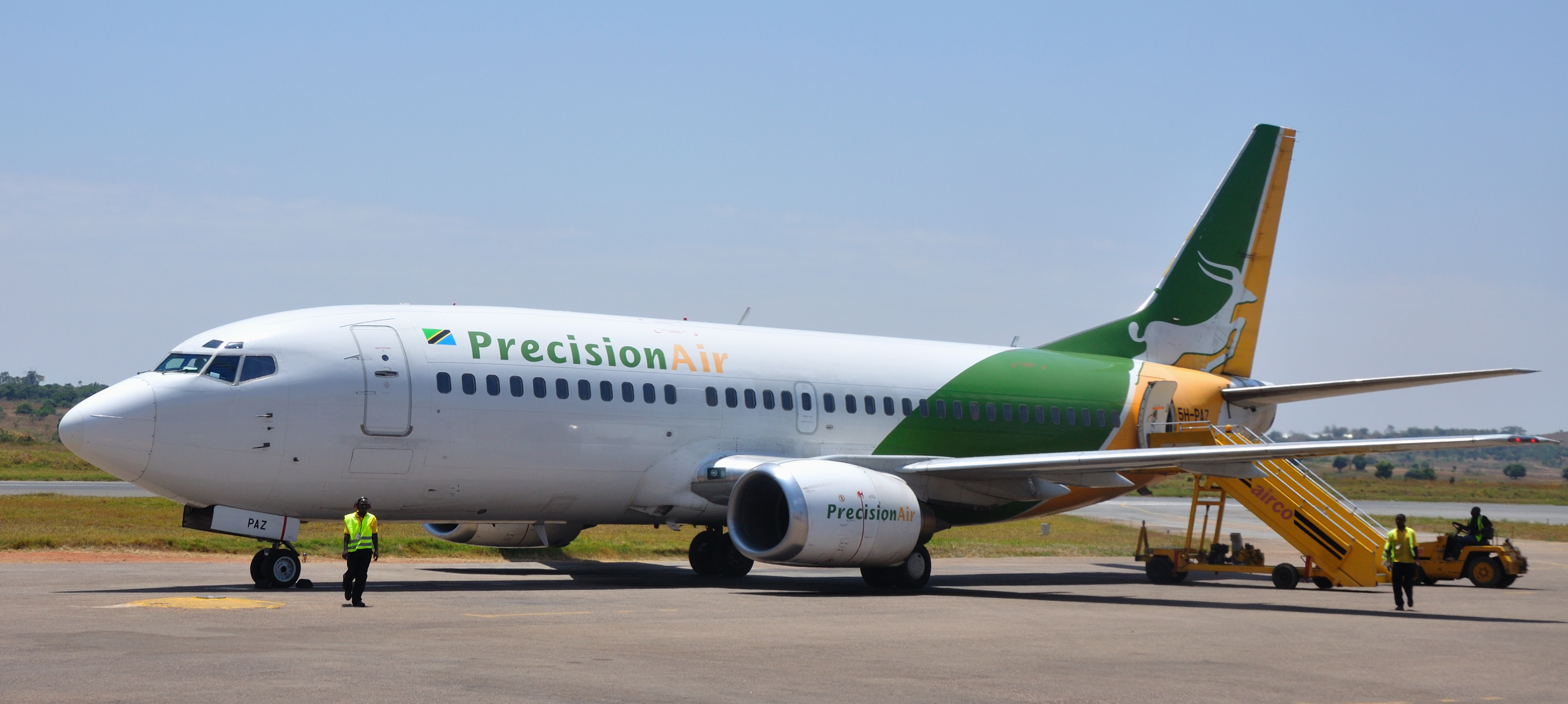
Precision Air Boeing 737-300 at Mwanza Airport in 2010.

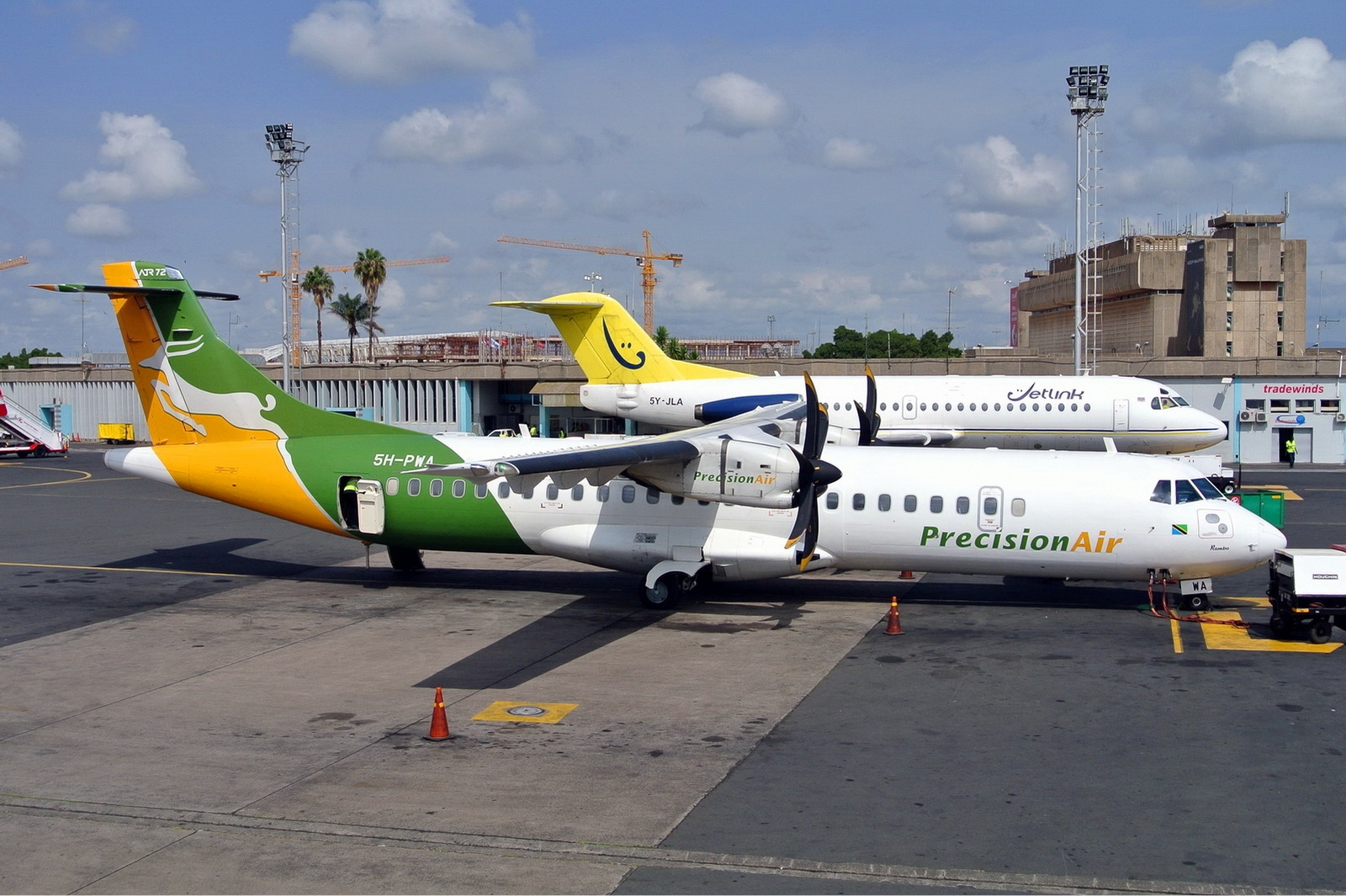
Precision Air ATR 72-212A at Jomo Kenyatta International Airport, Nairobi, in 2012.

As of November 2026, the airline serves the following destinations:

Country	City	Airport	Notes	Refs
Comoros	Anjouan	Ouani Airport	Suspended	
Comoros	Moroni	Prince Said Ibrahim International Airport	Suspended	
Democratic Republic of Congo	Lubumbashi	Lubumbashi International Airport	Terminated	
Kenya	Mombasa	Moi International Airport	Terminated	
Kenya	Nairobi	Jomo Kenyatta International Airport		
South Africa	Johannesburg	O. R. Tambo International Airport	Terminated	
Tanzania	Arusha	Arusha Airport		
Tanzania	Bukoba	Bukoba Airport	Terminated	
Tanzania	Dar es Salaam	Julius Nyerere International Airport	Hub	
Tanzania	Dodoma	Dodoma Airport	Terminated	
Tanzania	Kahama	Kahama Airstrip		
Tanzania	Moshi / Arusha	Kilimanjaro International Airport	Hub	
Tanzania	Mbeya	Songwe Airport	Terminated	
Tanzania	Mtwara	Mtwara Airport		
Tanzania	Mwanza	Mwanza Airport		
Tanzania	Serengeti–Seronera	Seronera Airstrip	Terminated	
Tanzania	Zanzibar	Abeid Amani Karume International Airport		
Uganda	Entebbe	Entebbe International Airport	Terminated	
Zambia	Lusaka	Kenneth Kaunda International Airport	Terminated	

== Partnerships ==
=== Codeshare agreements ===
Precision Air has codeshare agreements with the following four airlines:

1. Etihad Airways (Abu Dhabi-Dar es Salaam)
2. Kenya Airways (various routes)
3. LAM Mozambique Airlines (Maputo–Nampula–Pemba–Dar es Salaam)
4. RwandAir (Kigali–Kilimanjaro)

=== Interline agreements ===
In 2011, Precision Air entered into an interline agreement with Qatar Airways, allowing the latter's passengers to connect to other east African destinations such as Arusha and Zanzibar via Dar es Salaam and Kilimanjaro International Airport.

== Fleet ==
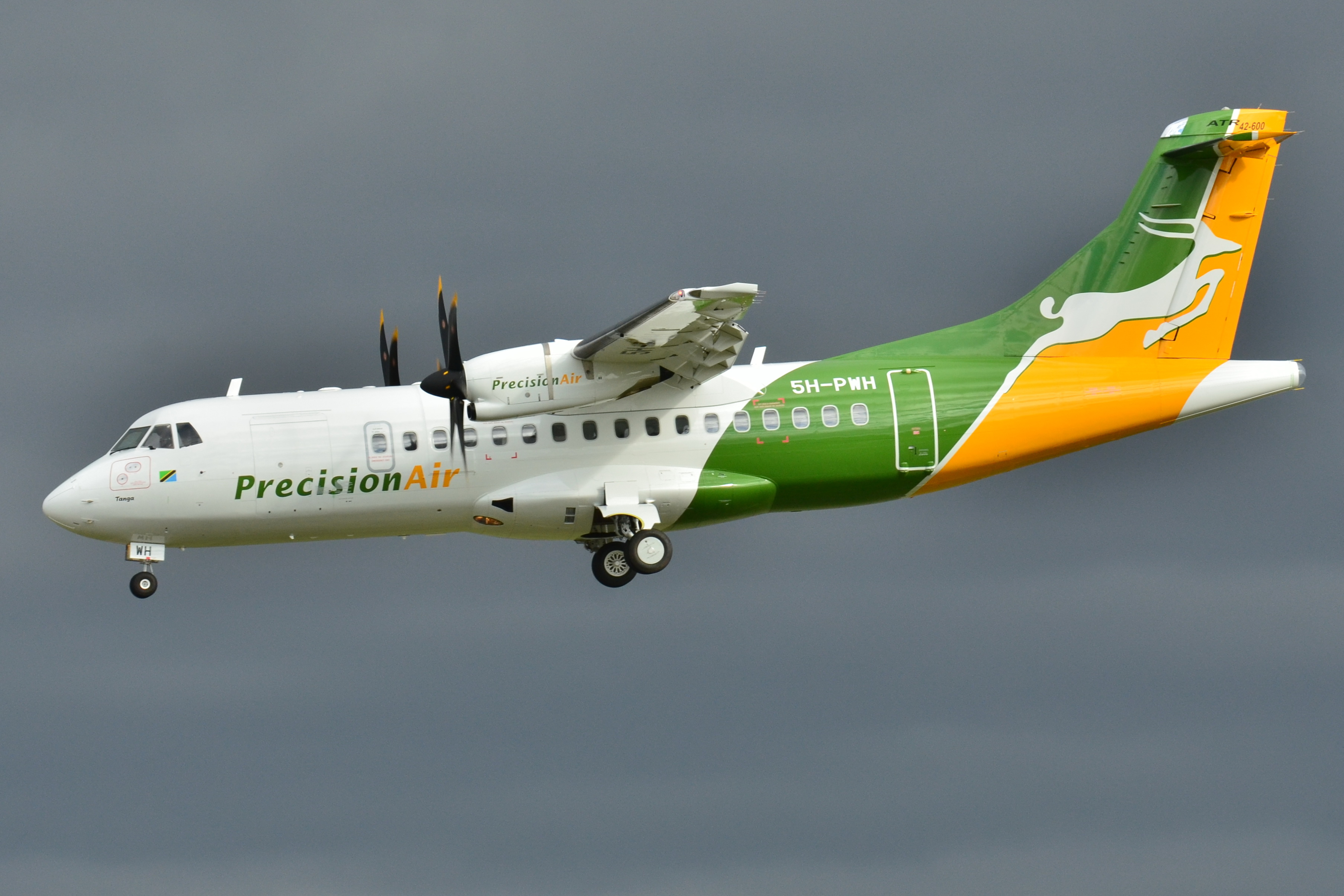
ATR 42-600

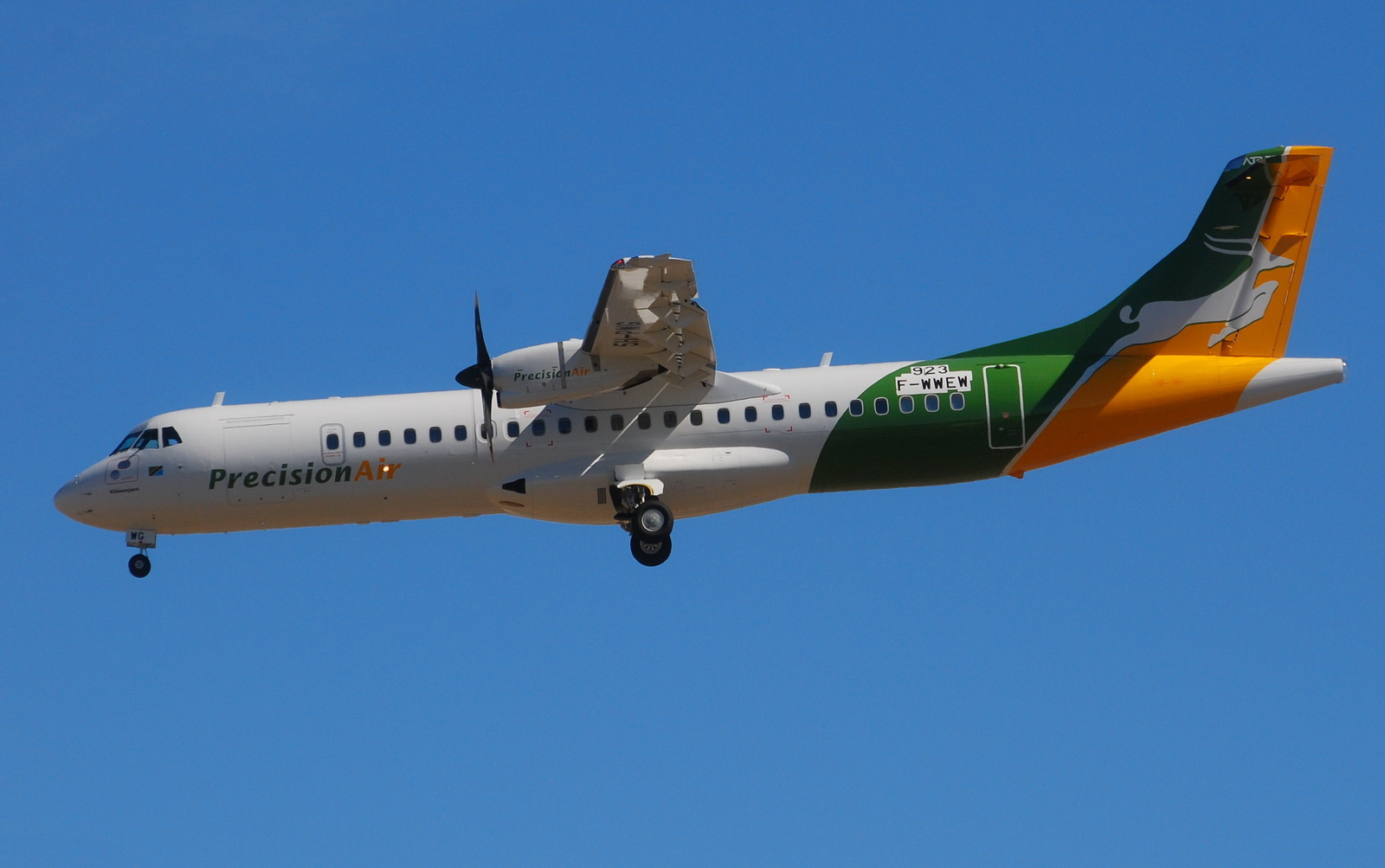
ATR 72-500

=== Current fleet ===
As of August 2025, Precision Air operates the following aircraft:

Precision Air fleet
Aircraft	In Service	Orders	Passengers			Notes
Aircraft	In Service	Orders	C	Y	Total	Notes
ATR 42–500	1	—	0	48	48	
ATR 42–600	2	—	0	48	48	
ATR 72–500	5	—	0	70	70	
Total	8	0				

=== Historical fleet ===
The airline has previously operated the following aircraft:

- ATR 42-320
- Boeing 737–300

== Accidents and incidents ==
According to the Aviation Safety Network Precision Air has had seven accidents or incidents. One of those caused 19 fatalities.

- 26 July 1999: A Let L-410UVP-E9, tail number 5H-PAB, made a belly landing at Arusha Airport on a training flight while doing a touch and go landing. The two crew and three passengers were not injured.
- 16 November 2004: A Let L-410UVP-E20, tail number 5H-PAC, crash landed while on a training flight at Kilimanjaro Airport. The two pilots, who had not put on their shoulder straps, sustained facial injuries.
- 8 July 2007: An ATR 72–212, tail number 5H-PAR, had a runway excursion on landing at Nairobi's Jomo Kenyatta International Airport runway 06. It veered to the right, went over a ditch, and came to a stop on Taxiway F. The nose wheel collapsed. The four crew and 62 passengers were not injured. The aircraft was substantially damaged. The probable cause of this accident was power asymmetry during application of reverse thrust on landing. The control levers were jammed in one position.
- On 13 December 2013, an ATR 42–600 (5H–PWI) made a safe landing at Arusha Airport after its four tires deflated upon landing. All 37 passengers and 4 crew were safe. The airline subsequently explained that higher braking forces, necessitated by the aircraft landing with a tailwind, caused the deflations.
- 10 July 2014: An ATR 72–500, tail number 5H-PWA, was halfway to Dar es Salaam from Mwanza during normal cruise when the number 2 engine seized. This necessitated a diversion to Kilimanjaro International Airport. The aircraft touched down normally; however, after selecting ground idle (as per the captain's explanation), the aircraft veered to the left and exited the runway hitting one of the runway edge lights and proceeded to roll on the grass field parallel to runway 09 for approximately 180 meters before subsequently regaining the runway. No injuries were reported.
- 9 December 2018 Flight PW 722 with 68 passengers from Nairobi to Mwanza via Kilimanjaro had multiple birdstrikes on approach, including on the wheels that caused difficulties on landing.
- 6 November 2022: Precision Air Flight 494, an ATR 42-500 (5H-PWF) with 39 passengers and 4 crew crashed in Lake Victoria while landing at Bukoba Airport, Tanzania. There were 19 deaths. It was the first fatal accident in the airline's history. A Ministry of Transport report determined that the pilot attempted to land Bukoba in poor weather, against the advice of the first officer, instead of diverting to Mwanza.
