= Kilimanjaro International Airport =

Airport in located in Kilimanjaro Region, Tanzania

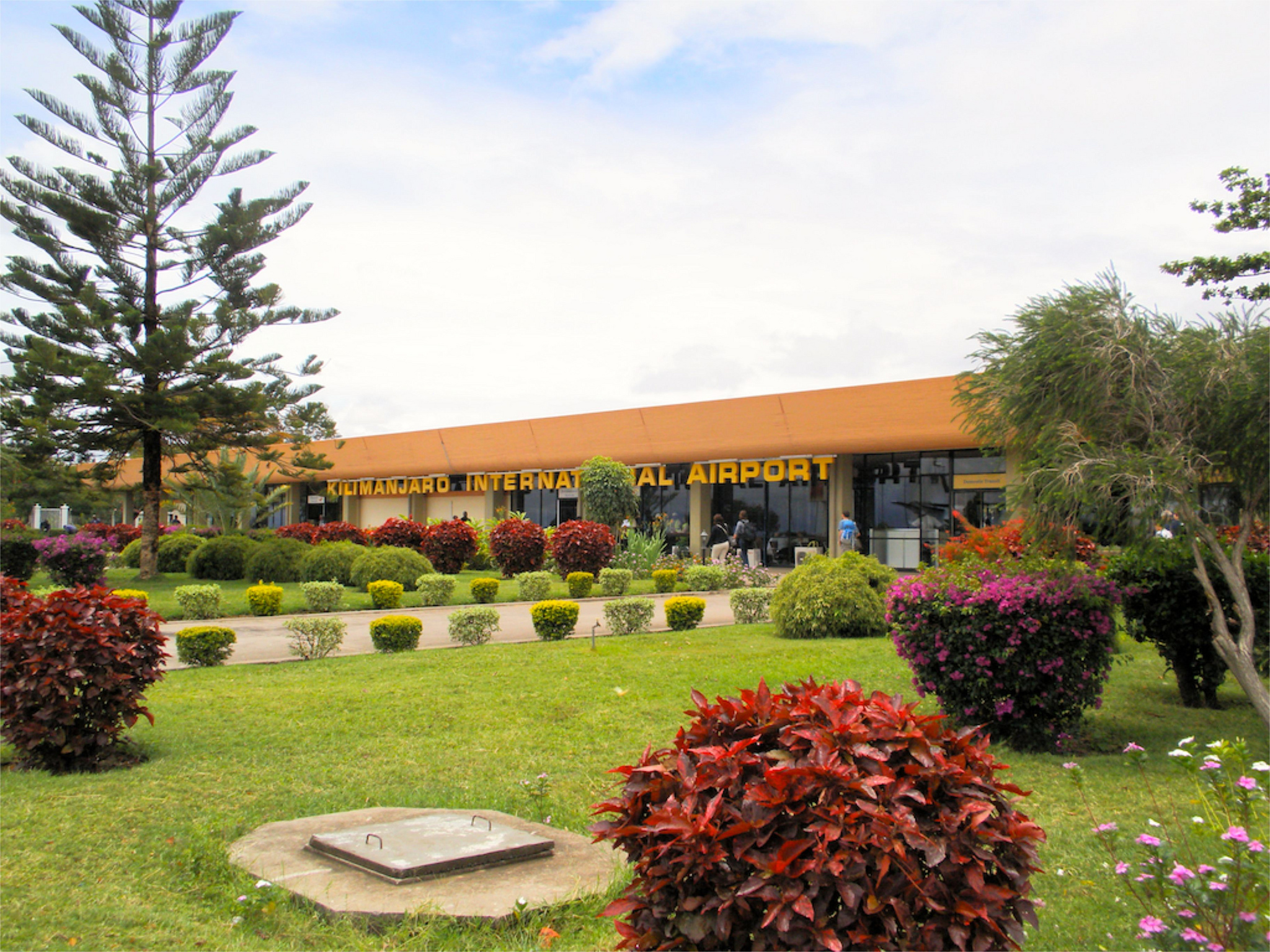
- IATA: JRO; ICAO: HTKJ; WMO: 63791

Summary
- Airport type: Public
- Owner/Operator: Tanzania Airports Authority
- Serves: Kilimanjaro National Park and Arusha
- Location: Hai District, Kilimanjaro Region, Tanzania
- Elevation AMSL: 2,932 ft (894 m)
- Coordinates: 03°25′46″S 37°04′28″E
- Website: kilimanjaroairport.go.tz

Map
- Location of Kilimanjaro International Airport. JRO (Africa) JRO (Earth)

Runways
Direction	Length		Surface
Direction	m	ft	Surface
09/27	3,600	11,811	Asphalt

Statistics (2024)
- Passengers: 1,044,276
- Aircraft movements: 24,202
- Cargo (tonnes): 6,562
- Source: TAA

Kilimanjaro International Airport (KIA) (IATA: JRO, ICAO: HTKJ) is an international airport serving the Kilimanjaro National Park in Tanzania, as well as nearby cities like Arusha and Moshi. The airport handled 1,044,276 passengers in 2024, making it the third busiest airport in the country, after Julius Nyerere International Airport in Dar es Salaam and Abeid Amani Karume International Airport in Zanzibar. It is the largest airport in northern Tanzania by size and passenger volume.

== Overview ==
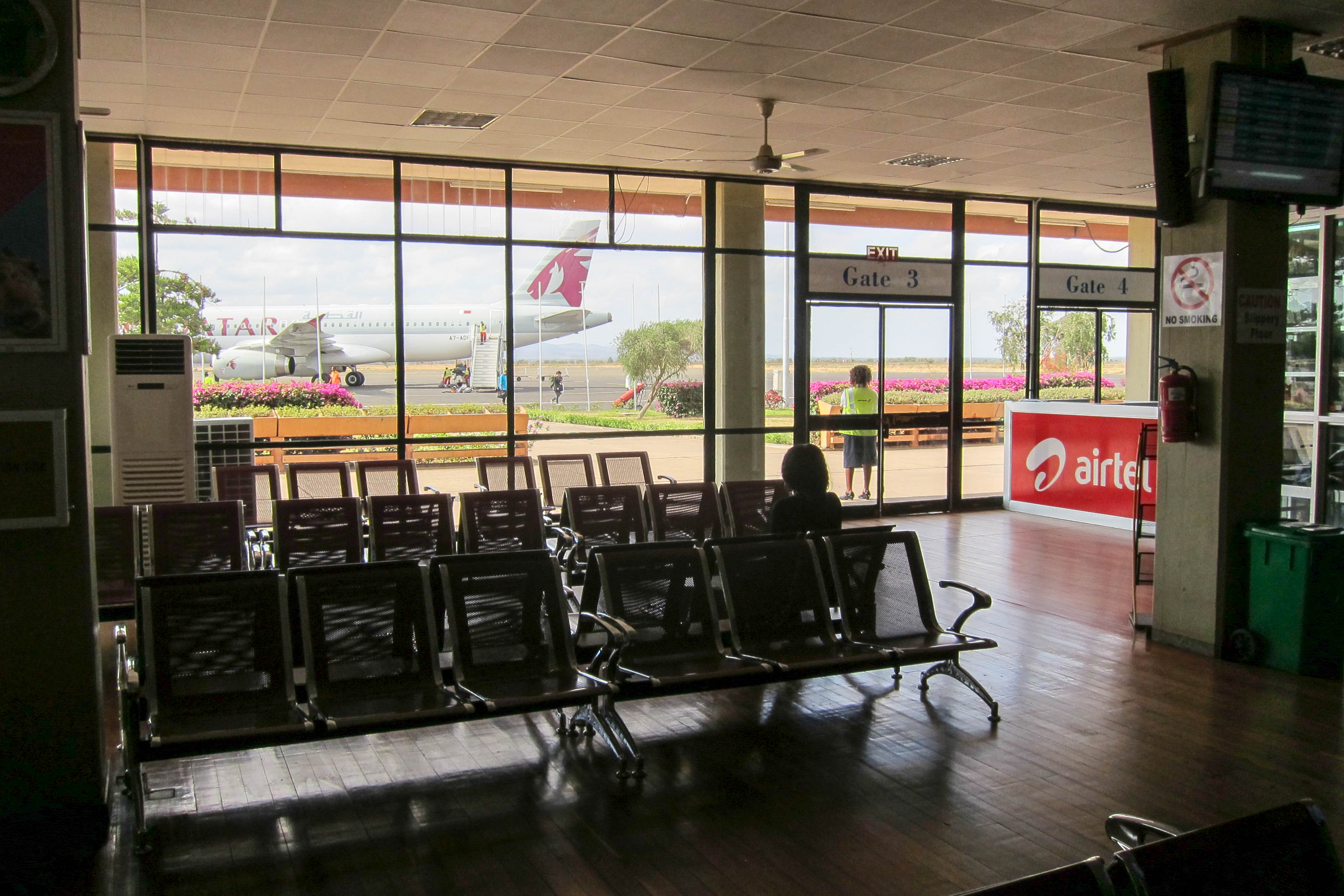
The passenger boarding gate area

Many international visitors go to national parks in Tanzania, to the Indian Ocean coast, to islands such as Zanzibar, and to Lake Victoria, reflected in the routes of connecting flights. With a runway almost 11,811 feet (3,600 m) long, the airport can handle aircraft as large as Boeing 747s and Antonov 124s. The airport served 665,147 passengers in 2012, a 3.7 percent increase over 2011. The airport served 802,731 passengers in 2014, of whom 45 percent were international, 38 percent domestic, and 17 percent transit.

On 19 February 2014, the governments of Tanzania and the Netherlands signed a grant arrangement to rehabilitate the airport, including its aprons, taxiways, and terminal building. The total cost of the project was expected to be €35.5 million, with €15.0 million funded by the Netherlands and the remainder by Tanzania. The design phase, completed by 2014, was financed entirely by the Dutch government. In November 2015, renovations began at the airport, aimed at doubling its capacity from 600,000 passengers to 1.2 million annually. The renovation work was being done by BAM International, a subsidiary of the Royal BAM Group in the Netherlands, at a cost of US$39.7 million, and was expected to be completed in May 2017.

== History ==
Kilimanjaro Airport cost US$13 million to build. It opened on 2 December 1971, with construction financed by a long-term loan from the Italian government.

In 1998, it became the first international airport in Africa to be privatised. It is operated by the Kilimanjaro Airport Development Company.

The airport facilitates the tourism industry for visitors travelling to four regions: Arusha Region, Kilimanjaro Region, Mara Region and Manyara Region. Attractions in the regions include Mount Kilimanjaro National Park, Arusha National Park, Tarangire National Park, Lake Manyara National Park, the Ngorongoro Conservation Area, and Serengeti National Park. The airport bills itself as the "Gateway to Africa's Wildlife Heritage".

== Airlines and destinations ==
The following airlines maintain regular, scheduled passenger and cargo service to and from Kilimanjaro International Airport.

Airlines	Destinations
Air France	Paris–Charles de Gaulle
Airlink	Nairobi, Zanzibar
Air Tanzania	Dar es Salaam, London–Gatwick (begins July 2027) Zanzibar
British Airways	Seasonal: London–Gatwick (begins 27 May 2027)
Brussels Airlines	Brussels
Edelweiss Air	Seasonal: Zurich
Ethiopian Airlines	Addis Ababa
Flightlink	Dar-es-Salaam, Nairobi, Zanzibar
flydubai	Dubai–International
Kenya Airways	Nairobi–Jomo Kenyatta
KLM	Amsterdam
Neos	Seasonal: Milan-Malpensa
Precision Air	Dar-es-Salaam, Mwanza, Nairobi–Jomo Kenyatta
Qatar Airways	Doha
Turkish Airlines	Istanbul
Uganda Airlines	Entebbe

== Accidents and incidents ==
On 18 December 2013, an Ethiopian Airlines Boeing 767 (ET-AQW) flying from Addis Ababa to Kilimanjaro International Airport (runway length 11,811 feet) mistakenly landed at Arusha Municipal Field (runway length 6,102 feet), overrunning the end of the runway
