= Iringa Airport =

Airport in Iringa, Tanzania

Iringa / Nduli Airport Uwanja wa Ndege wa Iringa / Nduli (Swahili)
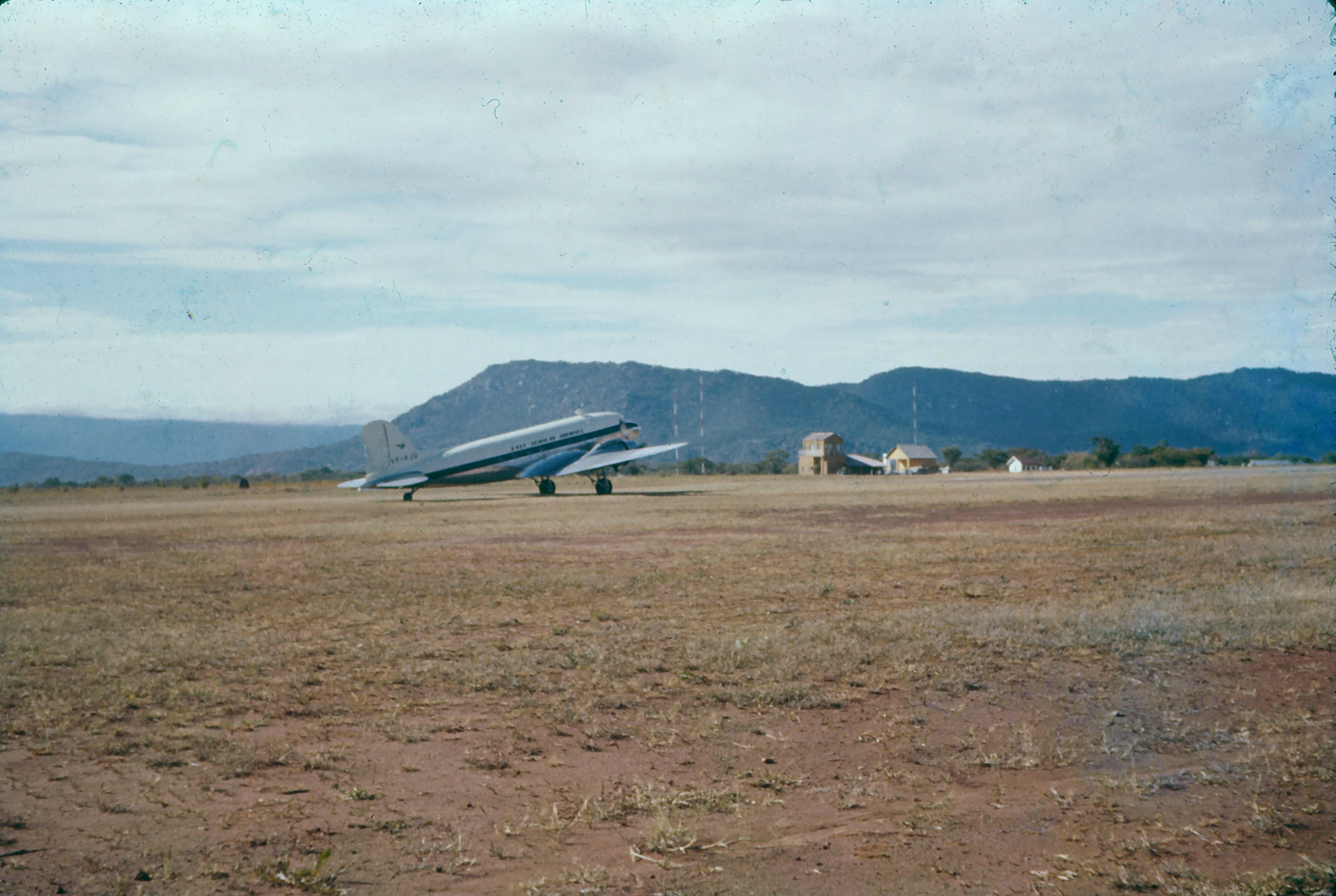
- Aerodrome in 1960s
- IATA: IRI; ICAO: HTIR; WMO: 63887

Summary
- Airport type: Public
- Owner: Government of Tanzania
- Operator: Tanzania Airports Authority
- Serves: Iringa
- Location: Nduli, Tanzania
- Opened: 1982
- Elevation AMSL: 4,678 ft (1,426 m)
- Coordinates: 7°40′10″S 35°45′05″E
- Website: www.taa.go.tz

Map
- Location of airport in Tanzania

Runways
Direction	Length		Surface
Direction	m	ft	Surface
02/20	2,100	6,890	Asphalt
- Sources: TCAA GCM Google Maps

Iringa Airport (IATA: IRI, ICAO: HTIR), also known as Nduli Airport, is an airport in Tanzania serving Iringa and the surrounding Iringa Region. It is 17 kilometres (11 mi) northeast of the municipality. The airport's single asphalt runway lies parallel to the A104 trunk road. The airport was opened in 1982. In 2022, work including a runway expansion and the construction of a new terminal building began. The airport remained operational during construction, and it reopened to large aircraft traffic in 2025.

== History ==
Planning for the airport started in 1950. A paved runway 1,679 m (5,509 ft) long was constructed in 1970–1980, and the airport officially opened in 1982. Its original layout included a terminal building capable of accommodating 100 passengers, a small air traffic control (ATC) tower, and an unpaved car park. The airport also hosted a small firehouse, a helipad, two taxiways, and an apron.

=== Expansion ===
Iringa Airport's runways and facilities were in poor condition and in need of major repair and upgrade. In 2018, it was one of 11 airports whose expansion feasibility studies had been completed.

The project was divided into two construction phases. Under each phase, one side of the original runway remained closed, reducing its effective length to 600 m (2,000 ft). Phase 1 involved the reconstruction of the runway, taxiways, apron, and access road; construction of new security fencing, lighting, and a fire tender house; and installation of a new power supply system. The runway was to be extended to 2,100 m (6,900 ft). Phase 2 involved the construction of a new terminal building, ATC tower, and sewer and drainage system; installation of new equipment; and land scarping.

Phase 1 was funded by the Tanzanian government, while phase 2 was funded by the World Bank through the Tanzania Transport Integration Project. The project cost about TSh 68 billion (US$26 million). The project required the acquisition of 16,466 m^{2} (177,240 ft^{2}) of land, displacing 97 households and economically affecting 137 households. Compensation totalled about TSh 3.3 million (US$1,200).

Construction began on 26 July 2022. During the project, the airport remained operational. A temporary taxiway was set up during phase 2 while part of the runway was under construction. The airport reopened to large aircraft traffic on 22 February 2025.

== Airlines and destinations ==
Airlines	Destinations
Auric Air	Dar es Salaam
Air Tanzania	Dar es Salaam
Precision Air	Dodoma

== See also ==
- List of airports in Tanzania
- Transport in Tanzania
