= Loliondo Airstrip =

Loliondo Airstrip Uwanja mdogo wa Ndege wa Loliondo
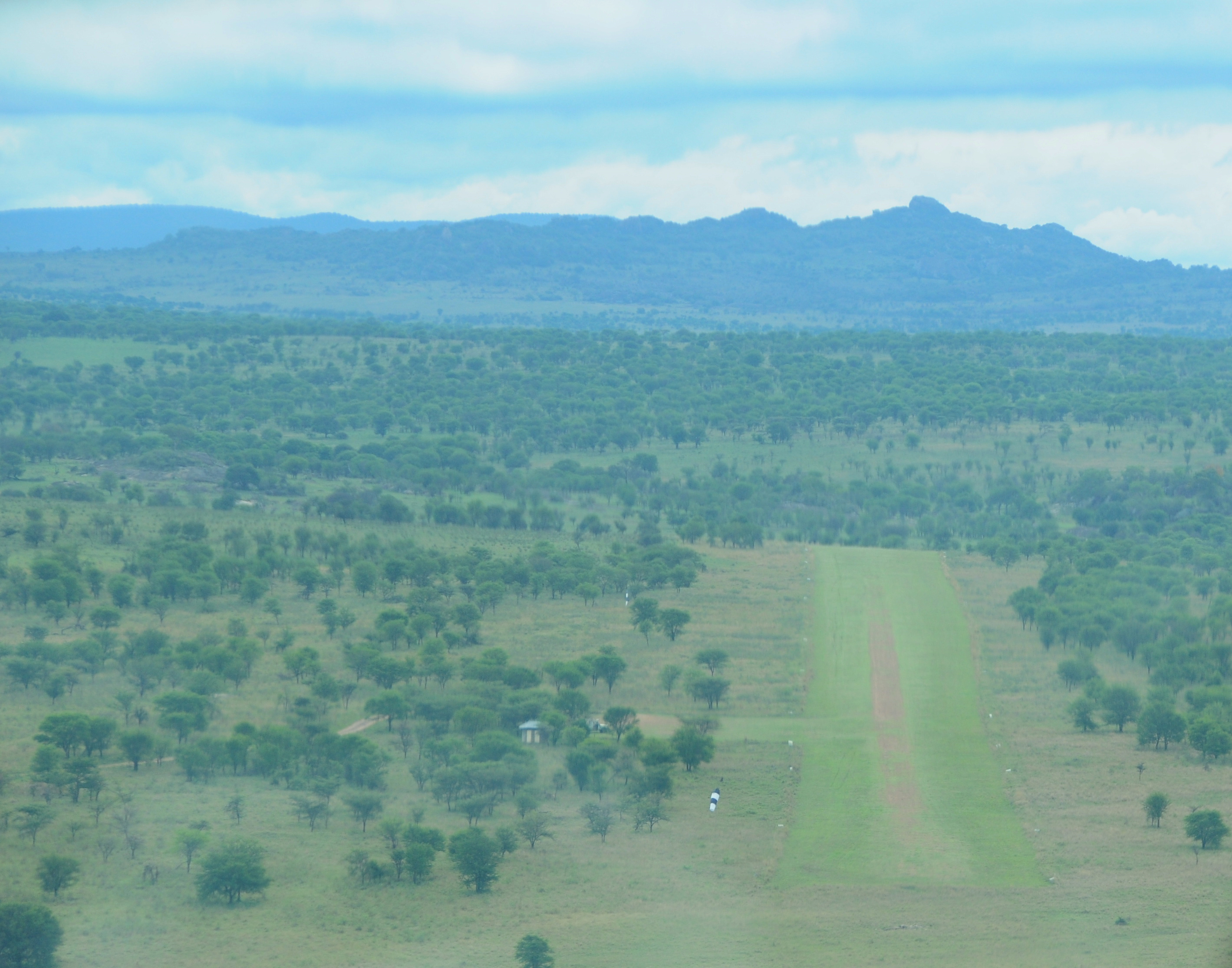
- IATA: none; ICAO: HTLD

Summary
- Airport type: Public
- Owner: Government of Tanzania
- Operator: Tanzania Airports Authority
- Location: Loliondo
- Elevation AMSL: 6,620 ft / 2,018 m
- Coordinates: 2°04′13″S 35°32′25″E
- Website: www.taa.go.tz

Map
- Location of airstrip in Tanzania

Runways
Direction	Length		Surface
Direction	m	ft	Surface
09/27	1,535	5,036	Grass
- Sources: TCAA GCM Google Maps

Loliondo Airstrip (ICAO: HTLD) is an airstrip serving the village of Loliondo, in the Arusha Region of Tanzania.

== See also ==
- List of airports in Tanzania
- Transport in Tanzania
