= Kigoma =

City and lake port in Kigoma Region, Tanzania

- Port city of Kigoma Region
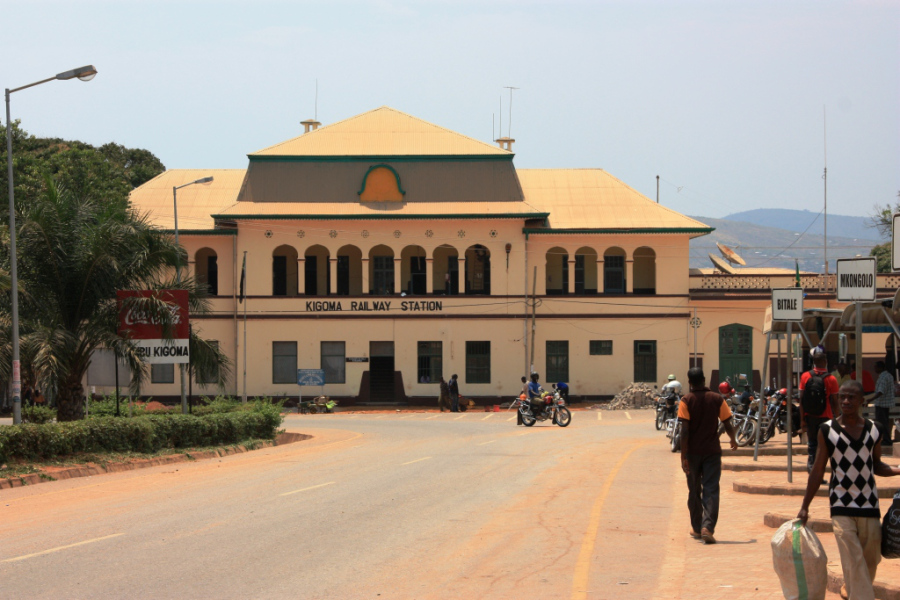
- Kigoma Railway Station

- Location of Kigoma.
- Coordinates: 4°53′S 29°38′E
- Country: Tanzania
- Region: Kigoma Region
- District: Kigoma-Ujiji District

Area
  - Total: 92.67 km^{2} (35.78 sq mi)
- Elevation: 775 m (2,543 ft)

Population (2022 census)
  - Total: 232,388
  - Density: 2,508/km^{2} (6,495/sq mi)
- Time zone: UTC+3 (East Africa Time)
- Area code: 028
- Climate: Aw
- Website: Town website

Kigoma is a city and lake port in Kigoma-Ujiji District in Tanzania, on the northeastern shores of Lake Tanganyika and close to the border with Burundi and The Democratic Republic of the Congo. It serves as the capital for the surrounding Kigoma Region and has a population of 232,388 (2022 census). The city is situated at an elevation of 775 metres (2,543 ft).

The historic trading town of Ujiji is located 6 kilometres (3.7 mi) south-east of Kigoma.

== Transport ==
=== Maritime transport ===
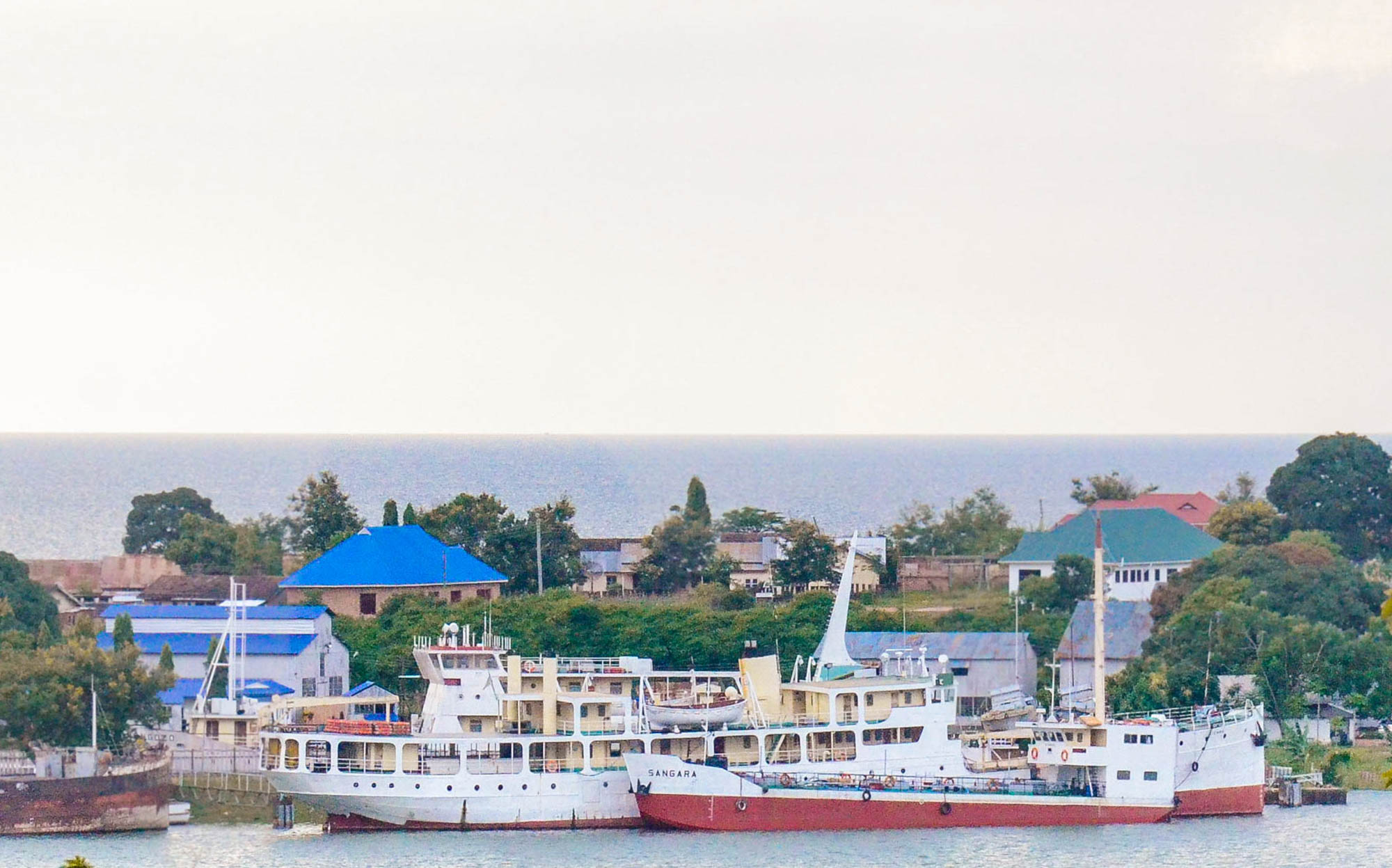
The Kigoma port during the day time.

Kigoma is one of the busiest ports on northeastern Lake Tanganyika since historically it was the only one that had a functioning railway connection (the one at Kalemie in The Democratic Republic of the Congo is not operational at the moment), a direct link to the ocean port at Dar es Salaam. Kigoma Port in the Kigoma Bay has a wharf of two hundred metres (660 ft) and several cranes and is equipped to handle shipping containers. However, the bay is suffering from silting up as a result of soil erosion from surrounding hills, and the water depths at wharfside has diminished from 6 metres (20 ft) to 1.8 metres (5 ft 11 in). This may threaten the economic growth of the port. In May 2007 the Tanzanian Government announced a plan to create an economic zone at the port to stimulate trade and to ensure stable economic growth of the Port for the government in Power in 2015 and 2020.

The MV Liemba sails every week from Kigoma to Mpulungu in Zambia at the southern tip of Lake Tanganyika, stopping at a number of other lakeside towns in Tanzania on the way. The MV Mwongozo sails from Kigoma to Baraka, Uvira and Bujumbura at the northern tip of the lake, although it is not working currently. There are other ships from Congo and Burundi that sail to Kigoma Port every week.

=== Road ===
Current road connections to and from Kigoma are improving. However, travellers should be advised to take extra precautions when travelling. A gravel road links the town northeast to the national road network, and earth tracks link north to Burundi and southeast to Sumbawanga.

=== Railway ===
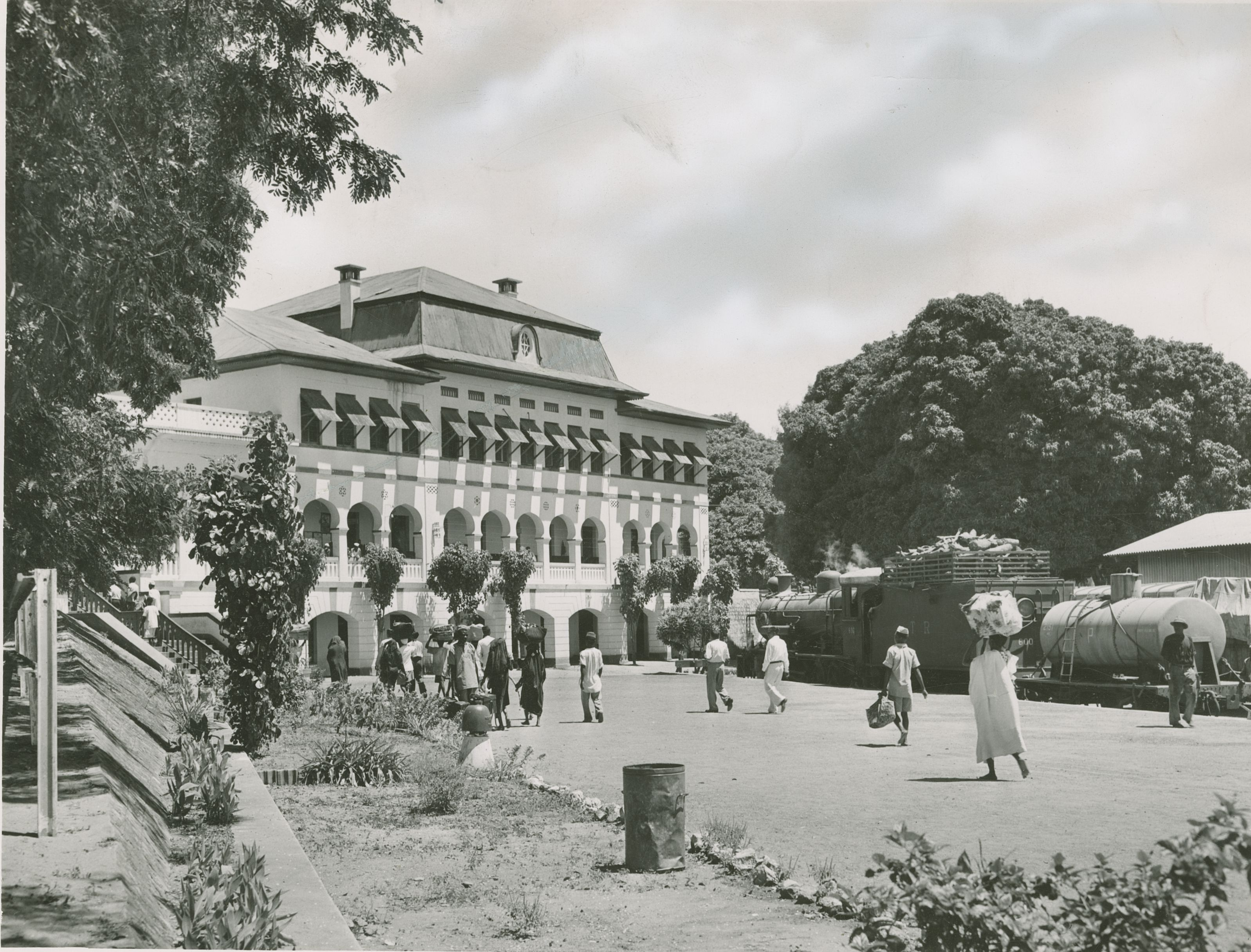
The Kigoma rail station in 1953

The Central Line of the Tanzania Railways Corporation runs from Kigoma to the Port of Dar es Salaam on to the Indian Ocean coast via Tabora and Dodoma. It was completed in 1915 when Kigoma was part of German East Africa. In Tabora, there is a connection to Mwanza on Lake Victoria, with ferry connections to other Tanzanian lakeshore places, and formerly Uganda. At Tabora, you can also travel by train to Mpanda. For a time in early 2010, the line was closed but service has apparently been restored.

=== Airport ===
The city is served by Kigoma Airport which has scheduled service to Bujumbura and Dar es Salaam.

== Climate ==
Kigoma has a tropical savanna climate (Köppen Aw) with a wet season between November and April.

Climate data for Kigoma (1991–2020)
Month	Jan	Feb	Mar	Apr	May	Jun	Jul	Aug	Sep	Oct	Nov	Dec	Year
Mean daily maximum °C (°F)	28.1 (82.6)	28.8 (83.8)	28.7 (83.7)	29.1 (84.4)	29.6 (85.3)	29.5 (85.1)	29.5 (85.1)	30.5 (86.9)	31.1 (88.0)	29.9 (85.8)	28.0 (82.4)	27.7 (81.9)	29.2 (84.6)
Mean daily minimum °C (°F)	19.8 (67.6)	19.9 (67.8)	19.8 (67.6)	19.8 (67.6)	19.1 (66.4)	17.2 (63.0)	16.3 (61.3)	17.4 (63.3)	19.1 (66.4)	20.0 (68.0)	19.9 (67.8)	19.8 (67.6)	19.0 (66.2)
Average rainfall mm (inches)	127.0 (5.00)	91.8 (3.61)	149.5 (5.89)	119.2 (4.69)	40.8 (1.61)	6.0 (0.24)	1.7 (0.07)	4.4 (0.17)	21.8 (0.86)	75.1 (2.96)	151.8 (5.98)	143.8 (5.66)	932.9 (36.73)
Average rainy days (≥ 1.0 mm)	11.1	8.6	12.5	10.3	3.6	0.9	0.1	0.6	2.3	8.1	13.2	13.2	84.5
Source: NOAA
