= Mtwara Airport =

Mtwara Airport Uwanja wa Ndege wa Mtwara (Swahili)
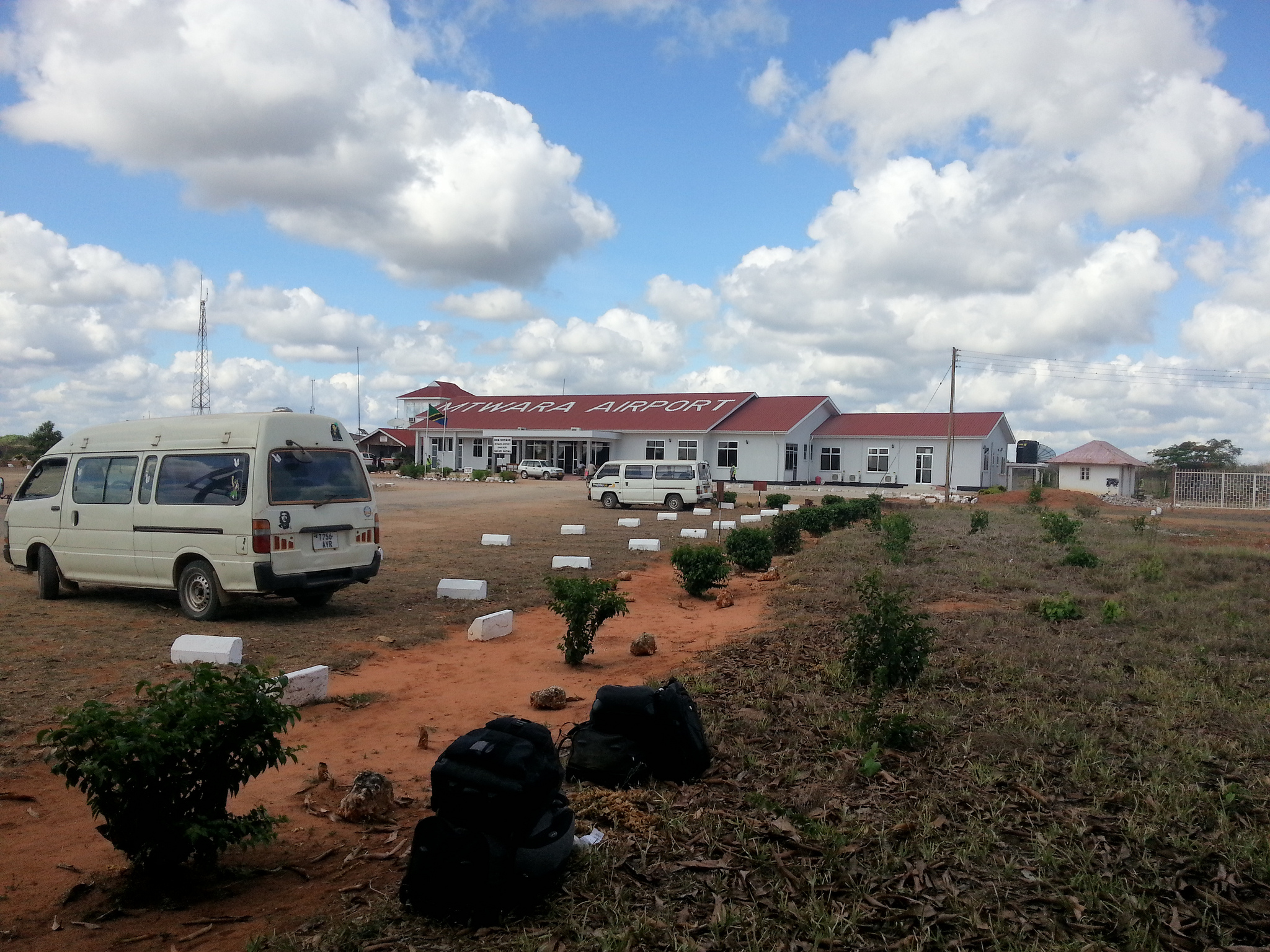
- IATA: MYW; ICAO: HTMT; WMO: 63971

Summary
- Airport type: Public
- Owner: Government of Tanzania
- Operator: Tanzania Airports Authority
- Location: Mtwara, Tanzania
- Focus city for: Mtwara
- Elevation AMSL: 371 ft (113 m)
- Coordinates: 10°20′10″S 40°10′55″E
- Website: www.taa.go.tz

Map
- Location of airport in Tanzania

Runways
Direction	Length		Surface
Direction	m	ft	Surface
01/19	2,259	7,411	Asphalt
08/26	1,173	3,848	Gravel

Statistics (2024)
- Passengers: 16,598
- Aircraft movements: 501
- Cargo (tonnes): 151
- Sources: TAA TCAA

Mtwara Airport (IATA: MYW, ICAO: HTMT) is an airport in southern Tanzania serving the town of Mtwara.

== Location ==
The airport is located in Mtwara Region, approximately 8 kilometres (5.0 mi), by road, south of the town of Mtwara. This is approximately 568 kilometres (353 mi), by road and 400 kilometres (249 mi), by air, south of Julius Nyerere International Airport, the largest airport in Tanzania. The coordinates of Mtwara Airport are 10°20'10.0"S, 40°10'55.0"E (Latitude:-10.336111; Longitude:40.181944).

== Overview ==
The Mtwara non-directional beacon (Ident: MT) is located on the field. The airport lies at an average elevation of 371 feet (113 m) above sea level. The airport has two runways, the longest of which is asphalt surfaced and measures 7,410 feet (2,259 m) long and 98 feet (30 m) wide.

== Airlines and destinations ==
Airlines	Destinations
Air Tanzania	Dar es Salaam
Precision Air	Dar es Salaam

== Accidents and incidents ==
- 27 August 1975: Douglas C-47B 5Y-AAF of East African Airways was damaged beyond economic repair in a landing accident. The aircraft was on a scheduled passenger flight. All 19 people on board survived.

== See also ==
- List of airports in Tanzania
- Transport in Tanzania
