= Julius Nyerere International Airport =

International airport in Dar es Salaam, Tanzania

Julius Nyerere International Airport Uwanja wa Ndege wa Kimataifa wa Julius Nyerere (Swahili)
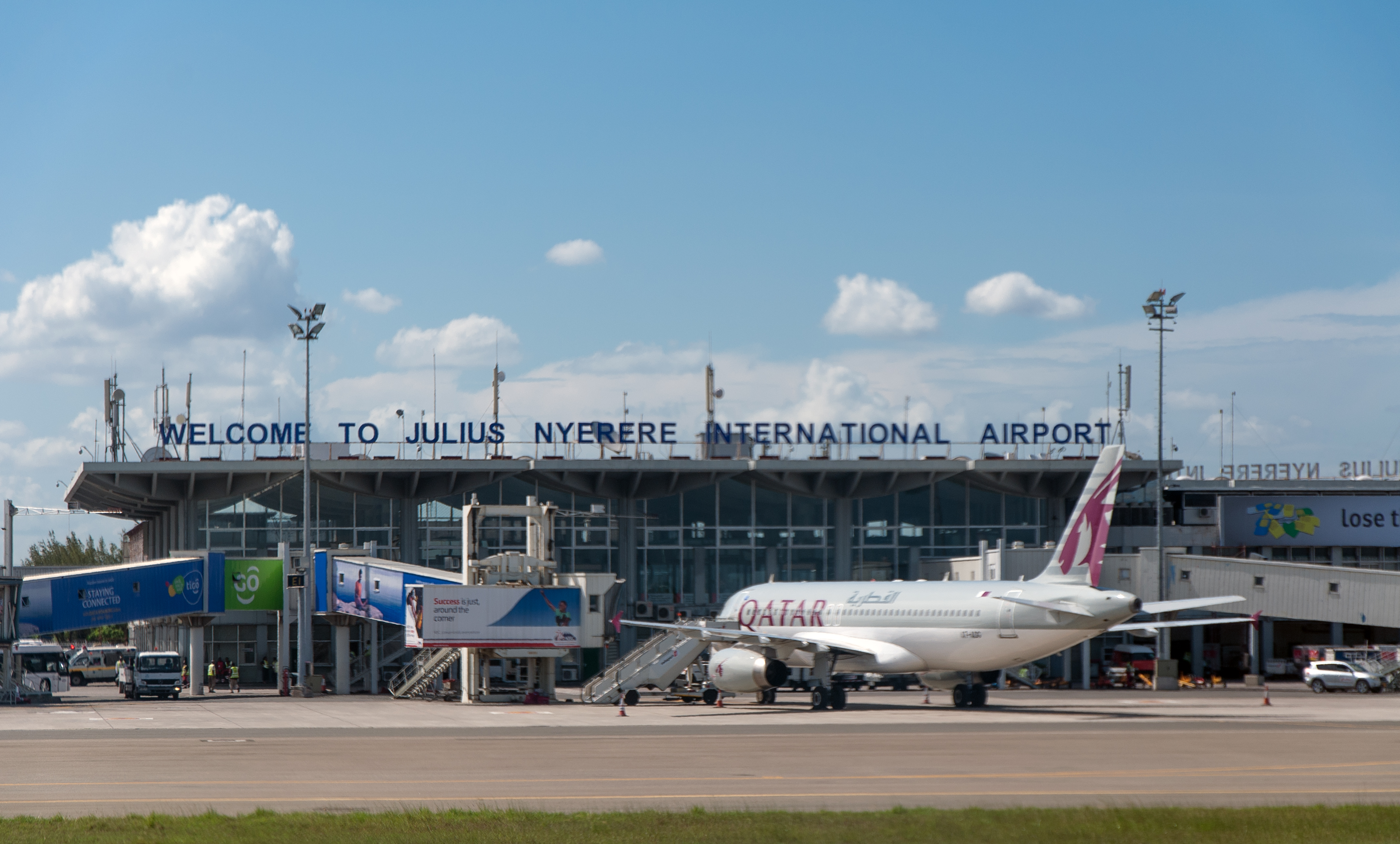
- Airside view of Terminal II
- IATA: DAR; ICAO: HTDA; WMO: 63894

Summary
- Airport type: Public
- Operator: Tanzania Airports Authority
- Location: Dar es Salaam, Tanzania
- Opened: October 1954
- Hub for: Air Tanzania; Precision Air
- Time zone: EAT (UTC+03:00)
- Elevation AMSL: 55 m (180 ft)
- Coordinates: 06°52′41″S 39°12′10″E
- Website: www.jnia.taa.go.tz

Map
- Location within Tanzania Location within Africa Location within Earth

Runways
Direction	Length		Surface
Direction	m	ft	Surface
05/23	3,000	9,843	Asphalt
14/32	1,000	3,281	Asphalt

Statistics (2024)
- Passengers: 2,887,382
- Aircraft movements: 58,000
- Cargo (tonnes): 29,088
- Land area: 1,700 ha (4,200 acres)
- Source: TAA

Julius Nyerere International Airport (IATA: DAR, ICAO: HTDA) is the international airport of Dar es Salaam, the largest city in Tanzania. It is located in Kipawa ward of Ilala District in Dar es Salaam Region of Tanzania. The airport has flights to destinations in Africa, Asia, Europe, and the Middle East. It is named after Julius Nyerere (1922–1999), the nation's first president.

== History ==
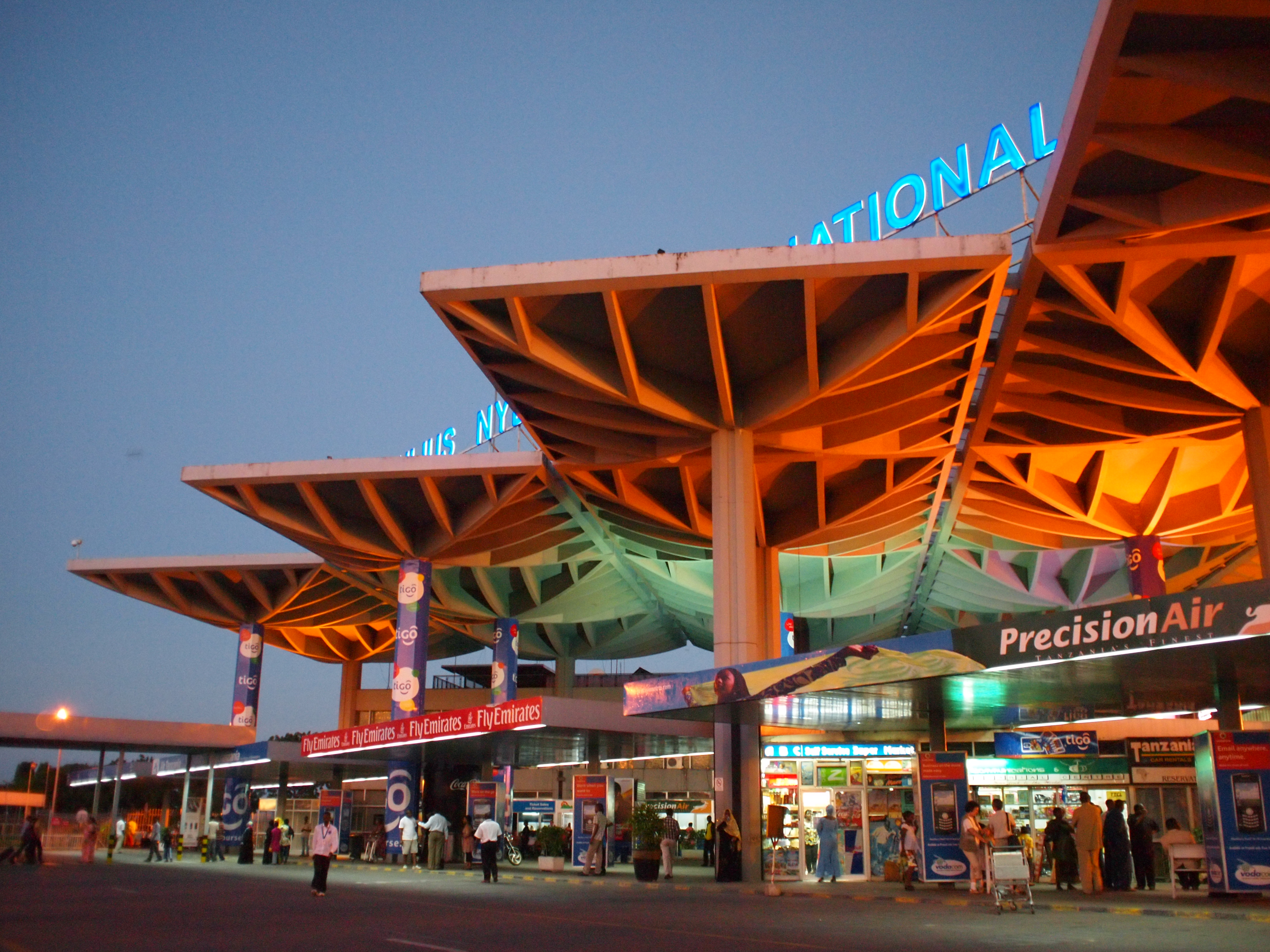
The reinforced concrete roofs at Terminal II are designed to resemble a forest canopy.

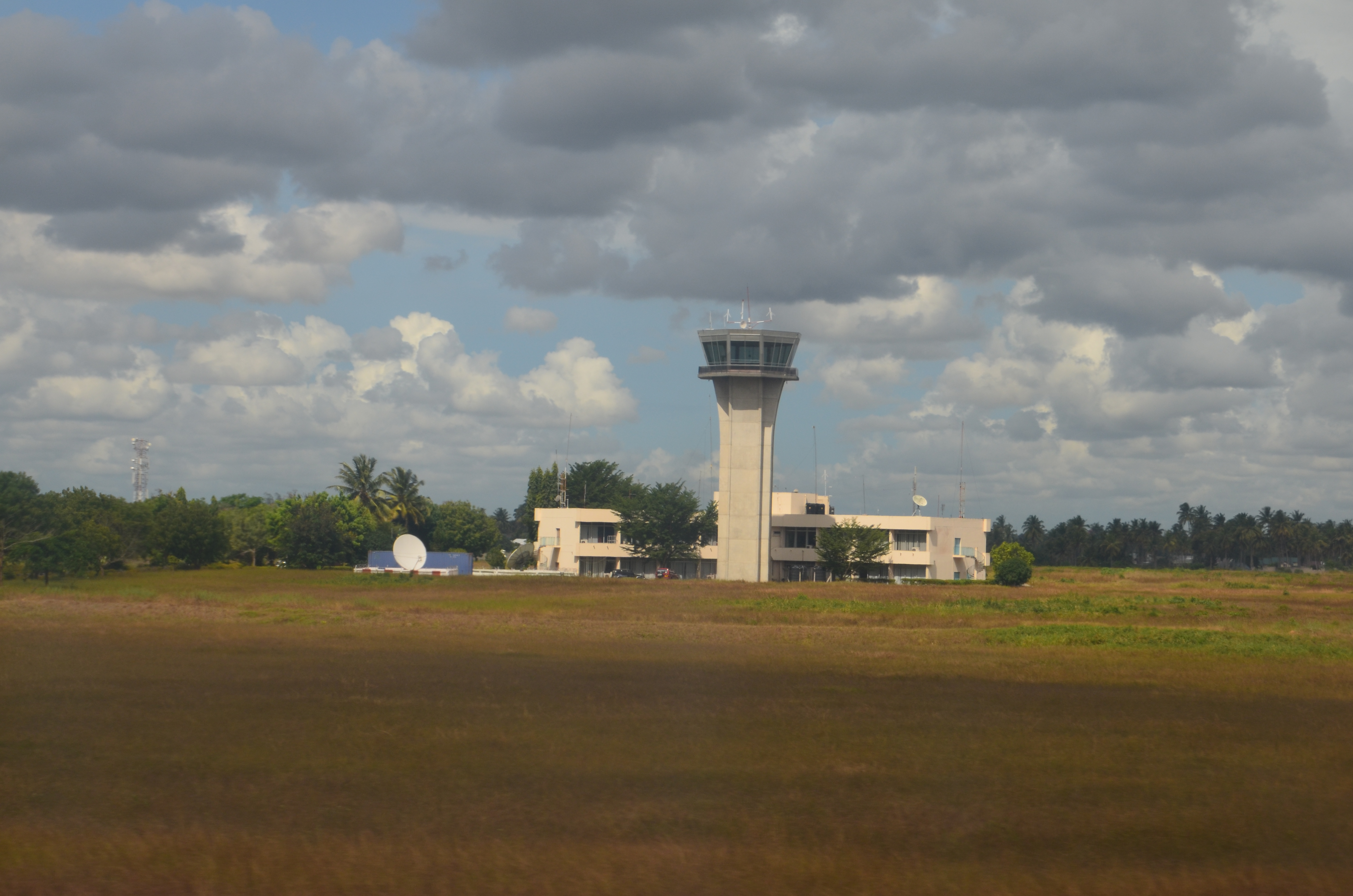
Air traffic control tower

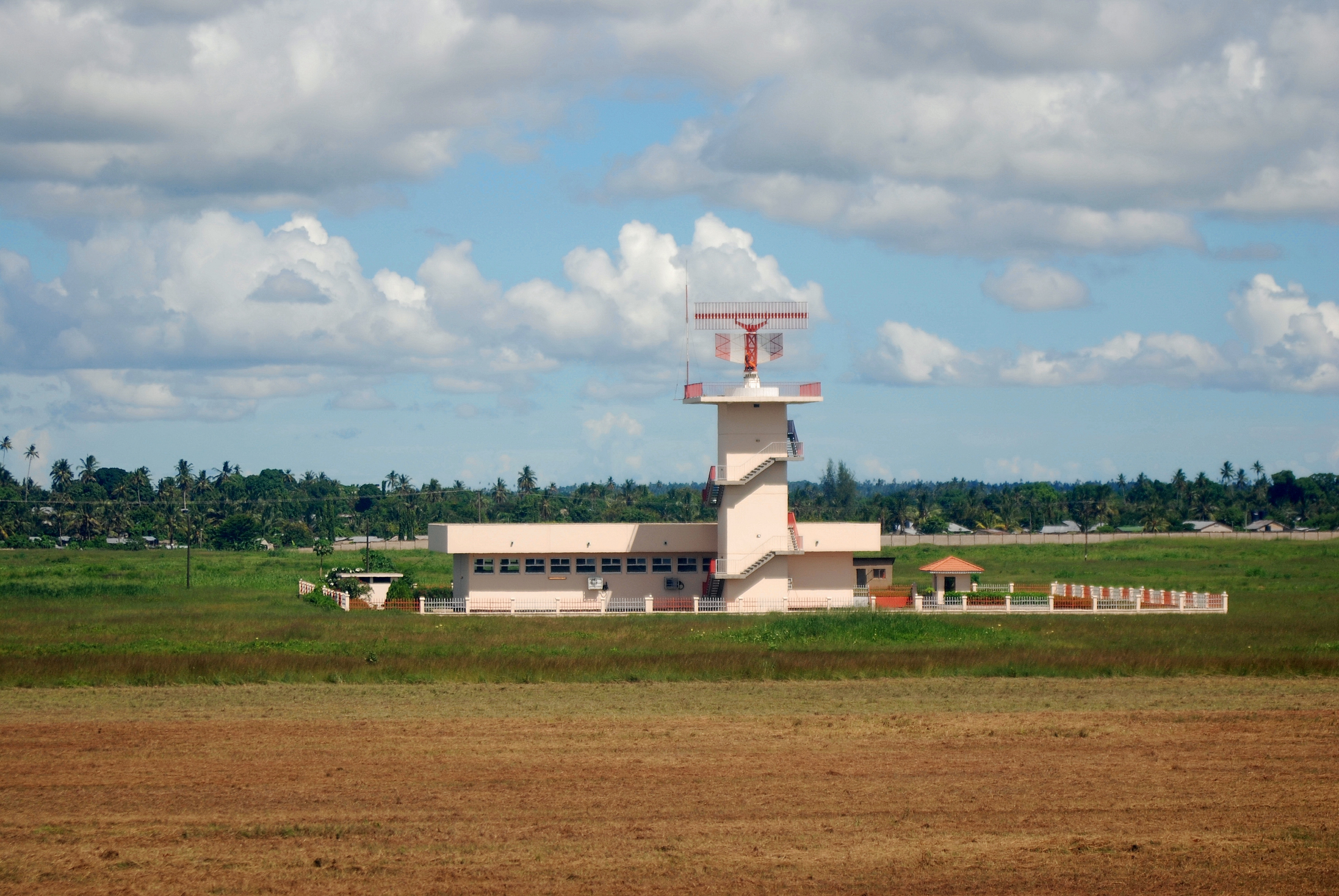
Radar tower

In October 2005, "Dar es Salaam International Airport" (DIA) was renamed "Mwalimu Julius Kambarage Nyerere International Airport" and on 1 November 2006, "Julius Nyerere International Airport". A total of 9,501,265 passengers used the airport from 1980 to 2004, averaging 2,770 per day.

In April 2013, the Tanzania Airports Authority signed a TSH 275 billion contract with BAM International of the Netherlands for the construction of the first phase of Terminal III, with a capacity of 3.5 million passengers per year. In November 2015, the second phase was also awarded to BAM, at a contract price of US$110 million, and will add capacity for an additional 2.5 million passengers per year. After completion of Terminal III, it is expected that Terminal II will be devoted only to domestic passengers. It is proposed to build a rail shuttle link from the airport to the city, and rail coaches had been bought, as of 2014.

The new Terminal 3 was constructed using domestic funding, and started operations in August 2019. In October 2022, it was announced that Terminal 2 was ready to be renovated soon by the Government of Tanzania. In February 2022, Tanzania Airports Authority announced their plans of developing a four-star hotel and commercial complex at Julius Nyerere International Airport (JNIA).

== Terminals ==
There are three terminals at Dar es Salaam airport.

Terminal 1 mainly used for private, charter, and small aircraft flights. In January 2026, a new VIP terminal was mainly built to serve high-profile and state passengers.

Terminal 2 is used for domestic and regional scheduled flights. It has a capacity of handling 1.5 million passengers. In 2024, it was announced that the terminal is set for major renovation, with plans to transform it into a modern national hub for Air Tanzania capable of handling traffic of up to 3.5 million passengers.

Terminal 3 is the newest terminal that opened in August 2019. It is used for International flights. The terminal consists of two phases, Phase I and II. There are 58 businesses in the terminal categorized under retail, operational machines and provision of services.

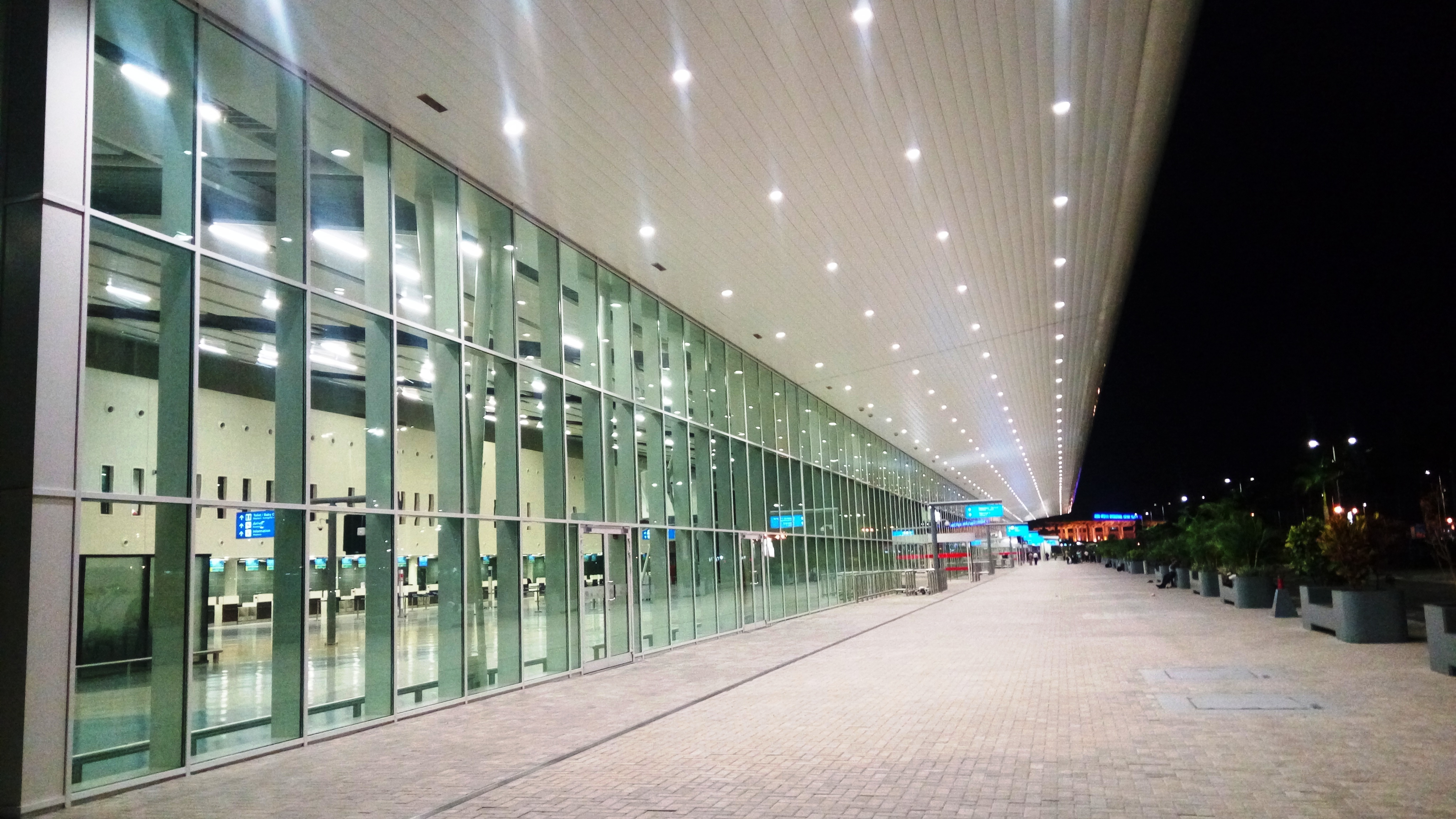
Julius Nyerere International Airport Terminal III at night - November 2019

== Airlines and destinations ==
=== Passenger ===
The following passenger airlines operate at the airport:

Airlines	Destinations
Air Tanzania	Accra, Arusha, Bujumbura, Bukoba, Cape Town, Dodoma–City, Dodoma–Msalato, Dubai-International, Entebbe, Geita–Chato, Guangzhou, Harare, Iringa, Johannesburg–O. R. Tambo, Kigoma, Kilimanjaro, London–Gatwick (begins 1 July 2027), Kinshasa–N'djili, Lagos, Lubumbashi, Lusaka, Mbeya, Mahé, Moroni, Moscow–Vnukov, Mpanda, Mtwara, Mumbai–Shivaji, Muscat, Mwanza, Nairobi–Jomo Kenyatta, Ndola, Pemba Island, Songea, Sumbawanga, Tabora, Victoria Falls, Zanzibar
Air Zimbabwe	Harare
Airlink	Johannesburg–O. R. Tambo
Auric Air	Iringa, Mafia Island, Mwanza, Pemba Island, Tanga, Zanzibar
Coastal Air	Mafia Island, Pemba Island, Tanga Zanzibar
Egyptair	Cairo
Emirates	Dubai–International
Ethiopian Airlines	Addis Ababa
Ewa Air	Mayotte
Flightlink	Arusha, Mwanza, Zanzibar
flydubai	Dubai–International
IndiGo	Mumbai (begins 20 November 2026)
Kenya Airways	Nairobi–Jomo Kenyatta
KLM	Amsterdam
LAM Mozambique Airlines	Maputo, Pemba
Malawi Airlines	Blantyre, Lilongwe
Oman Air	Muscat
Precision Air	Arusha, Kahama, Kilimanjaro, Mtwara, Mwanza, Nairobi–Jomo Kenyatta, Zanzibar
Qatar Airways	Doha
RwandAir	Kigali
Skyward Airlines	Mombasa, Nairobi–Jomo Kenyatta
South African Airways	Johannesburg–O. R. Tambo
Turkish Airlines	Istanbul
Uganda Airlines	Entebbe
Zambia Airways	Lusaka

=== Cargo ===
Airlines	Destinations
Air Tanzania	Dubai–International, Kinshasa–N'djili, Lubumbashi, Mumbai
Astral Aviation	Nairobi–Jomo Kenyatta
Kenya Airways Cargo	Nairobi–Jomo Kenyatta

== Statistics ==
Traffic figures
	1999	2000	2001	2002	2003	2004	2005
Aircraft movements	21,879	31,539	32,074	37,035	44,289	49,523	50,604
Number of passengers	586,325	621,513	652,002	703,483	822,398	1,011,392	1,124,235
Total cargo (metric tons)	11,567	14,618	14,467	12,552	12,338	17,863	15,575
	2006	2007	2008	2009	2010	2011	2012
Aircraft movements	53,218	55,938	61,954	57,790	62,620	70,460	75,564
Number of passengers	1,249,419	1,450,558	1,542,778	1,422,846	1,556,410	1,829,219	2,088,282
Total cargo (metric tons)	15,617	18,456	23,039	18,844	19,675	23,946	25,412
	2013	2014	2015	2016	2017	2018	2019
Aircraft movements	77,185	77,990	75,240	75,749	74,286	71,420	69,970
Number of passengers	2,348,819	2,478,055	2,496,394	2,469,356	2,385,456	2,417,090	2,390,265
Total cargo (metric tons)	21,891	21,255	22,014	17,398	17,031	16,162	15,898

== Accidents and incidents ==
- On 3 January 1950, a United Air Services flight, flying an Avro Anson C.19 with registration VP-TAT, crash-landed at Dar es Salaam International Airport, killing both crew members.
- On 18 May 1989, an Aeroflot flight flying an Ilyushin 62 was hijacked by a South African after the plane took off from Luanda, Angola. The hijacker was armed with a grenade and attempted to hold hostage the occupants of the plane that carried members of the African National Congress. The hijacker was shot by a security guard as he attempted to enter the cockpit. The plane continued its scheduled stop at Dar es Salaam International Airport.
- On 11 April 2014, Kenya Airways flight KQ-482 flying an Embraer ERJ-190AR had an accident upon landing in heavy rains. The plane veered off the runway. All passengers and crew were evacuated. There were no reported fatalities, and three passengers sustained minor injuries.
