= Kahama Airstrip =

Kahama Airstrip Uwanja wa Ndege wa Kahama
- IATA: KBH; ICAO: none

Summary
- Airport type: Private
- Owner: Acacia Mining
- Operator: Buzwagi Gold Mine
- Serves: Kahama
- Location: Kahama, Tanzania
- Elevation AMSL: 3,980 ft (1,210 m)
- Coordinates: 3°50.82′0″S 32°41.19′0″E

Map
- Location of airstrip in Tanzania Kahama (Africa)

Runways
Direction	Length		Surface
Direction	m	ft	Surface
29/11	1,288	4,228	Asphalt
- Sources: TCAA Soil Solutions

The Kahama Airstrip is an airstrip operated by Buzwagi Gold Mine. The airport is located in Kahama in the Shinyanga Region. The airport is currently used for mine operations and is used by charter companies, however, Precision Air plans to begin scheduled service to Kahama soon.

== Airlines and destinations ==
Airlines	Destinations
Precision Air	Dar es Salaam
