= Songwe Airport =

Regional airport in Mbeya region, Tanzania

Songwe Airport Uwanja wa Ndege wa Songwe (Swahili)
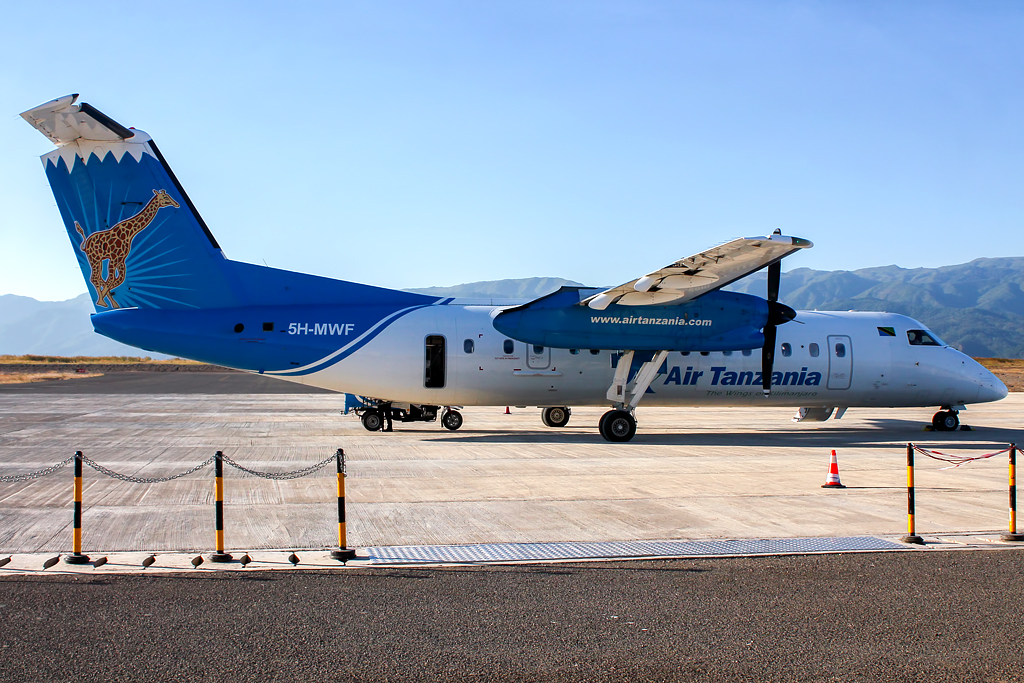
- An Air Tanzania DHC-8-300 at the airport.
- IATA: none; ICAO: HTGW

Summary
- Airport type: Public
- Owner: Government of Tanzania
- Operator: Tanzania Airports Authority
- Serves: Mbeya, Tanzania
- Location: Mbeya Region
- Elevation AMSL: 4,412 ft / 1,345 m
- Coordinates: 8°55′10″S 33°16′25″E
- Website: www.taa.go.tz

Map
- Location of airport in Tanzania HTGW (Africa)

Runways
Direction	Length		Surface
Direction	m	ft	Surface
09/27	3,330	10,925	Asphalt

Statistics (2024)
- Passengers: 102,431
- Aircraft movements: 1,537
- Cargo (tonnes): 1,013
- Source: TAA

Songwe Airport (ICAO: HTGW), usually referred to in flight schedules as Mbeya (using the "MBI" IATA code from the unpaved Mbeya Airport), is an airport located in the southern highland region of Mbeya Region, Tanzania, serving the city of Mbeya. it is the largest Airport in southwest Tanzania. Also, due to its proximity to the regional border, it serves the Songwe Region as well. It is 20 kilometres (12 mi) west of the city, off the A104 trunk road, and is able to accommodate commercial jet traffic, whereas the unpaved Mbeya Airport is not.

The Songwe non-directional beacon (Ident: SW) is located 4.8 nautical miles (8.9 km) off the threshold of runway 28.

== History ==
Redevelopment of Songwe Airport began in 2001. The Tanzania Civil Aviation Authority issued a NOTAM on 12 December 2012 saying "WEF 13 DEC 2012 new airport called Songwe opened and operational."

== Airlines and destinations ==
Airlines	Destinations
Air Tanzania	Dar es Salaam
Precision Air	Dar es Salaam

== Scheduled flights ==
In the past, regular services have been provided by Air Tanzania, Tropical Air, Auric Air, Fastjet Tanzania, and Precision Air; but, apart from Air Tanzania, these airlines have discontinued their scheduled services; charter flights can still be arranged with Tropical Air and Auric Air.

== See also ==
- List of airports in Tanzania
- Transport in Tanzania
