= Kigoma Airport =

Kigoma Airport Uwanja wa Ndege wa Kigoma (Swahili)
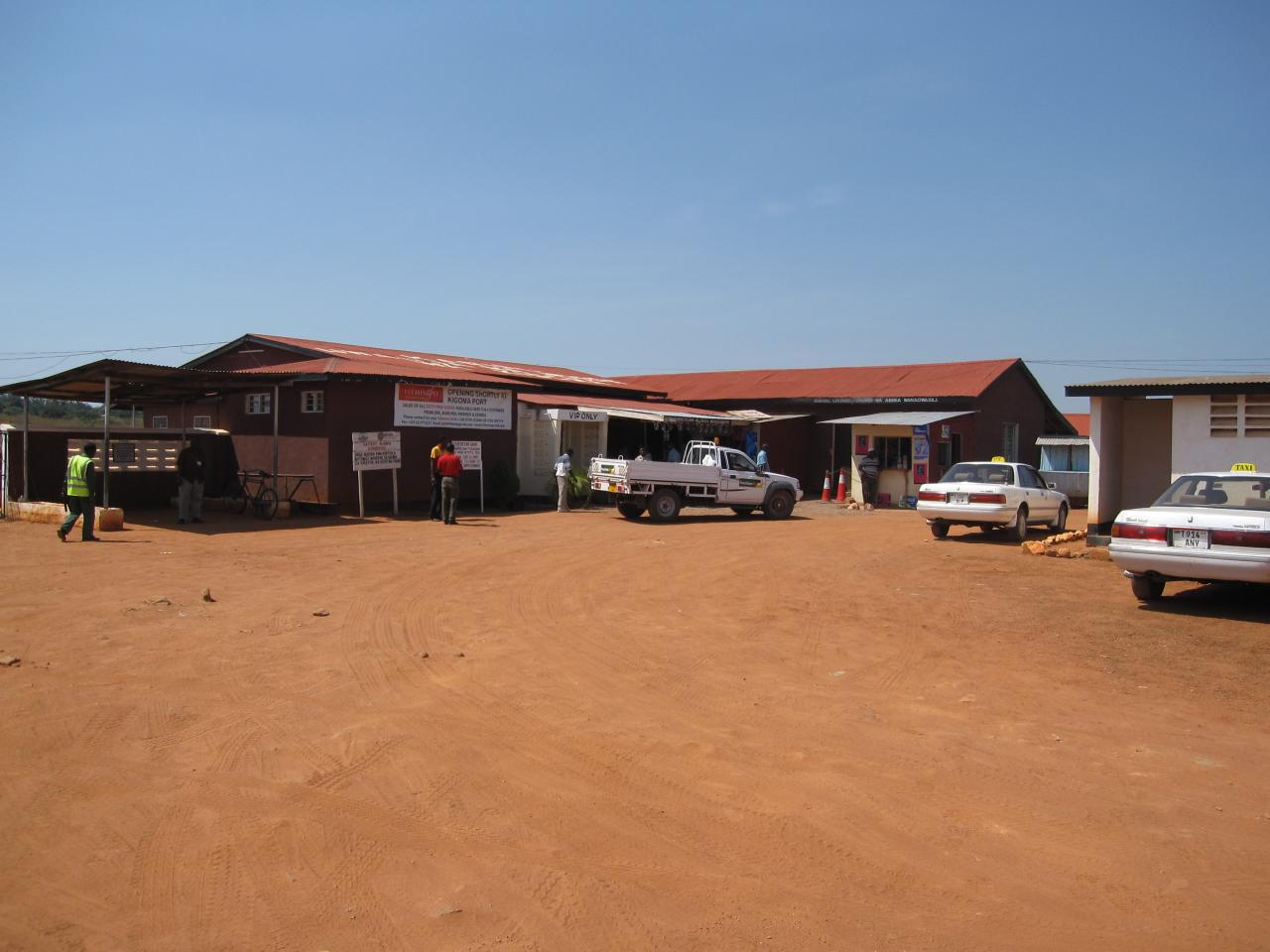
- IATA: TKQ; ICAO: HTKA; WMO: 63801

Summary
- Airport type: Public
- Owner: Government of Tanzania
- Operator: Tanzania Airports Authority
- Serves: Kigoma
- Location: Ujiji, Tanzania
- Elevation AMSL: 2,700 ft / 823 m
- Coordinates: 4°53′10″S 29°40′15″E
- Website: www.taa.go.tz

Map
- Location of Kigoma airport.

Runways
Direction	Length		Surface
Direction	m	ft	Surface
15/33	1,805	5,922	Asphalt

Statistics (2024)
- Passengers: 45,338
- Aircraft movements: 1,184
- Cargo (tonnes): 41
- Sources: TAA GCM Google Maps

Kigoma Airport (IATA: TKQ, ICAO: HTKA) is an airport in western Tanzania serving Kigoma. It is located at the east area of Ujiji. The government of Tanzania is planning to improve the airport. The Kigoma non-directional beacon (Ident: KG) is located on the field. Ground handling at the airport is conducted by the Livingstone Aviation Services Limited.

== Airlines and destinations ==
Airlines	Destinations
Air Tanzania	Dar es Salaam

== Gallery ==
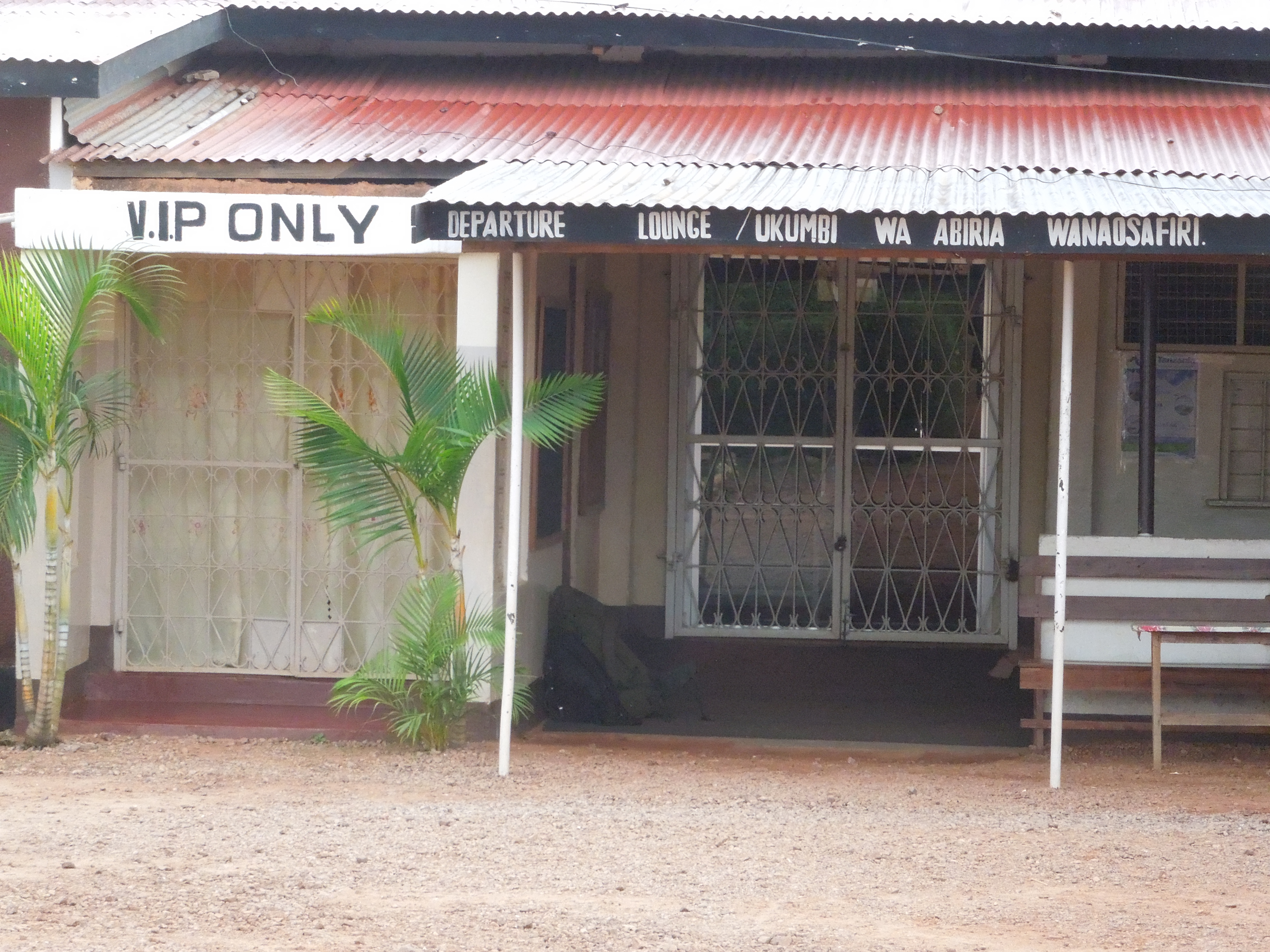
The VIP and the Departures terminal.

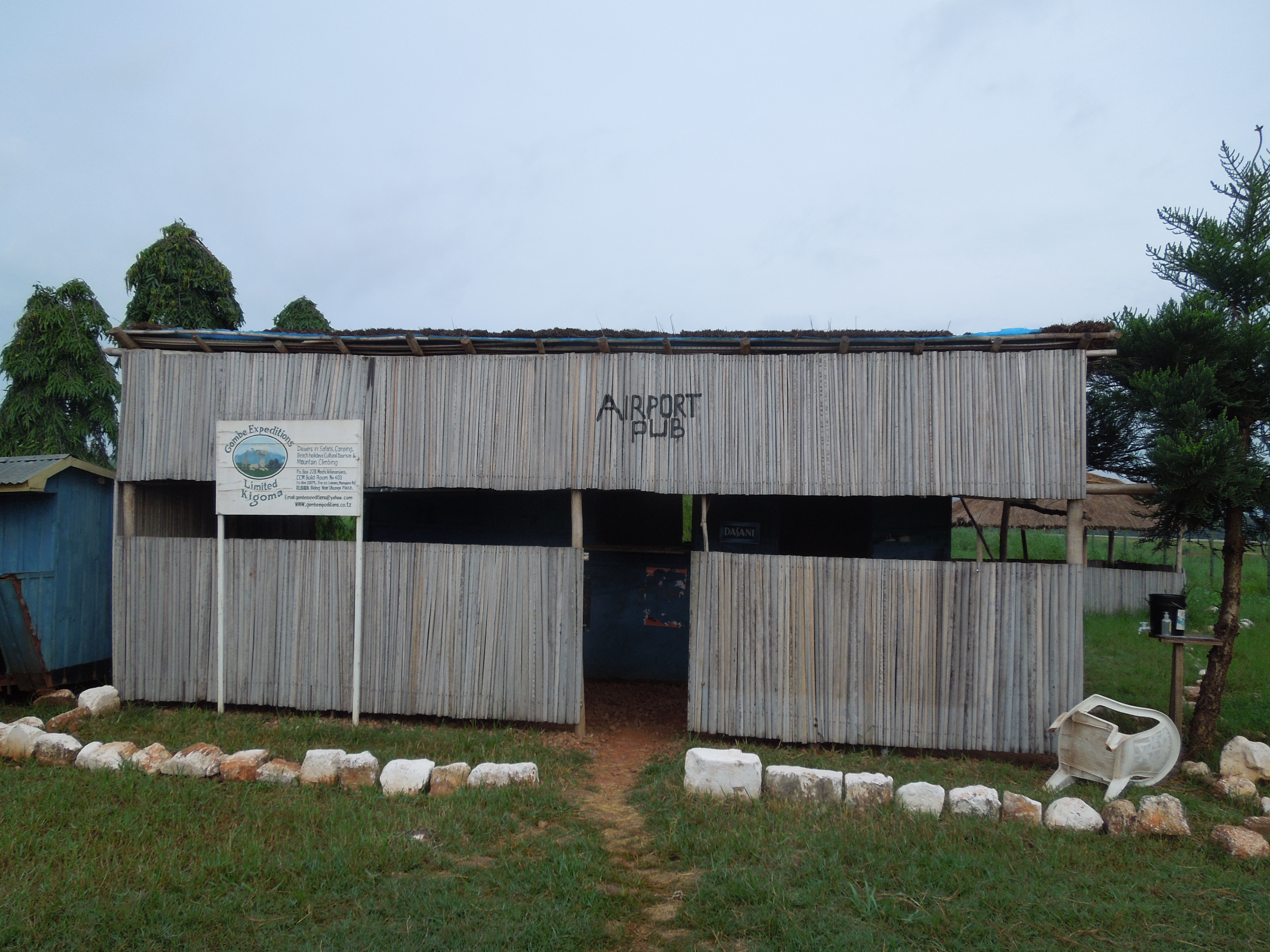
The airport pub.

== Accidents and incidents ==
- 9 April 2012: Air Tanzania de Havilland Canada Dash 8-300 5H-MWG was written off after an aborted take off. All 39 people on board survived.

== See also ==
- List of airports in Tanzania
- Transport in Tanzania
