= Kahama, Tanzania =

Kahama
- Town
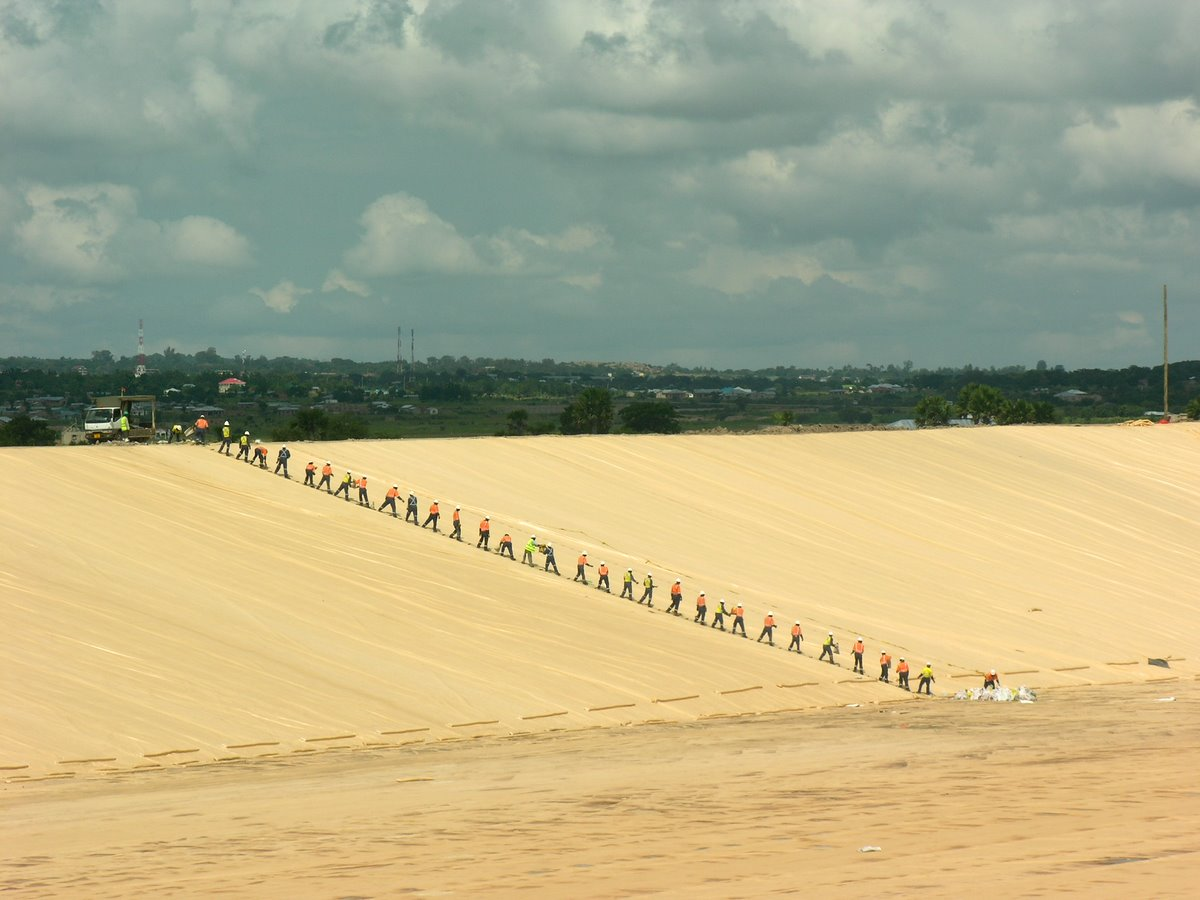
- The Buzwagi Gold Mine, located in the eastern suburb of Kahama.

- Location in Tanzania
- Coordinates: 03°50′15″S 32°36′00″E
- Country: Tanzania
- Region: Shinyanga Region
- District: Kahama

Government
  - Type: Municipal council

Population (2022 Census)
  - Total: 453,654
- Time zone: GMT + 3
- Website: Country website

Kahama is a town in north-western Tanzania. The town serves as the headquarters of Kahama Urban District.

== Geography ==
Kahama is located in the Kahama District of the Shinyanga Region, approximately 109 kilometres (68 mi), by road, south-west of Shinyanga where the regional headquarters are located. The town is approximately 536 kilometres (333 mi), by road, north-west of Dodoma, the capital of Tanzania.

== Population ==
As of August 2022, the population of Kahama was 453,654.

== Places of interest ==
The following nine places of interest are in or near the town:

1. Headquarters of Kahama District Administration
2. Offices of Kahama Town Council
3. Kahama Central Market
4. Buzwagi Gold Mine
5. Kahama Mining Corporation Limited - an underground gold mine operated by Barrick Gold, a Canadian mining company
6. Kahama General Hospital
7. Kahama Airstrip
8. Dodoma-Bukoba highway
9. Northern Kahama Game Reserve - about 40 kilometres (25 mi), by road, north of Kahama
