= PSRC =

PSRC may refer to:

- Parastatal Sector Reform Commission, a part of the Tanzanian government
- Puget Sound Regional Council, a regional planning organization in the U.S. state of Washington
- Revolutionary Socialist Party (Colombia), defunct Colombian political party (1926-1930)
