= Bukoba Airport =

Airport in Kagera Region, Tanzania

Bukoba Airport Uwanja wa Ndege wa Bukoba (Swahili)
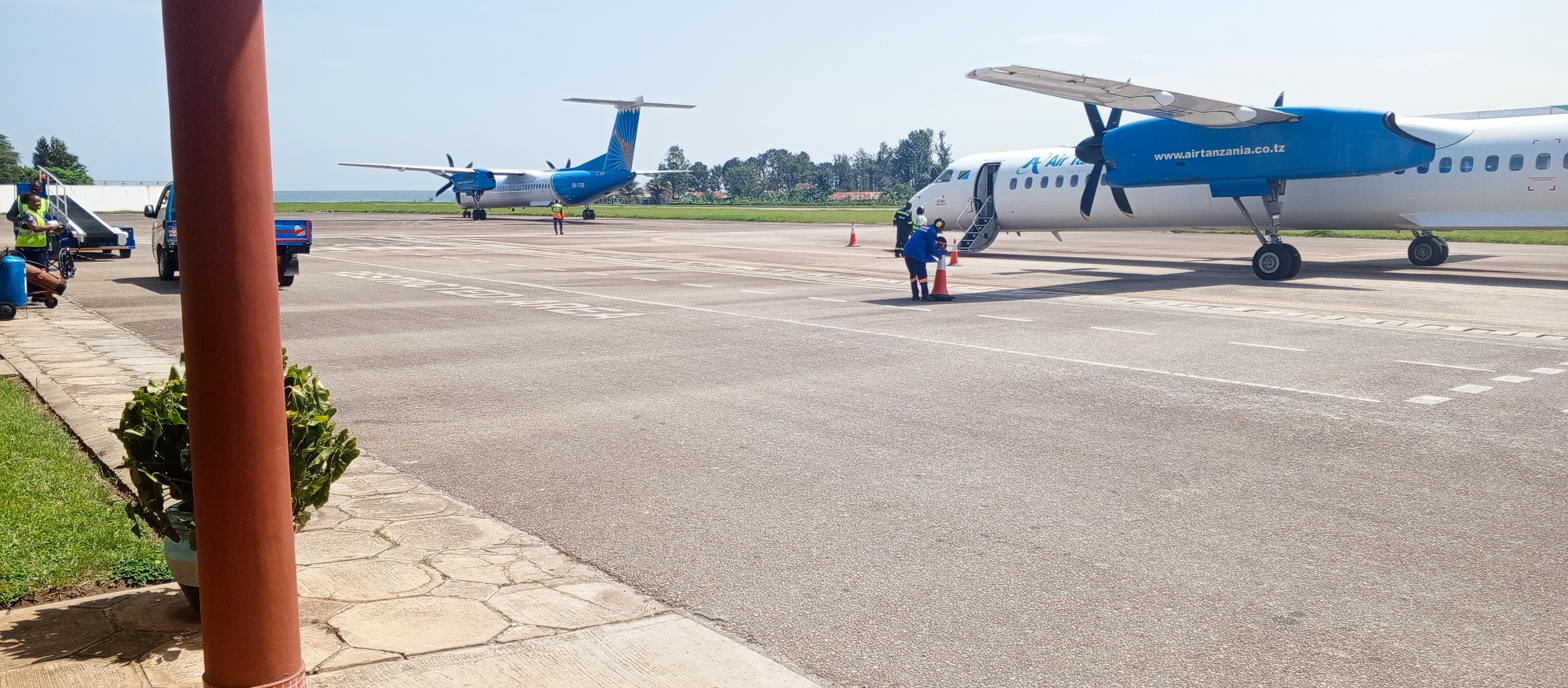
- The airport in 2025
- IATA: BKZ; ICAO: HTBU; WMO: 63729

Summary
- Airport type: Public
- Owner: Government of Tanzania
- Operator: Tanzania Airports Authority
- Serves: Bukoba, Tanzania
- Location: Sokoine Road, Bukoba, Kagera Region, Tanzania
- Elevation AMSL: 3,766 ft / 1,148 m
- Coordinates: 1°19′50″S 31°49′10″E
- Website: www.taa.go.tz

Map
- Location of Bukoba airport.

Runways
Direction	Length		Surface
Direction	m	ft	Surface
13/31	1,600	5,249	Asphalt

Statistics (2024)
- Passengers: 44,259
- Aircraft movements: 1,146
- Cargo (tonnes): 31
- Sources: TAA TCAA Google Maps GCM

Bukoba Airport (IATA: BKZ, ICAO: HTBU) is a domestic airport located in the city of Bukoba, the capital of the Kagera Region in northwest Tanzania. It lies about 1 kilometre (0.62 mi) from Bukoba's centre on the western shore of Lake Victoria. The airport was first constructed in the 1940s by the British colonial administration. A series of reconstruction works from 2008 to 2016 expanded and paved its runway and constructed a new terminal building.

The Bukoba non-directional beacon (Ident: BK) is located on the field.

== History ==
Bukoba Airport was constructed in the 1940s by the British colonial administration during World War II.

Before 2008, Bukoba Airport had a single 1,280 m (4,200 ft) long variable width runway, a taxiway, and an apron, all gravel surfaced. Beginning in 2008, the airport was expanded in two phases. The first phase, funded by the Tanzanian government, began in 2008 and lengthened the runway to 1,600 m (5,200 ft). The second phase, which began in 2010, paved the runway, taxiway, and apron with bitumen and constructed a new terminal building and utility infrastructure. Construction was complete by November 2016.

The expansion cost about TSh 20.5 billion (US$8.8 million). Phase 2 of the expansion required the acquisition of land, leading to the demolition of a church and the relocation of Tumaimi Primary School to the Mafumbo area. Compensation amounting to TSh 900 million (US$550,000) was pledged by deputy minister for transport Charles Tizeba in 2014.

== Airlines and destinations ==
Airlines	Destinations
Air Tanzania	Mwanza
Auric Air	Mwanza, Rubondo
Precision Air	Dar es Salaam, Mwanza

== Accidents and incidents ==
- On 6 November 2022, Precision Air Flight 494 from Dar es Salaam with 43 people on board crashed into Lake Victoria while attempting to land at the airport during bad weather and low visibility. The crash resulted in 19 fatalities, including both pilots who drowned before rescue workers could reach them.

== See also ==
- List of airports in Tanzania
- Transport in Tanzania
