= Air Tanzania =

Tanzanian airline

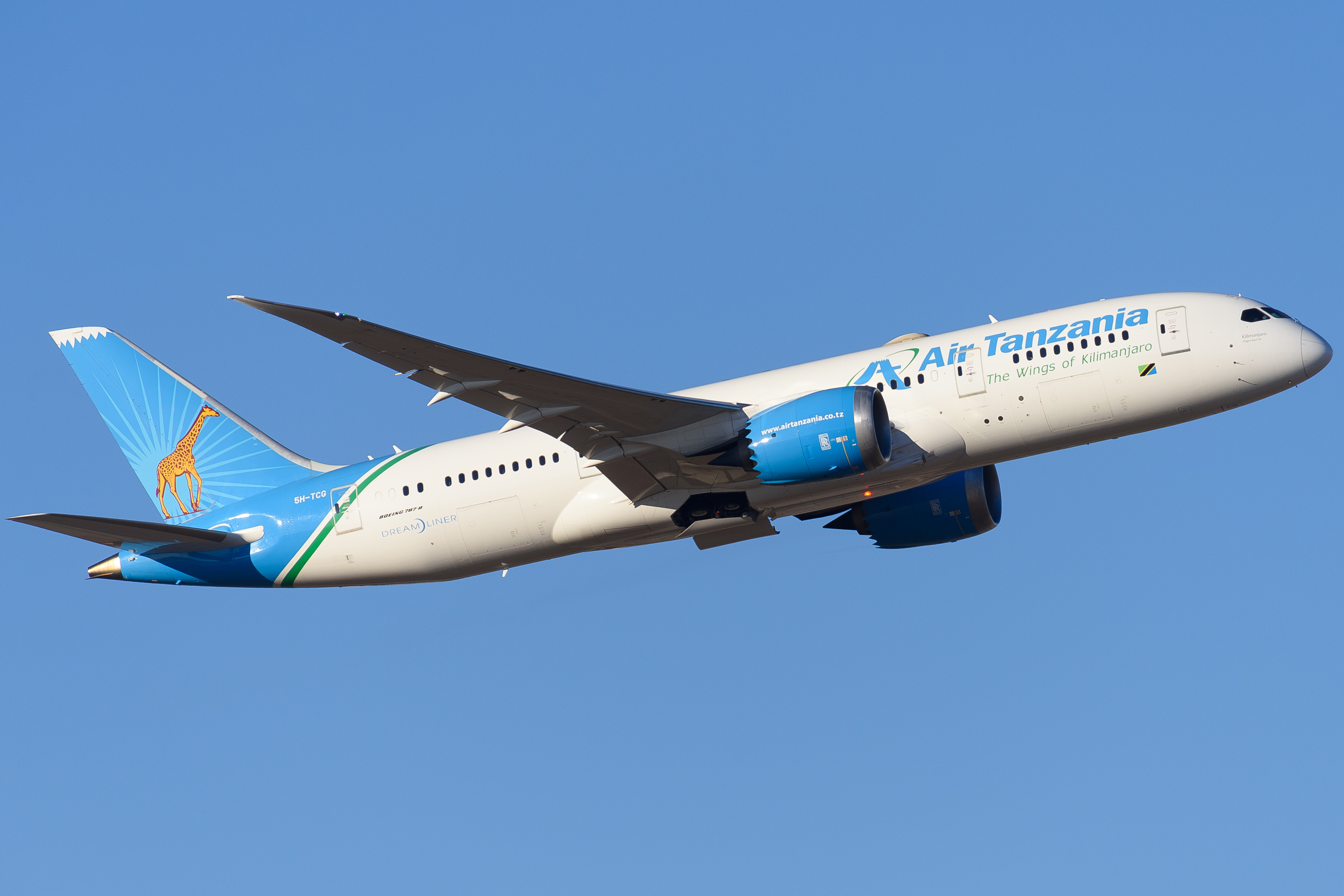
- Air Tanzania Boeing 787-8
IATA	ICAO	Call sign
TC	ATC	TANZANIA
- Founded: 11 March 1977 (as Air Tanzania Corporation)
- Commenced operations: 1 June 1977; 49 years ago
- AOC #: TCAA/AOC/001
- Hubs: Dar es Salaam
- Focus cities: Kilimanjaro; Mwanza; Zanzibar City
- Frequent-flyer program: Twiga Miles
- Fleet size: 15
- Destinations: 36
- Parent company: Tanzanian Government (100%)
- Headquarters: Dar es Salaam, Tanzania
- Key people: Neema Mori (Chairperson); Peter Ulanga (CEO)
- Profit: ▼TSh −56,640 million (US$−21.74 million) (FY 2023)
- Total assets: TSh 330,927.28 million (US$140.82 million) (FY 2022)
- Total equity: TSh −157,716.72 million (US$−67.11 million) (FY 2022)
- Employees: 826 (June 2024)
- Website: www.airtanzania.co.tz

Air Tanzania Company Limited (ATCL) (Swahili: Kampuni ya Ndege ya Tanzania) is the flag carrier airline of Tanzania. It is based in Dar es Salaam, with its hub at Julius Nyerere International Airport.

It was established as Air Tanzania Corporation (ATC) in 1977 after the dissolution of East African Airways and has been a member of the African Airlines Association since its inception. The airline was wholly owned by the Tanzanian government until 2002 when it was partially privatised in partnership with South African Airways, but the government repurchased the shares in 2006, making it once again a wholly owned government company.

In 2016, the Tanzanian government under President John Magufuli initiated a new drive to revive the national carrier by acquiring additional aircraft from Bombardier and Boeing. The airline further intended to double its fleet to 14 aircraft by 2022 and increase its long-haul and regional routes.

A 2021 government report by the Auditor General warned about the company's huge debts. Air Tanzania flights flying abroad ran the risk of being impounded due to huge debts incurred by the company. Despite the warnings, the government of Tanzania continued to finance the airline and announced its biggest bailout of US$194 million for the airline.

== History ==
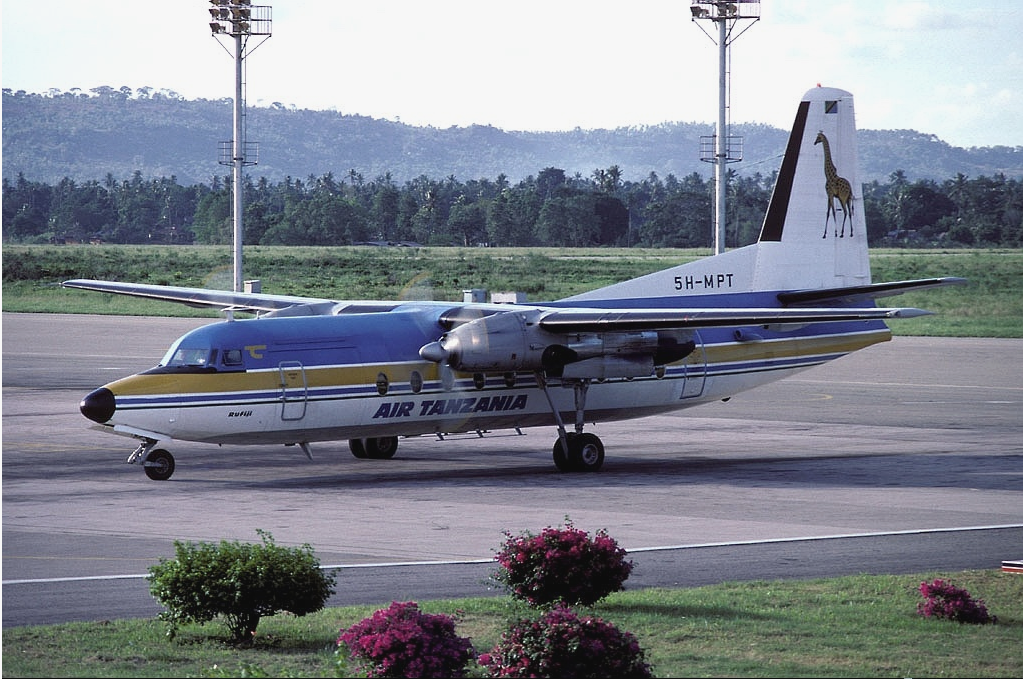
ATC Fokker F27 at Moi Airport, April 1986

=== Air Tanzania Corporation (1977–2002) ===
The Air Tanzania Corporation (ATC) was established on 11 March 1977 after the break-up of East African Airways (EAA), which had previously served the region. The liquidation of EAA followed its accumulation of US$120 million of debt. According to Andy Chande, the founding chairman of the board, Tanzania and Uganda did not receive a fair share of the former carrier's assets despite being equal partners.

The airline commenced operations with a Douglas DC-9-32 leased from Kenya Airways and purchased an additional two Boeing 737, financed by a U.S. bank. It also leased aircraft from Air Madagascar. Four Fokker F27s and four DHC-6-300 Twin Otters were added in 1980. Because of less demand, two of the Fokker 27s were made obsolete in 1981. These aircraft returned to service in 1983 but were once again removed.

In May 1991, Air Tanzania began operating a Boeing 767-200ER that was leased from Ethiopian Airlines, but this aircraft proved to be too large and was returned to the lessor in February 1992. The airline reported a profit of US$650,000 in 1994.

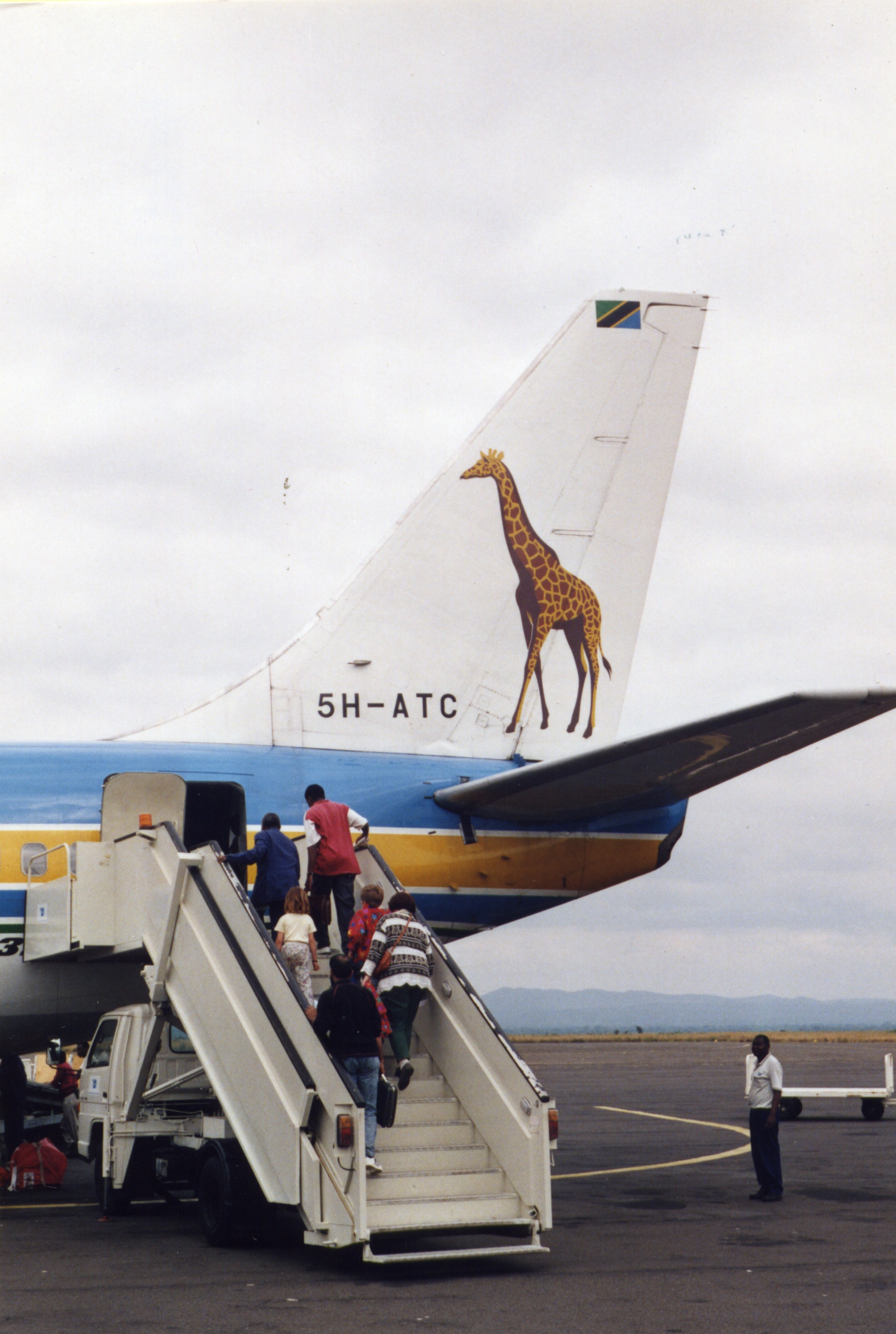
Tail of an Air Tanzania Boeing 737 in 1995, featuring its distinctive giraffe logo

During the 1990s, the airline's acronym ATC was humorously referred to as "Any Time Cancellation" due to its unpredictable flight schedule.

==== Alliance Air ====
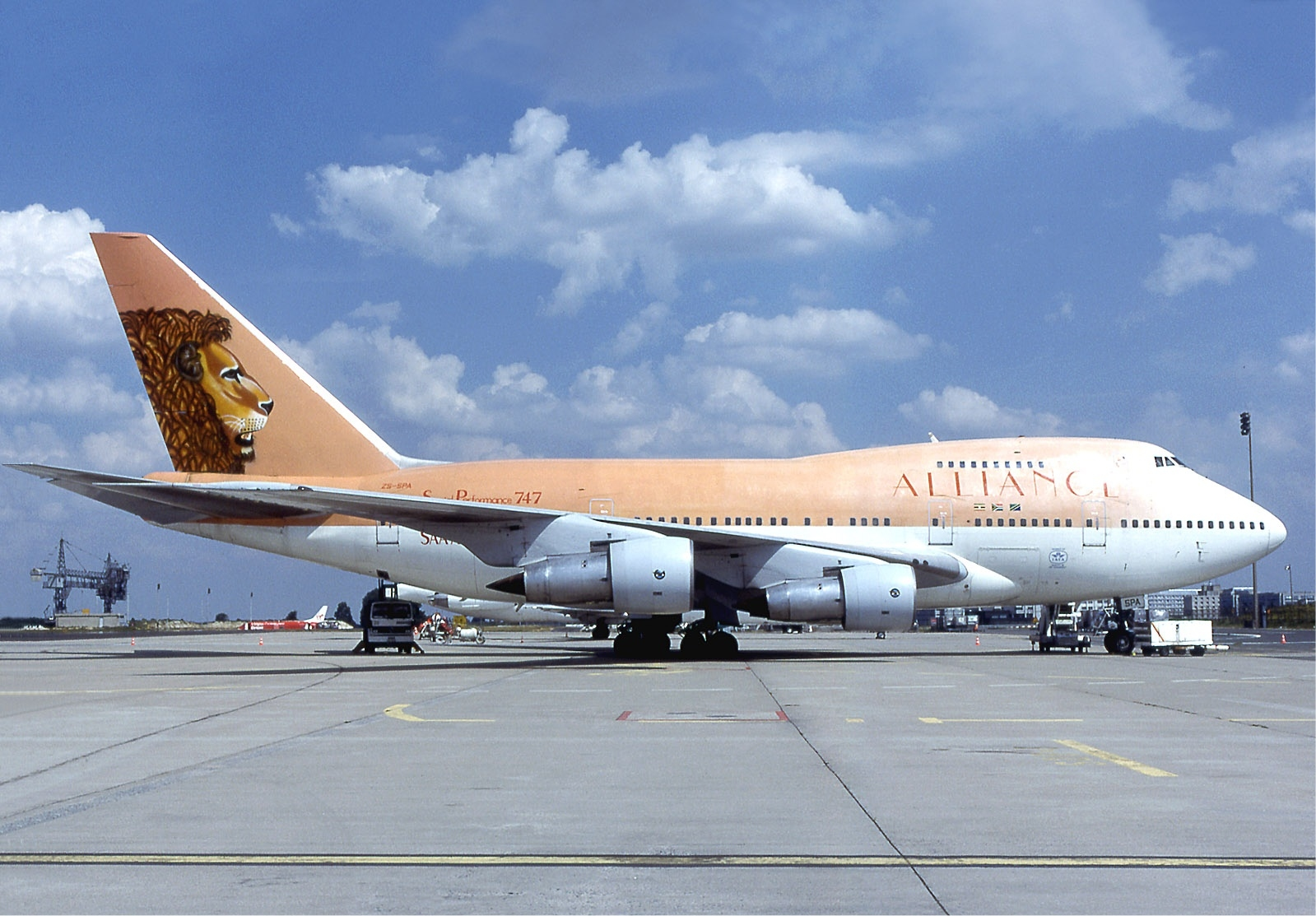
Alliance Air Boeing 747SP

In 1994, Air Tanzania joined with Uganda Airlines and South African Airways (SAA) to form Alliance Air. Air Tanzania had a 10 percent stake in the venture. Flights operated from Dar es Salaam to London–Heathrow via Entebbe on a Boeing 747SP initially, and then a smaller Boeing 767-200. This venture ceased operations in October 2000 after accumulating losses of about US$50 million. The losses had been funded by Transnet, the parent company of SAA, through April 2000. When Transnet refused to continue funding the deficit, Air Tanzania accused SAA of using Alliance Air "as a Trojan Horse to take over national airlines in the region". In February 2002, the government began the process of privatising ATC through the Presidential Parastatal Sector Reform Commission. Advertisements were placed in the local, regional, and international media inviting potential bidders. The International Finance Corporation advised the government in this transaction. The government had approved a transaction structure that included:

- Creation of a new company, "Air Tanzania Company Limited", which would be incorporated as a limited liability company under the Companies Act to take over the operating assets and specified rights and liabilities of ATC.
- A second new company, "Air Tanzania Holding Company", would be created to take over the non-operating assets and all other liabilities of ATC.

Eight airlines submitted expressions of interest:

- Aero Asia International (Pakistan)
- Air Consult International (Ireland)
- Comair (South Africa)
- Air Gulf Falcon (United Arab Emirates)
- Kenya Airways (Kenya)
- Nationwide Airlines (South Africa)
- Precision Air (Tanzania)
- South African Airways (South Africa)

Of the eight, four airlines carried out due diligence – South African Airways, Kenya Airways, Comair, and Nationwide Airlines. By 19 September 2002, the bid deadline date, only SAA had submitted a bid. Kenya Airways and Nationwide Airlines had informed the government that they did not intend to submit bids.

=== ATCL (2002–2006) ===
ATCL logo under SAA management

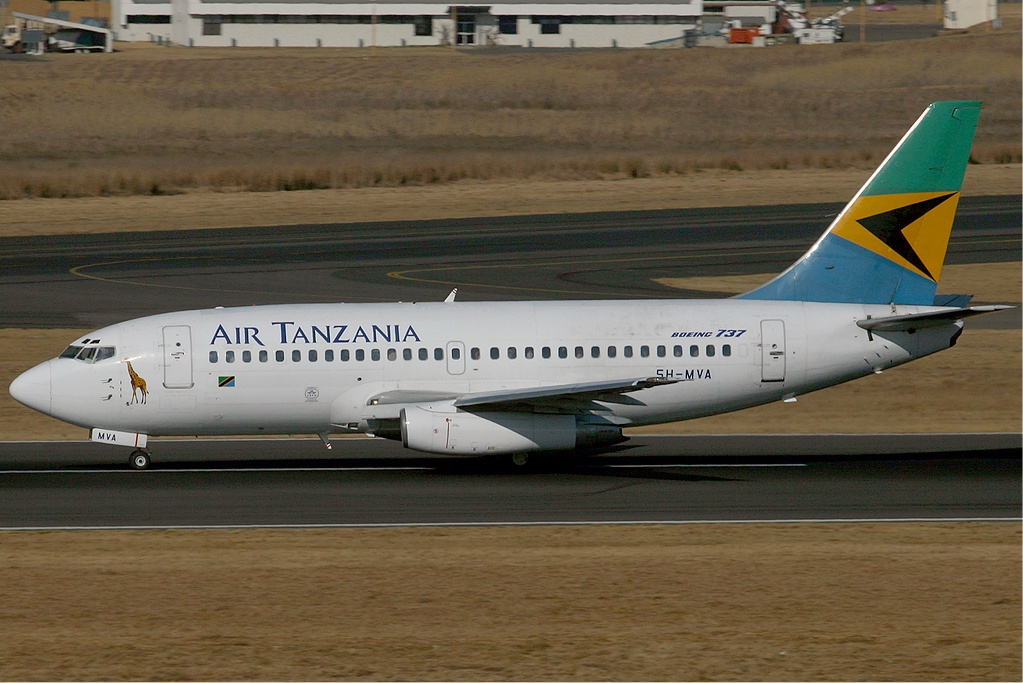
ATCL Boeing 737 at OR Tambo International Airport in July 2006

The Tanzanian government selected SAA as the winning bidder. After signing an agreement with the government, SAA in December 2002 purchased a 49 percent stake in Air Tanzania Company Limited (ATCL) for US$20 million. US$10 million was the value of the government's shares, and the remaining US$10 million was for the Capital and Training Account for financing Air Tanzania's proposed business plan.

As the strategic partner, SAA planned to create its East African hub in Dar es Salaam to form a "Golden Triangle" between southern, eastern, and western Africa. It intended to replace ATCL's fleet with Boeing 737-800s, 737-200s, and 767-300s; and planned to introduce regional routes, including routes to the Middle East and West Africa. The government was expected to sell 10 percent of its stake to a private Tanzanian investor, thereby reducing the government's ownership to a non-controlling interest of 41% n ATCL.

The new Air Tanzania airline was launched on 31 March 2003, offering direct flights from Dar es Salaam to Johannesburg, Zanzibar and Kilimanjaro.

Air Tanzania recorded a pre-tax loss of almost US$7.3 million in its first year following privatisation. The loss was attributed mainly to the inability to expand the network as quickly and extensively as originally planned. It had been hoped to launch services to Dubai, India, and Europe, but these were delayed as Air Tanzania had only had short-haul Boeing 737-200s in its fleet. The development of Dar es Salaam as an East African hub for the SAA alliance had also not proceeded as quickly as planned.

On 31 January 2005, Air Tanzania suspended one of its few regional services, Dar es Salaam to Nairobi, following intense competition from Kenya Airways on the route. The airline, however, reaffirmed its intention to launch long-haul services within a year from Dar es Salaam to Dubai, London, Mumbai, and Muscat.

The Tanzanian government announced on 31 March 2006 that it would dispose of ATCL following four years of losses, which amounted to US$20.5 million (TZS.24.7 billion). The director-general of the Tanzania Civil Aviation Authority, Margaret Munyagi, said: "Air Tanzania was in a worse state than before it was taken over by SAA." SAA, however, claimed the Tanzanian government was "not serious" for failing to release about US$30 million, which was needed to implement Air Tanzania's business strategy to reverse continued losses.

On 7 September 2006, the Tanzanian government bought SAA's 49 percent stake in ATCL for US$1 million, officially terminating its partnership with SAA. The venture collapsed due to the partners' different interests in the business.

=== Relaunched ATCL (2007–2015) ===
After the partnership between Air Tanzania and South African Airways (SAA) was officially terminated, the government set aside US$10 million (TZS13 billion) for Air Tanzania to start using its ticket stock (number 197) instead of the stock of SAA (number 083), changing revenue systems and fuel services, preparing e-ticketing and accounts systems, using a new trademark, and clearing outstanding debts. President Jakaya Kikwete appointed Mustafa Nyang'anyi, a veteran politician and diplomat ambassador, as the board chairman, and former Parastatal Pensions Fund director general David Mattaka as managing director and chief executive officer.

In conjunction, the government also began to look for another private partner to run the airline. The first discussions began with China Sonangol International Limited in 2007, however, the discussions were ultimately unsuccessful and ended in 2010. From 1 July 2007, ATCL started using its own ticket stock and began operations as a wholly owned government airline.

The Parliamentary Committee on Economic Infrastructure expressed its concern about no funds being set aside for ATCL. According to the opposition, the airline has debts amounting to US$4 million due to SAA.

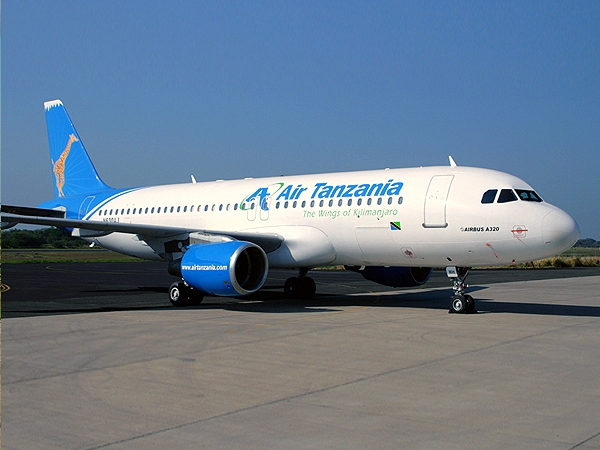
Leased Airbus A320

==== Rebranding ====
Air Tanzania was relaunched in September 2007 with two leased Boeing 737-200s in its fleet. The new brand represented the company's name, Mount Kilimanjaro and the airline's international destinations. The introduction of the airline's new logo on a leased Airbus A320 bore the image of the imposing giraffe – Tanzania's national icon, to replace the South African Airways flag symbol. On 1 October 2007, the revamped Air Tanzania made its inaugural flight on the Dar es Salaam to Mwanza via Kilimanjaro route.

In February 2008, the carrier acquired two de Havilland Canada Dash DHC 8-Q311s. In December 2008, the Tanzania Civil Aviation Authority (TCAA) withdrew Air Tanzania's Air Operator Certificate because the airline had failed to meet the standards of the International Civil Aviation Organization. Two weeks later, the International Air Transport Association banned the air carrier from all aviation transactions and informed all travel agencies and other aviation companies to stop all transactions with Air Tanzania until further notice. The certificate was restored in January 2009, with both the TCAA and Air Tanzania claiming there had never been any doubt about the airworthiness of its aircraft. In 2009, Air Tanzania flew 60,018 passengers, while local competitors Precision Air moved 583,000 passengers and Coastal Aviation 141,995 passengers.

Once the talks with China Sonangol International Limited fell through, press reports in July 2010 indicated that Air Tanzania was in serious discussions with Air Zimbabwe to establish extensive and substantive management collaborative arrangements. Both airlines were reported to be in search of strategic partners to shore up their operations, which had been in decline over the past decade.

==== Decline ====
From 2011 to 2015, the airline was in a constant period of decline, shutting down operations multiple times due to lack of aircraft. Air Tanzania was effectively grounded in March 2011, after its sole remaining operational aircraft, a Bombardier Q300, was sent to South Africa for heavy maintenance, leaving the carrier stranded due to its failure to secure suitable aircraft leases for the duration. At the time, the other Bombardier Q300 was undergoing a heavy C-check at ATCL's hangar in Dar es Salam, stranded there due to lack of funds to import spare parts from abroad. Air Tanzania resumed flying in November 2011 following the return of the aircraft. The maintenance cost US$1 million, but other accumulated expenses brought the total bill to $3 million, which the Tanzanian government paid in September 2011.

In November 2011, Air Tanzania leased a Fokker F28 aircraft from JetLink Express on a standby basis in case its only operational aircraft were incapacitated. The airline assured the public that it would never cease operations again and that more aircraft would be procured over the next several months and years, according to the airline business plan shared with the media. On 21 November 2011, Air Tanzania began negotiations with Export Development Canada (EDC) to explore how EDC could assist the airline in acquiring more aircraft from Bombardier, a Canadian aircraft manufacturer. Those negotiations, however, failed due to the airline's large amount of debt.

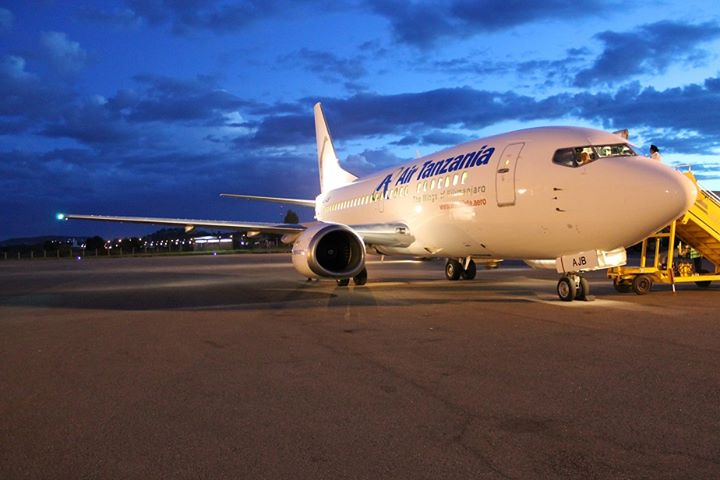
Leased Boeing 737-500

On 29 March 2012, Aerovista leased a Boeing 737-500 to Air Tanzania to enhance the airline's service delivery in the short term. In early August 2012, Air Tanzania suspended the contract with Aerovista and returned the aircraft. The only other aircraft in the fleet, a Bombardier Q300, was stored for maintenance, which caused the airline to suspend operations and rebook passengers to other carriers. Air Tanzania returned to the skies on 12 October 2012 with a 32-year-old Boeing 737-200. The aircraft was leased for three months from Star Air Cargo in South Africa. The 737 arrived in Dar es Salaam on 11 October 2012 in Air Tanzania livery and started operations the following day.

In late 2012, the Controller and Auditor General of Tanzania, Ludovick Utouh, recommended the criminal prosecution of three former managers of ATCL for the 2007 lease of the Airbus A320 from Wallis Trading Company, a Lebanese company. The Auditor General said there was massive misappropriation and mismanagement of the leasing agreement, resulting in accumulated debt of US$41.4 million by October 2012, all of which is guaranteed by the government. The aircraft was in ATCL's possession for 48 months, but it spent 41 of those months in France undergoing major maintenance.

Air Tanzania restarted operations in Kigoma on 10 January 2013, using its Bombardier Q300. The airline quickly expanded to domestic routes and even began to fly to Bujumbura, Burundi under new management.

In the airline's search for a new partner in January 2013, the chairman of Al Hayat Development and Investment Company (AHDIC), Sheikh Salim Al-Harthyan, announced plans for an Omani investment corporation to invest US$100 million in Air Tanzania. The money would be used to build an airline training centre and offices for Air Tanzania, buy aircraft, and engage in other development activities that would begin before the end of 2013. In August 2013, AHDIC promised to provide four Embraer 175 and four Bombardiers to Air Tanzania. The Sheikh also said that the original US$100 million investment would be increased gradually. But in May 2014, the media reported no progress had been made and that AHDIC might not be a real company. Sixteen days later, however, AHDIC reaffirmed its interest in the original deal but this never materalised.

=== Revival (2016–present) ===
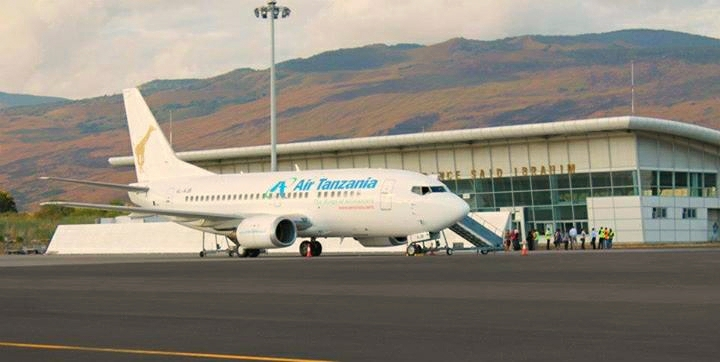
Air Tanzania B737 at Hahaya Airport

A year into the new government of President John Magufuli, he made the revival of the airline a top priority of his administration. In May 2016, the government announced plans to purchase two aircraft in 2016 and two additional aircraft in 2017. On 15 September 2016, the president appointed Ladislaus Matindi as director general of the Air Tanzania Company Limited.

To protect the government's investments from debt collectors, the government, through its Tanzania Government Flight Agency (TGFA), took delivery of two Bombardier Q400 turboprop aircraft at Julius Nyerere International Airport in Dar es Salaam and leased the aircraft to Air Tanzania. On 2 December 2016, Bombardier Commercial Aircraft announced that the Tanzanian government, acting through its TGFA, had signed firm purchase agreements for two CS300 jetliners and one Q400 turboprop aircraft for lease to Air Tanzania. The CS300 aircraft are now known as Airbus A220-300 aircraft. The TGFA also ordered two Boeing 787 Dreamliner aircraft valued at US$224.6 million at list prices.

With the new airplanes, Air Tanzania resumed service to various domestic destinations.

On 2 April 2018, Air Tanzania received its third Q400 aircraft with tail number 5H-TCE. This aircraft had been scheduled to be delivered in August 2017, but the delivery was delayed after being seized by Canadian contractor Sterling following the Tanzanian government's unwillingness to settle a US$38.7 million debt awarded to the contractor by the International Court of Arbitration in 2010. By March 2018, the legal situation was brought under control and the seized plane was released. On 8 July 2018, Air Tanzania took delivery of a Boeing 787 Dreamliner, to be deployed on intercontinental flights.

Air Tanzania received its first Airbus A220-300, registered as 5H-TCH, in December 2018 and second on 11 January 2019 christened Ngorongoro and registered as 5H-TCI. The airline became the first African operator of this aircraft type and the fifth airline globally with an A220 family airplane.

In August 2019, one of the Airbus 220s was seized at O R Tambo International Airport in Johannesburg due to unpaid debt owed by the Tanzanian government. The airline subsequently suspended all flights to South Africa, citing safety concerns over xenophobic attacks. The airline continues to be unable to service certain destinations of the fear of the planes being impounded.

The airline also plans to grow its cargo operations and at the Dubai Airshow 15 November 2021 placed its first order of a Boeing 767-300 Freighter. The total order was valued at more than $726 million at list prices which included a new Boeing 787-8 Dreamliner and two Boeing 737 MAX. The airline began its first dedicated cargo flight to Guangzhou Airport in mid 2021 as passenger service was delayed due to COVID-19 restrictions in mainland China.

==== EU ban ====
On 13 December 2024, the European Union (EU) banned Air Tanzania fleet from entering the European Union due to safety concerns identified by the EASA after an audit. The ban centers largely around the airline's alleged inability to manage its training programs and lack of insight into the causes of its safety deficiencies.

=== Establishment of direct flights to Somalia ===
On 1 July 2025, Tanzania and Somalia signed agreements to restore direct flights between Dar es Salaam and Mogadishu within the coming weeks. This development coincides with Somalia's progress in managing its airspace and improving its aviation infrastructure. Combined with better security, these steps have helped reopen important transport connections. Air Tanzania is set to operate the new route, marking a renewed link between the two countries.

== Corporate affairs ==
=== Ownership ===
Air Tanzania is wholly owned by the Government of Tanzania. As of 30 June 2011, its share capital was about TSh.13.4 billion/=. The board of directors comprises government appointees and has been criticized for having "not a single member with experience in aviation matters".

=== Business trends ===
Financial and other figures for Air Tanzania are not formally published regularly. Based on various press reports, government documents and statements by officials, recent trends are (to year ending 30 June):

	2014	2015	2016	2017	2018	2019	2020	2021	2022	2023	2024	2025
Turnover (TSh billion)							157,600	174,590	254,443	380,357	461,170	
Profits (PBT) (TSh billion)							−60.2	−36.2	−33.7	−54.6	−88.9	−191.2
Turnover (US$m)			0.3	1.9			67.8	75.2				
Net profit (US$m)			−6.2	−1.9			−25.9	−15.5	−15.1	−22.7		
Number of employees					196							
Number of passengers (000s)												
Passenger load factor (%)												55
Number of aircraft (at year end)	1	1	3	3	5	8	9	9		15		
Notes/sources												

A 2021 government report by the Auditor General warned of the company's huge debts. Air Tanzania flights flying abroad ran the risk of being impounded due to huge debts incurred by the company. Despite the warnings, the government of Tanzania continued to finance the airline and announced its biggest bailout of US$194 million for the airline.

In April 2022, the Controller and Auditor General (CAG) also raised warning flags about the proper maintenance of Air Tanzania's fleet, citing outstanding maintenance debts of TSh.74.09 billion/= (US$31.9 million) for 2019/20 and 2020/21.

== Destinations ==
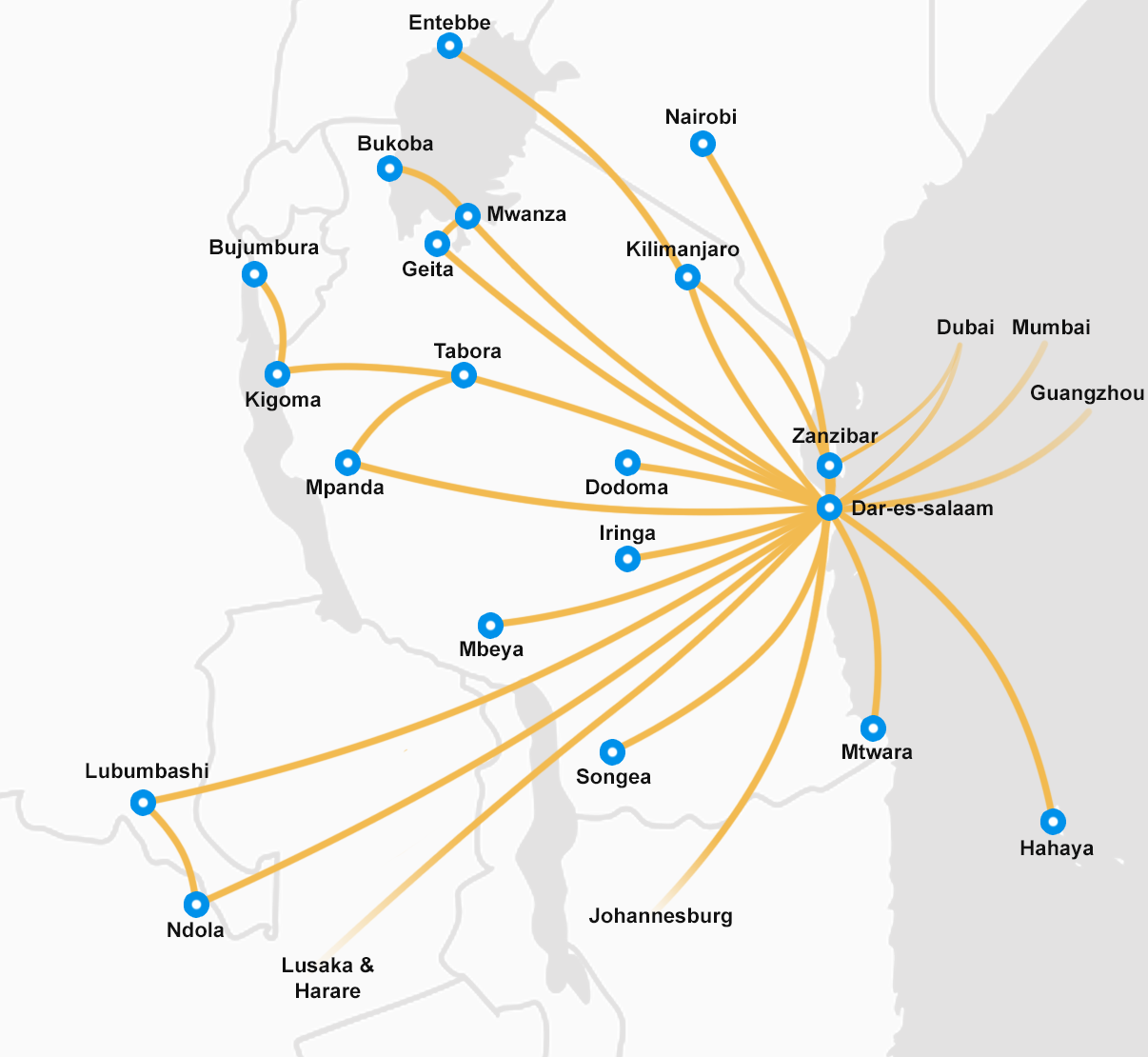
Air Tanzania destinations, December 2024

As of November 2026, Air Tanzania serves sixteen domestic and twenty international destinations.

=== Interline agreement ===
Air Tanzania interlines with the following airlines:

- Air India
- Proflight Zambia
- Qatar Airways

== Fleet ==
=== Current fleet ===
As of November 2026, Air Tanzania operates the following aircraft:

A Boeing 767-300ER freighter aircraft of Air Tanzania Cargo along with Air Hong Kong aircraft.

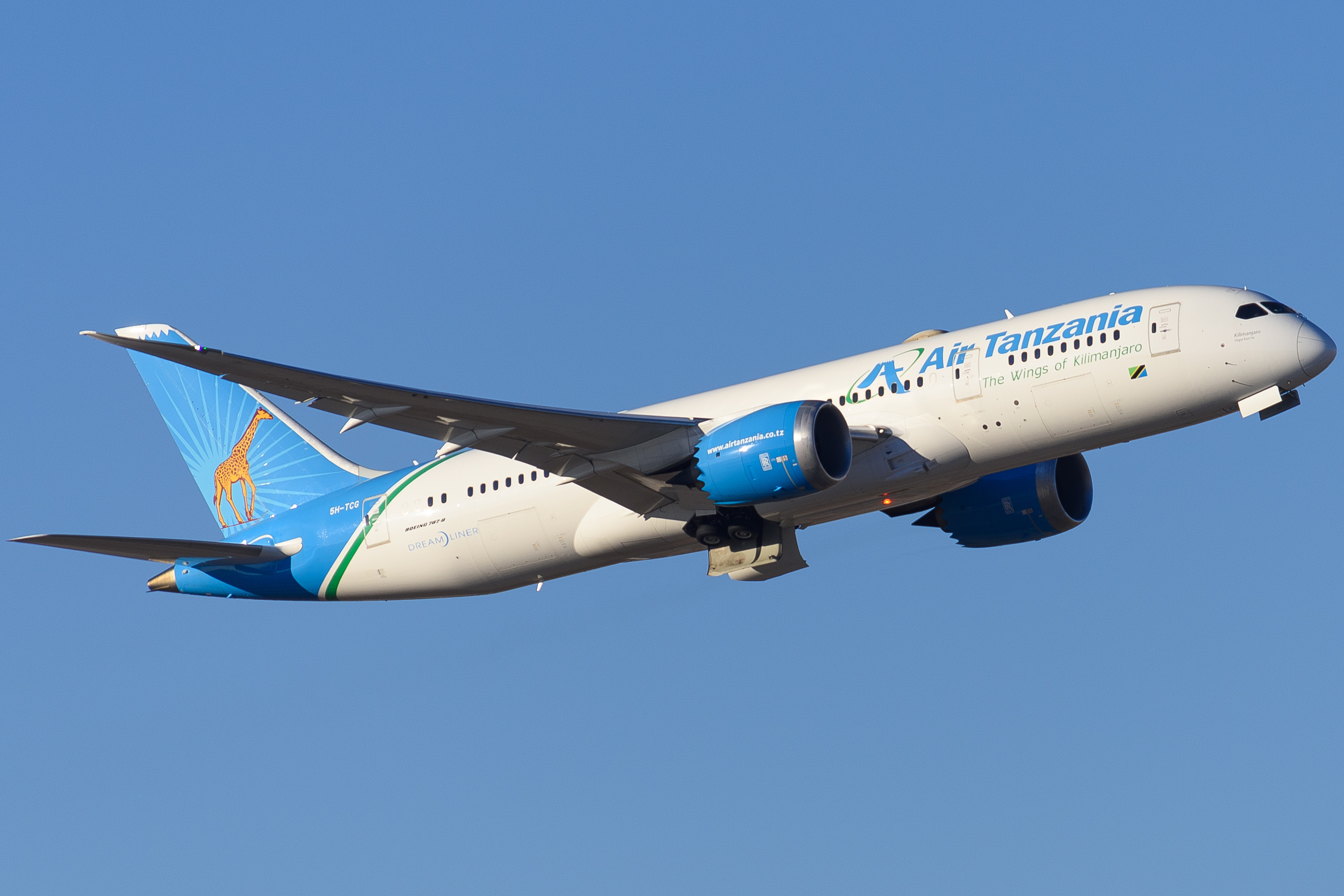
A Boeing 787 Dreamliner of Air Tanzania

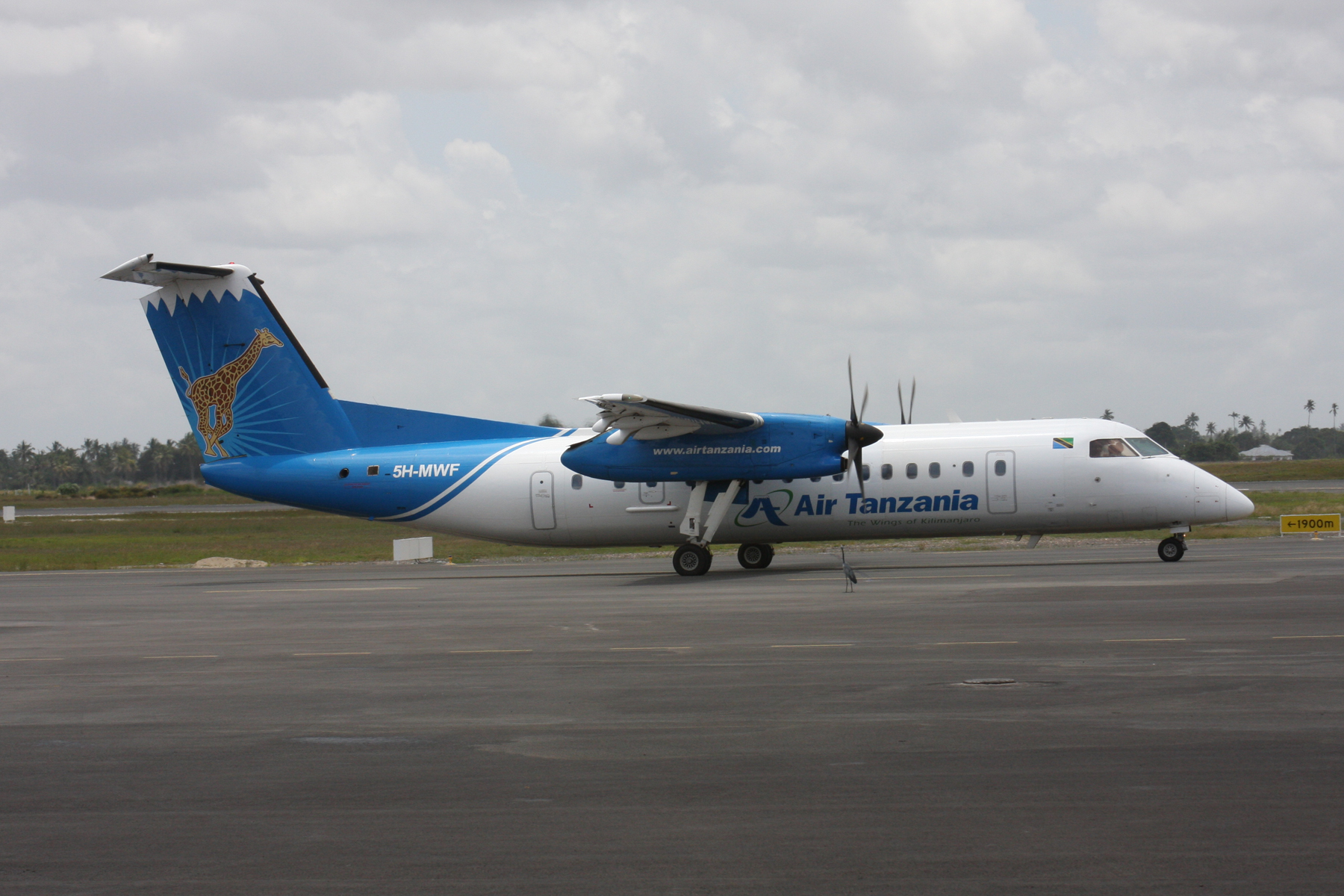
A Dash 8-300 of Air Tanzania

Air Tanzania fleet
Aircraft	In Service	Orders	Passengers			Notes
Aircraft	In Service	Orders	C	Y	Total	Notes
Airbus A220-300	4	—	12	120	132	
Boeing 737 MAX 9	2	—	16	165	181	
Boeing 787-8	3	—	22	240	262	
De Havilland Canada Dash 8-400	5	1	6	70	76	
De Havilland Canada Dash 8-400	5	1	10	68	78	
Cargo fleet
Boeing 767-300F	1	—	Cargo			
Total	15	1				

The airline plans to have 24 aircraft by 2030.

=== Historical fleet ===
Air Tanzania previously operated the following aircraft:

- Airbus A320
- Boeing 707
- Boeing 737-200
- Boeing 737 Classic
- Boeing 767
- Bombardier CRJ200
- DHC-6 Twin Otter
- De Havilland Canada Dash 8-300
- Dornier 228
- Fokker F27 Friendship
- Fokker 50
- McDonnell Douglas DC-9-32

== Accidents and incidents ==
- 27 February 1982: An Air Tanzania Boeing 737-2R8C was hijacked on an internal flight from Mwanza to Dar es Salaam and flown to the UK via Nairobi, Jeddah, and Athens, where two passengers had been released. The aircraft landed at the London Stansted airport, where the hijackers demanded to speak to exiled Tanzanian opposition politician Oscar Kambona. This request was granted, and after 26 hours on the ground, the hijackers surrendered and the passengers were released.
- 1 March 2010: an Air Tanzania Boeing 737-200 (5H-MVZ) skidded off a wet runway while attempting to land at Mwanza Airport. Its nose wheel collapsed, and its hull and righthand engine were damaged, but no injuries were reported. The aircraft proved too expensive to repair and was permanently stored in Mwanza pending resolution of a claim with the airline's insurer.
- 8 April 2012: an Air Tanzania de Havilland Canada DHC-8-311Q (5H-MWG) crashed while trying to take off from Kigoma Airport. No one was injured, but the aircraft was irreparably damaged.

== See also ==
- Neema Swai
