= Flight 494 =

Flight 494 may refer to:

- Eastern Airlines Flight 494, experienced uncommanded deployment of reverse thrust on 21 April 1984
- Precision Air Flight 494, crashed on 6 November 2022
