= HTMW =

HTMW may refer to:

- Mwanza Airport, an airport in Tanzania
- High-temperature mineral wool, a high-temperature insulation made up of mineral fibers
