= Rubondo Airstrip =

Rubondo Airstrip Uwanja mdogo wa Ndege wa Rubondo
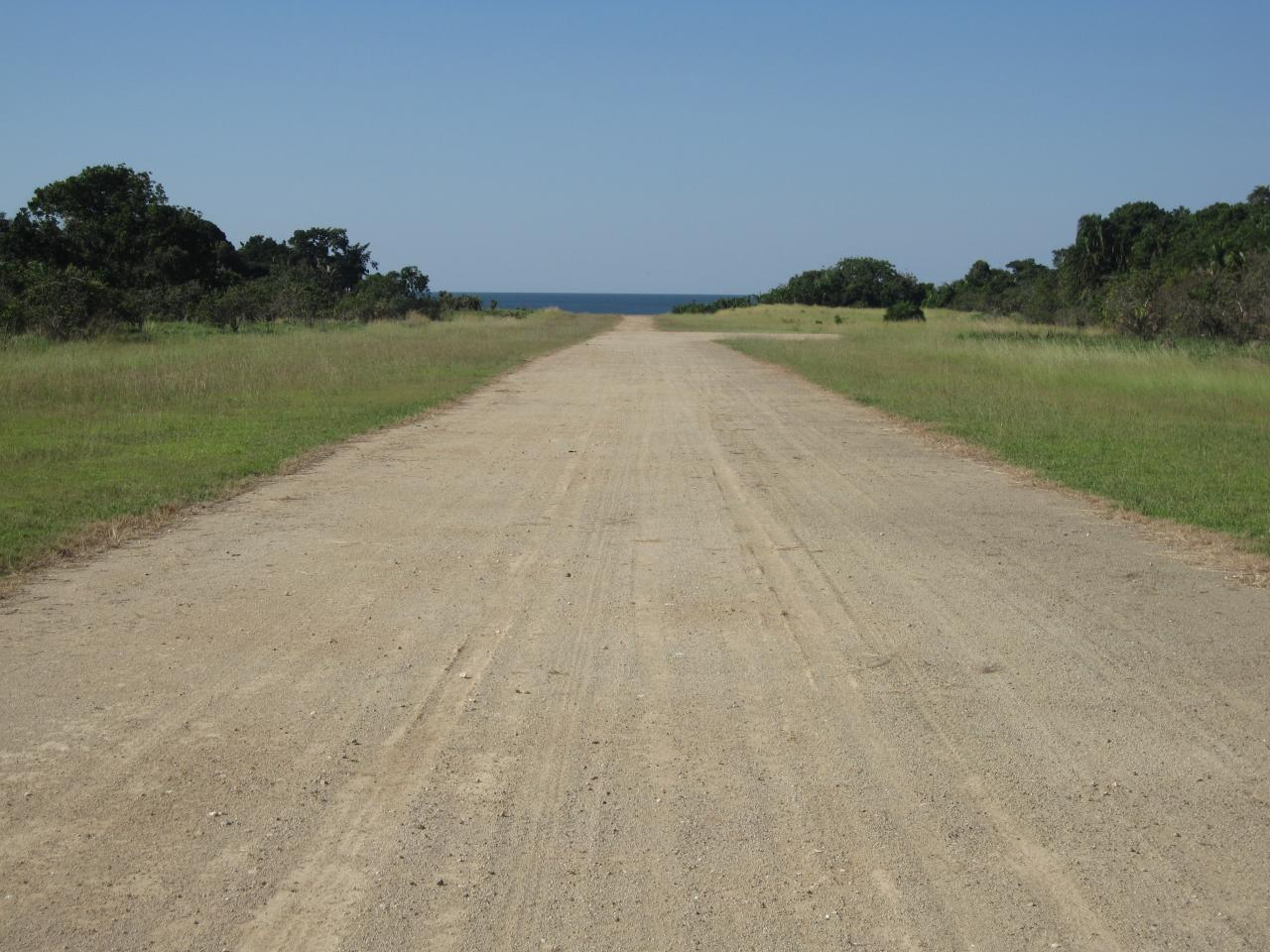
- IATA: none; ICAO: none

Summary
- Airport type: Public
- Owner: Government of Tanzania
- Operator: Tanzania National Parks Authority
- Location: Rubondo Island, Tanzania
- Elevation AMSL: 3,730 ft / 1,137 m
- Coordinates: 2°18′00″S 31°51′00″E
- Website: www.tanapa.go.tz

Map
- Location of airstrip in Tanzania Rubondo (Africa)

Runways
Direction	Length		Surface
Direction	m	ft	Surface
04/22	1,242	4,075	Gravel
- Sources: TCAA Google Maps

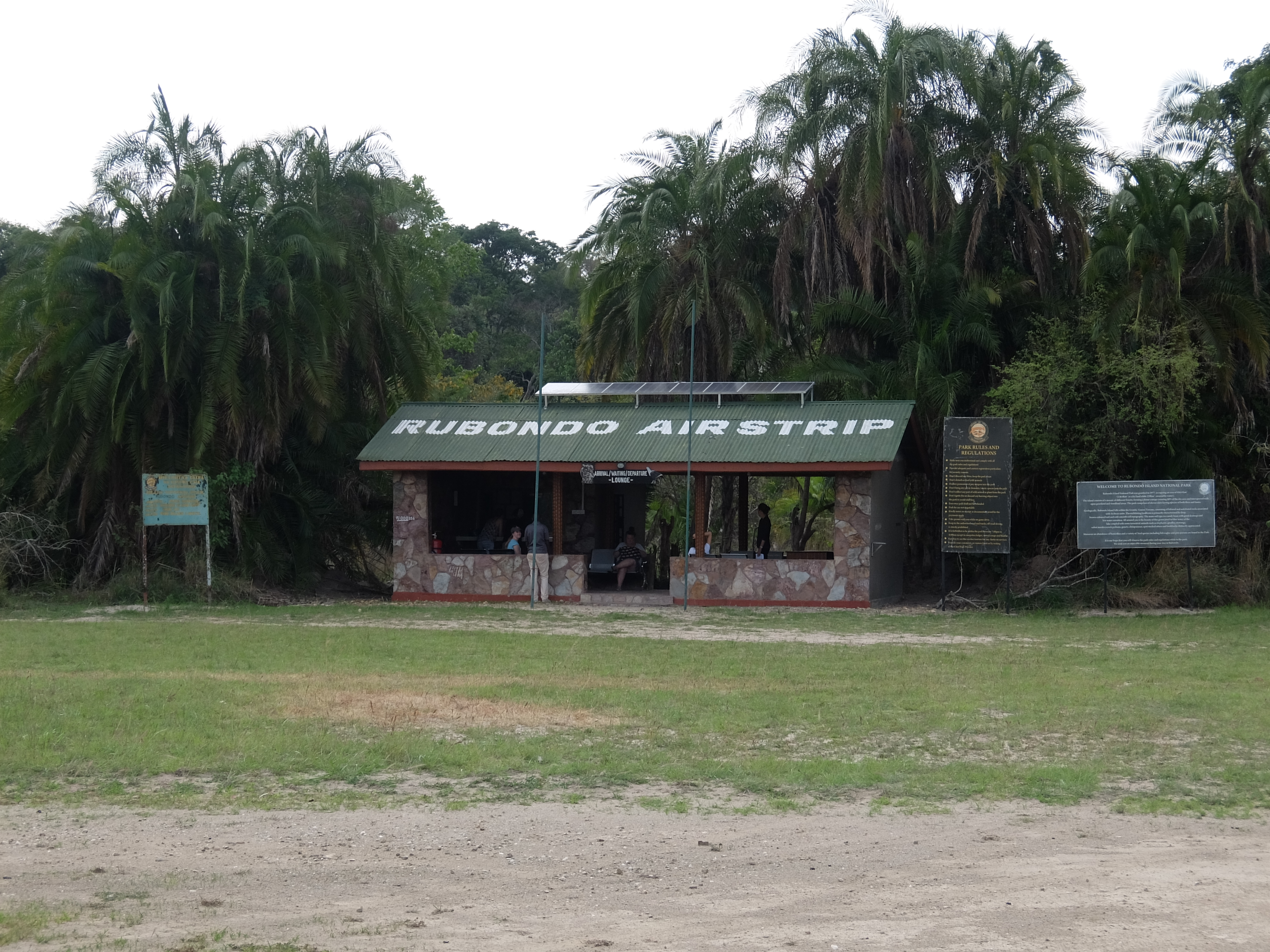
The Rubondo airstrip passenger arrival and departure lounge.

Rubondo Airstrip (TCAA designation: TZ-0023) is an airstrip serving Rubondo Island National Park in the Geita Region of northern Tanzania. The mostly uninhabited game reserve island is in the southwestern tip of Lake Victoria.

== Airlines and destinations ==
Airlines	Destinations
Auric Air	Bukoba, Mwanza
Coastal Aviation	Grumeti, Kogatende, Manyara, Mwanza, Ndutu, Seronera, Zanzibar

== See also ==
- List of airports in Tanzania
- Transport in Tanzania
