= Neema Swai =

Tanzanian commercial airline pilot

- Born: c. 1990 (age 35–36); Tanzania
- Education: Blue Chip Flying Academy (private pilot licence); Tanzania Civil Aviation Authority (commercial pilot licence)
- Occupation: Commercial pilot
- Years active: 2009–present
- Title: Captain of Boeing 767F Freighter
- Spouse: Khamis Ahmed

Neema Swai (born c. 1990) is a Tanzanian commercial pilot. She was the first woman in Tanzania to become certified as a captain of the Boeing 767-300F "freighter" aircraft. She flies for Air Tanzania, the national airline of Tanzania. She is the first woman to make flight captain at that airline.

== Early life and education ==
Neema Swai was born circa 1990 to Tanzanian parents. She is the last-born in a family of three siblings. Her mother operated a pharmacy at Kilimanjaro International Airport and Swai helped at the pharmacy when she was young. There, she observed many female pilots, which piqued her interest.

After primary school in Tanzania, she completed high school in neighbouring Uganda, taking physics, economics, geography and mathematics.

With support from her parents, she enrolled in the Blue Chip Flying Academy in Pretoria, South Africa, and obtained her private pilot licence in three months at age 19. She obtained the commercial pilot licence after another six months. In 2009, her training class had only two black students, and she was the only female student. On returning to Tanzania, she underwent further examination so the Tanzania Civil Aviation Authority would certify her credentials.

== Career ==
Starting in 2000, Swai was employed by a Tanzanian airline, flying the ATR72-500. During the next 14 years she clocked over 8,700 flight hours.

As of December 2024 she flies as captain on the B767-300F cargo equipment owned and operated by Air Tanzania Company Limited (ACTL). As of then, she was the only female captain on that equipment class and one of only ten female pilots at that airline.

She is well regarded in Tanzania and was listed by The Citizen as one of the country's most inspirational women in 2024.

== Personal ==
She is married to Fight Captain Khamis Ahmed who also is employed by Air Tanzania. She is the mother to one child.
