= Precision Air Flight 494 =

2022 aviation accident in Tanzania

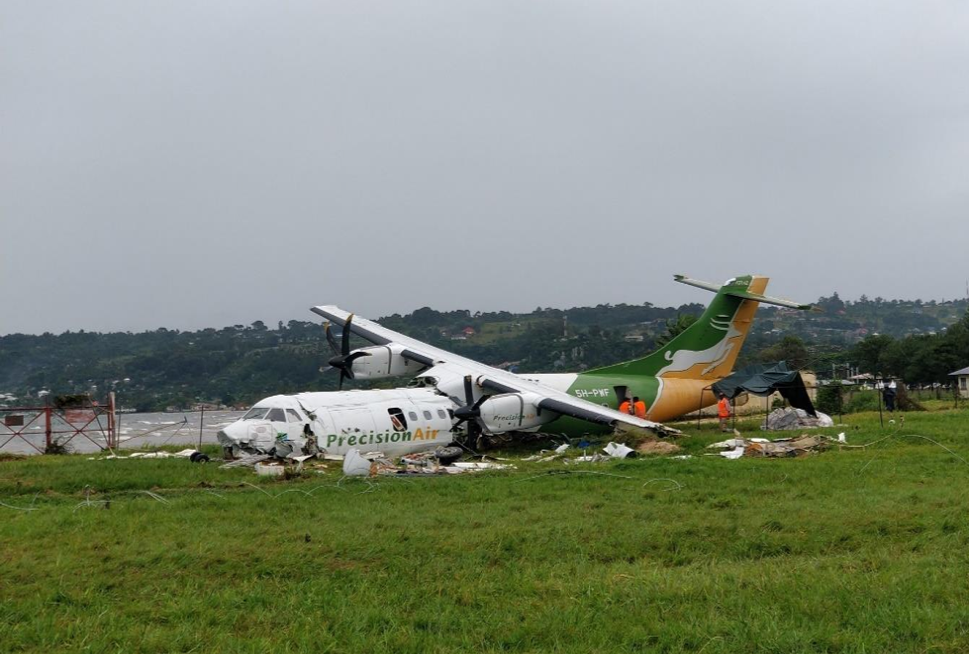
- Wreckage of the aircraft after being recovered from Lake Victoria

Accident
- Date: 6 November 2022
- Summary: Controlled flight into terrain
- Site: Lake Victoria, near Bukoba Airport, Bukoba, Tanzania; 01°20′07″S 31°49′33″E

Aircraft
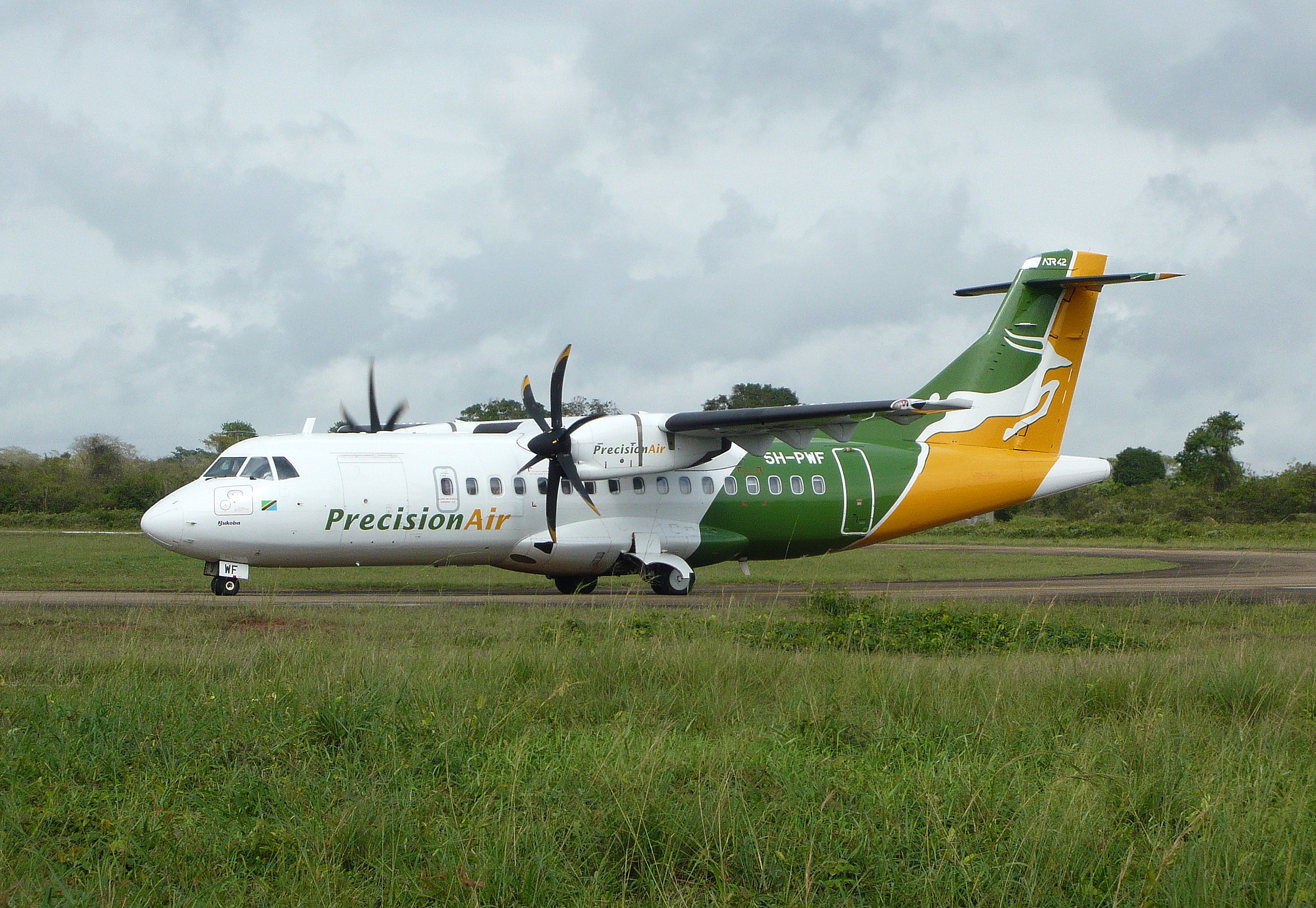
- 5H-PWF, the aircraft involved in the accident, seen in 2011
- Aircraft type: ATR 42-500
- Aircraft name: Bukoba
- Operator: Precision Air
- IATA flight No.: PW494
- ICAO flight No.: PRF494
- Call sign: PRECISION AIR 494
- Registration: 5H-PWF
- Flight origin: Dar es Salaam International Airport, Dar es Salaam, Tanzania
- Stopover: Mwanza Airport, Mwanza, Tanzania
- Destination: Bukoba Airport, Bukoba, Tanzania
- Occupants: 43
- Passengers: 39
- Crew: 4
- Fatalities: 19
- Injuries: 24
- Survivors: 24

Precision Air Flight 494 was a scheduled domestic passenger flight within Tanzania, from Julius Nyerere International Airport to Bukoba Airport via Mwanza Airport. On 6 November 2022, the ATR 42-500 plane crashed in Lake Victoria while attempting to land at Bukoba during bad weather and low visibility. Nineteen people were killed, including both pilots who drowned before rescue workers could reach them.

== Background ==
=== Aircraft ===
The aircraft involved in the accident was a 12-year-old ATR 42-500 named "Bukoba," with serial number 819, registered as 5H-PWF. It was delivered to Precision Air in August 2010. The aircraft was powered by two Pratt & Whitney Canada PW127 turboprop engines.

=== Passengers and crew ===
There were 39 passengers and 4 crew members on board, including one infant. The majority of those were Tanzanians, and local media stated that at least two were Kenyans, including the first officer.

The Captain on board flight 494 was identified as 64 year old Buruhani Rubaga; the co-pilot was 46 year old Peter Odhiambo. Rubega had 23,515 flight hours, with 11,919 being on the ATR-42. Odhiambo had 1,700 of his 2,109 flight hours in the type. Of the 43 people on board, 19 died, including both pilots, who drowned before rescue workers could reach them.

== Accident ==
Flight 494 took off from Dar es Salaam around 06:00 East Africa Time and was scheduled to land at Bukoba around 08:30 after a stopover at Mwanza. A survivor stated that the pilots had to reroute the aircraft due to the deteriorating weather and that the aircraft had to fly towards the Tanzania–Uganda border before turning back towards Bukoba. The passenger further stated that during their approach, they encountered heavy turbulence after being informed that they were to land shortly, eventually finding themselves in the lake with the plane beginning to take on water.

The aircraft crash-landed in Lake Victoria at 08:45, 500 metres (1,600 ft) short of the runway. Survivors stated that the front portion of the aircraft was immediately filled with a large amount of water, causing panic inside the cabin. The flight attendants then opened the emergency exits and passengers began to escape from the sinking aircraft. Photos and videos spread on social media showed the plane almost fully submerged, with only its tail section visible above the water line.

Passengers and crew by nationality
Nationality	Passengers	Crew	Total
Tanzania	38	3	41
Kenya	1	1	2
Total	39	4	43

== Rescue and recovery ==
Local fishermen were the first to arrive at the scene of the crash. They broke the rear door by smashing it with a rowing oar, successfully rescuing those who were seated at the back. Both pilots were still conscious and alive as there was no water leakage inside the cockpit. A fisherman tried to break the cockpit windows with an axe but was advised to stop by those in communication with the pilots. He then tied a rope to the cockpit emergency door and tried to pull it open by using other nearby boats. The rope snapped, however, knocking him unconscious.

Rescue workers arrived at the scene to rescue those still trapped inside the aircraft. According to Albert Chalamila, the chief administrator of Kagera Region, emergency workers were in touch with the pilots in the cockpit and attempted to pull the plane closer to the shore using ropes and cranes.

== Investigation ==
During the funeral service of the victims in Kagera's Kaitaba Stadium, Prime Minister Kassim Majaliwa ordered an inquiry into the crash. The Tanzania Civil Aviation Authority (CAA) would be involved in the probe. The French Bureau of Enquiry and Analysis for Civil Aviation Safety (BEA) confirmed that their members would travel to Tanzania to assist with the investigation. Technical advisers from ATR would also join the investigation effort.

In 2023 the CAA released their preliminary report. It stated that the approach was conducted under visual flight rules in poor weather and that the flight crew ignored alerts from the Enhanced Ground Proximity Warning System (EGPWS).

On 18 January 2025, the final report into the accident was released by Tanzania's AAIB. The investigation found that the crew had failed to properly respond to EGPWS warnings until 2 seconds before impact. The report stated that the aircraft struck the water at 2° pitch down and banked 10° to the left. A failure in CRM was cited.

== Response ==
Bukoba Airport was closed until November 9.

President Samia Suluhu Hassan tweeted: "I have received with sadness the information of the crash of the Precision Air flight at Lake Victoria, in the Kagera region, I send my condolences to all those affected by this incident. Let's continue to be calm as the rescue operation continues and we pray to God to help us." Majaliwa visited the site and said that an extensive investigation would be carried out to determine the full causes of the crash.

On 7 November, a funeral service was held at Kagera Kaitaba Stadium. Prime Minister Majaliwa, along with Muslim and Christian clerics, led prayers for the victims at Kaitaba Stadium, where hundreds of mourners had gathered. He later stated that the funeral cost would be covered by the government, adding that an additional 1,000,000 shillings would be provided for the relatives of the victims.

== See also ==
- List of accidents and incidents involving commercial aircraft
