= Aerovista =

Airlines of the United Arab Emirates

- Company type: Private
- Industry: Aircraft leasing, trading, asset management
- Founded: 1999
- Headquarters: Dubai, United Arab Emirates
- Services: Aircraft leasing, asset management, aircraft sales, charter services
- Divisions: Fly2Sky Airlines, Aerovista Engineering, 3Green DWC LLC
- Website: aerovista.aero

Aerovista is an aircraft leasing, trading and asset management service provider with its headquarters in Dubai in the United Arab Emirates.

== Overview ==
Aerovista was founded in 1999 and has worked with regional and domestic airlines in CIS, Middle East, African, Asian and European markets. Aerovista provides leasing, asset management, aircraft sales and aircraft charter services to customers in emerging markets. Aerovista also owns other aviation related companies, for example Fly2Sky Airlines, a European based ACMI & charter airline, Aerovista Engineering, an EASA CAMO & Part-145 organization, and 3Green DWC LLC, an operations support and consultancy.

== Fleet ==
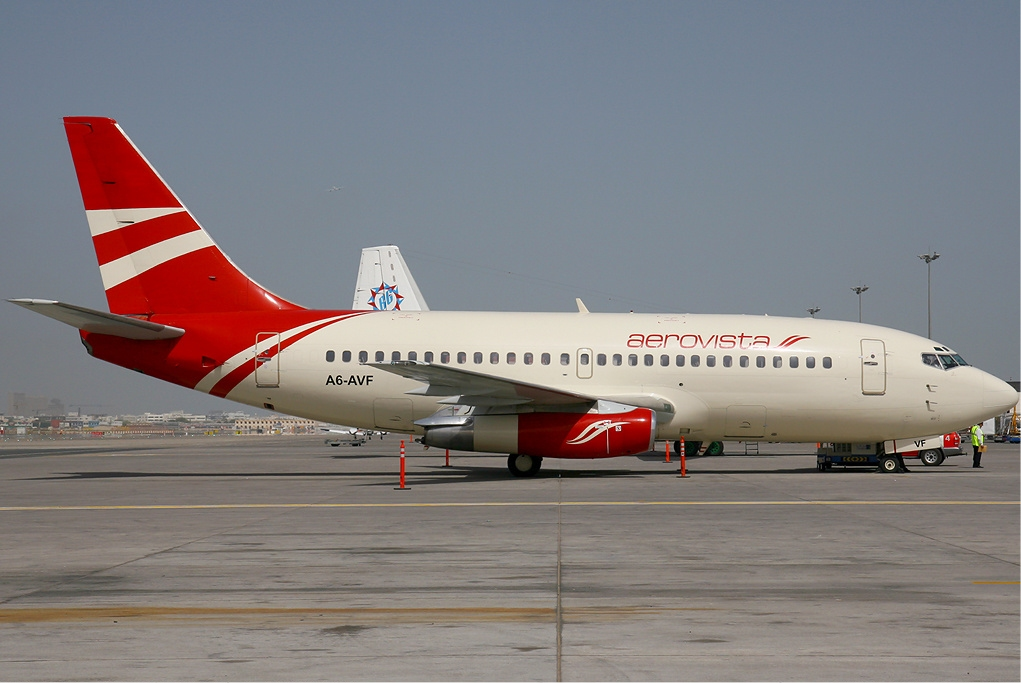
A now retired Aerovista Boeing 737-200

The Aerovista fleet includes the following aircraft (December 2022):

- 3 Airbus A320-200
- 2 Airbus A321-200

== Historical fleet ==
The Aerovista historical fleet includes the following aircraft:

- 3 Boeing 737-300
- 2 Boeing 737-500
- 1 Embraer ERJ 145
- 1 Let L-410 Turbolet
- 1 ATR 72
- 1 Beechcraft King Air 350
