= Mwanza Airport =

Mwanza Airport Uwanja wa Ndege wa Mwanza (Swahili)
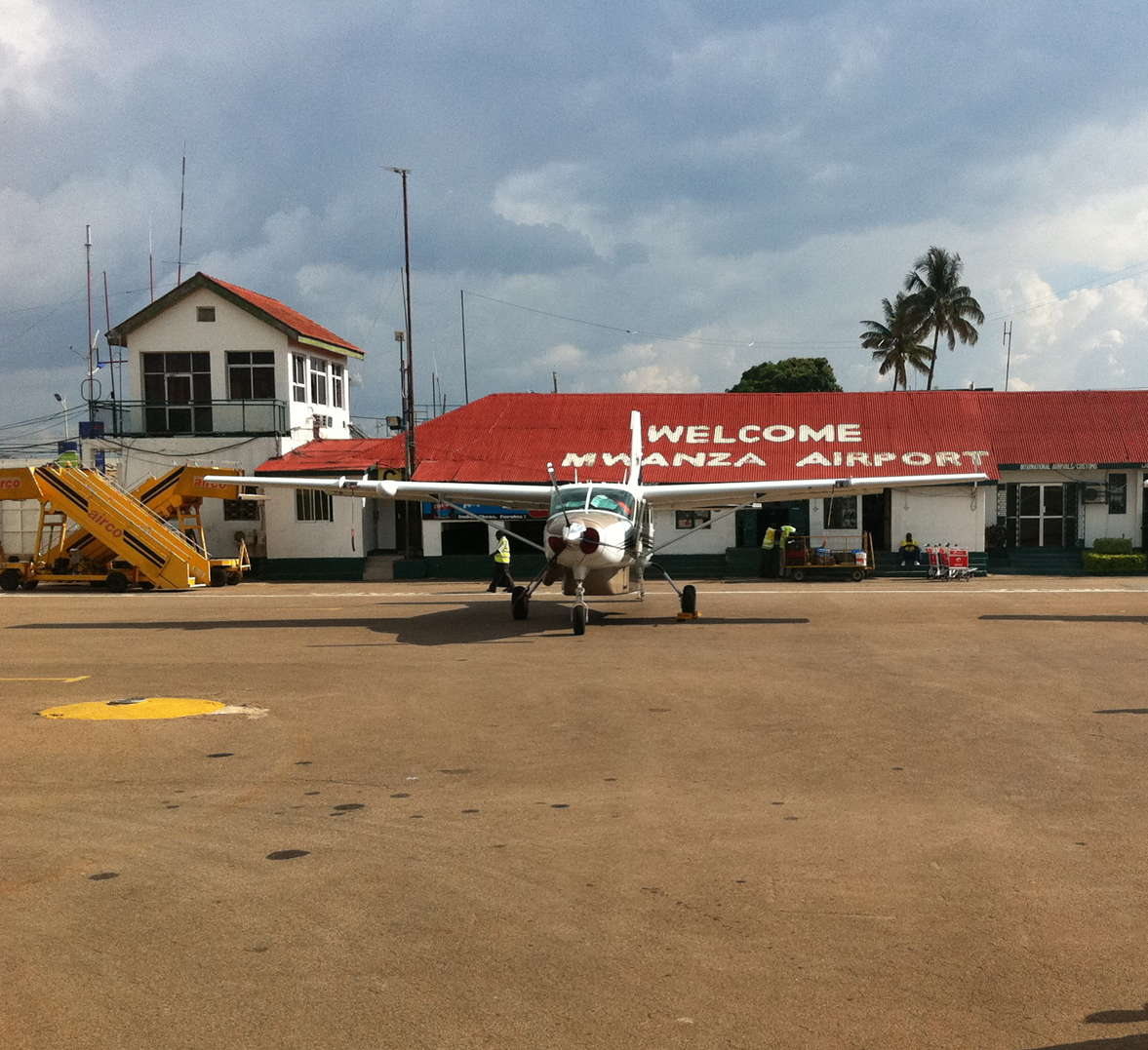
- IATA: MWZ; ICAO: HTMW; WMO: 63756

Summary
- Airport type: Public
- Owner: Government of Tanzania
- Operator: Tanzania Airports Authority
- Location: Ilemela District, Mwanza, Mwanza Region, Tanzania
- Hub for: Auric Air
- Focus city for: Precision Air
- Elevation AMSL: 3,763 ft / 1,147 m
- Coordinates: 2°26′40″S 32°56′00″E
- Website: www.taa.go.tz

Map
- Location of Mwanza Airport.

Runways
Direction	Length		Surface
Direction	m	ft	Surface
12/30	3,712	12,178	Asphalt

Statistics (2024)
- Passengers: 350,380
- Aircraft movements: 8,321
- Cargo (tonnes): 839
- Source: TAA

Mwanza Airport (IATA: MWZ, ICAO: HTMW) is a major regional airport in northern Tanzania serving the city of Mwanza. It is located near the southern shores of Lake Victoria approximately 10 kilometres (6.2 mi) from the city. It serves as the main hub for Auric Air and a secondary hub for Precision Air.

== Expansion ==
A passenger lounge is under construction and will have a capacity of 1 million passengers annually. It was envisaged to be operational by September 2014. Construction stalled after the Tanzanian government failed to make payments to the Chinese contractor, Beijing Construction Engineering Group and in December 2014 construction was due to be completed by October 2015 assuming that funds would be available.

== Airlines and destinations ==
=== Passenger ===
Airlines	Destinations
Air Tanzania	Bukoba, Dar es Salaam, Kilimanjaro
Auric Air	Bukoba, Kigali, Kigoma, Mpanda, Musoma, Rubondo
Coastal Aviation	Arusha, Dar es Salaam, Kigali, Manyara, Selous, Serengeti, Tarangire, Zanzibar
Precision Air	Bukoba, Dar es Salaam, Kilimanjaro, Nairobi–Jomo Kenyatta

=== Cargo ===
Airlines	Destinations
Astral Aviation	Nairobi-Jomo Kenyatta
Ethiopian Airlines	Addis Ababa
RwandAir	Brussels

== Air Force Base ==
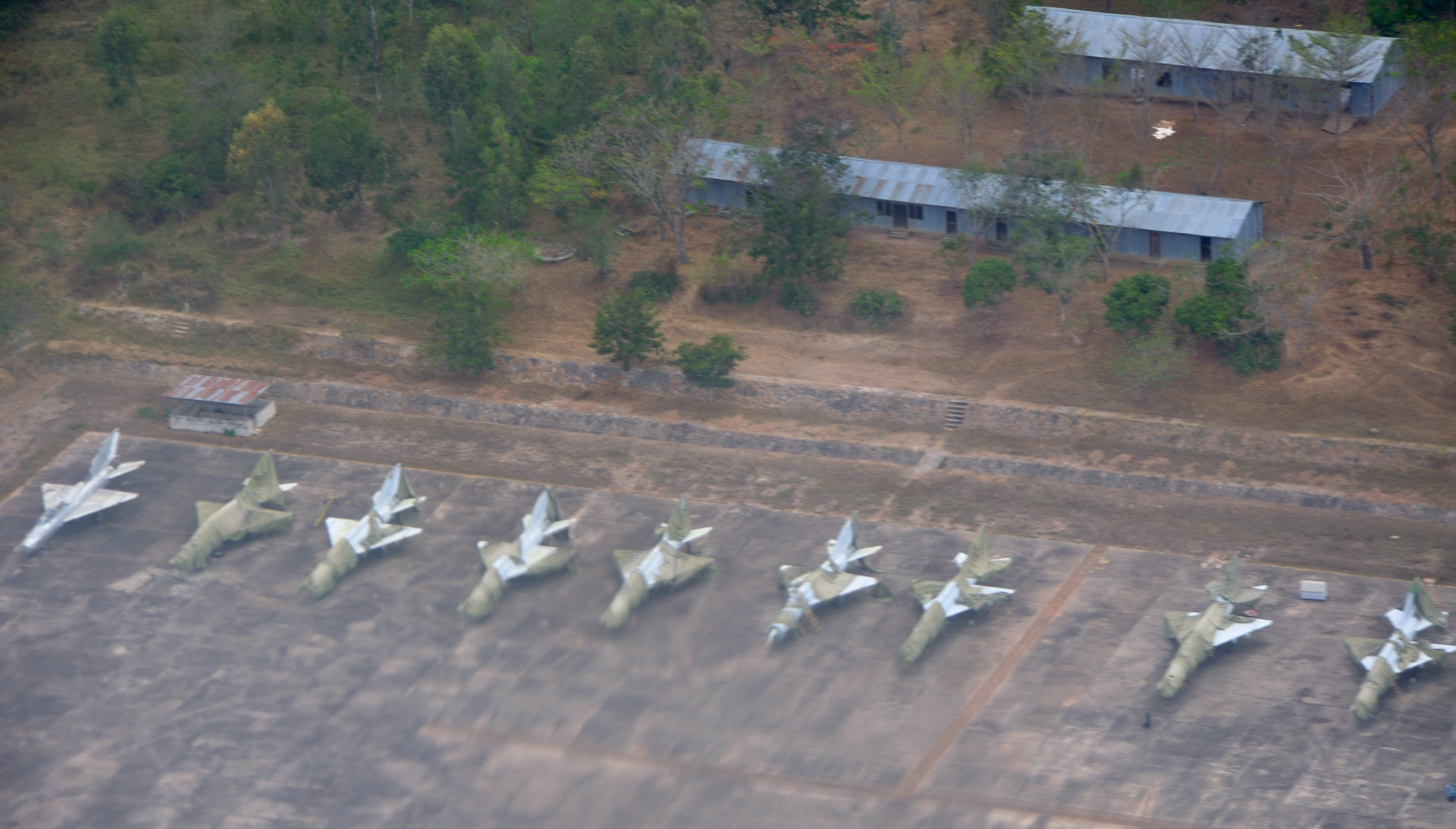
MiG-21 parked at Mwanza AFB

The Tanzanian Army's air force command operates an airbase at the south eastern side and has a direct access to runway 30.

== Accidents and incidents ==
- On 1 March 2010, the Air Tanzania Flight 100, operated by Boeing 737-200 5H-MVZ sustained substantial damage when it departed the runway on landing and the nosewheel collapsed. An engine also sustained damage.

== Gallery ==
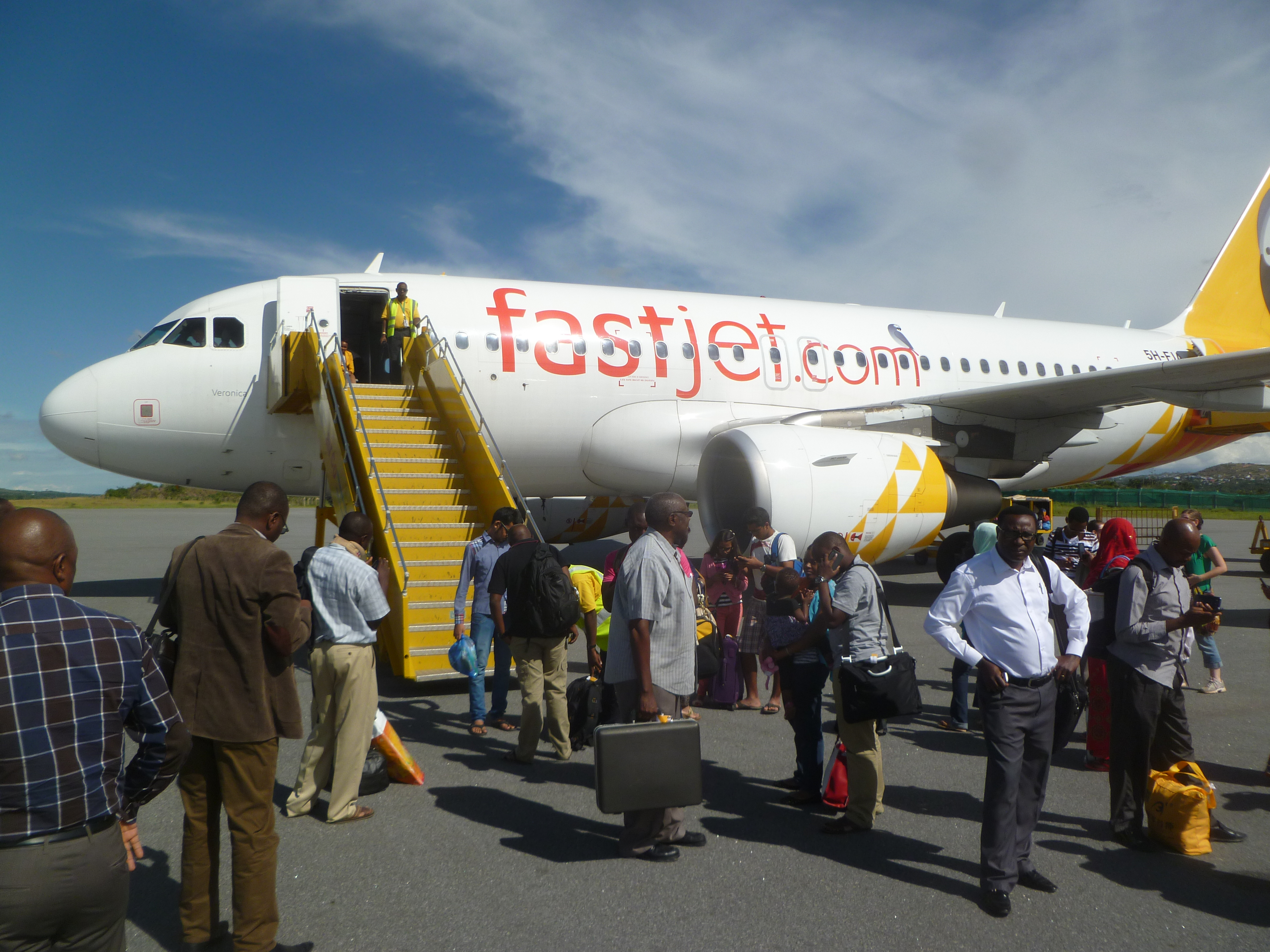
The FastJet airline's Airbus A319 disembarking passengers at the Mwanza Airport after arrival from Dar es Salaam.

== See also ==
- List of airports in Tanzania
- Transport in Tanzania
