= Parastatal Sector Reform Commission =

The Presidential Parastatal Sector Reform Commission is the organ of the Government of Tanzania under the Public Corporations Act, 1992 as amended in 1993 and 1999, to co-ordinate implementation of the government's economic reform efforts in the form of privatisation.
